= Taylor Airport =

Taylor Airport may refer to:

- Taylor Airport (Arizona) in Taylor, Arizona, United States (FAA: TYL)
- Taylor Airport (Quinlan, Texas) in Quinlan, Texas, United States (FAA: T14)
- Taylor Municipal Airport in Taylor, Texas, United States (FAA: T74)

== See also ==
- Taylor Field (disambiguation)
- Taylor County Airport (disambiguation)
