= Timeline of the first Trump presidency (2020 Q3) =

The following is a timeline of the first presidency of Donald Trump during the third quarter of 2020, from July 1 to September 30, 2020. For a complete itinerary of his travels, see List of presidential trips made by Donald Trump (2020–21). To navigate quarters, see timeline of the Donald Trump presidencies. For the Q4 timeline see timeline of the first Trump presidency (2020 Q4–January 2021).

== Timeline ==
=== Overview ===
President Trump campaigned for the ongoing presidential primaries, accepted the nomination at the Republican National Convention, faced the ongoing presidential election, participated in the first presidential debates, and tackled the ongoing global COVID-19 pandemic by extending the nationwide Centers for Disease Control and Prevention guidelines throughout the month of July.

=== July 2020 ===
Date	Events	Photos/videos
Wednesday, July 1	The United States–Mexico–Canada Agreement (USMCA) comes into effect, replacing the North American Free Trade Agreement (NAFTA). President Trump had campaigned on replacing NAFTA with a new trade agreement.; The number of deaths in the United States attributed to the SARS-CoV-2 disease is 127,461. There are more than 2.7 million certified COVID-19 cases.	
Thursday, July 2	President Trump launches "Made in America Week" at the White House by showcasing products made in all fifty states.	President Trump delivers remarks at the Made in America Product Showcase
Friday, July 3	President Trump hosts military personnel and their families for a picnic and fireworks show at Mount Rushmore as part of Independence Day celebrations.	President Trump speaks at the Mount Rushmore fireworks celebrations event
Saturday, July 4	President Trump's 2020 Salute to America occurs on Independence Day in Washington, D.C., in addition to other events.	President Trump speaks at the Salute to America event
Sunday, July 5		
Monday, July 6		
Tuesday, July 7	President Trump informs Congress and the United Nations that the United States will formally withdraw from the World Health Organization (WHO), effective July 6, 2021.	
Wednesday, July 8	President Trump holds a bilateral meeting and joint press conference with Mexican president Andrés Manuel López Obrador at the White House to discuss the new United States–Mexico–Canada Agreement.; The number of deaths in the United States attributed to the SARS-CoV-2 disease is 131,289. There are more than 3.0 million certified COVID-19 cases.	A Joint Press Conference with President Trump and Mexican President López Obrador
Thursday, July 9	The Supreme Court rules 7-2 that House Democrats may not access President Trump's tax returns, but also determined that he is not immune to a subpoena for his returns from a New York prosecutor.	
Friday, July 10	As Tropical Storm Fay approaches, President Trump cancels Saturday plans for a campaign rally in Portsmouth, New Hampshire.; President Trump commutes the sentence of Roger Stone, who was convicted of witness tampering and lying to Congress about President Trump's dealings with Russia to the Mueller probe.	Warrant for Roger Stone's commutation
Saturday, July 11		
Sunday, July 12		
Monday, July 13	President Trump conducts a White House panel composed of "people who have had positive interactions with the police".	
Tuesday, July 14	President Trump gathers reporters and press for a news conference in the Rose Garden at the White House.; The Trump administration orders hospitals to forego sending all COVID-19 patient information to the CDC and instead submit it to a central database maintained by the Department of Health and Human Services.; President Trump signs the Hong Kong Autonomy Act into law, placing sanctions on organizations that undermine Hong Kong's autonomy.; President Trump announces new measures against China during a 54-minute stream-of-consciousness press conference promising a vaccine for the COVID-19, blaming China for "unleashing [the COVID-19] upon the world" and various other topics from Joe Biden to crime in "Democrat cities".	President Trump signs the Hong Kong Autonomy Act
Wednesday, July 15	The number of deaths in the United States attributed to the SARS-CoV-2 disease is 136,356. There are more than 3.4 million certified COVID-19 cases.	
Thursday, July 16	The Trump administration announces that hospitals will begin to send COVID-19 patient information to a central database maintained by the Department of Health and Human Services rather than the CDC.	
Friday, July 17		
Saturday, July 18		
Sunday, July 19		
Monday, July 20		
Tuesday, July 21	President Trump signs a presidential memorandum requesting a ban of undocumented immigrants being counted in the 2020 census.; President Trump announces plans to deploy federal law enforcement officers to “Democrat” cities to quell ongoing protests over racism and police brutality. Chicago Mayor Lori Lightfoot expressed concern saying, "We don’t need federal agents without any insignia taking people off the streets and holding them, I think, unlawfully."	
Wednesday, July 22	Calling the protests in Portland, Oregon “worse than Afghanistan,” President Trump defended the use of excessive force against the peaceful protestors by officers in military camouflage fatigues.; The number of deaths in the United States attributed to the SARS-CoV-2 disease is 142,031. There are more than 3.9 million certified COVID-19 cases.	
Thursday, July 23		
Friday, July 24	President Trump signs four executive orders designed to lower prices on prescription drugs.	President Trump signs Executive Orders on lowering drug prices
Saturday, July 25		
Sunday, July 26		
Monday, July 27	National security advisor Robert O'Brien tests positive for COVID-19. He has since been working remotely.	
Tuesday, July 28	Without any evidence that mail-in ballots increase electoral fraud, President Trump continues to suggest that the November election should be delayed.	
Wednesday, July 29	The number of deaths in the United States attributed to the SARS-CoV-2 disease is 150,100. There are more than 4.3 million certified COVID-19 cases.	
Thursday, July 30	The U.S. GDP indicator declined 9.5% during the second quarter of 2020, the most drastic decline in 70 years.; President Trump suggests postponing the 2020 United States presidential election.	
Friday, July 31	President Trump says he plans to use presidential authority to terminate the Chinese social media platform TikTok from operating in the U.S.	

=== August 2020 ===
Date	Events	Photos/videos
Saturday, August 1		
Sunday, August 2		
Monday, August 3		
Tuesday, August 4	The House of Representatives Oversight Committee calls Postmaster General Louis DeJoy to testify about recent delays and staff changes at the U.S. Postal Service.	
Wednesday, August 5	President Trump meets with Governor of Arizona Doug Ducey in the Oval Office.; The number of deaths in the United States attributed to the SARS-CoV-2 disease is 157,297. There are more than 4.7 million certified COVID-19 cases.; Stephen Akard, the acting State Department's inspector general, resigns after less than three months. His deputy, Diana Shaw is appointed as the temporary acting inspector general effective on August 7.	President Trump and Arizona Governor Ducey
Thursday, August 6	President Trump signs executive orders banning the use of TikTok and WeChat in the United States within 45 days if their Chinese parent companies refuse to sell them as a result of national security concerns.; President Trump tours Whirlpool Corporation.	President Trump tours Whirlpool Corporation
Friday, August 7		
Saturday, August 8	President Trump signs an executive order and memoranda restoring COVID-19 relief pay for unemployed Americans at $400 per week.	President Trump signing orders re-establishing relief pay
Sunday, August 9		
Monday, August 10		
Tuesday, August 11		
Wednesday, August 12	The number of deaths in the United States attributed to the SARS-CoV-2 disease is 164,462. There are more than 5.1 million certified COVID-19 cases.	
Thursday, August 13	The Trump Administration brokers a peace agreement between United Arab Emirates and Israel, the first agreement between Israel and an Arab-Muslim nation.	
Friday, August 14	During a White House press conference, President Trump mentions the Kevin Clinesmith plea agreement, in which a former FBI lawyer admitted to altering an email for the C.I.A. used by the agency to continue a secret wiretap on the former Trump 2016 campaign adviser Carter Page. Trump claims Clinesmith was "corrupt" and the plea deal was "just the beginning".	
Saturday, August 15		
Sunday, August 16		
Monday, August 17	President Trump holds a campaign rally in Mankato, Minnesota.; President Trump holds a campaign rally in Oshkosh, Wisconsin.	
Tuesday, August 18	President Trump visits Yuma, Arizona, along the southern border and meets with Border Patrol personnel.; President Trump holds a campaign rally in Yuma, Arizona.	President Trump with a U.S. Customs and Border Protection officer
Wednesday, August 19	The number of deaths in the United States attributed to the SARS-CoV-2 disease is 172,958. There are more than 5.5 million certified COVID-19 cases.	
Thursday, August 20	President Trump holds a bilateral meeting with Iraqi prime minister Mustafa Al-Kadhimi at the White House.; President Trump holds a campaign rally in Old Forge, Pennsylvania.	President Trump and Iraqi Prime Minister Mustafa Al-Kadhimi
Friday, August 21		
Saturday, August 22		
Sunday, August 23		
Monday, August 24	The four-day Republican National Convention begins.; President Trump accepts the nomination of the Republican Party for the 2020 United States presidential election.	
Tuesday, August 25	President Trump and Postmaster General Louis DeJoy are sued by the states of New York and New Jersey over changes to postal service operations such as the removal of mailboxes and mail sorting machines, the curtailing of overtime hours and the implementation of additional service reductions.	
Wednesday, August 26	The number of deaths in the United States attributed to the SARS-CoV-2 disease is 179,215. There are more than 5.8 million certified COVID-19 cases.	
Thursday, August 27	President Trump delivers acceptance speech at the Republican National Convention at the South Lawn of the White House. Saying he “profoundly” accepted the nomination for a second term he spoke for 70-minutes on the South Lawn of the White House. He repeatedly misrepresented his record while leveling false or misleading attacks on Democrats, blaming them for America's problems.; The House Foreign Affairs Committee proceeds with contempt proceedings and a subpoena against Mike Pompeo related to the State Department's involvement in attempts to link Joe Biden to corruption in Ukraine.	
Friday, August 28	President Trump holds a campaign rally in Londonderry, New Hampshire.; Four people who attended the Republican National Convention (which had just ended) test positive for COVID-19.	
Saturday, August 29	President Trump visits areas affected by Hurricane Laura.	President Trump in Lake Charles, Louisiana
Sunday, August 30		
Monday, August 31	John Ratcliffe, the Director of National Intelligence, says his agency will no longer give Congress in-person briefings about election security, citing concern over "unauthorized disclosures of sensitive information" and will switch to written updates.	

=== September 2020 ===
Date	Events	Photos/videos
Tuesday, September 1	While discussing the shooting of Jacob Blake, President Trump compares police officers to golfers who might “choke” while attempting a putt.	
Wednesday, September 2	President Trump participates in the 75th anniversary of the end of World War II celebrations at the battleship North Carolina in Wilmington, North Carolina, and designates the city as the first "American World War II Heritage City", which the secretary of the interior is allowed to designate one city a year beginning in 2020.; The number of deaths in the United States attributed to the SARS-CoV-2 disease is 184,564. There are more than 6 million certified COVID-19 cases.; President Trump urges North Carolina voters to cast two votes in the upcoming presidential election, once by mail and then again in person, in order to test his unsubstantiated claims that mail-in voting is prone to fraud.	President Trump visits North Carolina to attend a ceremony commemorating the end of WWII
Thursday, September 3	President Trump holds a campaign rally in Latrobe, Pennsylvania.	
Friday, September 4	President Trump participates in the signing ceremony of the economic normalization agreements with Serbian president Aleksandar Vučić and Kosovan prime minister Avdullah Hoti at the White House.; A memo to government agencies from the Office of Management and Budget calls on all agencies to ceases funding for diversity training. labelling it "divisive and anti-American propaganda".; President Trump disputes reports in The Atlantic magazine that he has called dead American service members "losers" and those signing to serve in the armed service as "suckers".	President Trump participates in signing an economic normalization agreements between Serbia and Kosovo
Saturday, September 5		
Sunday, September 6		
Monday, September 7		
Tuesday, September 8	President Trump holds a campaign rally in Winston-Salem, North Carolina and promotes voting by mail and in person.; The Department of Justice takes over the defense of the President in a defamation lawsuit accusing him of sexual assault.	
Wednesday, September 9	The number of deaths in the United States attributed to the SARS-CoV-2 disease is 189,538. There are more than 6.3 million certified COVID-19 cases.; Christian Tybring-Gjedde, a Norwegian politician, nominates President Trump for the Nobel Peace Prize.	
Thursday, September 10	President Trump holds a news conference and debates with journalists about the disparity between what was said about the severity of the COVID-19 in interviews with Bob Woodward and his efforts to "play it down" to the American people.; President Trump holds a campaign rally in Freeland, Michigan.	
Friday, September 11	President Trump speaks at the Flight 93 National Memorial to commemorate the 19th anniversary of the September 11 attacks.; The Trump Administration brokers a peace agreement between Bahrain and Israel, the second agreement between Israel and an Arab-Muslim nation in less than one month.; President Trump presents the Medal of Honor to Sergeant Major Thomas Payne.; A member of the Swedish Parliament nominated President Trump and the governments of Kosovo and Serbia for the 2021 Nobel Peace Prize over economic cooperation and trade talks.	President Trump speaks at the Flight 93 National Memorial on the 19th anniversary of 9/11
Saturday, September 12	President Trump addresses a crowd of supporters at a campaign rally in Minden, Nevada.	
Sunday, September 13	President Trump holds a roundtable at the Treasure Island Hotel and Casino in Las Vegas, Nevada.; President Trump addresses a crowd of supporters at a campaign rally in Henderson, Nevada.	
Monday, September 14	President Trump participates in a briefing on the 2020 California wildfires with state officials in McClellan Park, California.; President Trump participates in a ceremony honoring soldiers of the California National Guard for their heroic actions during the 2020 California wildfires.; President Trump holds a roundtable in Phoenix, Arizona.	President Trump speaks at a ceremony for the California National Guard
Tuesday, September 15	President Trump participates in the signing ceremony of the Abraham Accords, normalizing relations between Israel, the United Arab Emirates and Bahrain.; President Trump participates in a town-hall meeting style event with undecided Pennsylvania voters moderated by ABC's George Stephanopoulos.	President Trump at the Abraham Accords signing ceremony
Wednesday, September 16	Michael Caputo, Assistant Secretary for Health and Human Services for Public Affairs, announces he will take a 60-day leave of absence after he accused government scientists of “sedition” and called on Trump's supporters to arm themselves ahead of the November 3rd election.; President Trump holds a press briefing in the James S. Brady Press Briefing Room, speaking on multiple topics including the COVID-19 and Hurricane Sally.; The number of deaths in the United States attributed to the SARS-CoV-2 disease is 196,410. There are more than 6.6 million certified COVID-19 cases.	President Trump speaks to reporters during a press briefing
Thursday, September 17	President Trump, alongside United States Secretary of the Interior David Bernhardt and United States Ambassador to Finland Robert Pence among others, announces that the Finnish government has agreed to return Native American artifacts and remains to the United States. The artifacts and remains were taken in 1891 by explorer Gustaf Nordenskiöld. All remains and funerary objects were reinterned in Mesa Verde National Park.; President Trump presents a speech at the National Archives Building. He speaks on multiple topics including American history and recent civil unrest.; President Trump addresses a crowd of supporters at a campaign rally in Mosinee, Wisconsin.; President Trump announces the formation of The 1776 Commission a "patriotic education" commission.	President Trump speaks at the National Archive Building in Washington D.C.
Friday, September 18	President Trump presents the Legion of Merit to Emir Sabah Al-Ahmad Al-Jaber Al-Sabah of Kuwait in a private ceremony at the White House.; The United States Department of Commerce announces that apps TikTok and WeChat will be un-downloadable on all platforms in the United States effective September 20, 2020. Users who have already downloaded TikTok will still be able to use the app until November 13, 2020.; President Trump approves an additional $13 billion in funding to Puerto Rico to continue rebuilding efforts for Hurricane Maria damages.; The Centers for Disease Control and Prevention reverses a controversial guidance stating that asymptomatic people should not receive a COVID-19 test.; President Trump holds a press conference in the James S. Brady Press Briefing Room, speaking on multiple topics including a COVID-19 vaccine and relief to Puerto Rico.; Associate Justice of the Supreme Court of the United States Ruth Bader Ginsburg passes away at age 87 due to pancreatic cancer.; President Trump addresses a crowd of supporters at a campaign rally in Bemidji, Minnesota.	President Trump speaks to reporters during a press briefing
Saturday, September 19	An envelope addressed to the White House is intercepted and found to be laced with the deadly toxin ricin. Authorities say the envelope originated in Canada.; President Trump announces his support of the proposed deal for Walmart and Oracle Corporation to take over TikTok's cloud computing and acquire a combined 20% stake in the company. In response the United States Department of Commerce delays the banning of the app until September 27, 2020.; President Trump addresses a crowd of supporters at a campaign rally in Fayetteville, North Carolina. During the rally he announces that he is planning on filling the vacant Supreme Court of the United States seat left by the death of Ruth Bader Ginsburg, pledging that he will nominate another woman.	President Trump speaks to reporters upon departure from the White House
Sunday, September 20	Laurel Beeler, U.S. Magistrate Judge of the United States District Court for the Northern District of California, files a preliminary injunction effectively barring the United States Department of Commerce's plans to ban the Chinese owned app WeChat from the American market.; President Trump approves a disaster declaration for the State of Alabama due to the effects of Hurricane Sally.	Hurricane Sally position as of September 18, 2020. President Trump declared a disaster in the State of Alabama due to this hurricane.
Monday, September 21	President Trump administration officials announce multiple new sanctions against the Iranian Defense Ministry and Venezuelan President Nicolás Maduro.; Senior Judge of the United States District Court for the District of Nevada James C. Mahan dismisses a lawsuit filed by President Trump against the State of Nevada challenging the state's recent mail-in voting law.; President Trump addresses a crowd of supporters at two campaign rallies: One in Dayton, Ohio and the other in Swanton, Ohio.	A joint press conference on the most recent sanctions imposed against Iran and Venezuela
Tuesday, September 22	President Trump speaks virtually at the General debate of the seventy-fifth session of the United Nations General Assembly.; The number of people who have died as a result of the COVID-19 pandemic in the United States reaches 200,000 with 6.9 million cases total.; Senator Mitt Romney announces his support to push through a Supreme Court nominee, effectively giving President Trump the majority he needs in the United States Senate to confirm a nominee.; President Trump addresses a crowd of supporters at a campaign rally in Pittsburgh, Pennsylvania.	President Trump Addresses the 75th Session of the United Nations General Assembly
Wednesday, September 23	President Trump honors veterans of the Bay of Pigs Invasion in a ceremony in the East Room of the White House. He also takes the opportunity to announce further sanctions against Cuba.; A New York state judge orders Eric Trump to appear at an under oath disposition on October 7, 2020 in regard to financial crime investigations against the Trump Organization.; President Trump meets with multiple state Attorneys General in the Cabinet Room of the White House, speaking on the "dangers of protecting Americans from censorship, cancel culture, and consumer abuses inflicted by big tech companies."; President Trump holds a news conference in the James S. Brady Press Briefing Room. In response to a question about if he would commit to a peaceful transfer of power he says, “Well, we’ll have to see what happens. You know that. I’ve been complaining very strongly about the ballots. And the ballots are a disaster,”.	President Trump delivers remarks honoring Bay of Pigs veterans
Thursday, September 24	President Trump and First Lady Melania Trump pay respects to the late Justice Ruth Bader Ginsburg, who is lying in repose in the Great Hall of the United States Supreme Court Building. While paying their respects booing was heard from the crowd, as well as chants of "honor her wish".; President Trump speaks in Charlotte, North Carolina where he unveils his plan for the future of health care.; President Trump addresses a crowd of supporters at a campaign rally in Jacksonville, Florida.	President Trump and First Lady Melania Trump pay their respects to Associate Justice Ruth Bader Ginsburg as she lies in repose at the U.S. Supreme Court
Friday, September 25	President Trump holds a roundtable in Doral, Florida.; President Trump speaks at a forum, declaring that if re-elected he would fund more money into institutions that lend to African-American businesses. He called this "The Platinum Plan".; Lucy Koh, United States District Judge of the Northern District of California, rules that the Trump Administration is not allowed to end the 2020 United States Census early, and orders the United States Census Bureau to continue through October 31.; President Trump addresses a crowd of supporters at a campaign rally in Newport News, Virginia.	President Trump speaks to reporters upon his return to Joint Base Andrews
Saturday, September 26	President Trump is diagnosed with COVID-19, but keeps this a secret from the public (knowledge of this diagnosis becomes public in November 2021).; President Trump nominates Amy Coney Barrett as an Associate Justice of the Supreme Court to fill the vacancy left by Ruth Bader Ginsburg, who died on September 18.; President Trump addresses a crowd of supporters at a campaign rally in Middletown, Pennsylvania.; President Trump hosts a potential superspreading event at the White House Rose Garden leading to the White House COVID-19 outbreak.	President Trump nominates Amy Coney Barrett for the Supreme Court Justice
Sunday, September 27		
Monday, September 28	President Trump delivers an update on the COVID-19 COVID-19 testing strategy.; President Trump receives his third Nobel Peace Prize nomination from a group of Australian law professors.	President Trump delivers remarks on COVID-19 testing strategy
Tuesday, September 29	President Trump and former Vice President Joe Biden participate in the first presidential debate at Case Western Reserve University in Cleveland, Ohio. The debate was moderated by Chris Wallace of Fox News.	
Wednesday, September 30	President Trump addresses a crowd of supporters at a campaign rally in Duluth, Minnesota.; The Trump administration announces plans to slash refugee admissions to the U.S. for 2021 to a record low 15,000 refugees, from a cap of 18,000 for 2020.; Ronna McDaniel, the chair of the Republican National Committee, tests positive for COVID-19.	

== See also ==
- First 100 days of the first Trump presidency – Period from January to April 2017
- List of executive actions by Donald Trump
- Lists of presidential trips made by Donald Trump (international trips)
- First presidential transition of Donald Trump – Transfer of presidential power from Barack Obama to Donald Trump
- Timeline of the 2016 United States presidential election

U.S. presidential administration timelines
Preceded by First Trump presidency (2020 Q2)	First Trump presidency (2020 Q3)	Succeeded by First Trump presidency (2020 Q4–January 2021)
