= Timeline of the first Trump presidency (2020 Q2) =

The following is a timeline of the first presidency of Donald Trump during the second quarter of 2020, from April 1 to June 30, 2020. For a complete itinerary of his travels, see List of presidential trips made by Donald Trump (2020–21). To navigate between quarters, see timeline of the Donald Trump presidencies. For the Q3 timeline see timeline of the first Trump presidency (2020 Q3).

== Timeline ==
=== Overview ===
President Trump campaigned for the ongoing presidential primaries and tackled the ongoing global COVID-19 pandemic by extending the nationwide Centers for Disease Control and Prevention guidelines throughout the month of April.

=== April 2020 ===
Date	Events	Photos/videos
Wednesday, April 1	President Trump reveals that his decision to extend the social distancing guidelines to April 30 was motivated by models which predicted that if the restrictions were removed as many as 2.2 million people would die and about half the country would be infected. President Trump also warned that between 100,000 and 240,000 Americans could become infected in the coming days, despite strict isolation and distancing guidelines.; More than 3,600 people have died in the United States from the SARS-CoV-2 disease. 1,941 have died in New York state, 267 in New Jersey, 259 in Michigan, 239 in Louisiana, 225 in Washington state, 184 in California and 139 in Georgia. Every other state except Wyoming has recorded at least one death attributed to the virus.	
Thursday, April 2	Acting Secretary of the Navy Thomas Modly announces he has relieved Captain Brett Crozier from the USS Theodore Roosevelt (CVN-71) for going outside the chain of command for help with 114 positive COVID-19 cases on board the aircraft carrier.; In the daily COVID-19 press conference, Jared Kushner declares that the "notion of the federal stockpile was it's supposed to be our stockpile; it's not supposed to be state stockpiles that they then use."	President Trump and members of the coronavirus task force hold a news conference (April 2, 2020)
Friday, April 3	President Trump notifies Congress he has "removed from office" Intelligence Community Inspector General Michael Atkinson, the individual who had informed Congress about the whistleblower complaint that led to the Ukraine probe and the president's impeachment.	President Trump and members of the coronavirus task force hold a news conference (April 3, 2020)
Saturday, April 4		President Trump and members of the coronavirus task force hold a news conference (April 4, 2020)
Sunday, April 5		President Trump and members of the coronavirus task force hold a news conference (April 5, 2020)
Monday, April 6	President Trump nominates Brian D. Miller to fill the newly created position of Special Inspector General for Pandemic Recovery.	President Trump and members of the coronavirus task force hold a news conference (April 6, 2020)
Tuesday, April 7	President Trump announces that Kayleigh McEnany will become the 31st White House press secretary, replacing Stephanie Grisham, who was moved to be the First Lady's chief of staff.; President Trump dismisses Glenn A. Fine as acting inspector general for the Defense Department, making him ineligible to chair the recently created Pandemic Response Accountability Committee that he had been appointed to eight days previously.; Acting Navy Secretary Thomas Modly submits a letter of resignation to Defense Secretary Mark Esper.	
Wednesday, April 8	The number of deaths in the United States attributed to the COVID-19 disease is 12,956. There are more than 397,000 certified COVID-19 cases.	
Thursday, April 9		
Friday, April 10		
Saturday, April 11		
Sunday, April 12		
Monday, April 13		
Tuesday, April 14		
Wednesday, April 15	The number of deaths in the United States attributed to the COVID-19 disease is 25,922. There are more than 606,800 certified COVID-19 cases.; President Trump announces that the US will stop funding the World Health Organization (WHO), after Trump criticized the WHO for being too lenient on China.; President Trump threatens to prorogue both houses of Congress in order to make recess appointments.	
Thursday, April 16	President Trump announces that the states can begin lifting restrictions for COVID-19 by May 1 while acknowledging that the decision to reopen is best left to the states.	
Friday, April 17	President Trump tweets "LIBERATE", interpreted as support of not extending lock-downs in Michigan, Minnesota, and Virginia.	
Saturday, April 18		
Sunday, April 19		
Monday, April 20	President Trump announces on Twitter that he will temporarily suspend all immigration in an effort to protect America from "the Invisible Enemy".	
Tuesday, April 21		
Wednesday, April 22	The number of deaths in the United States attributed to the COVID-19 disease is 42,200. There are more than 830,000 certified COVID-19 cases.; Health Dept. official Dr. Rick Bright is fired by President Trump after questioning the effectiveness of Hydroxychloroquine as a drug to treat COVID-19 and requesting extensive tests to confirm Trump's claims.	
Thursday, April 23	After the Senate passes a $480 billion aid bill to help small businesses and hospitals as well as to increase the number of COVID-19 tests performed the House of Representatives approves the bill in a vote of 388–5, sending the bill to President Trump for signing.	Press briefing, Trump suggests that disinfectants such as bleach could be used on the COVID-19, by injection or other means of exposure (at 1:14:14).
Friday, April 24	President Trump signs the Paycheck Protection Program and Health Care Enhancement Act to provide hospitals with $484 billion in funding to increase COVID-19 testing.; At the daily COVID-19 press briefing, President Trump promotes the use of ultraviolet light as a remedy to COVID-19, and muses about injecting bleach or disinfectant into the lungs or other areas of the body to kill the virus.	President Trump signs the Paycheck Protection Program Act
Saturday, April 25		
Sunday, April 26		
Monday, April 27		
Tuesday, April 28	President Trump meets with Governor of Florida Ron DeSantis in the Oval Office.	President Trump and Florida Governor DeSantis
Wednesday, April 29	President Trump meets with Governor of Louisiana John Bel Edwards in the Oval Office.; The number of deaths in the United States attributed to the COVID-19 disease is 53,034. There are more than 1 million certified COVID-19 cases.	President Trump and Louisiana Governor Edwards
Thursday, April 30	President Trump meets with Governor of New Jersey Phil Murphy in the Oval Office.	President Trump and New Jersey Governor Murphy

=== May 2020 ===
Date	Events	Photos/videos
Friday, May 1	President Trump dismisses Acting Health and Human Services inspector general Christi Grimm, who had issued an April report describing severe shortages of COVID-19 testing materials and personal protective equipment.	
Saturday, May 2		
Sunday, May 3	During a Fox News town hall in the Lincoln Memorial, President Trump revises his forecast for the death toll from COVID-19, increasing it to 100,000. He also admits the disease has been more lethal than he expected, adding that early intelligence briefings indicated the virus was "not a big deal".	
Monday, May 4		
Tuesday, May 5	President Trump tours Honeywell Aerospace.	President Trump tours Honeywell Aerospace
Wednesday, May 6	President Trump meets with Governor of Iowa Kim Reynolds in the Oval Office.; The number of deaths in the United States attributed to the COVID-19 disease is 71,077. There are more than 1.2 million certified COVID-19 cases.	
Thursday, May 7	One of Trump's personal valets tests positive for COVID-19. White House staffers, including valets, generally do not wear masks. Trump claims, however, that he requires all his aides to take rapid tests for the virus before he travels anywhere with them.; President Trump meets with Governor of Texas Greg Abbott in the Oval Office.; President Trump speaks at the National Day of Prayer service in the Rose Garden.; The Justice Department announces that it is dropping all charges against President Trump's former National Security Advisor, Michael Flynn.	President Trump and Texas Governor Abbott
Friday, May 8	President Trump and First Lady Melania Trump participate in the 75th anniversary of VE Day celebrations.; Katie Miller, the top spokesperson for Vice President Mike Pence, tests positive for COVID-19. She is married to Stephen Miller, a top aide and speechwriter for President Trump. This suggests multiple people who work in the West Wing may have been exposed.	President Trump and First Lady Melania Trump attend the VE Day ceremony
Saturday, May 9		
Sunday, May 10	Despite the COVID-19 diagnosis for one of his staff members, Vice President Pence said he would not self-isolate and would continue to work in person at the White House. Other members of the coronavirus Task Force, including Drs. Redfield, Hahn, and Fauci, however, planned to self-isolate.	
Monday, May 11	During a press conference, CBS News White House correspondent Weijia Jiang asks President Trump, "Why is this a global competition to you if every day Americans are still losing their lives?" referring to the number of COVID-19 tests performed daily. Trump responds by saying, "They're losing their lives everywhere in the world. And maybe that's a question you should ask China. Don't ask me, ask China that question, OK?".	President Trump and members of the coronavirus task force hold a news conference (May 11, 2020)
Tuesday, May 12		
Wednesday, May 13	President Trump meets with Governor of Colorado Jared Polis and Governor of North Dakota Doug Burgum.; The number of deaths in the United States attributed to the COVID-19 disease is 82,350. There are more than 1.37 million certified COVID-19 cases.	President Trump with Colorado Governor Polis and North Dakota Governor Burgum
Thursday, May 14	President Trump tours Owens & Minor.	President Trump delivers remarks at the Owens & Minor
Friday, May 15	President Trump delivers remarks on Operation Warp Speed.	President Trump announces Operation Warp Speed
Saturday, May 16	President Trump fires Inspector General of the Department of State Steve Linick, following reports that Linick was investigating Secretary of State Mike Pompeo over reports of abuse of office.	
Sunday, May 17		
Monday, May 18	President Trump reveals that he is taking Hydroxychloroquine, an anti-malarial drug untested for its effectiveness against COVID-19, despite FDA warnings that it may cause serious heart problems.	
Tuesday, May 19		
Wednesday, May 20	President Trump meets with Governor of Arkansas Asa Hutchinson and Governor of Kansas Laura Kelly at the White House.; The number of deaths in the United States attributed to the COVID-19 disease is 91,937. There are more than 1.54 million certified COVID-19 cases.	President Trump with Arkansas Governor Hutchinson and Kansas Governor Kelly
Thursday, May 21	President Trump tours Ford Rawsonville Components Plant.	President Trump delivers remarks at the Ford Rawsonville Components Plant
Friday, May 22		
Saturday, May 23		
Sunday, May 24		
Monday, May 25	President Trump performs a wreath-laying ceremony at the Tomb of the Unknown Soldier at the Arlington National Cemetery commemorating Memorial Day and gives a speech honoring those who have died fighting for the U.S.	President Trump lays the wreath at the Tomb of the Unknown Soldier
Tuesday, May 26	Glenn Fine, the Defense Department Principal Deputy Inspector General, submitted his resignation, effective June 1. Fine provided leadership of the COVID-19 accountability review of emergency funds.	
Wednesday, May 27	President Trump threatens to close or impose regulation on social media after Twitter flags his post on mail-in ballots as inaccurate.; The number of deaths in the United States attributed to the COVID-19 disease is 98,937. There are more than 1.6 million certified COVID-19 cases.; President Trump and First Lady Melania Trump attend the attempted launch of the SpaceX Dragon 2 spacecraft from the Kennedy Space Center. However, the launch was postponed to May 30 due to the weather.	President Trump at the SPACE-X demonstration before the attempted launch
Thursday, May 28	President Trump signs an executive order limiting the legal protection that social media companies have, allowing federal agencies and regulators to hold them liable if found to be violating free speech protections by deleting posts or user accounts.	
Friday, May 29	President Trump warns on Twitter that the "THUGS" using the protests of the murder of George Floyd, to loot and destroy businesses in Minneapolis would be shot if looting continued, adding that "when the looting starts, the shooting starts."	
Saturday, May 30	President Trump attends the second attempted launch of the SpaceX Dragon 2 spacecraft from the Kennedy Space Center, which the launch was finally success.	President Trump at the Kennedy Space Center
Sunday, May 31	In an early morning tweet President Trump declares the United States of America will be designating ANTIFA as a terrorist organization.; News reports surface claiming that on Friday night Secret Service agents rushed President Trump to a White House bunker as hundreds of protesters gathered outside the executive mansion, some of them throwing rocks and tugging at police barricades.	

=== June 2020 ===
Date	Events	Photos/videos
Monday, June 1	In a conference call with the nation's governors, President Trump declares that Chairman of the Joint Chiefs of Staff Mark A. Milley, the nation's highest-ranking military officer, was "in charge" of the response to protests. The nature of Milley's position was not specified, nor the legal authority under which he would assume such a position.; President Trump delivers a speech in the Rose Garden declaring that he was "dispatching thousands and thousands of heavily armed soldiers, military personnel and law enforcement officers to stop the rioting, looting, vandalism, assaults and the wanton destruction of property," and, "If a city or state refuses to take the actions that are necessary ... then I'll deploy the United States military and quickly solve the problem for them."; After the press conference at the Rose Garden, Trump walks to the nearby St. John's Church in Lafayette Square, where an adjacent building had experienced a fire the previous night, for a photo op. In preparation for Trump's arrival, riot police and military police use tear gas and stun grenades to clear peaceful protesters assembled at the park. and the clergy at the church.; The White House provided clarification for President Trump's May 31, 2020, announcement on Twitter that he vows to designate ANTIFA as a terrorist group.	President Trump at St. John's Episcopal Church
Tuesday, June 2	President Trump and First Lady Melania Trump visit the Saint John Paul II National Shrine.	President and First Lady Trump at the Saint John Paul II National Shrine
Wednesday, June 3	President Trump announces that the Republican National Committee would move the 2020 Republican National Convention from Charlotte, NC to another location, after North Carolina Governor Roy Cooper did not find the health and safety measures put forth by the Republican National Committee to be adequate.; The number of deaths in the United States attributed to the COVID-19 disease is 106,184. There are more than 1.8 million certified COVID-19 cases.	
Thursday, June 4		
Friday, June 5		
Saturday, June 6		
Sunday, June 7		
Monday, June 8		
Tuesday, June 9	President Trump asserts on Twitter that Martin Gugino, elderly man pushed to the ground by police in Buffalo, New York, during a protest over the murder of George Floyd could be a "set up" that Gugino was an "ANTIFA provocateur".	
Wednesday, June 10	The number of deaths in the United States attributed to the COVID-19 disease is 112,174. There are more than 1.9 million certified COVID-19 cases.	
Thursday, June 11	The Republican National Committee selects Jacksonville, Florida to host its convention on August 27.	
Friday, June 12		
Saturday, June 13	President Trump speaks to the cadets at the United States Military Academy at West Point graduation ceremony.; President Trump announced that the rally in Tulsa, Oklahoma would be held on June 20, out of respect.	
Sunday, June 14		
Monday, June 15	The Supreme Court rules in a 6–3 decision that LGBT rights are protected against discrimination by the Civil Rights Act of 1964.	
Tuesday, June 16	The Trump administration announces that it is ordering former National Security Advisor John Bolton to cease publication of his new book, claiming that it violates non-disclosure agreements and releases classified information.; Elaine McCusker, CFO of the Defense Department, resigns.	
Wednesday, June 17	Solicitor General Noel Francisco, who defended Trump administration policies before the Supreme Court, announces he is leaving the Department of Justice.; The number of deaths in the United States attributed to the COVID-19 disease is 116,979. There are more than 2.1 million certified COVID-19 cases.	
Thursday, June 18	The Supreme Court rules in a 5–4 decision that President Trump may not immediately end Deferred Action for Childhood Arrivals (DACA), saying that the Administration did not provide "a reasoned explanation for its action".; Mary Elizabeth Taylor, the first black woman to serve as assistant Secretary of State for Legislative Affairs, resigns, stating President Trump's "comments and actions surrounding racial injustice...cut sharply against my core values and conviction".; Kathryn Wheelbarger, a leading Defense Department policy official in the Pentagon, resigns.	
Friday, June 19	Geoffrey Berman, the top US attorney in the SDNY, declines to leave his post after Attorney General William Barr announces his removal and replacement earlier in the evening.	
Saturday, June 20	President Trump removes Geoffrey Berman as head attorney for the SDNY after he refuses to step down the previous evening.; President Trump holds a rally in Tulsa, Oklahoma. Two Secret Service agents at the event test positive for coronavirus; the Secret Service later asks all agents who worked at the event to self-quarantine at home for 14 days.	
Sunday, June 21		
Monday, June 22	Kevin Hassett, chair of the Council of Economic Advisers and the White House's chief economist, announces he will leave this summer after helping deal with the economic disruptions of the continuing coronavirus pandemic.	
Tuesday, June 23	President Trump travels to Yuma, Arizona, near the U.S.–Mexico border to examine progress on the US–Mexico border wall and meets with Border Patrol personnel.; President Trump holds a rally with Students for Trump at the Dream City Megachurch in Phoenix, Arizona	President Trump with a U.S. Customs and Border Protection officer
Wednesday, June 24	The number of deaths in the United States attributed to the SARS-CoV-2 disease is 121,978. There are more than 2.3 million certified coronavirus cases.; President Trump holds a bilateral meeting and joint press conference with Polish president Andrzej Duda at the White House.; Aaron Zelinsky, a prosecutor on Robert Mueller's team, and John Elias, a career official in the Antitrust Division at DOJ, appear before a House Judiciary Committee hearing to give testimony about sentencing recommendations for Roger Stone.	President Trump and Polish President Duda
Thursday, June 25	President Trump and First Lady Melania Trump participate in the 70th anniversary of the start of the Korean War.; The Justice Act, a Republican-sponsored police overhaul bill, falls short of the 60 votes of support required to advance the bill after Senate Democrats block the bill and call it "woefully inadequate".; In the House of Representatives, the George Floyd Justice in Policing Act is approved by a vote of 236 to 181.; The Trump administration files a brief asking the Supreme Court to invalidate the Affordable Care Act.	President Trump and First Lady Melania Trump attend the Korean War wreath laying ceremony
Friday, June 26	The New York Times breaks a story about bounties being paid by Russia to Taliban militants to kill American and coalition forces currently stationed in Afghanistan.	
Saturday, June 27		
Sunday, June 28		
Monday, June 29	Director of National Intelligence John Ratcliffe, White House chief of staff Mark Meadows, and national security adviser Robert C. O'Brien conduct a briefing for GOP lawmakers at the White House concerning intelligence suggesting Russia financed Taliban militants to target US and coalition troops.	
Tuesday, June 30		

== See also ==
- First 100 days of the first Trump presidency – Period from January to April 2017
- List of executive actions by Donald Trump
- Lists of presidential trips made by Donald Trump (international trips)
- First presidential transition of Donald Trump – Transfer of presidential power from Barack Obama to Donald Trump
- Timeline of the 2016 United States presidential election

U.S. presidential administration timelines
Preceded by First Trump presidency (2020 Q1)	First Trump presidency (2020 Q2)	Succeeded by First Trump presidency (2020 Q3)
