= KOCF =

KOCF may refer to:

- Ocala International Airport (ICAO code KOCF)
- KOCF-LP, a low-power radio station (92.7 FM) licensed to serve Veneta, Oregon, United States
