= Timeline of the first Trump presidency (2020 Q4–January 2021) =

The following is a timeline of the first presidency of Donald Trump during the fourth and last quarter of 2020 from October 1 to December 31, 2020 and the first 20 days of 2021 from January 1 to 20, 2021, when Trump left office and was succeeded by Joe Biden. For a complete itinerary of his travels, see List of presidential trips made by Donald Trump (2020–21). To navigate quarters, see timeline of the Donald Trump presidencies.

== Timeline ==
=== Overview ===
President Trump tested positive for COVID-19 and treated at Bethesda Naval Hospital, campaigned for the ongoing presidential election, participated in the final presidential debate, lost the presidential election to Joe Biden but refused to concede, attempted to overturn the election results, urged his supporters to march to the Capitol resulting in multiple deaths during the attack and interrupting the electoral vote count, suspended from social media, faced his second impeachment for incitement of insurrection but later acquitted, tackling the ongoing COVID-19 pandemic by extending the nationwide Centers for Disease Control and Prevention guidelines throughout the month of October.

=== October 2020 ===
Date	Events	Photos/videos
Thursday, October 1	Hope Hicks, senior counselor to President Trump, tests positive for COVID-19. She traveled with President Trump to the debate in Cleveland on September 29 and to a rally in Minnesota on September 30. Although some White House officials were aware of her diagnosis in the morning, "Trump still took a trip to New Jersey for a fundraiser, and press secretary Kayleigh McEnany still held a news briefing at the White House."	
Friday, October 2	President Trump tweets that both he and First Lady Melania Trump had tested positive for COVID-19 and would immediately quarantine. Later that day, President Trump boarded a helicopter to Bethesda Naval Hospital for treatment.; President Trump's campaign manager Bill Stepien, RNC chairwoman Ronna Romney McDaniel, and Senior Senator Mike Lee of Utah test positive for COVID-19.	President Trump departs the White House for COVID-19 treatment
Saturday, October 3	Nick Luna, one of President Trump's closest personal attendants in the White House, tests positive for COVID-19.; Senators Thom Tillis, Mike Lee and Ron Johnson all test positive for COVID-19. As a result, Senate Majority Leader Mitch McConnell halts all Senate floor action for two weeks.	President Trump works in the Presidential Suite at Walter Reed National Military Medical Center. Dr. Sean Conley provides an update on President Trump's health status
Sunday, October 4	After President Trump rides in a motorcade around Walter Reed Medical Center, a physician at the hospital says that every Secret Service agent inside the vehicle will have to quarantine for 14 days.	President Trump in a motorcade near Walter Reed Medical Center
Monday, October 5	White House press secretary Kayleigh McEnany announces she has COVID-19 and will quarantine. Two of her deputies also test positive.; President Trump is discharged from the hospital and returns to the White House in the evening.	Dr. Sean Conley provides an update on President Trump's health status President Trump gives "thumbs up" greeting from the White House balcony
Tuesday, October 6	Stephen Miller, senior political advisor to the president, tests positive for COVID-19.	
Wednesday, October 7	Vice President Mike Pence and Senator Kamala Harris participate in the only vice presidential debate at University of Utah in Salt Lake City, Utah. The debate was moderated by Susan Page of USA Today.	
Thursday, October 8	President Trump, having suddenly announced two days ago that he was ending negotiations with lawmakers regarding a new economic stimulus package, now says the talks are back on.	
Friday, October 9	The Commission on Presidential Debates cancels the October 15 scheduled debate between President Trump and Joe Biden. President Trump had refused to participate virtually. The third and final debate remains scheduled for October 22.	
Saturday, October 10	President Trump holds a rally on the South Lawn of the White House. Attendees' travel and lodging was paid for by Candace Owens' group BLEXIT, which encourages Black Americans to leave the Democratic Party.	President Trump delivers remarks at a Peaceful Protest for Law and Order
Sunday, October 11		
Monday, October 12	President Trump addresses a crowd of supporters at a campaign rally in Sanford, Florida.	
Tuesday, October 13	President Trump addresses a crowd of supporters at a campaign rally in Johnstown, Pennsylvania.	
Wednesday, October 14	President Trump addresses a crowd of supporters at a campaign rally in Des Moines, Iowa.	
Thursday, October 15	President Trump addresses a crowd of supporters at a campaign rally in Greenville, North Carolina.; President Trump participates in a town-hall meeting style event with undecided Florida voters instead of a planned second presidential debate, which was cancelled after Trump refused to participate in a virtual event.	
Friday, October 16	The Federal Emergency Management Agency (FEMA) rejects California's request for federal aid for the ongoing forest fires. A FEMA spokesperson remarked that the damage was "...not of such severity and magnitude to exceed the combined capabilities of the state, affected local governments, voluntary agencies and other responding federal agencies."; President Trump addresses a crowd of supporters at two campaign rallies: Ocala, Florida, and Macon, Georgia.	
Saturday, October 17	President Trump approves a federal disaster declaration for California's wildfires after having rejected the request the previous day.; President Trump addresses a crowd of supporters at two campaign rallies: Muskegon, Michigan, and Janesville, Wisconsin.	
Sunday, October 18	President Trump addresses a crowd of supporters at a campaign rally in Carson City, Nevada.	
Monday, October 19	President Trump addresses a crowd of supporters at two campaign rallies in Arizona: Prescott and Tucson.	
Tuesday, October 20	President Trump addresses a crowd of supporters at a campaign rally in Erie, Pennsylvania.	
Wednesday, October 21	President Trump addresses a crowd of supporters at a campaign rally in Gastonia, North Carolina.	
Thursday, October 22	President Trump and Democratic Party nominee former Vice President Joe Biden participate in the final presidential debate at Belmont University in Nashville, Tennessee. The debate was moderated by Kristen Welker of NBC.	
Friday, October 23	The Trump Administration brokers a peace agreement between Sudan and Israel, the third agreement between Israel and an Arab-Muslim nation in less than three months.; President Trump addresses a crowd of supporters at two campaign rallies in Florida: The Villages and Pensacola.	Supporters at the Trump campaign stop in The Villages, Florida
Saturday, October 24	President Trump addresses a crowd of supporters at three campaign rallies: Lumberton, North Carolina; Circleville, Ohio; and Waukesha, Wisconsin.	
Sunday, October 25	CBS aired President Trump and Vice President Pence's interview for its news show 60 Minutes which was filmed earlier in the week. President Trump was perturbed at host Lesley Stahl asking "hard questions" and complained that former Vice President Biden had received "softball questions". Trump then walked off the set.; President Trump addresses a crowd of supporters at a campaign rally in Manchester, New Hampshire.; President Trump and First Lady Melania Trump participate in the White House Halloween event.	President Trump and First Lady Melania Trump greet trick-or-treaters during the White House Halloween event
Monday, October 26	President Trump addresses a crowd of supporters at three campaign rallies in Pennsylvania: Allentown; Lititz; and Martinsburg.; The Senate confirms Amy Coney Barrett as an Associate Justice of the Supreme Court in a vote of 52–48.; President Trump attends the swearing in of Amy Coney Barrett as an Associate Justice of the Supreme Court by Justice Clarence Thomas on the South Lawn of the White House.	Supreme Court Justice Amy Coney Barrett is sworn in, in the South Lawn of the White House
Tuesday, October 27	Amy Coney Barrett takes the final judicial oath with Chief Justice John Roberts at the Supreme Court of the United States thereby officially starting her tenure as Associate Justice of the Supreme Court.; President Trump addresses a crowd of supporters at three campaign rallies: Lansing, Michigan; West Salem, Wisconsin; and Omaha, Nebraska.	President Trump holds a campaign rally in Goodyear, Arizona
Wednesday, October 28	President Trump addresses a crowd of supporters at two campaign rallies in Arizona: Bullhead City and Goodyear.	President Trump holds a campaign rally in Omaha, Nebraska
Thursday, October 29	President Trump addresses a crowd of supporters at a campaign rally in Tampa, Florida.	
Friday, October 30	President Trump addresses a crowd of supporters at three campaign rallies: Waterford Township, Michigan; Green Bay, Wisconsin; and Rochester, Minnesota.	
Saturday, October 31	President Trump addresses a crowd of supporters at four campaign rallies in Pennsylvania: Newtown; Reading; Butler; and Montoursville.	

=== November 2020 ===
Date	Events	Photos/videos
Sunday, November 1	President Trump addresses a crowd of supporters at five campaign rallies: Washington Township, Michigan; Dubuque, Iowa; Hickory, North Carolina; Rome, Georgia; and Opa-locka, Florida.	
Monday, November 2	President Trump addresses a crowd of supporters at five campaign rallies: Fayetteville, North Carolina; Scranton, Pennsylvania; Traverse City, Michigan; Kenosha, Wisconsin; and Grand Rapids, Michigan.	
Tuesday, November 3	The 2020 United States presidential election takes place. A projected winner of the election is not declared on election night.; The Democratic Party retains their majority in the House of Representatives while the Republican Party is projected to retain their majority in the Senate.	
Wednesday, November 4	The interim results show President Trump carries 23 states and leads 213 electoral votes compared to Democratic Party nominee former Vice President Joe Biden, who carries 19 states and leads 227 electoral votes.; A projected winner of the election is still yet to be declared with eight remaining states are still being counted. These states are Alaska, Arizona, Georgia, Michigan, Nevada, North Carolina, Pennsylvania and Wisconsin, and Maine's 2nd congressional district.; Despite the lack of a clear projected winner, President Trump prematurely declares victory at approximately 2:00 a.m., falsely claiming concerns about voter fraud and mail-in ballots. President Trump states his intention to request the Supreme Court to prevent any more ballots from being counted and continues on to claim, "Frankly, we already won this election."; In the evening, Biden is projected to win Michigan (16 electoral votes) and Wisconsin (10 electoral votes), putting the projected total to 253 electoral votes compared to President Trump at 214 electoral votes. However, a projected winner of the election is still yet to be declared.	
Thursday, November 5	The interim results show President Trump carries 23 states and leads 214 electoral votes compared to Biden, who carries 21 states and leads 253 electoral votes.; A projected winner of the election is still yet to be declared with six remaining states are still being counted. These states are Alaska, Arizona, Georgia, Nevada, North Carolina and Pennsylvania.; President Trump holds a press conference in the White House. His opening statement is, "If you count the legal votes I easily win. If you count the illegal votes, they can try to steal the election from us." He continued, displaying misinterpretation of the Constitution, the role of the Supreme Court and the rule of law regarding the counting of votes. He did not take questions.	President Trump alleges mass voter fraud in the 2020 presidential election
Friday, November 6	Biden overtakes President Trump's leads in Georgia and Pennsylvania, further jeopardizing the president's re-election chances. A projected winner of the election is still yet to be declared.; President Trump joins Biden as the second presidential candidate to reach 70 million votes in a United States presidential election and reaches second place in highest number of votes in any election, with Biden taking first place, having earned more than 80 million votes.	
Saturday, November 7	Democratic Party nominee former Vice President Joe Biden becomes president-elect after he had secured the projected total to 273 electoral votes by winning Pennsylvania (20 electoral votes), which he had reached over the required electoral votes of 270 to clinch victory. However, President Trump refuses to concede defeat and continues to challenge the results.; In the evening, Biden is projected to win Nevada (6 electoral votes), putting the projected total to 279 electoral votes.	
Sunday, November 8	The interim results show President Trump carries 23 states and leads 214 electoral votes compared to President-elect Biden, who carries 23 states and leads 279 electoral votes.; A projected winner of the election is still yet to be declared with four remaining states are still being counted. These states are Alaska, Arizona, Georgia and North Carolina.	
Monday, November 9	President Trump announces on Twitter that Secretary of Defense Mark Esper is fired. Director of the National Counterterrorism Christopher C. Miller becomes Acting Secretary of Defense.	
Tuesday, November 10	Secretary of State Mike Pompeo refuses to acknowledge President-elect Biden's victory in the recent 2020 presidential election, falsely claiming that "there will be a smooth transition to a second Trump administration."	
Wednesday, November 11	In his first public appearance in six days, President Trump performs a wreath-laying ceremony at the Tomb of the Unknown Soldier at the Arlington National Cemetery commemorating Veterans Day. He did not speak at the event.; President Trump is projected to win Alaska (3 electoral votes), putting the projected total to 217 electoral votes compared to President-elect Biden's 279 electoral votes.; Arizona, Georgia and North Carolina are still yet to be declared.; After Mark Milley, the Chairman of the Joint Chiefs of Staff, was presented with an unusual memo signed by Trump ordering the removal of all troops from Somalia and Afghanistan, Milley then drove to the White House for an unusual, no notice appearance. The memo was then determined not to be fraudulent, but was revoked until after Trump could meet with his national security team.	President Trump lays the wreath at the Tomb of the Unknown Soldier
Thursday, November 12	The Cybersecurity and Infrastructure Security Agency, part of the Department of Homeland Security, reports that the 2020 presidential election was "the most secure in American history". The election officials also said they found "no evidence that any voting system deleted or lost votes, changed votes or was in any way compromised".	
Friday, November 13	President Trump delivers an update on Operation Warp Speed.; President Trump is projected to win North Carolina (15 electoral votes), putting the projected total to 232 electoral votes.; President-elect Biden is projected to win Arizona (11 electoral votes) and Georgia (16 electoral votes), putting the projected total to 306 electoral votes.; The interim results show President Trump carries 25 states and 232 electoral votes compared to President-elect Biden, who carries 25 states and leads 306 electoral votes. All states have now been declared within 10 days after the election.	President Trump delivers remarks on Operation Warp Speed
Saturday, November 14		
Sunday, November 15		
Monday, November 16		
Tuesday, November 17	President Trump announces on Twitter that he is firing Director of the Cybersecurity and Infrastructure Security Agency (CISA) Chris Krebs for contradicting him on the prevalence of fraud in the recent presidential election.	
Wednesday, November 18	Matthew Travis, deputy director of CISA, resigns.	
Thursday, November 19	After the Georgia recount is completed, President-elect Biden is certified as the winner in Georgia.	
Friday, November 20	President Trump briefly participates in the virtual APEC summit, hosted by Malaysia, his first appearance at the APEC summit since 2017.; President Trump meets with two Republican legislative leaders from Michigan at the White House to discuss the possibility that the Michigan board of canvassers could choose not to certify the election results. The state legislatures would then appoint different electors who would possibly overturn the will of the voters. However, the lawmakers reaffirmed that they would honor the results of the election in Michigan and stated that there is no reason to overturn the results.	
Saturday, November 21	President Trump briefly participates in the virtual G20 summit, hosted by Saudi Arabia, his last appearance at the G20 summit meeting with world leaders before handing powers to president-elect Joe Biden on January 20, 2021.	
Sunday, November 22	President Trump again briefly participates in the virtual G20 summit, hosted by Saudi Arabia and delivers a virtual address. Trump criticized the Paris Agreement and stated that it crippled the United States economy.	President Trump participates in the virtual G20 summit
Monday, November 23	First Lady Melania Trump welcomes the arrival of the White House Christmas tree at the White House for the fourth and final time in President Trump's first term.; The General Services Administration (GSA) informs President-elect Biden that the Trump administration would be allowed to begin the formal transition. President Trump praised GSA Administrator Emily W. Murphy for the move on Twitter.	First Lady Melania Trump receives the 2020 White House Christmas tree
Tuesday, November 24	President Trump and First Lady Melania Trump participate in the National Thanksgiving Turkey Presentation for the fourth and final time in his first term.	President Trump and First Lady Melania Trump pardon a turkey named "Corn"
Wednesday, November 25	President Trump pardons former National Security Advisor Michael Flynn, who pleaded guilty to making false statements during the Mueller investigation in 2017.	
Thursday, November 26	President Trump speaks with armed services personnel in a Thanksgiving video teleconference call.; President Trump admits that he would leave office if the electoral college votes for Joe Biden, adding it would be a mistake "and a very hard thing to concede".	President Trump participates in a Thanksgiving video teleconference call
Friday, November 27		
Saturday, November 28		
Sunday, November 29		
Monday, November 30	First Lady Melania Trump unveils the Christmas decorations at the White House for the fourth and final time of this term.; Scott Atlas, an advisor to President Trump and member of the White House Coronavirus Task Force, resigns.	First Lady Melania Trump unveils the 2020 Christmas decorations

=== December 2020 ===
Date	Events	Photos/videos
Tuesday, December 1	President Trump threatens to veto the National Defense Authorization Act unless lawmakers agree to repeal a legal shield for social media companies.	
Wednesday, December 2	Vice President Mike Pence swears in Democrat Mark Kelly as United States Senator from Arizona.; President Trump uploads a 46-minute speech on his claims of alleged voter fraud to his social media platforms titled "This may be the most important speech I've ever made...".	Vice President Pence swears in Mark Kelly
Thursday, December 3	President Trump presents the Presidential Medal of Freedom to former football coach Lou Holtz.	President Trump awards the Presidential Medal of Freedom to Lou Holtz
Friday, December 4	President Trump signs the Rodchenkov Anti-Doping Act of 2019, a law that would criminalize doping schemes.	
Saturday, December 5	President Trump holds a rally for Republicans David Perdue and Kelly Loeffler in Valdosta, Georgia, and spends most of the 100 minute speech on his conspiratorial theories of electoral fraud rather than on the runoff elections against Democrats Raphael Warnock and Jon Ossoff, respectively.	
Sunday, December 6	President Trump's personal attorney Rudy Giuliani is admitted to hospital after testing positive for COVID-19.	
Monday, December 7	President Trump presents the Presidential Medal of Freedom to Olympic wrestler Dan Gable.	President Trump awards the Presidential Medal of Freedom to Dan Gable
Tuesday, December 8	President Trump hosts an Operation Warp Speed vaccine summit.; President Trump says that he would invoke the Defense Production Act of 1950 if needed for vaccine doses.	President Trump at the Operation Warp Speed Vaccine Summit
Wednesday, December 9	Texas Attorney General Ken Paxton files an amicus brief with the Supreme Court asking to block four states — Pennsylvania, Michigan, Wisconsin, and Georgia — from casting electoral votes for President-elect Joe Biden.; President Trump hosts the annual White House Hanukkah Party and in a speech to guests claims he will be re-elected, despite losing the election, if the Supreme Court "[has] courage".	
Thursday, December 10	The Trump Administration brokers a normalization agreement between Morocco and Israel, the fourth agreement between Israel and an Arab nation since August. The White House said the U.S. would recognize Morocco's claim over Western Sahara as part of the deal.; The third (no portrait was taken for 2019) and final official White House Christmas portrait of the Trump administration is taken on the Grand Staircase by White House photographer Andrea Hanks. It is not released publicly until December 18, 2020.	
Friday, December 11	President Trump acknowledges that there may be a Biden administration that can be prevented. He called for the Supreme Court to follow the Constitution and "do what has to be done" in order to avoid a Biden admin.; President Trump signs a one-week spending bill to avoid a government shutdown.; The Supreme Court declines to hear the Paxton lawsuit (seeking to overturn the 2020 presidential election) stating that the State of Texas did not have legal standing to bring the case before the Court.	
Saturday, December 12	President Trump takes part in the coin toss for his third and final Army–Navy Game as commander-in-chief before handing power to Biden.	President Trump participates in the Army–Navy Game, his last as commander-in-chief before handing power to Biden.
Sunday, December 13		
Monday, December 14	All 538 electors for the electoral college met to cast their votes and finalize the 2020 presidential election results. Both candidates received their projected counts of 306 for President-elect Biden and 232 for President Trump without any faithless electors.; President Trump announces on Twitter that William Barr will resign as Attorney General, effective December 23.	
Tuesday, December 15	Senate majority leader Mitch McConnell congratulates Joe Biden and Kamala Harris on their victory, accepting the results of the 2020 election in another blow to President Trump's attempt to delegitimise the election results, saying, "Many of us had hoped the presidential election would yield a different result" and that "all Americans can take pride that our nation has a female vice president-elect for the very first time".	
Wednesday, December 16		
Thursday, December 17	President Trump signs a bill authorizing an outdoor federal monument in Washington, D.C., to the women's suffrage movement to honor the activists who won women the right to vote such as Susan B. Anthony, Elizabeth Cady Stanton, and Sojourner Truth.	President Trump signs H.R. 473
Friday, December 18	Vice President Mike Pence, Second Lady Karen Pence and Surgeon General Jerome Adams all receive the Pfizer/BioNTech COVID-19 vaccine in a televised White House event with Vice President Pence becoming the most senior figure in the U.S. so far to receive the vaccine.; The Trump administration announces they will close the remaining two U.S. consulates in Russia following a suspected cyberattack on government agencies.; First Lady Melania Trump releases the third (no portrait was taken for 2019) and final official White House Christmas portrait of the Trump administration taken by White House photographer Andrea Hanks on December 10, 2020.	
Saturday, December 19		
Sunday, December 20		
Monday, December 21	The United States National Security Council announces that President Trump has awarded the Legion of Merit to former Japanese Prime Minister Shinzo Abe, Indian Prime Minister Narendra Modi, and Australian Prime Minister Scott Morrison.	
Tuesday, December 22	President Trump announces that he may not sign the $900B COVID-19 relief bill, which was passed by both the House and Senate. He also calls for Congress to amend the bill and increase the stimulus amount from $600 to $2,000.; President Trump grants 20 high-profile pardons. Among them are 4 Blackwater guards convicted of 17 murders in 2007, 2 Border Patrol agents in prison for murder and several corrupt former politicians.	
Wednesday, December 23	William Barr resigns as 85th United States Attorney General.; President Trump vetoes the National Defense Authorization Act for Fiscal Year 2021.; President Trump signs the Fallen Journalists Memorial Act, a law that honors the memory of slain journalists, including the victims of the Capital Gazette shooting.; President Trump departs the White House for Mar-a-Lago to celebrate Christmas.	
Thursday, December 24	Jeff Rosen becomes Acting Attorney General.	
Friday, December 25	President Trump celebrates the fourth Christmas of his administration at Mar-a-Lago.	
Saturday, December 26		
Sunday, December 27	Despite previously calling the $900 billion COVID-19 relief package "a disgrace", President Trump signs the Consolidated Appropriations Act of 2021, averting a government shutdown.	President Trump signs the Consolidated Appropriations Act of 2021
Monday, December 28	The House of Representatives votes 322–87 to override President Trump's veto of the National Defense Authorization Act for Fiscal Year 2021.	
Tuesday, December 29		
Wednesday, December 30		
Thursday, December 31	Republican Senator Josh Hawley of Missouri announces his plans to object to the election result certification on January 6.; President Trump returns to Washington, D.C., cutting short his Christmas and New Year celebrations at Mar-a-Lago.	

=== January 2021 ===
Date	Events	Photos/videos
Friday, January 1	Donald Trump begins his final month as President.; The United States Senate votes 81–13 to override President Trump's veto of the National Defense Authorization Act for Fiscal Year 2021, marking the first successful veto override of the Trump presidency.	
Saturday, January 2		
Sunday, January 3	The 117th United States Congress convenes with the Democratic Party is retaining their majority in the House of Representatives while the Republican Party is briefly retaining their majority in the Senate until January 20.; Nancy Pelosi is re-elected as Speaker of the United States House of Representatives.; A phone call between President Trump and Georgia Secretary of State, Brad Raffensperger is leaked showing Trump telling him the election was a fraud and demanding he find "11,780 votes, which is one more than we have." Raffensperger responds that the election results were correct and that Trump's data is wrong. Trump continued to claim voter fraud and said Raffensperger would be a "criminal" if he did not change the election results.	House Speaker Nancy Pelosi
Monday, January 4	President Trump presents the Presidential Medal of Freedom to Devin Nunes.; President Trump holds a rally for Republicans David Perdue and Kelly Loeffler in Dalton, Georgia, ahead of the upcoming runoffs to determine who controls the Senate. President-elect Joe Biden and Vice President Mike Pence also hold rallies.	President Trump awards the Presidential Medal of Freedom to Devin Nunes
Tuesday, January 5	U.S. District Judge Mark Howard Cohen denies an emergency injunction from President Trump to decertify the 2020 presidential election results in Georgia calling the lawsuit "beyond unprecedented".; Democrat Raphael Warnock is declared the winner of the 2020–21 Senate special runoff election in Georgia, defeating incumbent Republican Kelly Loeffler meaning a Republican majority in the Senate would be determined by the final runoff election between Republican David Perdue and Democrat Jon Ossoff which was too close to call on this day.	
Wednesday, January 6	President Trump holds a rally in Washington, D.C., to decry the certification of President-elect Joe Biden as the winner of the 2020 presidential election. He also calls on Vice President Pence to reject the electoral votes, even though the Vice President does not hold such legal power.; In a joint session of the United States Congress, the results for the electoral college are counted. During the certification of the electoral votes, the U.S. Capitol building is evacuated after rioters broke the security barrier and stormed the building. Both Houses of Congress recess the Electoral College debate after the mob forced a lockdown of the building. Vice President Mike Pence was evacuated.; Democrat Jon Ossoff is declared the winner of the 2021 Senate runoff election in Georgia, defeating Republican David Perdue. This gives the Senate a 50/50 split between the Republican and Democratic parties with Vice President-elect Kamala Harris holding the tie-breaking vote.	Trump supporters rally at the Save America March President Trump makes a statement during the Capitol attack
Thursday, January 7	In his role as President of the Senate, Vice President Mike Pence reads the results and declares President-elect Joe Biden as the winner of the 2020 presidential election after certification of the electoral votes resumed in a joint session of Congress.; As a result of the January 6 Capitol Hill breach, President Trump was suspended from Facebook and Instagram until after Biden's inauguration for allegedly inciting the riot. He was also suspended from Twitter for 24 hours, with the suspension only being lifted if he deleted three Tweets that Twitter say violated their terms of service because they used the platform "for the purpose of manipulating or interfering in elections or other civic processes".; White House Deputy Chief of Staff Chris Liddell orders all Trump administration staff to resign by January 20 as a step to clear the way for Biden to fill the government with his own staff.; House Speaker Nancy Pelosi calls for President Trump to be removed from office invoking the 25th Amendment over his involvement in the Capitol attack or they would begin impeachment proceedings against President Trump should this not happen.; For the first time, President Trump condemns the attack on the United States Capitol and formally acknowledges the upcoming Biden administration. He also says that his focus is to ensure a smooth transition of power to the "next administration", without mentioning President-elect Joe Biden by name.	President Trump condemns the attack and acknowledges the Biden administration
Friday, January 8	President Trump announces on Twitter that he will not attend President-elect Joe Biden's inauguration, making him the first outgoing President not to attend his elected successor's inauguration since the 1869 inauguration of Ulysses S. Grant.; President-elect Joe Biden calls President Trump's decision not to attend his inauguration "One of the few things he and I have ever agreed on. It's a good thing, him not showing up."; President Trump's personal Twitter account @realDonaldTrump is permanently suspended with Twitter citing "risk of further incitement of violence" following the Capitol attack which Twitter alleges Trump incited.	
Saturday, January 9		
Sunday, January 10	Vice President Mike Pence announces that he will attend Biden's inauguration.; President Trump orders all federal flags to be flown at half-staff in honor of Brian Sicknick, a police officer who was killed during the Capitol attack four days earlier.	
Monday, January 11	House Speaker Nancy Pelosi gives Vice President Mike Pence an ultimatum: Invoke the 25th Amendment within 24 hours to remove President Trump from office or they would begin impeachment proceedings against President Trump.; The Professional Golfer's Association announced the PGA Championship would no longer be taking place at President Trump's Golf course in New Jersey as they say it would be "detrimental to the brand".; President Trump awards the Presidential Medal of Freedom to Jim Jordan.; Democrats in the House of Representatives formally charge President Trump with one count of "incitement of insurrection" after Republicans in the House block invocation of the 25th Amendment making Trump the first President to face two Impeachment trials.; President Trump and Vice President Pence speak for the first time since the Capitol attack.; President Trump approves an emergency declaration from DC Mayor Muriel Bowser ahead of Biden's inauguration.; Vice President Pence responds to House Speaker Nancy Pelosi that he wouldn't invoke the Twenty-fifth Amendment.	
Tuesday, January 12	President Trump travels to Alamo, Texas, near the U.S.–Mexico border to examine progress on the US–Mexico border wall and meets with Border Patrol personnel.; Alex Azar announces that HHS would make changes to their vaccine distributions in an effort to speed up the rollout by encouraging states to open vaccination sites to all persons older than 65, however at the time the announcement was made, stockpiles were already exhausted.; During his speech at Alamo, President Trump asserted the Twenty-fifth Amendment is of "zero risk" to him and claimed it will "come back to haunt the Biden administration" adding "be careful what you wish for".	Alex Azar holds briefing about release of more COVID-19 vaccines, despite exhausted stockpiles. President Trump with a U.S. Customs and Border Protection officer
Wednesday, January 13	President Trump releases a statement calling for "no violence" in wakes of reports of planned armed demonstrations ahead of Biden's inauguration.; President Trump is impeached by the House of Representatives on charge of "incitement of insurrection" in a vote of 232–197.; President Trump becomes the first president in U.S. history to be impeached twice. President Trump would not face his second impeachment trial in the Senate until after his term has expired.	Second impeachment of President Trump President Trump condemns violence at the Capitol building and Big Tech censorship
Thursday, January 14	Vice President Pence makes an unscheduled stop at the United States Capitol to meet with United States National Guard troops ahead of Biden's inauguration.	
Friday, January 15	Vice President Pence congratulates his incoming successor, Vice President-elect Kamala Harris, 73 days after the 2020 presidential election.; President Trump awards the Legion of Merit to Morocco's King Mohammed VI during a private ceremony. The award is accepted on his behalf by Princess Lalla Joumala Alaoui, the Moroccan ambassador to the United States. In addition, Trump also receives the Order of Muhammad award for his work in advancing a normalization deal between Israel and Morocco.	
Saturday, January 16		
Sunday, January 17	Secretary of State Mike Pompeo accuses Iran of actively supporting Al Qaeda, saying the country now serves as a "home base" for the terrorist group and provides operatives with travel documents and logistical support.	
Monday, January 18	First Lady Melania Trump delivers a farewell address, urging Americans to Be Best.; President Trump signs an executive order that lifts travel restrictions on Brazil, the United Kingdom, China, and Europe after January 26. However, Jen Psaki, Biden's Press Secretary, says that the restrictions are expected to remain in place.	First Lady Melania Trump gives a farewell address from the White House
Tuesday, January 19	President Trump delivers his farewell address from the White House. Trump talks about the accomplishments during his first term as president and wishes good luck to the "upcoming administration", without mentioning President-elect Joe Biden by name.; Secretary of State Mike Pompeo declares that China has committed genocide against Uyghur Muslims and other ethnic minority groups.; Acting Deputy Secretary of Homeland Security Ken Cuccinelli signs an agreement with the union representing ICE agents that essentially hands control of immigration policy to the union.	President Trump gives a farewell address from the White House (transcript)
Wednesday, January 20	President Trump grants pardons to 73 individuals and commutes sentences for 70 others prior to finishing his full term.; China imposes sanctions on Secretary of State Mike Pompeo and 27 other officials of the Trump administration in response to Pompeo accusing China of committing genocide against Uyghurs.; President Trump leaves the White House for the final time in his first term. A farewell ceremony is held at Joint Base Andrews after which he and his wife depart aboard Air Force One.; President Trump does not attend the inauguration and returns to Mar-a-Lago to begin his inter-presidency. Vice President Pence returns to Indiana to begin his post-vice presidency after attending the inauguration.; Joe Biden is inaugurated as the 46th president of the United States, at noon EST.	President Trump delivers remarks prior to departing the White House before the end of his first term as president President Trump addresses a gathering of family and supporters at Joint Base Andrews

== See also ==
- First 100 days of the first Trump presidency – Period from January to April 2017
- List of executive actions by Donald Trump
- Lists of presidential trips made by Donald Trump (international trips)
- First presidential transition of Donald Trump – Transfer of presidential power from Barack Obama to Donald Trump
- Timeline of the 2016 United States presidential election

U.S. presidential administration timelines
Preceded by First Trump presidency (2020 Q3)	First Trump presidency (2020 Q4 – January 2021)	Succeeded by Biden presidency (2021 Q1)
