= Timeline of the first Trump presidency (2020 Q1) =

The following is a timeline of the first presidency of Donald Trump during the first quarter of 2020, from January 1 to March 31, 2020. For a complete itinerary of his travels, see List of presidential trips made by Donald Trump (2020–21). To navigate between quarters, see timeline of the Donald Trump presidencies. For the Q2 timeline see timeline of the first Trump presidency (2020 Q2).

== Timeline ==
=== Overview ===
President Trump begins the fourth year of his presidency at his Mar-a-Lago estate in Florida. Major General Qasem Solemani is assassinated, severely escalating tensions between Iran and the U.S., culminating in an attack by Iran on American military bases in Iraq and the crash of Ukrainian airlines flight 752. President Trump faced an impeachment trial in the Senate, for which he was ultimately acquitted, delivered his third state of the union address, the ongoing presidential primaries, the global COVID-19 pandemic, and the riots protesting the murder of George Floyd.

=== January 2020 ===
Date	Events	Photos/videos
Wednesday, January 1		
Thursday, January 2	Major General Qasem Soleimani, Iran's top security and intelligence commander, is killed in an airstrike at Baghdad International Airport. The Department of Defense issues a statement that the strike had been carried out "at the direction of the President".	
Friday, January 3	President Trump announces the death of Iranian major general Qasem Soleimani at Mar-a-Lago in Palm Beach, Florida in his address to the nation stating "at my direction, the United States military successfully executed a flawless precision strike that killed the number-one terrorist anywhere in the world, Qasem Soleimani. Soleimani was plotting imminent and sinister attacks on American diplomats and military personnel, but we caught him in the act and terminated him".	President Trump announces the death of Iranian commander Qassim Soleimani
Saturday, January 4	President Trump threatens on Twitter to attack Iranian cultural sites if Iran retaliates for the assassination of General Soleimani.	
Sunday, January 5	President Trump returns to Washington, D.C., after spending the holidays at his Mar-a-Lago estate in Palm Beach, Florida.	
Monday, January 6	The Senate returns from winter break.; President Trump holds a bilateral meeting with Saudi Arabian vice minister of defense Prince Khalid bin Salman.; Former national security adviser John Bolton announces that he is willing to testify in the Senate trial of President Trump if subpoenaed.	
Tuesday, January 7	The House returns from winter break.; President Trump holds a bilateral meeting with Greek prime minister Kyriakos Mitsotakis at the White House.; The Pentagon verifies an attack on U.S. forces: "At approximately 5:30 p.m. (EST) on January 7, Iran launched more than a dozen ballistic missiles against U.S. military and coalition forces in Iraq."	President Trump and Greek prime minister Kyriakos Mitsotakis
Wednesday, January 8	President Trump discusses diplomatic tensions with Iran in a televised address, warning Tehran of retaliation should they strike again, adding that "Iran appears to be standing down."; Ukrainian Airlines Flight 752 crashes on departure from Tehran International Airport, killing all 176 passengers aboard.; President Trump wishes North Korean leader Kim Jong-Un happy birthday, calling him a "very good friend".	President Trump discusses escalation of tensions with Iran
Thursday, January 9	Trump Administration officials, led by the secretary of state Pompeo, C.I.A. director Haspel and Defense Secretary Esper, hold closed-door classified briefings with the House and the Senate on the strike that killed Soleimani.; The House votes to limit the president's ability to order military operations against Iran, unless explicitly authorized by Congress.; President Trump suggests that the reason for the Soleimani strike was to prevent a plot to "blow up the embassy" in Baghdad.; President Trump holds a rally in Toledo, Ohio.; Senate Majority Leader Mitch McConnell endorses a resolution to change Senate rules to allow it to dismiss the articles of impeachment against President Trump if they are not transmitted from the House to the Senate within a period of 25 days.	President Trump announces proposed National Environmental Policy Act regulations
Friday, January 10	In an interview with Fox News's Laura Ingraham, President Trump says Iran had been targeting four American embassies before he ordered the killing of Soleimani. "I can reveal that I believe it would've been four embassies."	Press Briefing with Secretary of State Mike Pompeo and Secretary of the Treasury Steve Mnuchin
Saturday, January 11	Iranian officials admit that the crash of Ukrainian Airlines Flight 752 was caused by a missile strike brought about by human error and increased tensions as a result of "U.S. adventurism".	
Sunday, January 12		
Monday, January 13		
Tuesday, January 14	Speaker of the House Nancy Pelosi announces that the House will vote on Wednesday to send the articles of impeachment against President Trump to the Senate and appoint impeachment managers.; President Trump holds a rally in Milwaukee, Wisconsin.	
Wednesday, January 15	President Trump and Chinese vice premier Liu He sign phase one of a trade deal, pausing two years of the trade war between the two countries.; The House votes 228–193 to transmit the articles of impeachment against President Trump to the Senate and appoints impeachment managers.	President Trump signs phase one of the trade deal between the U.S. and China
Thursday, January 16	The Senate trial on the removal from office of President Trump begins.; The United States–Mexico–Canada Agreement (USMCA), President Trump's replacement for the North American Free Trade Agreement (NAFTA), is ratified by the Senate 89–10.	
Friday, January 17	President Trump entertains the Louisiana State University football team, 2019 College Football Champions, at the White House.	
Saturday, January 18		
Sunday, January 19	President Trump travels to Austin to address the American Farm Bureau, touting the greatness of his administration through achievements such as the trade agreement with China and USMCA.	
Monday, January 20	President Trump completes his third year in office.; President Trump and Vice President Pence visit the Martin Luther King Jr. Memorial.; President Trump's legal team submits a 110-page brief to the Senate concerning the articles of impeachment against him, arguing that adopting those articles was a "dangerous perversion of the Constitution" and that President Trump must be acquitted.	
Tuesday, January 21	President Trump arrives in Switzerland to attend the 2020 Davos World Economic Forum.; President Trump's impeachment trial begins as senators debate procedural rules that will govern the proceedings. Eleven Democratic amendments are rejected 53–47.	
Wednesday, January 22	President Trump returns to the White House from Switzerland.; The Senate votes 53–47 to approve the rules of President Trump's impeachment trial, blocking the inclusion of new evidence or witness testimony.; Opening arguments begin, with impeachment managers accusing Trump of trying to cheat in the upcoming 2020 election, adding that his actions demonstrate that "he believes that he's above the law and scornful of constraint."	
Thursday, January 23	Impeachment managers present their case that President Trump abused his office in an attempt to discredit former vice president Joe Biden, calling on Republican senators to allow new witness testimony.	
Friday, January 24	President Trump delivers remarks at an anti-abortion March for Life rally in Washington, D.C.; Democratic house managers conclude their opening arguments on the first article of impeachment, abuse of power, as well as the second article of impeachment, obstruction of Congress.	
Saturday, January 25	President Trump's legal defense in his impeachment trial begin opening arguments, refuting the accusations made by the impeachment managers and accusing them of trying to remove him from office as they believed they could not win the 2020 presidential election.	
Sunday, January 26		
Monday, January 27	President Trump's legal defense team continue their opening statements arguing that Trump did nothing wrong and the impeachment inquiry was illegitimate from the start. John Bolton makes a claim that he heard Trump say that he (Trump) wanted the freeze on military aid to Ukraine to continue until Ukrainian officials announced investigations into Joe Biden. Alan Dershowitz, a member of President Trump's legal counsel, claims that "nothing in the Bolton revelations, even if true, would rise to the level of an abuse of power, or an impeachable offense."; President Trump holds a bilateral meeting with Israeli prime minister Benjamin Netanyahu at the White House.	President Trump and Israeli prime minister Benjamin Netanyahu
Tuesday, January 28	President Trump holds a joint press conference with Israeli prime minister Benjamin Netanyahu at the White House to announce a proposed Middle East peace plan.; President Trump's legal defense team completes its opening arguments.; President Trump holds a rally in Wildwood, New Jersey.	
Wednesday, January 29	President Trump signs the United States–Mexico–Canada Agreement (USMCA).; U.S. senators begin the two-day question portion in President Trump's impeachment trial. Senate Republicans move to further block new witnesses, instead opting to push the trial to a verdict.	President Trump signs the USMCA
Thursday, January 30	U.S. senators conclude the two-day question period in President Trump's impeachment trial.; President Trump holds a rally in Des Moines, Iowa.	
Friday, January 31	President Trump signs an executive order adding six more countries to his ban on travel from certain mainly-Muslim countries. The added countries are Nigeria, Myanmar, Eritrea, Kyrgyzstan, Sudan, and Tanzania.; The Senate formally blocks an attempt to call new witnesses in President Trump's impeachment trial in a vote of 51–49, with senators Mitt Romney and Susan Collins siding with the Democrats.	

=== February 2020 ===
Date	Events	Photos/videos
Saturday, February 1		
Sunday, February 2	The Trump administration announces travel restrictions on air traffic to and from China take effect. Secretary of Health and Human Services Alex Azar declares that COVID-19 "poses a public health emergency in the United States".	
Monday, February 3	President Trump's legal team and house managers begin closing arguments.; Senator Lisa Murkowski (R-AK) calls President Trump's actions "shameful and wrong" while announcing that she would vote to acquit him. "I cannot vote to convict," Murkowski told the Senate chamber. "The Constitution provides for impeachment but does not demand it in all instances."; President Trump wins the Republican Iowa Caucus.	
Tuesday, February 4	President Trump delivers his third official State of the Union Address.; President Trump awards Rush Limbaugh the Presidential Medal of Freedom during the State of the Union address.; Senator Susan Collins (R-ME) announces that she will vote to acquit President Trump in his impeachment trial, despite saying that what he did was wrong. Collins says her decision is based on the fact that she believes Trump has learned from this case" and "will be more careful in the future".	President Trump delivers his third official State of the Union Address
Wednesday, February 5	President Trump holds a bilateral meeting with Venezuelan opposition leader Juan Guaidó at the White House.; President Trump is acquitted by the United States Senate on charges of "abuse of power" in a vote of 48–52 and "obstruction of Congress" in a vote of 47–53, ending the impeachment trial.; Senator Mitt Romney (R-UT) votes to convict in President Trump's impeachment trial on Article I, becoming the only Republican to do so and the first senator from the same party as the president to vote for removal from office.	
Thursday, February 6	President Trump speaks about politics at the National Prayer Breakfast.; In what he calls a "celebration" President Trump delivers remarks in the White House East Room to supporters following his acquittal in the impeachment trial.; President Trump holds a bilateral meeting with Kenyan president Uhuru Kenyatta at the White House.	President Trump delivers remarks on his acquittal speech President Trump and Kenyan president Uhuru Kenyatta
Friday, February 7	President Trump fires Lieutenant Colonel Alexander Vindman and ambassador Gordon Sondland in retaliation for their cooperation in his impeachment inquiry. Vindman's brother is also fired and escorted from the White House.	
Saturday, February 8		
Sunday, February 9	President Trump attends the National Governors Association dinner.	President Trump and First Lady Melania Trump at the Governor's Ball
Monday, February 10	President Trump holds a rally in Manchester, New Hampshire.	
Tuesday, February 11	President Trump wins the 2020 New Hampshire Republican Primary, with the most votes for any incumbent president in history.; The Justice Department announces that it will overrule federal prosecutors in the trial of Trump associate Roger Stone and seek a shorter sentence than what the prosecutors had recommended. This comes after President Trump had complained on Twitter that the sentence the prosecutors had been recommending to Stone was "unfair" and a "miscarriage of justice".; In response to the DoJ request for a reduced sentence, all four prosecutors (Michael Marando, Adam Jed, Jonathan Kravis and Aaron Zelinsky) withdraw from the Stone trial.	
Wednesday, February 12	President Trump holds a bilateral meeting with Ecuadorian president Lenín Moreno at the White House.; Jessie Liu, the U.S. attorney who headed the prosecutions of Roger Stone and Michael Flynn, resigns after President Trump's withdrawal of her nomination as the Treasury Department's undersecretary for terrorism and financial crimes.	President Trump and Ecuadorian president Lenín Moreno
Thursday, February 13	President Trump publicly acknowledges sending Rudy Giuliani to Ukraine in an attempt to find damaging information on Joe and Hunter Biden, despite his fervent denials of such a search during his impeachment inquiry and trial.	
Friday, February 14	Army Secretary Ryan McCarthy announces that the Army will not investigate or take any disciplinary action against Lieutenant Colonel Alexander Vindman in spite of President Trump's comment that the military should "take a look at" whether Vindman said "horrible things" about him.; Justice Department attorney J.P. Cooney says, "The Government has decided not to pursue criminal charges against ... Andrew G. McCabe ...", ending the nearly two-year-long investigation.	
Saturday, February 15		
Sunday, February 16	More than 2,000 former Justice Department officials present an open letter strongly condemning President Trump and Attorney General William Barr's "interference in the fair administration of justice", and call on Barr to resign due to his involvement in the Stone case.	
Monday, February 17		
Tuesday, February 18	President Trump commutes the sentences of eleven individuals, including former Illinois governor Rod Blagojevich, who was convicted of attempting to sell a seat in the U.S. Senate, former NYPD commissioner Bernie Kerik, financier Mike Milken, and Eddie DeBartolo Jr., all of whom were convicted on corruption charges.	
Wednesday, February 19	President Trump holds a rally in Phoenix, Arizona.	President Trump speaks to supporters at a rally in Phoenix, Arizona
Thursday, February 20	President Trump fires acting director of national intelligence, Joseph Maguire, after last weeks briefing to the House Intelligence Committee by the top election security official, Shelby Pierson, on Russian interference in the upcoming 2020 election. The president announced that he was replacing Maguire with Richard Grenell, the current ambassador to Germany, who will oversee 17 U.S. intelligence agencies.; President Trump holds a rally in Colorado Springs, Colorado.; Roger Stone is sentenced to 40 months in prison for, in the words of Judge Amy Berman Jackson, "covering up for the president".	
Friday, February 21	President Trump holds a rally in Las Vegas, Nevada.	
Saturday, February 22		
Sunday, February 23		
Monday, February 24	President Trump begins a two-day state visit to India.; President Trump attends a "Namaste, Trump" rally in Gujarat and visits the Taj Mahal.	President Trump and First Lady Melania Trump in front of the Taj Mahal
Tuesday, February 25	President Trump holds a bilateral meeting and joint press conference with Indian prime minister Narendra Modi.; President Trump attends a state dinner hosted by Indian president Ram Nath Kovind.; Supreme Court Justices Sonia Sotomayor and Ruth Bader Ginsburg are attacked on Twitter by President Trump as he demands that they recuse themselves from "all Trump, or Trump-related" cases.; In a press briefing at the White House, Nancy Messonnier, Director of National Center for Immunization and Respiratory Diseases warned of the impending community spread of COVID-19 in the United States, stating: "Disruption to everyday life might be severe."	President Trump and Indian prime minister Narendra Modi Trump speech
Wednesday, February 26	President Trump and First Lady Melania Trump return to Washington after a two-day trip to India.; At the onset of the COVID-19 pandemic, President Trump announces vice-president Mike Pence to be in charge of the U.S. COVID-19 response.	President Trump and members of the COVID-19 task force hold a news conference (February 26, 2020)
Thursday, February 27		
Friday, February 28	President Trump holds a rally in North Charleston, South Carolina.; President Trump tweets that he will nominate Representative John Ratcliffe (R-TX) to be his director of national intelligence.; National Economic Council Director Larry Kudlow responds from the White House to questions about COVID-19.	
Saturday, February 29	President Trump delivers a speech in Oxon Hill, Maryland, to the 2020 Conservative Political Action Conference.; The first patient death in the United States from COVID-19 is reported by Washington state health officials.	President Trump at the 2020 CPAC President Trump and members of COVID-19 task force hold a news conference (February 29, 2020)

=== March 2020 ===
Date	Events	Photos/videos
Sunday, March 1		
Monday, March 2	President Trump holds a bilateral meeting with Colombian president Iván Duque Márquez at the White House.; President Trump holds a rally in Charlotte, North Carolina.; President Trump meets with representatives from numerous pharmaceutical companies in an effort to develop an efficient plan to develop a vaccine and treatments for COVID-19.	President Trump and Colombian president Iván Duque Márquez President Trump and members of COVID-19 task force meet with pharmaceutical executives
Tuesday, March 3	President Trump speaks to the press concerning the COVID-19 pandemic in the United States after Trump was criticized for his delayed response to the virus. Trump also disputed the World Health Organization's (WHO) official mortality rate for the virus of 3.4%, instead claiming the death rate to be "a fraction of 1%".	President Trump and COVID-19 team members talk to press
Wednesday, March 4	The total number of deaths in the United States from COVID-19 is eleven: ten in Washington state and one in California.	
Thursday, March 5		
Friday, March 6	President Trump signs COVID-19 Preparedness and Response Supplemental Appropriations Act into law.; While visiting the CDC center in Atlanta, Georgia, President Trump praises the CDC's response to COVID-19. Trump also calls Washington state governor Jay Inslee "a snake" for criticizing his response to the COVID-19 pandemic after Inslee called on Trump to "[stick] to the science and [tell] the truth".; President Trump fires acting chief of staff Mick Mulvaney and announces Representative Mark Meadows (R-NC) as his replacement.	President Trump signs COVID-19 Response Act President Trump visits the Centers for Disease Control and Prevention
Saturday, March 7	President Trump holds a working dinner with Brazilian president Jair Bolsonaro at Mar-a-Lago.	President Trump and Brazilian president Jair Bolsonaro at Mar-a-Lago
Sunday, March 8		
Monday, March 9		President Trump and members of COVID-19 task force hold a news conference (March 9, 2020)
Tuesday, March 10	President Trump presents the Medal of Freedom to General Jack Keane.	President Trump awards the Presidential Medal of Freedom to John Keane
Wednesday, March 11	The total number of deaths in the United States from COVID-19 is 31. Twenty-four are in Washington state, two are in California, two are in Florida and one is in New Jersey. There are 1,004 total cases in the United States.; President Trump addresses the nation on prime-time television concerning the COVID-19 pandemic as the total number of confirmed cases passes a thousand. During the address, Trump announces that he will suspend all travel to and from Europe for thirty days, starting midnight Friday. The United Kingdom is exempt from this restriction.	President Trump addresses the nation on the COVID-19 pandemic
Thursday, March 12	President Trump holds a bilateral meeting with Taoiseach Leo Varadkar of Ireland at the White House.; Due to the COVID-19 pandemic, the Dow Jones Industrial Average (DJIA) drops ten percent—its worst day since 1987.	President Trump and Taoiseach Leo Varadkar (Prime Minister of Ireland)
Friday, March 13	President Trump declares a national emergency to mitigate the COVID-19 pandemic. The declaration opens access to $50 billion in emergency funding, lifts restrictions on doctors and hospitals, and waives student loan interest. When challenged about the slow response to provide testing, Trump blamed prior administrations saying, "I don't take responsibility at all."	President Trump declares the COVID-19 pandemic a national emergency
Saturday, March 14		President Trump and members of COVID-19 task force hold a news conference (March 14, 2020)
Sunday, March 15	Due to the COVID-19 pandemic, the Federal Reserve cuts interest rates to zero and releases $700 billion in quantitative easing.	President Trump and members of COVID-19 task force hold a news conference (March 15, 2020)
Monday, March 16	In a press conference at the White House, President Trump urges Americans to avoid gatherings of more than ten people, warning that the COVID-19 pandemic could last into the summer.; The Dow Jones Industrial Average (DJIA) falls 2,997 points, losing 12.9% in its largest point drop ever.	President Trump and members of COVID-19 task force hold a news conference (March 16, 2020)
Tuesday, March 17	President Trump clinches enough delegates to officially become the presumptive nominee of the Republican Party.	President Trump and members of COVID-19 task force hold a news conference (March 17, 2020)
Wednesday, March 18	The number of deaths in the United States from COVID-19 disease is 150. 68 deaths are in Washington state, 20 in New York state, 16 in California, 8 in Florida, 7 in Louisiana and 5 in New Jersey. 15 other states have recorded deaths which combined are 26. There are 5,726 total cases in the United States.; President Trump signs the Families First Coronavirus Response Act, a bill providing sick leave, unemployment benefits, free COVID-19 testing, and food and medical aid to people affected by the COVID-19 pandemic, into law.; In an effort to mitigate the COVID-19 pandemic, President Trump and Canadian prime minister Justin Trudeau close the border between the United States and Canada, allowing only essential traffic through.	President Trump and members of COVID-19 task force hold a news conference (March 18, 2020) President Trump signs the Families First Act
Thursday, March 19		President Trump and members of COVID-19 task force hold a news conference (March 19, 2020) Governors and President Trump, teleconference March 19
Friday, March 20		President Trump and members of COVID-19 task force hold a news conference (March 20, 2020)
Saturday, March 21	President Trump announces in a press conference that he will invoke the Defense Production Act to increase production of hospital masks, saying he views the country as entering a wartime setting and that he is "a wartime president".	President Trump and members of COVID-19 task force hold a news conference (March 21, 2020)
Sunday, March 22		President Trump and members of COVID-19 task force hold a news conference (March 22, 2020)
Monday, March 23		
Tuesday, March 24	In a virtual town hall held at the White House, President Trump declares that his hope is that the American economy will open back up by Easter Sunday, eliciting concerns from the medical and scientific community. He also expressed desire to ease social distancing restrictions set up to control the spread of COVID-19.	
Wednesday, March 25	The number of deaths in the United States from COVID-19 disease is 826. Two hundred eighty-six are in New York state, one hundred twenty-six in Washington state, fifty-eight in California, forty-six in Louisiana and thirty-eight in Georgia. Thirty-six other states have recorded deaths which combined are two hundred seventy-four. There are 53,852 total cases in the United States.; The Senate passes the $2 trillion Coronavirus Aid, Relief, and Economic Security Act (H.R. 748), also known as the CARES Act, in a vote of 96–0.	
Thursday, March 26		
Friday, March 27	The House passes the $2.2 trillion Coronavirus Aid, Relief, and Economic Security Act (CARES Act), with President Trump signing the Act into law later that same day.; In a press conference on the COVID-19 pandemic, President Trump announces that the government will buy more than 100,000 ventilators to meet growing demand. Officials are doubtful whether they can be produced in time to help hospitals that are currently overwhelmed with patients.	President Trump signs the CARES Act
Saturday, March 28	President Trump visits Naval Air Station Norfolk to watch the Navy hospital ship Comfort depart for New York City.	President Trump at Naval Air Station Norfolk
Sunday, March 29		
Monday, March 30		
Tuesday, March 31		

== See also ==
- First 100 days of the first Trump presidency – Period from January to April 2017
- List of executive actions by Donald Trump
- Lists of presidential trips made by Donald Trump (international trips)
- First presidential transition of Donald Trump – Transfer of presidential power from Barack Obama to Donald Trump
- Timeline of the 2016 United States presidential election

U.S. presidential administration timelines
Preceded by First Trump presidency (2019 Q4)	First Trump presidency (2020 Q1)	Succeeded by First Trump presidency (2020 Q2)
