= Taylor Field (disambiguation) =

Taylor Field was a Canadian football stadium in Regina, Saskatchewan.

Taylor Field may also refer to:

- Taylor Field (Alabama), a former military airfield near Montgomery, Alabama
- Taylor Field (Florida), a former airport and military airfield near Ocala, Florida
- Taylor Field (Campbell University), a sport venue in Buies Creek, North Carolina
- Taylor Field (Pine Bluff, Arkansas), a baseball stadium

== See also ==
- DeLand Municipal Airport or Sidney H. Taylor Field, an airport in DeLand, Florida
- Ocala International Airport or Jim Taylor Field, an airport in Ocala, Florida
