= Timeline of the Donald Trump presidencies =

Donald Trump, a Republican originally from New York, who moved his principal residency to Florida in 2019, was elected president of the United States in 2016.

Trump was inaugurated on January 20, 2017, as the nation's 45th president, and his presidency ended on January 20, 2021, with the inauguration of Joe Biden. He was then elected to a non-consecutive second term in 2024, and assumed the presidency again on January 20, 2025, as the nation's 47th president.

The following articles cover the timeline of Trump's first and second presidencies, and the time leading up to each of them:

== First presidency (2017–2021) ==
- Pre-presidency: 2015–2017
  - Donald Trump 2016 presidential campaign
  - First presidential transition of Donald Trump
- First presidency: 2017
  - First 100 days of the first Trump presidency
  - Timeline of the first Trump presidency (2017 Q1)
  - Timeline of the first Trump presidency (2017 Q2)
  - Timeline of the first Trump presidency (2017 Q3)
  - Timeline of the first Trump presidency (2017 Q4)
- First presidency: 2018
  - Timeline of the first Trump presidency (2018 Q1)
  - Timeline of the first Trump presidency (2018 Q2)
  - Timeline of the first Trump presidency (2018 Q3)
  - Timeline of the first Trump presidency (2018 Q4)
- First presidency: 2019
  - Timeline of the first Trump presidency (2019 Q1)
  - Timeline of the first Trump presidency (2019 Q2)
  - Timeline of the first Trump presidency (2019 Q3)
  - Timeline of the first Trump presidency (2019 Q4)
- First presidency: 2020–2021
  - Timeline of the first Trump presidency (2020 Q1)
  - Timeline of the first Trump presidency (2020 Q2)
  - Timeline of the first Trump presidency (2020 Q3)
  - Timeline of the first Trump presidency (2020 Q4–January 2021)

== Second presidency (2025–present) ==
- Between presidencies: 2021–2025
  - Donald Trump 2024 presidential campaign
  - Second presidential transition of Donald Trump
- Second presidency: 2025
  - First 100 days of the second Trump presidency
  - Timeline of the second Trump presidency (2025 Q1)
  - Timeline of the second Trump presidency (2025 Q2)
  - Timeline of the second Trump presidency (2025 Q3)
  - Timeline of the second Trump presidency (2025 Q4)
- Second presidency: 2026
  - Timeline of the second Trump presidency (2026 Q1)
  - Timeline of the second Trump presidency (2026 Q2)
  - Timeline of the second Trump presidency (2026 Q3)
  - Timeline of the second Trump presidency (2026 Q4)

== See also ==
- Timeline of the Barack Obama presidency, for his first-term predecessor
- Timeline of the Joe Biden presidency, for his first-term successor and second-term predecessor
