= Taylor Field (Florida) =

Airport in Marion County, Florida

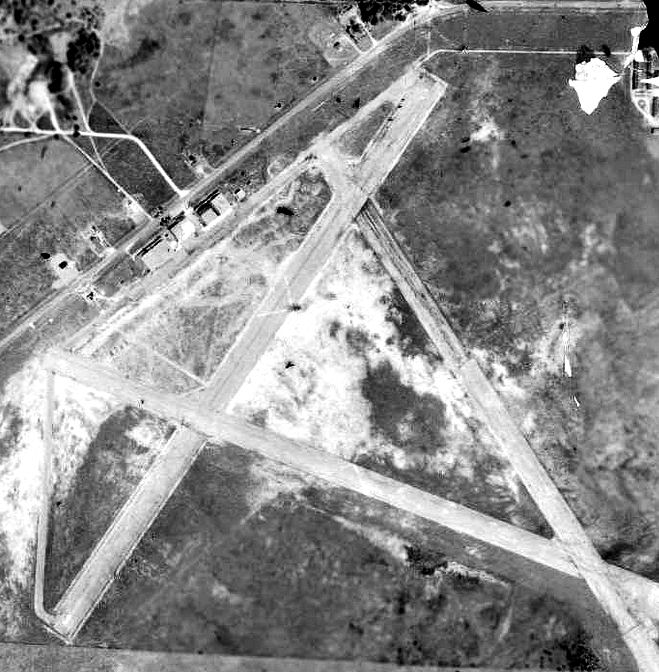
- 1949 airphoto
- IATA: none; ICAO: none

Summary
- Serves: Ocala, Florida
- Coordinates: 29°10′N 082°10′W

Map
- Location of Taylor Field

Taylor Field, now an industrial park, was an airport and military airfield located near Ocala, Florida. It was closed in 1962 and replaced by Ocala International Airport-Jim Taylor Field.

== History ==
Taylor Field opened about 1933 as a municipal airport near Ocala. The airport had 2 paved runways, with the longest being the 3,900' northeast/southwest strip. A paved taxiway led to a paved ramp on the north side of the field. It was named Taylor Field after the original donor of the property, James Taylor.

In November 1941, Taylor Field was turned into a basic (level 1) pilot training airfield by the United States Army Air Forces. It was then assigned to USAAF Southeast Training Center (later Eastern Flying Training Command). It later contracted with Greenville Aviation School to conduct basic flying training.

Flying training was performed with Fairchild PT-19s as the primary trainer. Also, it had several PT-17 Stearmans and a few P-40 Warhawks assigned. The flight school also operated two auxiliary airfields in the local area. Over 5,000 cadets received primary flight training at the airport during World War II.

On 8 September 1944, it was inactivated with the drawdown of AAFTC's pilot training program, was declared surplus, and returned to civil control as a public airport until being replaced and closed in 1962. Today, there is little evidence of its existence.((29.1726686, -82.1537900))

== See also ==
- Florida World War II Army Airfields
- 29th Flying Training Wing (World War II)
