= International Church of Las Vegas =

Evangelical church in Nevada, US

International Church of Las Vegas (ICLV) is affiliated with the Assemblies of God, headquartered in Las Vegas, Nevada. Andrew and Camille Mason are the Lead Pastors. The church website describes its mission to live awakened, be transformed and build His kingdom.

The church has one main location in the Summerlin area of Las Vegas.

- (ICLV) Summerlin Main Campus at 8100 Westcliff Drive, Las Vegas, NV 89145 (36.1749°N 115.2706°W)

The church also hosts the International Christian Academy, which educates students ranging from preschool through grade 8.
