= Taylor County Airport =

Taylor County Airport may refer to:

- Taylor County Airport (Kentucky) in Campbellsville, Taylor County, Kentucky, United States (FAA: AAS)
- Taylor County Airport (Wisconsin) in Medford, Taylor County, Wisconsin, United States (FAA: MDZ)
