= List of presidential trips made by Donald Trump (2020–21) =

This is a list of presidential trips made by Donald Trump during 2020 and early 2021, the final years of his first presidency as the 45th president of the United States. Due to the COVID-19 pandemic, travel and many in-person meetings were curtailed and replaced with telephone calls and virtual meetings.

This list excludes trips made within Washington, D.C., the US federal capital in which the White House, the official residence and principal workplace of the president, is located. Also excluded are trips to Camp David, the country residence of the president, as well as Joint Base Andrews. International trips are included. The number of visits per state or territory where he traveled are:

- One visit to: Colorado, Delaware, Nebraska, Oklahoma, South Carolina and South Dakota
- Two visits to: Louisiana, Maine and Tennessee
- Three visits to: New Hampshire
- Four visits to: California, Iowa, Minnesota and New York
- Five visits to: Ohio and Texas
- Seven visits to: Arizona, Georgia, Maryland and Nevada
- Eight visits to: New Jersey
- Nine visits to: Michigan
- Ten visits to: Wisconsin
- Thirteen visits to: Pennsylvania
- Fourteen visits to: North Carolina
- Nineteen visits to: Florida
- Thirty-seven visits to: Virginia
Locations in the contiguous United States that President Donald Trump has visited in 2020 and in January 2021.

January (blue) – February (yellow) – March (brown) – April (pink) – May (grey) – June (orange) – July (purple) – August (light blue) – September (magenta) – October (green) – November (red) – December (light green)

January ‘21 (gold)

Map of trips made by Donald Trump within the United States in 2020 and in January 2021: Washington, D.C. 7 or more visits 6 visits 5 visits 4 visits 3 visits 2 visits 1 visit No visits

== January 2020 ==
Country/ U.S. state	Areas visited	Dates	Details	Image
Florida	Mar-a-Lago, West Palm Beach, Miami	January 1–5	President Trump and First Lady Melania Trump continued their vacation in Florida. On January 1 and 2, President Trump traveled again to the Trump International Golf Club. On January 3, President Trump attended a rally at the El Rey Jesús mega church in Miami hosted by his “coalition of evangelicals.”	
Ohio	Toledo	January 9	Arriving via Toledo Express Airport, President Trump held a Keep America Great Rally at the Huntington Center.	
Louisiana	New Orleans	January 13	Arriving via Louis Armstrong New Orleans International Airport, President Trump and First Lady Melania Trump attended the CFP National Championship Game between Clemson University and Louisiana State University at the Mercedes-Benz Superdome.	
Wisconsin	Milwaukee	January 14	Arriving via General Mitchell International Airport, President Trump held a Keep America Great Rally at the UW–Milwaukee Panther Arena.	
Florida	Mar-a-Lago	January 17–19	Arriving via Palm Beach International Airport, President Trump and First Lady Melania Trump traveled to Mar-a-Lago for the weekend.	
Texas	Austin	January 19	Arriving via Austin-Bergstrom International Airport, President Trump addressed the American Farm Bureau Federation at the Austin Convention Center.	
Switzerland	Davos	January 21–22	Arriving via Zürich Airport, President Trump flew to Davos on Marine One, landing at the Intercontinental Davos Landing Zone. He stayed at the InterContinental Davos. He attended the World Economic Forum, where he spoke on January 22. He held bilateral meetings with European Commission president Ursula von der Leyen, Swiss president Simonetta Sommaruga, Pakistani prime minister Imran Khan, Iraqi Kurdish president Nechirvan Barzani and Iraqi president Barham Salih.	
Florida	Doral	January 23	Arriving via Miami International Airport, President Trump addressed the Republican National Committee Winter Meeting at the Trump National Doral Miami.	
New Jersey	Wildwood	January 28	Arriving via Atlantic City International Airport, President Trump flew to Wildwood on Marine One, landing at Cape May Airport. President Trump held a Keep America Great Rally at the Wildwoods Convention Center.	
Michigan	Warren	January 30	Arriving via Selfridge Air National Guard Base, President Trump spoke at Dana Incorporated to celebrate the signing of the USMCA.	
Iowa	Des Moines	January 30	Arriving via Des Moines International Airport, President Trump held a Keep America Great Rally at the Knapp Center on the campus of Drake University.	
Florida	Mar-a-Lago	January 31	Arriving via Palm Beach International Airport, President Trump and First Lady Melania Trump traveled to Mar-a-Lago for the weekend.	

== February ==
Country/ U.S. state	Areas visited	Dates	Details	Image
Florida	Mar-a-Lago, West Palm Beach	February 1–2	President Trump and First Lady Melania Trump continued their weekend vacation in Florida, attending a Super Bowl party on Sunday night. President Trump golfed at Trump International Golf Club on Saturday and Sunday.	
North Carolina	Charlotte	February 7	Arriving via Charlotte Douglas International Airport, President Trump spoke at the North Carolina Opportunity Now Summit on the campus of Central Piedmont Community College.	
New Hampshire	Manchester	February 10	Arriving via Manchester–Boston Regional Airport, President Trump held a Keep America Great Rally at the SNHU Arena.	
Delaware	Dover	February 10	President Trump stopped at Dover Air Force Base on his way back from New Hampshire to pay respects to two American troops killed in an insider attack in Afghanistan.	
Virginia	Rosslyn	February 13	President Trump visited the annex office of the Republican National Committee.	
Florida	Mar-a-Lago, West Palm Beach, Palm Beach, Daytona Beach	February 14–16	Arriving via Palm Beach International Airport, President Trump and First Lady Melania Trump traveled to Mar-a-Lago for the weekend. On Saturday the President golfed at Trump International Golf Club in West Palm Beach. On Saturday night he attended a fundraiser at the home of Nelson Peltz in Palm Beach. On February 16, they flew to Daytona Beach International Airport and attended the Daytona 500 at Daytona International Speedway. President Trump was the first sitting president to be appointed Grand Marshal of the race.	
California	Beverly Hills	February 18	Arriving via Los Angeles International Airport and traveling to Santa Monica Airport on Marine One, President Trump spent the afternoon in Beverly Hills at the Montage Beverly Hills. There the president met with the members of the United States Olympic & Paralympic Committee and LA 2028 organizers. The president then held a fundraiser at the hotel.	
Nevada	Las Vegas	February 18–19	Arriving via McCarran International Airport, President Trump spent the night at the Trump International Hotel Las Vegas.	
California	Rancho Mirage, Bakersfield	February 19	Arriving via Palm Springs International Airport, President Trump participated in a roundtable with supporters at the Porcupine Creek Golf Club. The president then held a fundraiser at Larry Ellison's private home on the same property. He flew to Meadows Field Airport and delivered remarks to Rural Stakeholders on California Water Accessibility at the JACO Hangar in Meadows Field Airport.	
Arizona	Phoenix	February 19	Arriving via Phoenix Sky Harbor International Airport, President Trump held a Keep America Great Rally at the Arizona Veterans Memorial Coliseum.	
Nevada	Las Vegas	February 19–20	Arriving via McCarran International Airport, President Trump returned to Las Vegas to again spend the night at the Trump International Hotel Las Vegas. On February 20, President Trump delivered the Commencement Address at the Hope for Prisoners Graduation Ceremony at the Las Vegas Metropolitan Police Department.	
Colorado	Colorado Springs	February 20	Arriving via Peterson Air Force Base, President Trump held a Keep America Great Rally at the Broadmoor World Arena.	
Nevada	Las Vegas	February 20–21	Arriving via McCarran International Airport, President Trump returned to Las Vegas to again spend the night at the Trump International Hotel Las Vegas. On February 21, President Trump held a Keep America Great Rally at the Las Vegas Convention Center before returning to Washington.	
India	Ahmedabad, Agra, New Delhi	February 24–25	President Trump and the First Lady left Washington for India on February 23, with a stop at Ramstein Air Base in Rhineland-Palatinate, Germany to refuel. They landed at Sardar Vallabhbhai Patel International Airport in Ahmebadad on Monday morning. The President was greeted by Prime Minister of India Narendra Modi. He then visited the Gandhi Ashram in Ahmedabad. The President and the First Lady then participated in a Namaste Trump Rally at Motera Stadium, the largest cricket stadium in the world. They then flew to Agra, arriving via Agra Air Base, where they toured the Taj Mahal. They then flew to New Delhi, arriving via Palam Air Force Station, where they spent the night at the ITC Maurya. On Tuesday the President participated in a welcome ceremony at the Rashtrapati Bhavan with President of India Ram Nath Kovind. He then visited the Raj Ghat memorial. He then visited the Hyderabad House, where he held bilateral meetings and a joint press statement with Prime Minister Modi. He then visited the U.S. Embassy in New Delhi. He then returned to the Rashtrapati Bhavan for a state dinner with President Kovind before flying home on Air Force One.	
South Carolina	North Charleston	February 28	Arriving via Charleston International Airport, President Trump held a Keep America Great Rally at the North Charleston Coliseum & Performing Arts Center.	
Maryland	National Harbor	February 29	President Trump spoke at CPAC 2020, which was held at the Gaylord National Resort & Convention Center.	

== March ==
Country/ U.S. state	Areas visited	Dates	Details	Image
North Carolina	Charlotte	March 2	Arriving via Charlotte Douglas International Airport, President Trump held a Keep America Great Rally at the Bojangles' Coliseum.	
Maryland	Bethesda	March 3	President Trump visited the Vaccine Research Center and the Viral Pathogenesis Laboratory at the National Institutes of Health.	
Pennsylvania	Scranton	March 5	Arriving via Wilkes-Barre/Scranton International Airport, President Trump participated in a Fox News Town Hall event at the Scranton Cultural Center.	
Tennessee	Nashville, Cookeville	March 6	Arriving via Nashville International Airport, President Trump visited both Nashville and Cookeville to survey areas damaged in the March 2020 Tennessee tornado outbreak.	
Georgia	Atlanta	March 6	Arriving via Dobbins Air Reserve Base, President Trump visited the CDC headquarters in Atlanta, where he was given a tour and checked on the health agency's progress in containing the ongoing coronavirus pandemic.	
Florida	Mar-a-Lago, West Palm Beach	March 6–9	Arriving via Palm Beach International Airport, President Trump traveled to Mar-a-Lago for the weekend. He traveled to the Trump International Golf Club to play golf on March 7 and 8. President Trump hosted President of Brazil Jair Bolsonaro at Mar-a-Lago on March 7.	
Florida	Longwood	March 9	Arriving via Orlando Sanford International Airport, President Trump held a fundraiser at the home of Bob Dello Russo.	
Virginia	Norfolk	March 28	Arriving via Naval Station Norfolk Chambers Field, President Trump visited Norfolk to see off hospital ship USNS Comfort, which was heading to New York City to aid coronavirus response.	

== April ==
- No trips made.

== May ==
Country/ U.S. state	Areas visited	Dates	Details	Image
Arizona	Phoenix	May 5	Arriving via Phoenix Sky Harbor International Airport, President Trump traveled to the Honeywell Aerospace headquarters in Phoenix to tour the factory where they produced N95 masks and to discuss the re-opening of the country amid the coronavirus pandemic. President Trump also held a roundtable discussion on supporting Native Americans.	
Pennsylvania	Upper Macungie Township	May 14	Arriving via Lehigh Valley International Airport, President Trump traveled to the Owens & Minor medical distributor in Upper Macungie to tour the factory where he discussed Coronavirus testing and efforts to build the nation's stockpile of medical equipment.	
Michigan	Ypsilanti	May 21	Arriving via Detroit Metropolitan Airport, President Trump traveled to the Ford Rawsonville Components Plant in Ypsilanti to tour the factory where they have been producing ventilators. President Trump also held a roundtable discussion with African-American leaders.	
Virginia	Sterling	May 23	President Trump played golf at Trump National D.C.	
Virginia	Sterling	May 24	President Trump played golf at Trump National D.C.	
Virginia	Arlington	May 25	President Trump and First Lady Melania Trump traveled to Arlington National Cemetery for Memorial Day, where he participated in a wreath-laying ceremony at the Tomb of the Unknown Soldier.	
Maryland	Baltimore	May 25	President Trump and First Lady Melania Trump traveled to Baltimore by Marine One, where he participated in a ceremony celebrating Memorial Day and delivered remarks at the Fort McHenry National Monument.	
Florida	Cape Canaveral	May 27	Arriving via the Shuttle Landing Facility, President Trump and First Lady Melania Trump traveled to the Neil Armstrong Operations and Checkout Building in Cape Canaveral, where they toured an Orion Capsules and then received a SpaceX Dragon 2 spacecraft launch briefing, along with Vice President Pence and Second Lady Karen Pence. President Trump and First Lady Melania Trump were originally scheduled to attend the attempted launch of the SpaceX Dragon 2 spacecraft from the Kennedy Space Center. However, the launch was postponed to May 30 due to the weather.	
Florida	Cape Canaveral	May 30	Arriving via the Shuttle Landing Facility, President Trump returned to Cape Canaveral to attend the second attempted launch of the SpaceX Dragon 2 spacecraft from the Kennedy Space Center, along with Vice President Pence and Second Lady Karen Pence. President Trump delivered the remarks at the Vehicle Assembly Building after the launch was finally successful.	

== June ==
Country/ U.S. state	Areas visited	Dates	Details	Image
Maine	Bangor, Guilford	June 5	Arriving via Bangor International Airport, President Trump participated in a roundtable on supporting America's commercial fishermen. He then flew to Guilford on Marine One to visit a plant where they manufacture swabs for COVID testing.	
Texas	Dallas	June 11	Arriving via Dallas Love Field Airport, President Trump participated in a Roundtable at the Gateway Church Dallas Campus, and then attended a Republican fundraiser at the home of Kelcy Warren, the CEO of Energy Transfer Partners, whose company built the controversial Dakota Access Pipeline.	
New Jersey	Bedminster	June 11–13	Arriving via Newark Liberty International Airport, President Trump spent the weekend at Trump National Golf Club.	
New York	West Point	June 13	President Trump flew on Marine One to West Point, landing on The Plain. He delivered the commencement address at the United States Military Academy.	
New Jersey	Bedminster	June 13–14	President Trump returned to New Jersey to spend the rest of the weekend at Trump National Golf Club. He returned to Washington via Morristown Municipal Airport.	
Oklahoma	Tulsa	June 20	Arriving via Tulsa International Airport, President Trump held a Keep America Great Rally at the BOK Center.	
Virginia	Sterling	June 21	President Trump played golf at Trump National D.C.	
Arizona	Yuma, Phoenix	June 23	Arriving via Marine Corps Air Station Yuma, President Trump visited the sections of the US–Mexico border wall in Yuma. He then flew to Phoenix Sky Harbor International Airport, and held a 'Student for Trump' rally at the Dream City Church in Phoenix.	
Wisconsin	Green Bay, Marinette	June 25	Arriving via Austin Straubel International Airport, President Trump participated in a Fox News Town Hall at the Jet Air Group Facilities. He then flew on Marine One to Menominee–Marinette Twin County Airport to visit Fincantieri Marinette Marine.	President Trump Travels to Wisconsin (50046757343)
Virginia	Sterling	June 27	President Trump played golf at Trump National D.C.	
Virginia	Sterling	June 28	President Trump played golf at Trump National D.C. with Senator Lindsey Graham.	

== July ==
Country/ U.S. state	Areas visited	Dates	Details	Image
Virginia	Sterling	July 3	President Trump played golf at Trump National D.C.	
South Dakota	Keystone	July 3	Arriving via Ellsworth Air Force Base, President Trump flew to Keystone on Marine One. President Trump visited the Sculptor's Studio, and spoke at Mount Rushmore before a fireworks display in honor of Independence Day.	
Virginia	Sterling	July 5	President Trump played golf at Trump National D.C.	
Florida	Doral, Hillsboro Beach	July 10	Arriving via Miami International Airport, President Trump traveled to USSOUTHCOM in Doral where he received a briefing on SOUTHCOM Enhanced Counternarcotics Operations and delivered remarks on efforts to stem the flow of illicit drugs. Immediately following, President Trump traveled to the Iglesia Doral Jesus Worship Center to participate in a roundtable on "Supporting the People of Venezuela" which included Congressman Mario Díaz-Balart. Shortly thereafter, President Trump's motorcade made a brief stop at the Trump National Doral Resort before departing Miami en route to Hillsboro Beach via Fort Lauderdale–Hollywood International Airport, where President Trump attended a fundraiser at the private residence of Troy Link, CEO of Link Snacks.	
Virginia	Sterling	July 11	President Trump played golf at Trump National D.C.	
Maryland	Bethesda	July 11	President Trump traveled on Marine One to Walter Reed National Military Medical Center to visit with wounded service members and their families as well as healthcare staff who have been caring for COVID-19 patients. President Trump was accompanied by White House Chief of Staff Mark Meadows.	
Virginia	Sterling	July 12	President Trump played golf at Trump National D.C.	
Georgia	Hapeville	July 15	Arriving via Hartsfield–Jackson Atlanta International Airport, President Trump spoke at the UPS Hapeville Airport Hub to discuss transportation and infrastructure projects. President Trump was accompanied by Senators Loeffler and Perdue as well as by Governor Kemp and Representative Collins.	TrumpUPSAtlantaHub2020
Virginia	Sterling	July 18	President Trump played golf at Trump National D.C. with Senator Lindsey Graham.	
Virginia	Sterling	July 19	President Trump played golf at Trump National D.C. with Senator Lindsey Graham.	
New Jersey	Bedminster	July 24–26	Arriving via Morristown Municipal Airport and flying to Bedminster on Marine One, President Trump spent the weekend at Trump National Bedminster. On July 25, Trump played golf with NFL Hall of Famer Brett Favre, and later attended an event hosted by America First Action Super PAC.	President Trump and Brett Favre (50159265167)
North Carolina	Morrisville	July 27	Arriving via Raleigh-Durham International Airport, President Trump visited and toured the Fujifilm Diosynth Biotechnologies’ Innovation Center in Morrisville.	
Texas	Odessa, Midland	July 29	Arriving via Midland International Air and Space Port, President Trump participated a fundraising event at the Odessa Marriott Hotel and Conference Center. Accompanied by Senator Ted Cruz, Governor Greg Abbott, and Former Energy Secretary Rick Perry, President Trump then visited and toured the Double Eagle Energy oil rig before authorizing a series of construction and operation permits along the southern border with Mexico.	President Trump in Texas (50169668378)
Florida	Tampa, Belleair	July 31	Arriving via Tampa International Airport, President Trump participated in a Campaign Coalitions Event with Florida Sheriffs. He then participated in a COVID-19 Response and Storm Preparedness round table, before speaking at a fundraising dinner at the Pelican Golf Club.	

== August ==
Country/ U.S. state	Areas visited	Dates	Details	Image
Virginia	Sterling	August 1	President Trump played golf at Trump National D.C.	
Virginia	Sterling	August 2	President Trump played golf at Trump National D.C.	
Ohio	Cleveland, Clyde, Bratenahl	August 6	Arriving via Cleveland Burke Lakefront Airport, President Trump delivered remarks on Economic Prosperity. He then flew on Marine One to Sandusky County Regional Airport to tour and deliver remarks at Whirlpool Corp. He then returned to Cleveland on Marine One, and drove to the Shoreby Yacht Club in Bratenahl, where he delivered remarks at a fundraising committee reception. He then returned to Cleveland, and flew to New Jersey.	
New Jersey	Bedminster	August 6–8	Arriving via Morristown Municipal Airport and flying to Bedminster on Marine One, President Trump spent the night at Trump National Golf Club.	
New York	Southampton, Water Mill	August 8	Flying on Marine One to Southampton High School, President Trump attended fundraisers at the private residences of hedge fund manager John Paulson in Southampton, and his son Donald Trump Jr. in Water Mill.	
New Jersey	Bedminster, Long Branch	August 8–9	President Trump returned to New Jersey to spend the rest of the weekend at Trump National Bedminster. On August 9, flew on Marine One to George L. Catrambone Elementary School in Elberon, President Trump attended a fundraiser at the private residence of the late Stanley Chera, a real estate mogul and personal friend of the President who died from COVID-19. He then returned to Washington via Morristown Municipal Airport.	
New York	Manhattan	August 14	Arriving via Morristown Municipal Airport and flying to the Downtown Manhattan Heliport on Marine One, President Trump visited his younger brother Robert Trump at NewYork-Presbyterian Lower Manhattan Hospital.	
New Jersey	Bedminster	August 14–16	Flying from Manhattan to Bedminster on Marine One, President Trump spent the weekend at Trump National Golf Club.	
Minnesota	Minneapolis, Mankato	August 17	President Trump delivered remarks on "Jobs and the Economy" at Minneapolis–Saint Paul International Airport. He then flew to Mankato Regional Airport and delivered remarks on jobs and the economy.	President Trump in MN (50240082458)
Wisconsin	Oshkosh	August 17	President Trump delivered remarks on "Jobs and the Economy" at Wittman Regional Airport.	
Iowa	Cedar Rapids	August 18	Arriving via The Eastern Iowa Airport, President Trump participated in an Iowa Disaster Recovery Briefing.	President Trump in IA (50241590106)
Arizona	Yuma	August 18	Arriving via Yuma International Airport, President Trump received an update on the US–Mexico border wall. President then also delivered remarks on "Immigration and Border Security" at Yuma International Airport.	
Pennsylvania	Old Forge	August 20	Arriving via Wilkes-Barre/Scranton International Airport, President Trump held a Keep America Great Rally at Mariotti Building Products. While returning to the airport, the President stopped at the Arcaro & Genell pizza restaurant.	
Virginia	Arlington County	August 21	President Trump delivered remarks at the 2020 Council for National Policy Meeting at the Ritz-Carlton Pentagon City.	
Virginia	Sterling	August 22	President Trump played golf at Trump National D.C.	
Virginia	Sterling	August 23	President Trump played golf at Trump National D.C.	
North Carolina	Charlotte, Mills River	August 24	Arriving via Charlotte Douglas International Airport, President Trump spoke at the 2020 Republican National Convention at the Charlotte Convention Center and formally accepted the 2020 Republican Nomination. He then flew on Marine One to Asheville Regional Airport, toured the Flavor First Growers and Packers facility and delivered remarks on the Farmers to Families Food Box Program. He then returned to Washington via Greenville–Spartanburg International Airport. This visit was concurrent with the first day of the 2020 Republican National Convention, which partially took place in Charlotte.	
Maryland	Baltimore	August 26	Flying on Marine One from Fort Lesley J. McNair, President Trump and First Lady Melania Trump visited Fort McHenry for Vice President Mike Pence's speech accepting the Republican Party vice presidential nomination at the 2020 Republican National Convention.	
New Hampshire	Londonderry	August 28	President Trump held a Keep America Great Rally at Manchester–Boston Regional Airport.	
Louisiana	Lake Charles	August 29	Arriving via Chennault International Airport, President Trump visited the areas affected by Hurricane Laura. Trump began by visiting a warehouse used by the Cajun Navy. Governor John Bel Edwards lead Trump on a tour to survey some of the damage in downtown Lake Charles. He then walked to Fire Company One, located at the Lake Charles Fire House, to meet with individuals involved in the response to the Hurricane. Trump quickly greeted members of the 3rd Battalion of the 156th Infantry Division at an armory outside of Lake Charles Boston High School Cougar Stadium.	
Texas	Orange	August 29	Arriving on Marine One via Orange County Airport, President Trump met with officials at the emergency operations center in the Orange County Convention and Expo Center. He then returned to Washington via Lake Charles, Louisiana.	
Virginia	Sterling	August 30	President Trump played golf at Trump National D.C.	

== September ==
Country/ U.S. state	Areas visited	Dates	Details	Image
Wisconsin	Kenosha	September 1	Arriving via Waukegan National Airport, President Trump visited and meet with law enforcement and survey damage from recent riots in wake of the shooting of Jacob Blake, delivering remarks at B&L Office Furniture Inc. and meeting with affected individuals outside of Rode's Camera Shop. He visited the Emergency Operations Center at Mary D. Bradford High School, and participated in a round-table on Wisconsin Community Safety.	
North Carolina	Wilmington	September 2	Arriving at Wilmington International Airport, President Trump delivered remarks at the airport. He commemorated the 75th Anniversary of the end of World War II at the battleship USS North Carolina. He also designated Wilmington as the first American World War II Heritage City.	
Pennsylvania	Latrobe	September 3	President Trump held a Keep America Great Rally at Arnold Palmer Regional Airport.	
Virginia	Sterling	September 5	President Trump played golf at Trump National D.C.	
Virginia	Sterling	September 6	President Trump played golf at Trump National D.C.	
Florida	Jupiter	September 8	Arriving via Palm Beach International Airport, President Trump visited Jupiter Inlet Lighthouse & Museum. He delivered remarks on Environmental Accomplishments for the People of Florida, to discuss Everglades restoration.	
North Carolina	Winston-Salem	September 8	President Trump held a Keep America Great Rally at Smith Reynolds Airport.	
Michigan	Freeland	September 10	President Trump held a Keep America Great Rally at MBS International Airport.	
Pennsylvania	Shanksville	September 11	Arriving via Johnstown–Cambria County Airport, President Trump and First Lady Melania Trump flew to the Flight 93 National Memorial on Marine One, and participated in a memorial service honoring the victims of United Airlines Flight 93 which crashed into a field in Somerset County on September 11, 2001.	
Nevada	Minden, Las Vegas, Henderson	September 12–14	Arriving via Reno-Tahoe International Airport, President Trump drove to Minden–Tahoe Airport and held a "Great American Comeback Event" at the airport. He then flew to McCarran International Airport, and spent the night at the Trump International Hotel Las Vegas. On September 13, President Trump held a "Latinos for Trump Roundtable" and participated in a roundtable with supporters at Treasure Island Hotel and Casino. President Trump also participated in a roundtable with supporters and also held a "Great American Comeback Event" at Xtreme Manufacturing. He returned to Las Vegas to again spend the night at the Trump International Hotel Las Vegas.	
California	McClellan Park	September 14	Arriving via Sacramento McClellan Airport, President Trump visited the areas affected by California wildfires. He delivered remarks and participated in a Ceremony Recognizing the California National Guard.	
Arizona	Phoenix	September 14	Arriving via Phoenix Sky Harbor International Airport, President Trump held a "Latinos for Trump Roundtable" at the Arizona Grand Resort.	
Pennsylvania	Philadelphia	September 15	Arriving via Philadelphia International Airport, President Trump participated in an ABC Town Hall at the National Constitution Center.	
Wisconsin	Mosinee	September 17	President Trump held a "Great American Comeback Event" at Central Wisconsin Airport.	
Minnesota	Bemidji	September 18	President Trump held a "Great American Comeback Event" at Bemidji Regional Airport.	
North Carolina	Fayetteville	September 19	President Trump held a "Great American Comeback Event" at Fayetteville Regional Airport.	
Virginia	Sterling	September 20	President Trump played golf at Trump National D.C.	
Ohio	Vandalia, Swanton	September 21	President Trump delivered remarks on "Fighting for the American Worker" at Dayton International Airport. President Trump held a "Great American Comeback Event" at Toledo Express Airport.	
Pennsylvania	Moon Township	September 22	President Trump held a "Great American Comeback Event" at Pittsburgh International Airport.	
North Carolina	Charlotte	September 24	Arriving via Charlotte Douglas International Airport, President Trump delivered remarks on the America First Healthcare Vision.	
Florida	Jacksonville, Doral	September 24–25	President Trump held a "Great American Comeback Event" at Cecil Airport. He then flew to Miami International Airport, and spent the night at the Trump National Doral Miami. On September 25, President Trump participated in a "Latinos for Trump" Roundtable discussion.	
Georgia	Atlanta	September 25	Arriving via Dobbins Air Reserve Base, President Trump delivered remarks on "Black Economic Empowerment: The Platinum Plan" at Cobb Galleria Centre.	
Virginia	Newport News	September 25	President Trump held a "Make America Great Again Event" at Newport News/Williamsburg International Airport.	
Pennsylvania	Middletown	September 26	President Trump held a "Great American Comeback Event" Harrisburg International Airport.	
Virginia	Sterling	September 27	President Trump played golf at Trump National D.C.	
Ohio	Cleveland	September 29	Arriving via Cleveland Hopkins International Airport, President Trump participated in the first presidential debate at Case Western Reserve University, along with Democratic nominee Joe Biden.	
Minnesota	Shorewood, Duluth	September 30	Arriving via Minneapolis-Saint Paul International Airport, President Trump traveled to Shorewood to participate in a Fundraising Committee Reception at the private home of Martin Davis, a prominent Republican donor. He then flew to Duluth and held a "Make American Great Again Event" at Duluth International Airport.	

== October ==
Country/ U.S. state	Areas visited	Dates	Details	Image
New Jersey	Bedminster	October 1	Arriving via Morristown Municipal Airport and flying to Bedminster on Marine One, President Trump participated in a roundtable with supporters and delivered remarks at a fundraising committee reception at Trump National Golf Club.	
Maryland	Bethesda	October 2–5	President Trump traveled to Walter Reed National Military Medical Center for treatment for Coronavirus disease 2019. Trump was driven around the hospital on October 4. He was released by his doctors back to the White House on Monday afternoon.	
Florida	Sanford	October 12	President Trump held a "Make America Great Again Event" at Orlando Sanford International Airport.	
Pennsylvania	Johnstown	October 13	President Trump held a "Make America Great Again Event" at John Murtha Johnstown-Cambria County Airport.	
Iowa	Des Moines	October 14	President Trump held a "Make America Great Again Event" at Des Moines International Airport.	
North Carolina	Greenville	October 15	President Trump held a "Make America Great Again Event" at Pitt–Greenville Airport.	
Florida	Doral, Miami, Fort Myers, Ocala	October 15–16	Arriving via Miami International Airport, President Trump delivered remarks at a Fundraising Committee Reception at Trump National Doral Miami. President Trump participated in an NBC News town hall at Pérez Art Museum Miami. He spent the night at the Trump National Doral Miami. On October 16, arriving via Southwest Florida International Airport, President Trump delivered remarks on Protecting America's Seniors at Caloosa Sound Convention Center & Amphitheater. He then flew to Ocala and held a "Make America Great Again Event" at Ocala International Airport.	
Georgia	Macon	October 16	President Trump held a "Make America Great Again Event" at Middle Georgia Regional Airport.	
Michigan	Muskegon	October 17	President Trump delivered remarks on "Supporting the American Way of Life" at Muskegon County Airport.	
Wisconsin	Janesville	October 17	President Trump delivered remarks on "Supporting Law Enforcement" at Southern Wisconsin Regional Airport.	
Nevada	Las Vegas	October 17–18	Arriving via McCarran International Airport, President Trump spent the night at the Trump International Hotel Las Vegas. On October 18, President Trump attended the International Church of Las Vegas Service.	
California	Newport Beach	October 18	Arriving via John Wayne Airport, President Trump participated in a roundtable with supporters and delivered remarks at a fundraising committee reception at the private residence of Palmer Luckey, who designed the Oculus Rift.	
Nevada	Carson City, Las Vegas	October 18–19	Arriving via Reno-Tahoe International Airport, President Trump traveled to Carson City to held a "Make America Great Again Event" at Carson City Airport. President Trump returned to Las Vegas to again spent the night at the Trump International Hotel Las Vegas.	
Arizona	Prescott, Tucson	October 19	Arriving via Phoenix Sky Harbor International Airport, President Trump flew to Prescott on Marine One where he held a "Make America Great Again Event" at Prescott Regional Airport. He then flew to Tucson where he also held a "Make America Great Again Event" at Tucson International Airport.	
Pennsylvania	Erie	October 20	President Trump held a "Make America Great Again Event" at Erie International Airport.	
North Carolina	Gastonia	October 21	Arriving via Charlotte Douglas International Airport, President Trump held a "Make America Great Again Event" at Gastonia Municipal Airport.	
Tennessee	Nashville	October 22	Arriving via Nashville International Airport, President Trump participated in a roundtable with supporters at JW Marriott Nashville. President Trump participated in the final presidential debate at Belmont University, along with Democratic nominee Joe Biden.	
Florida	The Villages, Pensacola, Mar-a-Lago, West Palm Beach	October 23–24	Arriving via Ocala International Airport, President Trump flew to The Villages Polo Club on Marine One, where he held a "Make America Great Again Victory Event". President Trump then flew to Pensacola also held a "Make America Great Again Victory Event" at Pensacola International Airport. Arriving via Palm Beach International Airport, President Trump spent the night at Mar-a-Lago. On October 24, President Trump casts his ballot by early voting at Palm Beach County Main Library.	
North Carolina	Lumberton	October 24	Arriving via Fayetteville Regional Airport, President Trump delivered remarks on "Fighting for the forgotten Men and Women" at Robeson County Fairgrounds.	
Ohio	Circleville	October 24	Arriving via Rickenbacker International Airport, President Trump held a "Make America Great Again Victory Event" at Pickaway Agriculture and Event Center.	
Wisconsin	Waukesha	October 24	Arriving via Milwaukee Mitchell International Airport, President Trump held a "Make America Great Again Victory Event" at Waukesha County Airport.	
New Hampshire	Manchester	October 25	President Trump held a "Make America Great Again Victory Event" at Manchester–Boston Regional Airport.	
Maine	Levant	October 25	Arriving via Bangor International Airport, President Trump visited Treworgy Family Orchards.	
Pennsylvania	Allentown, Lititz, Martinsburg	October 26	Arriving via Lehigh Valley International Airport, President Trump delivered remarks to American workers at HoverTech International. President Trump flew to Lititz to held a "Make America Great Again Victory Event" at Lancaster Airport. Then arriving via Johnstown–Cambria County Airport, President Trump traveling to Altoona–Blair County Airport on Marine One, where he also held a "Make America Great Again Victory Event".	
Michigan	Lansing	October 27	President Trump held a "Make America Great Again Victory Event" at Capital Region International Airport.	
Wisconsin	West Salem	October 27	Arriving via La Crosse Regional Airport, President Trump held a "Make America Great Again Victory Event" at La Crosse Fairgrounds Speedway.	
Nebraska	Omaha	October 27	President Trump held a "Make America Great Again Victory Event" at Eppley Airfield.	
Nevada	Las Vegas	October 27–28	Arriving via McCarran International Airport, President Trump spent the night at the Trump International Hotel Las Vegas.	
Arizona	Bullhead City, Goodyear	October 28	President Trump held a "Make America Great Again Victory Event" at Laughlin/Bullhead International Airport. President Trump flew to Goodyear where he also held a "Make America Great Again Victory Event" at Phoenix Goodyear Airport.	
Florida	Doral, Tampa	October 28–29	Arriving via Miami International Airport, President Trump spent the night at the Trump National Doral Miami. On October 29, arriving via Tampa International Airport, President Trump and First Lady Melania Trump held a "Make America Great Again Victory Event" at Raymond James Stadium.	
North Carolina	Fort Bragg	October 29	Arriving via Pope Army Field, President Trump traveled to Fort Bragg, where he presented a Presidential Unit Citation and visited The Special Warfare Memorial Statue.	
Michigan	Waterford Township	October 30	President Trump held a "Make America Great Again Victory Event" at Oakland County International Airport.	
Wisconsin	Green Bay	October 30	President Trump held a "Make America Great Again Victory Event" at Green Bay–Austin Straubel International Airport.	
Minnesota	Rochester	October 30	President Trump held a "Make America Great Again Peaceful Protest" at Rochester International Airport.	
Pennsylvania	Newtown, Reading, Butler, Montoursville	October 31	Arriving via Trenton-Mercer Airport, President Trump held a "Make America Great Again, Again" rally at The Keith House. President Trump flew to Reading, where he held a "Make America Great Again Victory Event" at Reading Regional Airport. Then arriving via Pittsburgh International Airport, President Trump traveled to Pittsburgh-Butler Regional Airport on Marine One, where he also held a "Make America Great Again Victory Event". President Trump flew to Montoursville, where he also held a "Make America Great Again Victory Event" at Williamsport Regional Airport.	

== November ==
Country/ U.S. state	Areas visited	Dates	Details	Image
Michigan	Washington	November 1	Arriving via Oakland County International Airport, President Trump held a "Make America Great Again Victory Event" at Michigan Stars Sports Center.	
Iowa	Dubuque	November 1	President Trump held a "Make America Great Again Victory Event" at Dubuque Regional Airport.	
North Carolina	Hickory	November 1	Arriving via Charlotte Douglas International Airport, President Trump traveling to Hickory Regional Airport on Marine One, where he held a "Make America Great Again Victory Event".	
(Georgia (U.S. state)) Georgia	Rome	November 1	President Trump held a "Make America Great Again Victory Event" at Richard B. Russell Airport.	
Florida	Opa-locka, Doral	November 1–2	President Trump held a "Make America Great Again Victory Event" at Miami-Opa Locka Executive Airport. President Trump spent the night at the Trump National Doral Miami.	
North Carolina	Fayetteville	November 2	President Trump held a "Make America Great Again Victory Event" at Fayetteville Regional Airport.	
Pennsylvania	Scranton	November 2	President Trump held a "Make America Great Again Victory Event" at Wilkes-Barre Scranton International Airport.	
Michigan	Traverse City	November 2	President Trump held a "Make America Great Again Victory Event" at Cherry Capital Airport.	
Wisconsin	Kenosha	November 2	Arriving via Milwaukee Mitchell International Airport, President Trump held a "Make America Great Again Victory Event" at Kenosha Regional Airport.	
Michigan	Grand Rapids	November 2–3	President Trump held a "Make America Great Again Victory Event" at Gerald R. Ford International Airport.	
Virginia	Rosslyn	November 3	President Trump visited the Republican National Committee Annex offices on Election Day.	
Virginia	Sterling	November 7	President Trump played golf at Trump National D.C.	
Virginia	Sterling	November 8	President Trump played golf at Trump National D.C.	
Virginia	Arlington	November 11	President Trump and First Lady Melania Trump traveled to Arlington National Cemetery for Veterans Day, where he participated in a wreath-laying ceremony at the Tomb of the Unknown Soldier.	
Virginia	Sterling	November 14	After passing by the Willard InterContinental Washington and doing a circuit of Freedom Plaza, President Trump played golf at Trump National D.C.	
Virginia	Sterling	November 15	President Trump visited the Trump National D.C., where he played golf.	
Virginia	Sterling	November 21	President Trump visited the Trump National D.C., where he played golf.	
Virginia	Sterling	November 22	President Trump visited the Trump National D.C., where he played golf.	
Virginia	Sterling	November 26	President Trump visited the Trump National D.C., where he played golf.	
Virginia	Sterling	November 27	President Trump visited the Trump National D.C., where he played golf.	
Virginia	Sterling	November 28	Arriving from Camp David, President Trump visited the Trump National D.C., where he played golf.	

== December ==
Country/ U.S. state	Areas visited	Dates	Details	Image
(Georgia (U.S. state)) Georgia	Valdosta	December 5	President Trump and First Lady Melania Trump held a "Victory Rally" in support of United States Senators David Perdue and Kelly Loeffler and their runoff election campaigns at Valdosta Regional Airport.	
(New York (state)) New York	West Point	December 12	Arriving via Stewart International Airport in New Windsor, NY, President Trump attended the 121st Army-Navy game at Michie Stadium on the campus of the United States Military Academy.	
Virginia	Sterling	December 13	President Trump visited the Trump National D.C., where he played golf.	
Florida	Mar-a-Lago, West Palm Beach	December 23–31	Arriving via Palm Beach International Airport, President Trump and First Lady Melania Trump spend their Christmas Holiday at his resort in Mar-a-Lago. On Christmas Eve, Christmas Day, and December 27–30, President Trump played golf at Trump International Golf Club.	

== January 2021 ==
Country/ U.S. state	Areas visited	Dates	Details	Image
(Georgia (U.S. state)) Georgia	Dalton	January 4	Arriving via Dobbins Air Reserve Base and flying to Dalton on Marine One, President Trump held a "Victory Rally" in support of United States Senators David Perdue and Kelly Loeffler and their runoff election campaigns at Dalton Municipal Airport.	
Texas	Alamo	January 12	Arriving via Valley International Airport and flying on Marine One to McAllen International Airport, President Trump visited sections of the US–Mexico border wall in Alamo.	
Maryland	Prince George's County	January 20	President Trump and First Lady Melania Trump delivered the farewell send-off at Joint Base Andrews, before heading to Mar-a-Lago.	
Florida	Mar-a-Lago	January 20	Arriving via Palm Beach International Airport, President Trump travelled to his Florida country club to complete his first term, becoming the first president since Andrew Johnson in 1869 not to attend his elected successor's inauguration.	

== See also ==
- List of international presidential trips made by Donald Trump
- List of Donald Trump rallies (December 2016–2022)
- Lists of presidential trips made by Donald Trump
