= Ocala International Airport =

Airport in Florida, U.S.

Ocala International Airport Jim Taylor Field
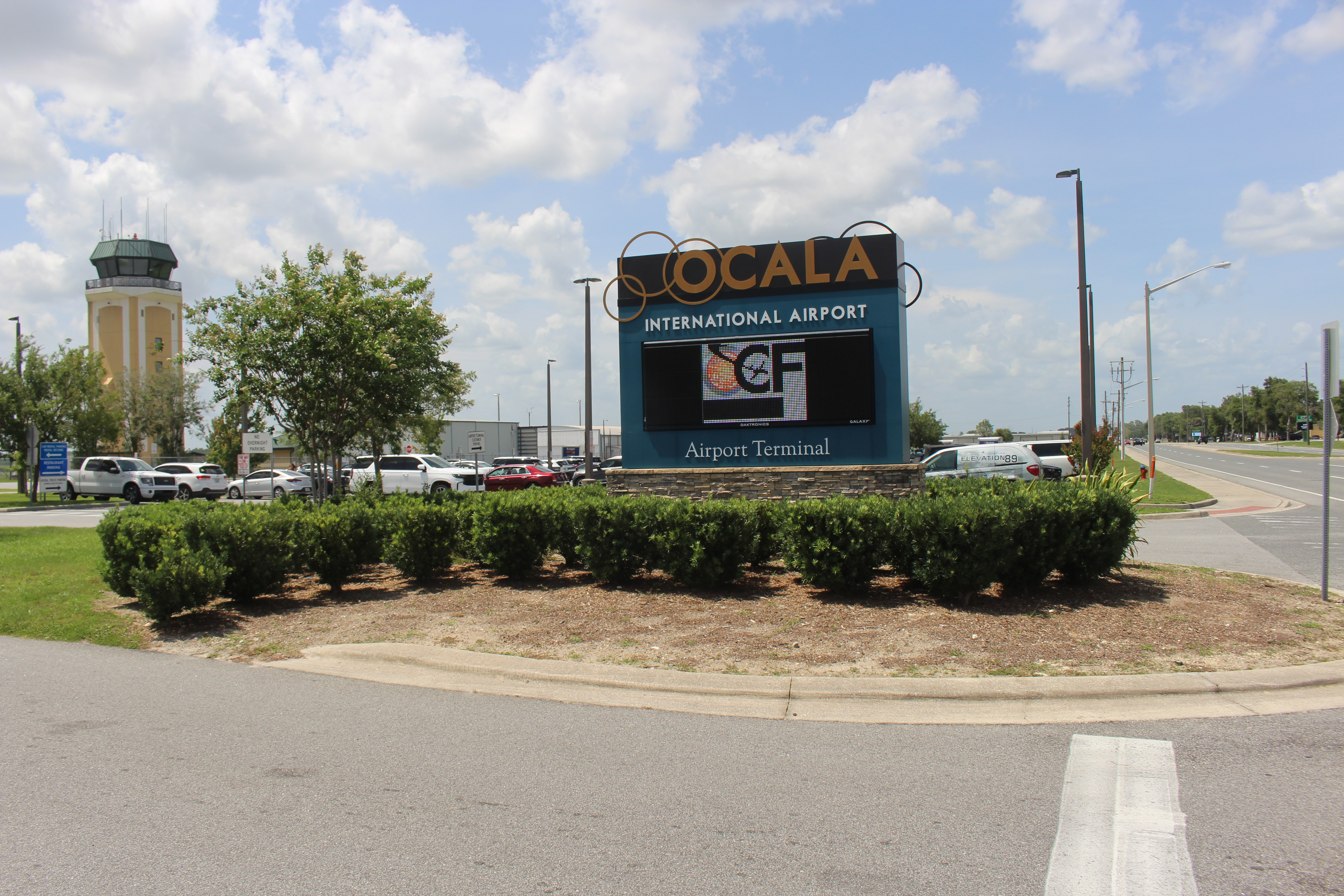
- Sign for the terminal at the airport in June 2025
- IATA: OCF; ICAO: KOCF; FAA LID: OCF

Summary
- Airport type: Public
- Owner: City of Ocala
- Serves: Ocala, Florida
- Elevation AMSL: 90 ft / 27 m
- Coordinates: 29°10′18″N 082°13′27″W
- Website: OcalaAirport.com

Map
- Location of airport in Florida OCF (the United States)

Runways
Direction	Length		Surface
Direction	ft	m	Surface
18/36	7,467	2,276	Asphalt
8/26	3,009	917	Asphalt

Statistics (2022)
- Aircraft operations: 58,465 (for year ending 10/31/2022
- Based aircraft: 146
- Source: Federal Aviation Administration

Ocala International Airport (IATA: OCF, ICAO: KOCF, FAA LID: OCF) is five miles west of Ocala, in Marion County, Florida, United States. It is also known as Ocala International Airport-Jim Taylor Field and was previously Ocala Regional Airport or Jim Taylor Field. Despite its name, commercial airlines do not fly to Ocala International Airport.

The airport is about 31 miles south of Gainesville Regional Airport.

== History ==
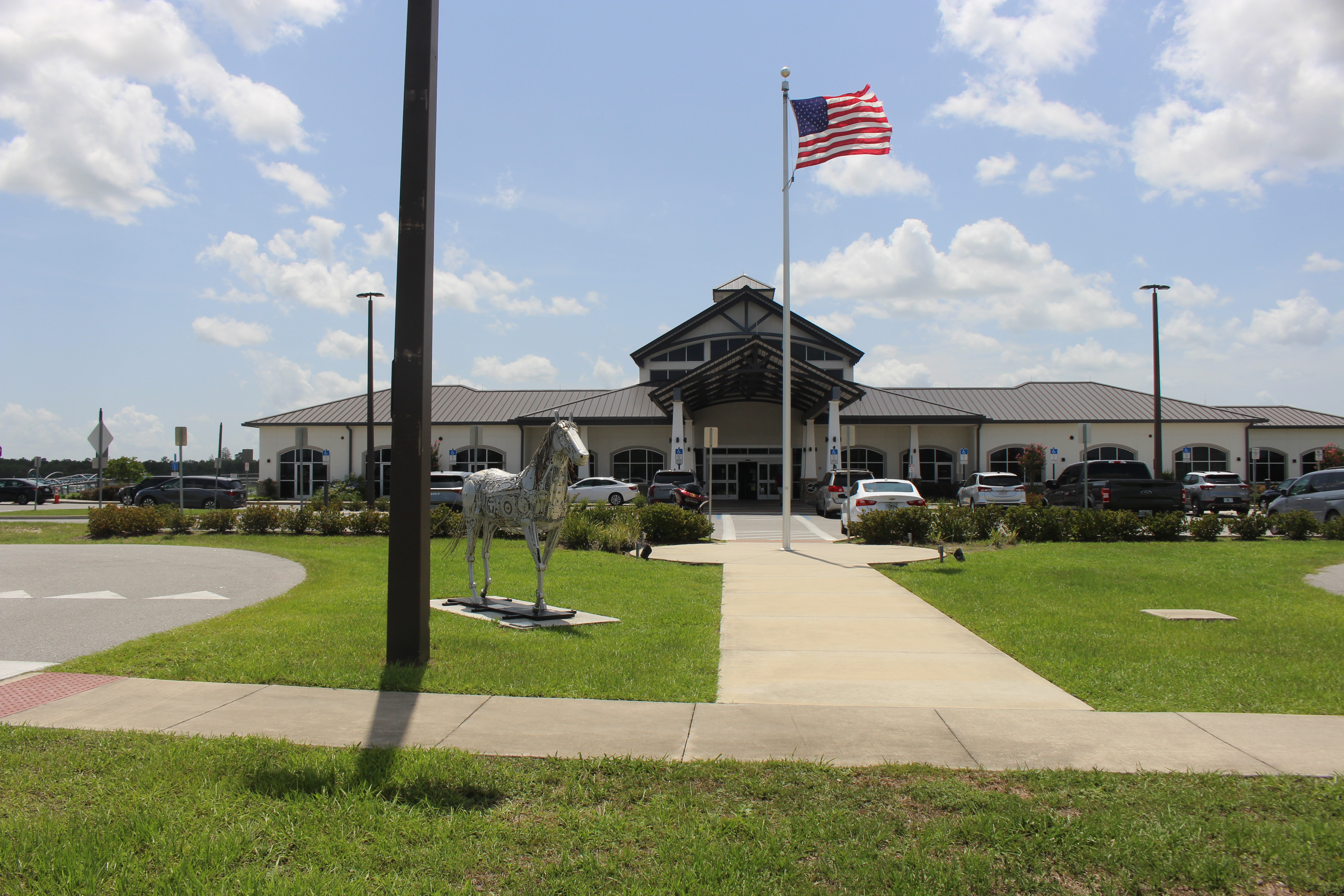
Terminal Building

The airport opened in the early 1960s, replacing the previous Taylor Field just southwest of Ocala. Its 5000-ft runway was served by Eastern Airlines, with one Convair 440 flight a day with a routing of Jacksonville (JAX) - Gainesville (GNV) - Ocala (OCF) - Vero Beach (VRB) - Miami (MIA) and return. Eastern later operated Lockheed L-188 Electra turboprop service with the last Electra flight leaving Ocala in 1972.

Later scheduled passenger airline service included:

- Air Florida – Boeing 737, Boeing 727 and Douglas DC-9 jet service to Miami, Tampa, Orlando, Jacksonville and Gainesville
- USAir Express (operated by Allegheny Commuter) – Beechcraft turboprops to Orlando
- Skyway Commuter – Beechcraft turboprops and Piper prop service to Gainesville and Orlando

The last airline flight left Ocala in 1987 when USAir Express pulled out. Airport facilities were then expanded to include a 3,000-foot crosswind runway, an extension of the main runway to 6,900 feet, an instrument landing approach, and FAA Part 139 certification. Scheduled passenger airline service is unlikely to return to Ocala.

In 2004 a $1.3 million plan was put in motion to upgrade the apron security system.

== Facilities and aircraft ==
=== Facilities ===
Ocala International Airport covers 1,532 acres (620 ha) at an elevation of 90 feet (27 m). It has two asphalt runways: runway 18/36 is 7,467 by 150 feet (2,276 x 46 m) and runway 8/26 is 3,009 by 50 feet (917 x 15 m).

In May 2009 construction began on an air traffic control tower. The tower was certified and staffed as an FAA Level I contract control tower in summer 2010. A new terminal building was completed in the spring of 2020.

Current facilities on site include:

- Avis Car Rental
- Elevation 89 Restaurant
- Enterprise Car Rental
- Epic Flight Academy
- Ocala Aviation
- Sheltair Aviation
- PRP AVIATION

=== Aircraft ===
For the year ending October 31, 2022, the airport had 58,465 aircraft operations, average 160 per day: 95% general aviation, 3% air taxi, 1% military, and <1% commercial. 146 aircraft were then based at the airport: 101 single-engine and 20 multi-engine airplanes, 15 jet, 9 helicopter, and 1 glider.

== In popular culture ==
In 2012, John Travolta and Olivia Newton-John released a Christmas album containing the track "I Think You Might Like It", whose music video features the FBO at the airport. Travolta lives nearby, at the Jumbolair fly-in community, which also makes an appearance in the video.

== See also ==
- List of airports in Florida
