= Timeline of the first Trump presidency (2018 Q2) =

The following is a timeline of the first presidency of Donald Trump during the second quarter of 2018, from April 1 to June 30, 2018. For a complete itinerary of his travels, see List of presidential trips made by Donald Trump (2018). To navigate between quarters, see timeline of the Donald Trump presidencies. For the Q3 timeline see timeline of the first Trump presidency (2018 Q3).

== Overview ==
=== Economy ===
More than 103,000 jobs were created in March as the unemployment rate remained stable into April. At the start of the quarter, the U.S. stock market experienced daily sell-offs and recoveries due to a burgeoning U.S.–China trade war and increased political scrutiny of American business icons Amazon and Facebook. In May, the U.S. Labor Department reported a seasonally adjusted unemployment rate of 3.9% for April and an increase of 164,000 jobs. Wages grew by 2.6%. Hiring gains were broad based with jobs being added in the fields of professional and business services, health care, manufacturing, and mining.

=== Public opinion ===
According to FiveThirtyEight, President Trump's approval rate at the beginning of this quarter was 40.5%, down 4.9% from the start of his presidency. By May 1, it had improved to 41.2%. For more polls, see 2018 opinion polling on the Trump administration

== Timeline ==
=== April 2018 ===
Date	Events	Photos/videos
Sunday, April 1		
Monday, April 2	President Trump and First Lady Melania Trump participate in the White House Easter Egg Roll.; Kremlin foreign policy aide Yuri Ushakov claims Trump invited Russian president Vladimir Putin to the White House.	President Trump and First Lady Melania Trump host the White House Easter Egg Roll
Tuesday, April 3	President Trump holds a joint press conference with the leaders of three Baltic states at the White House: Estonian President Kersti Kaljulaid, Latvian President Raimonds Vejonis and Lithuanian President Dalia Grybauskaite.	President Trump and the leaders of three Baltic states
Wednesday, April 4	President Trump signs a proclamation directing the deployment of the National Guard to the U.S.–Mexico border to fight illegal immigration.; President Trump attends a campaign rally in White Sulfur Springs, West Virginia.	
Thursday, April 5		
Friday, April 6		
Saturday, April 7		
Sunday, April 8		
Monday, April 9	After the FBI and federal prosecutors raid the home, hotel room, and office of President Trump's personal attorney, Michael Cohen, Trump brands the raid as "an attack on our country in a true sense".; Regarding firing special counsel Robert Mueller, President Trump says, "Many people have said you should fire him", and "We'll see what happens".; President Trump meets with military leaders to discuss a response to poison gas attacks in Syria.	
Tuesday, April 10	The White House confirms the resignation of Homeland Security advisor Thomas Bossert and National Security Council spokesman Michael Anton.; President Trump holds a bilateral meeting with Emir Tamim bin Hamad Al Thani of Qatar at the White House.; President Trump hosts the NCAA football champion Alabama Crimson Tide on the south lawn of the White House.	
Wednesday, April 11	President Trump signs a bill that reduces legal protections for websites that enable sex trafficking.; Nadia Schadlow, deputy national security adviser for strategy, resigns effective April 27.; President Trump hires a new member for his legal team, Joanna Hendon, a partner at the New York firm Spears & Imes.	
Thursday, April 12	President Trump launches a task force to "conduct a thorough evaluation of the operations and finances of the United States Postal System".; President Trump tweets a warning that "an attack on Syria could be very soon or not soon at all!"	
Friday, April 13	President Trump pardons Scooter Libby, the former chief of staff for Vice President Dick Cheney in the George W. Bush administration. As a result of the Plame investigation into the leaking of an undercover CIA agent's identity, Libby had been found guilty of making false statements, obstruction of justice and lying under oath.; President Trump sends a series of tweets attacking James Comey, the fired FBI director, as a liar and a "slimeball" and suggests Comey should be in jail.; President Trump orders missile strikes against Syria in retaliation for the chemical weapons attack on April 7 and challenges Iran and Russia to decide if they will continue to support the Assad regime. President Trump in his address to the nation from the White House stated "A short time ago, I ordered the U.S. Armed Forces to launch precision strikes on targets associated with the chemical weapons capabilities of Syrian dictator, Bashar al-Assad, a combined operation with the armed forces of France and the United Kingdom is now under way."; President Trump says the United States may rejoin the Trans-Pacific Partnership.	President Trump announces missile strikes against Syria
Saturday, April 14		
Sunday, April 15		
Monday, April 16	President Trump's new lawyer, Joanna Hendon, a partner at New York's Spears & Imes law firm, represents him at a hearing concerning Michael Cohen.	
Tuesday, April 17	President Trump meets with Japanese Prime Minister Shinzō Abe for the first of two days of meetings and events to discuss trade, security, and Trump's expected meeting with North Korean leader Kim Jong-un this spring.; President Trump announces that CIA director Mike Pompeo had travelled to North Korea over the Easter Weekend and met with Kim Jong-un to discuss and plan for Trump's visit.; UN Ambassador Nikki Haley responds to a claim by White House economic adviser Larry Kudlow that she was confused when she announced a rollout of sanctions on Russia by commenting, "With all due respect, I don't get confused."	President Trump and Japanese Prime Minister Shinzō Abe
Wednesday, April 18	President Trump and Japanese prime minister Shinzō Abe conduct a joint news conference after their second day of meetings.	
Thursday, April 19	Rudy Giuliani, as well as Jane and Marty Raskin, join President Trump's legal team. The Raskins are married law partners based in Coral Gables, Florida.	
Saturday, April 21	President Trump uses Twitter to attack New York Times reporter Maggie Haberman following an article she wrote about his poor treatment of Michael Cohen and that Cohen may cooperate with prosecutors as a result.	
Sunday, April 22	President Trump tweets a claim that North Korea has agreed to denuclearize.	
Monday, April 23	French President Emmanuel Macron, accompanied by his spouse, begins a three-day state visit, the first during the Trump presidency.; The Senate foreign relations committee votes 11–9 in favor of Mike Pompeo's nomination for secretary of state.	President Trump and First Lady Melania Trump with French President Emmanuel Macron and First Lady Brigitte Macron
Tuesday, April 24	The Senate Committee on Veterans' Affairs announces a delay in the hearing for Trump veterans administration nominee Ronny Jackson.; President Trump holds a bilateral meeting and joint press conference with French president Emmanuel Macron at the White House.; President Trump and First Lady Melania Trump host their first state dinner in honor of French president Emmanuel Macron and his wife, Brigitte.	A Joint Press Conference with President Trump and French President Emmanuel Macron
Wednesday, April 25	French president Emmanuel Macron addresses a joint meeting of the members of Congress.; Bryan Rice, head of the Bureau of Indian Affairs, resigns.	
Thursday, April 26	Dr. Ronny Jackson withdraws his nomination to head the Department of Veterans Affairs.; The Senate confirms Mike Pompeo as the 70th U.S. Secretary of State in a vote of 57–42.; President Trump withholds some classified documents as NARA releases 19,045 more documents on the assassination of former President John F. Kennedy. They are to be released in 2021.	Secretary of State Mike Pompeo is sworn in
Friday, April 27	President Trump holds a bilateral meeting and joint press conference with German Chancellor Angela Merkel at the White House.	A Joint Press Conference with President Trump and German Chancellor Angela Merkel
Saturday, April 28		
Sunday, April 29		
Monday, April 30	Stormy Daniels files a defamation lawsuit against Trump for his "total con job" tweet about the forensic sketch of a man who allegedly threatened her in 2011.; President Trump holds a bilateral meeting and joint press conference with Nigerian President Muhammadu Buhari at the White House.; Thomas Homan, acting director of ICE, announces his retirement effective June 2018.	President Trump and Nigerian President Muhammadu Buhari

=== May 2018 ===
Date	Events	Photos/videos
Tuesday, May 1	President Trump presents the Commander-in-Chief's Trophy to the Army Black Knights football team for its victory over both Air Force and Navy last year.; During an interview with NBC News, Harold Bornstein, Donald Trump's longtime personal medical doctor for over 35 years, says Keith Schiller, director of Oval Office operations for the White House, another unnamed "large man", and Alan Garten, the Trump Organization's chief legal officer, had taken Donald Trump's medical records from Bornstein's office on February 3, 2017, without obtaining a Health Insurance Portability and Accountability Act (HIPAA) release statement signed by Donald Trump.	
Wednesday, May 2	President Trump announces plans to replace retiring White House lawyer Ty Cobb with former President Clinton's impeachment lawyer, Emmet Flood.	
Thursday, May 3	President Trump speaks at the National Day of Prayer service in the Rose Garden.	
Friday, May 4	Over the preceding week, four EPA officials have resigned: Albert "Kell" Kelly, the top Superfund advisor; Pasquale Perrotta, the head of Administrator Pruitt's security detail; Associate Administrator Liz Bowman; and today John Konkus, deputy Associate Administrator for public affairs.; The Trump administration ends temporary protected status for Hondurans, leaving potentially 57,000 people vulnerable to deportation.; President Trump and Vice President Pence speak at National Rifle Association of America's annual convention in Dallas, Texas.	
Saturday, May 5	President Trump attends a fundraiser for the RNC in Cleveland, Ohio.	
Sunday, May 6		
Monday, May 7	First Lady Melania Trump announces the launch of her Be Best anti-cyber bullying initiative.	First Lady Melania Trump announces her Be Best initiative
Tuesday, May 8	The White House denies a New York Times report that President Trump has privately told French president Emmanuel Macron the U.S. is withdrawing from the Iran nuclear deal.; President Trump announces in a speech that the U.S. will withdraw from the Obama-era Iran nuclear deal and reinstate sanctions.	President Trump announces the U.S. withdrawal from the Iran nuclear deal
Wednesday, May 9	R. Timothy Ziemer, the official on the National Security Council responsible for global health security and biodefense, is dismissed and his position is abolished.	
Thursday, May 10	President Trump welcomes three American detainees released from North Korea.; Homeland Security director Kirstjen Nielsen considers resigning after being berated by the president during a cabinet meeting.	President Trump and First Lady Melania Trump welcome three American detainees released from North Korea
Friday, May 11	Kelly Sadler, a White House official, mocks Senator John McCain, saying his opposition to Gina Haspel, Trump's nominee for CIA director, "doesn't matter, he's dying anyway".	
Saturday, May 12		
Sunday, May 13		
Monday, May 14	A report shows the Trump administration is concerned about chemically polluted water supplies near military installations.	
Tuesday, May 15	The Trump administration eliminates the White House's top cyber security policy role. Rob Joyce, the coordinator, is no longer at the White House.; UN Ambassador Nikki Haley walks out of UN Security Council as Palestinian Ambassador Riyad H. Mansour begins his remarks.	
Wednesday, May 16	President Trump submits a disclosure of personal finances which is required by the Office of Government Ethics. Trump acknowledges that Michael Cohen was paid between $100,000 and $250,000 in 2017.; President Trump meets with Uzbekistani President Shavkat Mirziyoyev at the White House.	
Thursday, May 17	Gina Haspel is confirmed by the Senate as the first female CIA director.; President Trump meets with NATO Secretary General Jens Stoltenberg at the White House.	President Trump and NATO Secretary General Jens Stoltenberg
Friday, May 18	President Trump announces the nomination of acting VA secretary Robert Wilkie to head the agency. At the same White House event he expressed his "sadness and heartbreak" over the Santa Fe school shooting.; First Lady Melania Trump is released from Walter Reed National Military Medical Center after a five-day stay for kidney surgery.; Mark Inch, the director of Federal Prisons, resigns.	
Saturday, May 19		
Sunday, May 20		
Monday, May 21	President Trump requests the Justice Department investigate whether his campaign was "infiltrated" by the FBI. The inspector general will review the FBI's counterintelligence investigation of the 2016 Trump campaign.; Treasury secretary Steve Mnuchin announces the administration will not implement its planned tariffs on China.	
Tuesday, May 22	President Trump holds a bilateral meeting with South Korean President Moon Jae-in at the White House to discuss the denuclearization of North Korea.; Reporters from CNN and The Associated Press are denied entry and forcibly removed from the PFAS National Leadership Summit event at the EPA where Scott Pruitt was to speak.; President Trump signs the Securely Expediting Clearances Through Reporting Transparency Act of 2018.	President Trump and South Korean President Moon Jae-in
Wednesday, May 23		
Thursday, May 24	President Trump posthumously pardons heavyweight boxing champ Jack Johnson.; President Trump cancels the proposed June nuclear summit with North Korea via a letter to Kim Jong-un.; The Economic Growth, Regulatory Relief, and Consumer Protection Act (Pub. L. 115–174 (text) (PDF), S. 2155) was signed into United States federal law by President Donald Trump on May 24, 2018.	
Friday, May 25	President Trump delivers the commencement address at the U.S. Naval Academy in Annapolis, Maryland.	President Trump delivers the commencement address
Saturday, May 26		
Sunday, May 27		
Monday, May 28	President Trump performs a wreath-laying ceremony at the Tomb of the Unknown Soldier at the Arlington National Cemetery and gives a speech honoring those who have died fighting for the U.S.	President Trump delivers the Memorial Day address at Arlington National Cemetery
Tuesday, May 29		
Wednesday, May 30		
Thursday, May 31		

=== June 2018 ===
Date	Events	Photos/videos
Friday, June 1	President Trump announces that the North Korea–United States summit would resume as scheduled for June 12 in Singapore after he met North Korean general Kim Yong-chol at the White House.	North Korean general Kim Yong-chol delivers a personal letter from Kim Jong Un to President Trump
Saturday, June 2		
Sunday, June 3		
Monday, June 4		
Tuesday, June 5		
Wednesday, June 6	Raj Shah announces via email that Kelly Sadler, a member of the White House communications staff, is "... no longer employed within the Executive Office of the President".	
Thursday, June 7	President Trump holds a bilateral meeting and joint press conference with Japanese prime minister Shinzō Abe at the White House.	A Joint Press Conference with President Trump and Japanese Prime Minister Shinzō Abe
Friday, June 8	President Trump attends the 44th G7 summit with world leaders of G7 in La Malbaie, Canada.; President Trump holds bilateral meetings with Canadian prime minister Justin Trudeau and French president Emmanuel Macron.	G7 leaders at the 44th G7 summit
Saturday, June 9	After President Trump leaves the 44th G7 summit early, he withdraws the United States' endorsement of a joint communique by the G7, and labels Canadian prime minister Justin Trudeau "Very dishonest & meek".; President Trump also addresses Trudeau by saying the Trump tariffs targeting Canada "are in response to his of 270% on dairy!" In the tweet, Trump did not cite national security, the legal basis for implementing the tariff.	
Sunday, June 10	Trade adviser Peter Navarro says there is "a special place in hell for" Canadian prime minister Justin Trudeau for having employed "bad faith diplomacy with President Donald J. Trump and then tries to stab him in the back on the way out the door ... that comes right from Air Force One."; Politico reports that Trump frequently and routinely would tear up papers he received, resulting in government officials' taping them together for archiving to ensure he had not violated the Presidential Records Act.	
Monday, June 11	President Trump holds a bilateral meeting with Singaporean prime minister Lee Hsien Loong in the Istana Palace.	President Trump and Singaporean Prime Minister Lee Hsien Loong
Tuesday, June 12	President Trump and North Korean Leader Kim Jong Un participate in a summit at the Capella Hotel in Sentosa, Singapore.; President Trump and North Korean Leader Kim Jong Un sign a joint declaration titled "Joint Statement of President Donald J. Trump of the United States of America and Chairman Kim Jong Un of the Democratic People's Republic of Korea at the Singapore Summit".	President Trump and North Korean Leader Kim Jong Un President Trump during the press conference after the summit
Wednesday, June 13		
Thursday, June 14		
Friday, June 15	The Department of Homeland Security states that between April 19 and May 31, 2018, there were 1,995 migrant children separated at the Mexico–United States border from 1,940 adults who are being held for criminal prosecution for an illegal border crossing.; President Trump says in response to the situation: "I hate to see separation of parents and children ... I hate the children being taken away." Trump then falsely blames the Democrats for the situation when it was the Trump administration's own "zero tolerance" policy announced on April 6, 2018, which is responsible for spurring the separations. He also says he "certainly wouldn't sign the more moderate" immigration bill proposed by House leaders with input from moderate Republicans and the White House.; The Washington Post quotes a White House official as saying that Trump's decision to enforce the current immigration law is "force people to the table" to negotiate on laws in Congress. Meanwhile, Trump tweets: "Any Immigration Bill MUST HAVE full funding for the Wall, end Catch & Release, Visa Lottery and Chain, and go to Merit Based Immigration."; In June 2018, Trump falsely claims that a report by Justice Department Inspector General Michael E. Horowitz "totally exonerates" him, despite the report's having nothing to do with the 2017 special counsel investigation, the Trump campaign or Russia. (The report was instead focused on the FBI's 2016 investigation of the Hillary Clinton email controversy.)	
Saturday, June 16		
Sunday, June 17		
Monday, June 18		
Tuesday, June 19	President Trump meets with King Felipe VI and Queen Letizia of Spain at the White House.	President Trump and King Felipe VI of Spain
Wednesday, June 20		
Thursday, June 21		
Friday, June 22		
Saturday, June 23		
Sunday, June 24		
Monday, June 25	President Trump holds a bilateral meeting with King Abdullah II of Jordan at the White House.	President Trump and King Abdullah II of Jordan
Tuesday, June 26		
Wednesday, June 27	President Trump holds a bilateral meeting with Portuguese President Marcelo Rebelo de Sousa at the White House.; Senior Supreme Court Justice Anthony Kennedy announces his retirement from the Supreme Court, effective July 31, 2018.	President Trump and Portuguese President Marcelo Rebelo de Sousa
Thursday, June 28		
Friday, June 29		
Saturday, June 30		

== See also ==
- First 100 days of the first Trump presidency – Period from January to April 2017
- List of executive actions by Donald Trump
- Lists of presidential trips made by Donald Trump (international trips)
- First presidential transition of Donald Trump – Transfer of presidential power from Barack Obama to Donald Trump
- Timeline of the 2016 United States presidential election

U.S. presidential administration timelines
Preceded by First Trump presidency (2018 Q1)	First Trump presidency (2018 Q2)	Succeeded by First Trump presidency (2018 Q3)
