= Timeline of the first Trump presidency (2018 Q1) =

The following is a timeline of the first presidency of Donald Trump during the first quarter of 2018, from January 1 to March 31, 2018. For a complete itinerary of his travels, see List of presidential trips made by Donald Trump (2018). To navigate between quarters, see timeline of the Donald Trump presidencies. For the Q2 timeline see timeline of the first Trump presidency (2018 Q2).

== Overview ==
=== Public opinion ===
According to FiveThirtyEight, President Trump's approval rate at the end of March was 40.5%, up 2% from the previous quarter and down 4.9% from the start of his presidency. For more polls, see 2018 opinion polling on the Donald Trump administration.

== Timeline ==
=== January 2018 ===
Date	Events	Photos/videos
Monday, January 1	Donald Trump begins his first full calendar year as President.; The Trump administration announces it will withhold the scheduled millions of military aid to Pakistan with President Trump declaring it a terrorist "safe haven".; Nick Ayers announces that Vice President Mike Pence's chief lawyer, Mark Paoletta, and domestic policy director, Daris Meeks, are to resign.	
Tuesday, January 2	President Trump tweets that his "nuclear button" is larger and more powerful than that of Kim Jong-un.; On Twitter, President Trump refers to the Department of Justice as the 'deep state' and then calls on it to investigate former FBI director James Comey and Hillary Clinton's top aide, Huma Abedin.; Via Twitter, President Trump threatens to cut off U.S. aid to the Palestinian Authority, claiming the Palestinians were no longer willing to negotiate on a peace process with the Israelis—seemingly after his December 2017 decision to recognize Jerusalem as the capital of Israel.	
Wednesday, January 3	President Trump disbands his Presidential Advisory Commission on Election Integrity.; President Trump issues a statement describing Steve Bannon, former CEO of the Trump campaign, as having "very little to do with our historic victory" and as having "lost his mind", following the publication of excerpts from a forthcoming book by Michael Wolff in which Bannon is said to describe Donald Trump Jr., Paul Manafort and Jared Kushner's meeting with Natalia Veselnitskaya as "treasonous" and "unpatriotic". Wolff's book also describes Bannon's confidence that Trump Sr. knew of the meeting at the time.	
Thursday, January 4	President Trump's lawyer Charles J. Harder sends to Michael Wolff and his publisher, Henry Holt and Company, a cease and desist letter demanding the non-publication of Wolff's White House exposé, Fire and Fury, due for release on January 9. Wolff's publishers move the date of publication forward to January 5.; Secretary of the Interior Ryan Zinke announces a plan to open up 90% of the U.S. coastline to oil drilling.	
Friday, January 5	The Trump administration submits to Congress initial details of a request for $18 billion to fund 316 miles of new barriers and upgrades to 407 miles of existing barriers along the Mexican border.; Wolff's Fire and Fury is published. President Trump describes it on Twitter as a "phony book", "full of lies, misrepresentations and sources that don't exist".; BSEE Director Scott Angelle announces plans to overhaul the oil-industry regulations introduced following 2010's Deepwater Horizon disaster.; President Trump leaves for Camp David for a weekend of meetings with his Cabinet, Republican party leaders, and Vice President Pence. It is reported that a decision is expected concerning whether the administration will move next to welfare reform or infrastructure.; NSA Director Michael S. Rogers announces his retirement for spring 2018.; Following a personal interview with President Trump, former Deutsche Bank lawyer Geoffrey Berman takes up his position as interim U.S. attorney for the Southern District of New York. Berman shortly afterwards appoints as his deputy Deutsche Bank's former U.S. general counsel Robert Khuzami.	
Saturday, January 6	President Trump tweets that he is "a very stable genius", praising his own "mental stability". Also within the tweet, he says he became president "on the first try", despite having run as a Reform Party candidate in 2000.; President Trump declares "everyone found that, after a year of study, there's been absolutely no collusion ... between us and the Russians." Meanwhile, the special counsel investigation into such matters are still in progress with no declared findings.	
Sunday, January 7		
Monday, January 8	President Trump makes an on-field appearance during the National Anthem at the 2018 College Football Playoff National Championship.; The Trump administration announces the end in September 2019 to the temporary protected status granted to nearly 200,000 Salvadorans by then-president George W. Bush following the 2001 El Salvador earthquakes.; President Trump submits to the Senate 21 re-nominations for judicial posts, including two rated 'not qualified' by the ABA.; Vice President Pence describes Fire and Fury as a "book of fiction", while saying he has not read the book and does not intend to.	President Trump on the field at Mercedes-Benz Stadium in Atlanta
Tuesday, January 9	President Trump holds a bipartisan meeting with members of Congress discussing the topic of immigration.; District judge William Alsup rules that the DACA program must remain in place while litigation continues over the Trump administration's September 5 decision to end it. The next morning, Trump describes the U.S. court system as "broken and unfair".; Secretary Zinke announces that Florida will be exempted from oil drilling under the new policy announced on January 4.	
Wednesday, January 10	President Trump describes Senator Dianne Feinstein as "sneaky" and a "disgrace" following her unilateral publication on January 9 of the Simpson testimony of August 2017 concerning research into potential crimes in respect of the 2016 election.; President Trump reiterates that he will be reviewing libel law, describing the current law as "a sham and a disgrace".; President Trump holds a bilateral meeting and joint press conference with Norwegian Prime Minister Erna Solberg at the White House.	A joint press conference with President Trump and Norwegian Prime Minister Erna Solberg
Thursday, January 11	The Trump administration announces new state guidelines that Medicaid recipients may be required to work or volunteer, or enroll in education.; The Washington Post reports that President Trump, in a meeting with Senators Lindsey Graham (R-SC) and Dick Durbin (D-IL) regarding immigration law reform, referred to Haiti and African countries as "shithole countries" and expressed preference for immigrants from Norway. On the following day, Trump denies using the term, but says he used tough language in regards to the countries; Senator Durbin affirmed that Trump had made those remarks.; Vice President Pence visits Las Vegas, Nevada, and speaks at nearby Nellis Air Force Base.	
Friday, January 12	President Trump proclaims Martin Luther King Jr. Day for January 15.; President Trump cancels a planned visit to the UK, blaming his predecessor, Barack Obama, for a "bad deal" on the new embassy due to be opened in London, despite the fact it was agreed under George W. Bush.; The Wall Street Journal reports that, in October 2016, President Trump's lawyer, Michael Cohen, arranged a payment of $130,000 to the adult-film actress Stormy Daniels in exchange for her silence regarding a 2006 extramarital affair. Cohen denies that Trump had sexual relations with Daniels. Fellow adult-film actress Alana Evans said Daniels told her she had "ended up with Donald in his hotel room".; Citing disagreements with the Trump administration, John Feeley announces his resignation as U.S. Ambassador to Panama, effective March 9, 2018.	
Saturday, January 13	President Trump is briefed at the White House concerning Hawaii's emergency management protocol following a public disturbance due to a false alarm of an incoming ballistic missile.	
Sunday, January 14		
Monday, January 15	Secretary of State Rex Tillerson co-hosts with Canadian Foreign Affairs Minister Chrystia Freeland the first of two days of talks in Vancouver concerning the North Korea crisis.; Nine of the twelve members of the National Park System Advisory Board resign following Interior Secretary Zinke's refusal to convene meetings.; The Wall Street Journal reports that Jared Kushner was warned in early 2017 by U.S. intelligence officials that his friend Wendi Deng Murdoch may be a Chinese spy.	
Tuesday, January 16	President Trump holds a bilateral meeting and joint press conference with Kazakhstani President Nursultan Nazarbayev at the White House.; President Trump's former Chief Strategist Steve Bannon is questioned at a private sitting of the House Intelligence Committee. He is issued with a subpoena during the meeting upon citing executive privilege to refuse questions about the Trump transition and administration, but maintains his refusal.	A joint press conference with President Trump and Kazakhstani President Nursultan Nazarbayev
Wednesday, January 17	In an Oval Office interview for Reuters, President Trump accuses Russia of harming Chinese/American efforts to solve the ongoing North Korean nuclear crisis.; In Touch Weekly publishes excerpts from a 2011 interview with adult-film actress Stormy Daniels alleging a 2006 extramarital affair with Trump. The magazine describes her passing a polygraph and her friend's and ex-husband's both corroborating the interview.; President Trump announces the winners of the "Fake News Awards", despite criticism from Republican senators Jeff Flake and John McCain.	
Thursday, January 18	President Trump delivers a speech at a factory near Pittsburgh, Pennsylvania. He offers his support for Republican candidate Rick Saccone in the upcoming March 13 special election for Pennsylvania's 18th district.; The House passes a short-term government budget in advance of a deadline of midnight January 19–20.; It is widely reported that Hungarian police have an active arrest warrant, issued on September 17, 2016, against former Trump White House advisor Sebastian Gorka. The warrant concerns alleged abuse of firearms.	
Friday, January 19	President Trump states on Twitter that Democratic votes will be needed in the Senate to prevent a government shutdown at midnight. He writes, "but they want illegal immigration and weak borders".; German periodical Manager Magazin reports that Deutsche Bank has presented to Germany's financial authority, BaFin, evidence concerning "suspicious money transfers" by White House advisor Jared Kushner. MM reports that this information is due to be handed to Robert Mueller's inquiry. Deutsche Bank on January 22 denies the report, and announces that it is taking legal action.	
Saturday, January 20	President Trump completes his first year in office.; A federal government shutdown begins, after the Senate fails to pass a continuing resolution to maintain funding for the government.; Vice President Pence arrives in Cairo, Egypt at the start of a tour of Africa and the Middle East.	President Trump on the phone in the Oval Office
Sunday, January 21	Vice President Pence meets with King Abdullah II of Jordan in Amman. Abdullah criticizes the decision to recognize Jerusalem as the Israeli capital. Pence reaffirms U.S. respect towards Jordan's role as the guardian of Jerusalem's Islamic holy sites.	
Monday, January 22	During the third day of the federal government shutdown, President Trump accuses the Democratic Party of precipitating the shutdown "in the interests of their far left base".; President Trump signs a bi-partisan bill, which passed Congress with support from both parties, officially ending the government shutdown that began three days earlier. The bill provides funds until February 8, 2018.; Vice President Pence delivers a speech at Israel's Knesset, announcing that the U.S. will relocate its embassy from Tel Aviv to Jerusalem by the end of 2019. A number of Arab members of Parliament are ejected while protesting.	
Tuesday, January 23	Vice President Pence visits Jerusalem's Western Wall.	
Wednesday, January 24	President Trump announces during remarks at the White House that he is willing to testify to Mueller under oath, stating, "I would love to do it, and I would like to do it as soon as possible."; The Senate confirms Alex Azar as the 24th U.S. Secretary of Health and Human Services in a vote of 55–43.	
Thursday, January 25	President Trump arrives in Davos, Switzerland to attend the 2018 Davos World Economic Forum. He is the first U.S. President to personally attend the annual Davos conference since President Bill Clinton in 2000. U.S. Treasury Secretary Steve Mnuchin is head of the U.S. delegation, which is the largest ever to attend the forum.; The New York Times first reports that President Trump ordered the dismissal of the special counsel, Robert Mueller, in June 2017, on three alleged pretexts of conflicts of interest, but retreated upon the threatened resignation of White House counsel Don McGahn; this elevated concerns of possible obstruction of justice. The report is confirmed by The Washington Post.; First Lady Melania Trump visits the United States Holocaust Memorial Museum in Washington, D.C.	
Friday, January 26	President Trump denies ordering the dismissal of Mueller, describing it as 'fake news'.; President Trump returns to the White House from Switzerland.	"I'm here to deliver a simple message ..."
Saturday, January 27		
Sunday, January 28		
Monday, January 29	The Trump administration submits five reports to Congress as mandated by the Countering America's Adversaries Through Sanctions Act (CAATSA), including two versions (one classified) of the report "regarding senior political figures and oligarchs in the Russian Federation and Russian parastatal entities". The unclassified list published the following day by the Treasury Department contains names of 210 people, including 96 Russian tycoons close to president Vladimir Putin with wealth of $1 billion or more, as well as top Russian statespersons and officials, excluding Vladimir Putin, all information having been drawn from public sources.; Alex Azar is sworn in as the 24th U.S. Secretary of Health and Human Services.; Deputy FBI Director Andrew McCabe resigns from his position, but remained as part of the FIB, after criticism from President Trump in preceding weeks. McCabe had been expected to step down in March.	President Trump congratulates Azar after being sworn in as the Secretary of Health and Human Services.
Tuesday, January 30	President Trump delivers his first official State of the Union Address with a wide-ranging speech covering matters of natural disasters, terrorism, immigration, economic growth, patriotism and the U.S. nuclear arsenal. He calls on Congress for a $1.5 trillion infrastructure investment bill and an end to political division.; The White House confirms that President Trump has signed an order keeping open the Guantanamo Bay detention camp in Cuba.; Treasury Secretary Steve Mnuchin announces that U.S. sanctions against Russian oligarchs will follow the previous day's list, and denies that the administration is "slow-walking" the process.	President Trump delivers his first official State of the Union Address.
Wednesday, January 31	Doctor Brenda Fitzgerald resigns as Director of the Centers for Disease Control over conflicts of interest.	

=== February 2018 ===
Date	Events	Photos/videos
Thursday, February 1	Tom Shannon, the United States Under Secretary of State for Political Affairs, announces he will be resigning for personal reasons. The State Department's third-ranking official and its most senior career diplomat says he will stay on until a successor is named.	
Friday, February 2	President Trump declassifies the Nunes memo and authorizes Congress to release it.	
Saturday, February 3		
Sunday, February 4		
Monday, February 5	At a speech in Cincinnati, Ohio, President Trump claims that Congressional Democrats, who "were like death and un-American" in not applauding during his State of the Union speech, were "treasonous" and that "we call that treason".	
Tuesday, February 6	While Congress was preparing a continuing resolution for a temporary budget, President Trump declared, "I'd love to see a shutdown" if American immigration laws were not tightened. He also said "it's worth it for our country".	
Wednesday, February 7	White House Staff Secretary Rob Porter resigns from his position following two public allegations of spousal abuse.; Associate Attorney General Rachel Brand resigns in order to enter the private sector.	
Thursday, February 8	President Trump speaks at the National Prayer Breakfast.	
Friday, February 9	Federal funding lapsed for the second time in 2018 after Republican Senator Rand Paul delayed the vote on a temporary appropriations bill by objecting to measures requiring unanimous consent to expedite the parliamentary process.; Congress passes a budget bill to end the federal funding gap within six hours; President Trump signs the bill into law.	
Saturday, February 10		
Sunday, February 11		
Monday, February 12	President Trump sends his $4.4 trillion 2019 budget proposal to Congress.; President Trump introduces his $1.5 trillion federal infrastructure plan to several governors and mayors at the White House.	
Tuesday, February 13	President Trump's personal lawyer Michael Cohen acknowledged that in 2016 he paid $130,000 of his own money to adult-film actress Stormy Daniels. Cohen further said that The Trump Organization and the Trump campaign were not involved in the payment and did not reimburse him. It was earlier reported that the payment was hush money for Daniels' silence regarding an alleged extramarital affair with Trump in 2006.	
Wednesday, February 14		
Thursday, February 15	President Trump addresses the nation in regards to the school shooting in Parkland offering his condolences to the victims and their families.	President Trump addresses the nation following the Parkland school shooting.
Friday, February 16	The New Yorker reports that President Trump had a nine-month extramarital affair with Playboy model Karen McDougal from June 2006, citing handwritten memoirs by McDougal provided by her friend. The New Yorker also corroborated a 2016 Wall Street Journal report that American Media, Inc (AMI) had paid $150,000 for exclusive rights to McDougal's story, but never published it. AMI has described the story as not credible, and a spokesperson for the White House denied the affair.; President Trump and First Lady Melania Trump visit victims of the Parkland school shooting at Broward Health North Medical Center.	President Trump and First Lady Melania Trump meet Parkland shooting victim Maddy Wilford.
Saturday, February 17		
Sunday, February 18		
Monday, February 19		
Tuesday, February 20	President Trump orders the Department of Justice to prepare regulations to ban devices that allow semi-automatic rifles to become fully automatic, such as the bump stocks used in the 2017 Las Vegas shooting.	
Wednesday, February 21	President Trump meets with survivors of the Parkland shooting to discuss school safety.	
Thursday, February 22	President Trump meets with local and state officials on school safety.	President Trump meets with state and local officials on school safety.
Friday, February 23	President Trump delivers a speech in Oxon Hill, Maryland to the 2018 Conservative Political Action Conference.; President Trump holds a bilateral meeting and joint press conference with Australian Prime Minister Malcolm Turnbull at the White House.	President Trump at the 2018 CPAC President Trump and Australian Prime Minister Malcolm Turnbull
Saturday, February 24	A Democratic memo titled Correcting the Record—The Russia Investigation in response to the Nunes memo, is released after redacting by the FBI.	
Sunday, February 25	President Trump attends the National Governors Association dinner.	
Monday, February 26		
Tuesday, February 27	Josh Raffel, a senior communications aide, announced his resignation from the administration.; Joseph Yun, the top diplomat in charge of America's Korean policy, announces his resignation.	
Wednesday, February 28	At the lying in honor of evangelical preacher Billy Graham in the U.S. Capitol rotunda, President Trump and congressional leaders praise Graham.; A day after being interviewed by the U.S. House Intelligence Committee, White House Communications Director Hope Hicks submits her resignation.	President Trump and First Lady Melania Trump at Billy Graham's lying in honor

=== March 2018 ===
Date	Events	Photos/videos
Thursday, March 1	Two-time NBA champions Golden State Warriors toured the National Museum of African American History and Culture as an alternative to the traditional White House visit.; The U.S. Fish and Wildlife Service removes the blanket ban on imports of sport-hunted trophies of elephants from certain African countries originally imposed by the Obama administration. The trophies will now be evaluated on a case-by-case basis. The organization also withdrew several Endangered Species Act findings regarding African elephants, lions and the bontebok antelopes.; Roberta Jacobson, the Ambassador to Mexico, resigns from her post.	
Friday, March 2		
Saturday, March 3	In a private speech to Republican donors at Mar-a-Lago, President Trump says "it's great" that Chinese President Xi Jinping was able to become "president for life", and that "maybe we'll have to give that a shot some day."	
Sunday, March 4		
Monday, March 5	President Trump holds a bilateral meeting with Israeli Prime Minister Benjamin Netanyahu at the White House.	President Trump and Israeli Prime Minister Benjamin Netanyahu
Tuesday, March 6	The U.S. Office of Special Counsel (OSC) says Counselor to the President Kellyanne Conway violated federal law in the form of the Hatch Act during two television interviews in 2017 by advocating for the defeat of Doug Jones and the election of Roy Moore for Alabama's election for a Senate seat. The White House has disputed this finding by the OSC.; Chief economic adviser Gary Cohn announces plan to resign after President Trump announced he would impose tariffs on steel and aluminum imports.; President Trump holds a bilateral meeting and joint press conference with Swedish Prime Minister Stefan Löfven at the White House.	A joint press conference between President Trump and Swedish Prime Minister Stefan Löfven
Wednesday, March 7	White House Press Secretary Sarah Huckabee Sanders says President Trump's personal attorneys have won an arbitration case against adult-film actress Stormy Daniels. NBC News reports that Trump's lawyer, Michael Cohen, on February 27 initiated a private arbitration case against Daniels and obtained a restraining order that states that Daniels will face penalties if she discusses, in public, her alleged relationship with Trump. Daniels has filed a lawsuit that her non-disclosure agreement regarding her alleged relationship with Trump is invalid because Trump never signed it.; U.S. Forest Service Chief Tom Tooke resigns from his post.	
Thursday, March 8	President Trump signs proclamations which will impose tariffs on imported steel and aluminum from most countries in 15 days. Canada and Mexico are initially exempted from these tariffs while they talk with the U.S. about renegotiating NAFTA.; President Trump accepts an invitation to meet with North Korean Leader Kim Jong-un by May 2018.; President Trump meets with video-game executives to discuss how violent video games might contribute to mass shootings.	
Friday, March 9	President Trump pardons Kristian Saucier, who was convicted of unauthorized possession and retention of national defense information.; White House Press Secretary Sarah Huckabee Sanders says the White House would need to see "concrete and verifiable steps" toward the denuclearization of North Korea before Trump would meet with Kim Jong-un. An unidentified Trump official tells The Wall Street Journal that Trump has still accepted Jong-un's invitation.	
Saturday, March 10	President Trump holds a rally at the Pittsburgh International Airport to support Rick Saccone in an upcoming special election. He introduces his 2020 campaign slogan: "Keep America Great!"	
Sunday, March 11	The Trump administration proposes gun and school safety measures, including improving the system of background checks and training school personnel to handle firearms.	
Monday, March 12	Citing national security concerns, President Trump blocks Broadcom's proposed acquisition of Qualcomm.	
Tuesday, March 13	President Trump fires Rex Tillerson as Secretary of State, names former CIA director Mike Pompeo as the new Secretary of State, and nominates Gina Haspel as the next director of the CIA. Deputy Secretary of State John J. Sullivan becomes Acting Secretary of State.; Steve Goldstein, the United States Under Secretary of State for Public Diplomacy and Public Affairs and fourth ranking diplomatic official, is fired by the White House. Trump designates Heather Nauert as Goldstein's replacement.; John McEntee, a long-time personal assistant to President Trump, is fired and escorted from the White House. McEntee then joins Trump's re-election campaign as a senior adviser, along with Katrina Pierson.	
Wednesday, March 14	President Trump chooses Larry Kudlow as director of the National Economic Council, replacing Gary Cohn.	
Thursday, March 15	The Trump administration uses the Countering America's Adversaries Through Sanctions Act to impose financial sanctions on the 13 Russian government hackers and spy agencies indicted in the Special Counsel investigation.; President Trump holds a bilateral meeting with Irish Taoiseach Leo Varadkar at the White House.	President Trump and Taoiseach Leo Varadkar
Friday, March 16	Andrew McCabe, former acting director of the FBI who was due to retire with benefits in two days, was fired from the FBI by Attorney General Jeff Sessions on the recommendation of FBI disciplinary officials for "lack of candor".	
Saturday, March 17		
Sunday, March 18		
Monday, March 19		
Tuesday, March 20	The Kremlin announces President Trump's call to congratulate Russian President Vladimir Putin on his election victory. National security advisers warned Trump against the call.; President Trump meets with Crown Prince Mohammad bin Salman of Saudi Arabia in the Oval Office.	President Trump and Crown Prince Mohammad bin Salman of Saudi Arabia
Wednesday, March 21		
Thursday, March 22	H. R. McMaster resigns as National Security Adviser and John Bolton, a former ambassador to the United Nations, is named to succeed him.	
Friday, March 23	The White House issues a memorandum on Jim Mattis's recommended military policies, which state that transgender personnel are "disqualified from military service except under limited circumstances".; The U.S. charges and sanctions nine Iranians and the Iranian company Mabna Institute for hacking and attempting to hack hundreds of universities on behalf of the Iranian government.	
Saturday, March 24		
Sunday, March 25		
Monday, March 26	The White House announces the expulsion of 60 Russian diplomats.	
Tuesday, March 27		
Wednesday, March 28	President Trump fires Secretary of Veteran Affairs David Shulkin and nominates White House doctor Ronny L. Jackson to replace him.	
Thursday, March 29		
Friday, March 30		
Saturday, March 31	Rex Tillerson's last day as Secretary of State; President Trump nominates CIA Director Mike Pompeo as the next Secretary of State.	

== See also ==
- First 100 days of the first Trump presidency – Period from January to April 2017
- List of executive actions by Donald Trump
- Lists of presidential trips made by Donald Trump (international trips)
- First presidential transition of Donald Trump – Transfer of presidential power from Barack Obama to Donald Trump
- Timeline of the 2016 United States presidential election

U.S. presidential administration timelines
Preceded by First Trump presidency (2017 Q4)	First Trump presidency (2018 Q1)	Succeeded by First Trump presidency (2018 Q2)
