= Timeline of the first Trump presidency (2018 Q3) =

The following is a timeline of the first presidency of Donald Trump during the third quarter of 2018, from July 1 to September 30, 2018. For a complete itinerary of his travels, see List of presidential trips made by Donald Trump (2018). To navigate between quarters, see timeline of the Donald Trump presidencies. For the Q4 timeline see timeline of the first Trump presidency (2018 Q4).

== Timeline ==
=== July 2018 ===
Date	Events	Photos/videos
Sunday, July 1		
Monday, July 2	President Trump holds a bilateral meeting with Dutch Prime Minister Mark Rutte at the White House.	President Trump and Dutch Prime Minister Mark Rutte
Tuesday, July 3		
Wednesday, July 4	President Trump hosts military personnel and their families for a picnic and fireworks show at the White House as part of Independence Day celebrations.	
Thursday, July 5	Scott Pruitt resigns as EPA Administrator, effective July 6, amidst fifteen federal investigations by various government ethics agencies for his assorted management scandals (see here for descriptions.)	
Friday, July 6	Andrew Wheeler, a former coal lobbyist and Deputy Administrator of the EPA since April 2018, succeeds Scott Pruitt as acting EPA administrator.	
Saturday, July 7		
Sunday, July 8		
Monday, July 9	President Trump nominates Brett Kavanaugh as an Associate Justice of the Supreme Court to fill the vacancy left by the impending retirement of Anthony Kennedy.	President Trump nominates Brett Kavanaugh for the Supreme Court Justice
Tuesday, July 10		
Wednesday, July 11		
Thursday, July 12	President Trump and First Lady Melania Trump attend a black-tie dinner at Blenheim Palace.	
Friday, July 13	Special counsel Robert Mueller indicts twelve Russian intelligence officers, alleging that they "engag[ed] in a 'sustained effort' to hack Democrats' emails and computer networks".; President Trump holds a bilateral meeting and joint press conference with British Prime Minister Theresa May at Chequers. President Trump advises May to "sue the E.U." during Brexit negotiations.; President Trump and First Lady Melania Trump meet with Queen Elizabeth II at Windsor Castle for the first time since becoming president. Their meeting makes Trump the 12th incumbent US president the Queen has met during her reign.	A Joint Press Conference between President Trump and British Prime Minister Theresa May at Chequers President Trump and First Lady Melania Trump with Queen Elizabeth II at Windsor Castle.
Saturday, July 14		
Sunday, July 15	President Trump remarks during a CBS interview, "Now you wouldn't think of the European Union, but they're a foe," in response to a question about the biggest foes of the United States.	
Monday, July 16	President Trump and Russian President Vladimir Putin participate in the summit at the Presidential Palace in Helsinki, Finland. At the joint press conference, Trump reiterates both his faulting of "U.S. foolishness and stupidity" and the Mueller investigation for the freeze in relations between Russia and the United States and his refusal to recognize the Russian government's interference in the 2016 U.S. elections, despite extensive assessments by United States intelligence agencies.; President Trump receives bi-partisan criticism: prominent Republican senators call his summit performance "disgraceful", "shameful", and "a sign of weakness"; former CIA Director John Brennan calls it "imbecilic" and "nothing short of treasonous".	President Trump and Russian President Vladimir Putin.
Tuesday, July 17	The Treasury Department repeals the requirement of some non-profit groups, most prominently the National Rifle Association of America (NRA), to disclose their donor lists to the Internal Revenue Service. The rule change is announced whilst the NRA was named as the "primary avenue of influence" for Maria Butina, a Russian national charged on July 16 by the national security division of the Justice Department with conspiracy to act as an agent of the Russian government within the United States without the requisite notification to the U.S. Attorney General. The affidavit alleges that Butina (along with an unnamed business partner, presumed to be Aleksandr Torshin) "infiltrat[ed] organizations having influence in American politics, for the purpose of advancing the interests of the Russian Federation".; Trump claims that he misspoke in his joint press conference with Putin the previous day, saying "I don't see any reason why it would be Russia" when he intended to say "I don't see any reason why it wouldn't be Russia": It should have been obvious—I thought it would be obvious—but I would like to clarify, just in case it wasn't. In a key sentence in my remarks, I said the word "would" instead of "wouldn't". The sentence should have been: "I don't see any reason why I wouldn't—or why it wouldn't be Russia." So just to repeat it, I said the word "would" instead of "wouldn't". And the sentence should have been—and I thought it would be maybe a little bit unclear on the transcript or unclear on the actual video—the sentence should have been: "I don't see any reason why it wouldn't be Russia." Sort of a double negative.: Trump's new remarks are criticized by some Democratic senators who do not believe he misspoke and thought his "back-handed retraction" was "too late".	President Trump's statement on the 17th of July.
Wednesday, July 18	When asked by a reporter before a Cabinet meeting whether he believes that the Russian government continues to make efforts to interfere in American elections, Trump replied, "no". However, Sarah Huckabee Sanders (the White House Press Secretary) disputed that Trump was in fact answering the reporter's question when he said "no", and Trump himself refused to clarify his intent to the press later in the day.; The New York Times reports that Trump was briefed on January 6, 2017, regarding the Russian government's attempts to interfere in American elections. Trump "sounded begrudgingly convinced", according to the Times's sources.; Trump receives a public request from Russian prosecutors for permission to interrogate eleven American citizens, including former Amb. Michael McFaul, as part of an investigation into financial crimes that the Russian government alleges against American hedge-fund manager Bill Browder. Trump did not immediately decline the request, with Sarah Huckabee Sanders saying that Trump is "gonna meet with his team" regarding the request.	President Trump replies "no".
Thursday, July 19	After a non-binding resolution to oppose permitting Russian investigators to interrogate any American citizen passes in the United States Senate by a vote of 98–0, the Trump administration issues a statement that the request "was made in sincerity by President Putin, but President Trump disagrees with it".; Trump invites Russian President Vladimir Putin to Washington, D.C., in the fall, according to a tweet from Sarah Huckabee Sanders.; Dan Coats (the Director of National Intelligence) reacts to the news of the Putin invitation in a manner deemed by White House officials to be "laughing at the president", and a senior White House official anonymously says to The Washington Post that "Coats has gone rogue".	
Friday, July 20	The New York Times reports that Trump's long-time lawyer, Michael Cohen, secretly recorded a phone call in which Trump and Cohen discuss a September 2016 payment, in the amount of $150,000, by American Media, Inc. (the owner of the National Enquirer) to Playboy model Karen McDougal in order to acquire the exclusive rights to her story of her 2006 affair with Trump. The National Enquirer never planned on publishing McDougal's story, so the payment (termed a "catch and kill" payment) effectively silenced McDougal's story for the duration of the 2016 presidential campaign. The Times also reported that the tape contains a discussion of a back-payment from Trump to American Media, Inc.; the reporting directly contradicted Trump's long-standing claim that he had no knowledge of the payment to either McDougal or American Media, Inc.; Rudy Giuliani, Trump's legal adviser, comments that the tape is, in fact, "powerful exculpatory evidence". Some commentators conclude that Trump's legal team, not Cohen's legal team, had leaked the tape to the media; the tape had originally been shielded from prosecutors due to attorney–client privilege, which was waived by Trump's legal team. Some commentators speculate that Trump's legal team released the tape partly to deny Cohen a bargaining device in potential plea negotiations involving cooperation with federal investigations.; Special counsel Robert Mueller moves to subpoena Kristin Davis, the prostitution mogul known as the "Manhattan Madam". Davis had been best known for her role in the 2008 prostitution scandal involving then-Governor Eliot Spitzer of New York, but she was also a former employee of Roger Stone, a Republican political operative and strategist for Trump.	
Saturday, July 21		
Sunday, July 22	Trump tweets that Russian interference in the 2016 U.S. elections is "all a big hoax", appearing to reverse his position yet again on whether the Russian government interfered (and continues to attempt to interfere) in U.S. elections.; Trump tweets a threat to Iranian President Hassan Rouhani: NEVER, EVER THREATEN THE UNITED STATES AGAIN OR YOU WILL SUFFER CONSEQUENCES THE LIKES OF WHICH FEW THROUGHOUT HISTORY HAVE EVER SUFFERED BEFORE. WE ARE NO LONGER A COUNTRY THAT WILL STAND FOR YOUR DEMENTED WORDS OF VIOLENCE & DEATH. BE CAUTIOUS! The threat was the culmination of a weekend of intense rhetorical exchange between the Trump administration and the Rouhani administration. Trump's tweet was in response to Rouhani's message that war with Iran would be "the mother of all wars"; Rouhani also warned Trump to "not play with the lion's tail, because you will regret it eternally". Rouhani's message was, in turn, in response to a scathing speech made by Mike Pompeo (the U.S. Secretary of State), which included an allegation that Rouhani owns a $95 billion hedge fund; Pompeo also stated that "to the [Iranian] regime, prosperity, security, and freedom for the Iranian people are acceptable casualties in the march to fulfill the Revolution", and that "the level of corruption and wealth among regime leaders shows that Iran is run by something that resembles the mafia more than a government".	
Monday, July 23	President Trump publicly considers revoking security clearances for former top-level officials (including John Brennan, James Clapper, James Comey, Susan Rice, Andrew McCabe, and Michael Hayden); Trump claims that the former officials' public comments about the Special Counsel investigation are "inappropriate", and Sarah Huckabee Sanders accused the former officials of "politicizing and ... monetizing their public service".; The Senate confirms Robert Wilkie as the 10th U.S. Secretary of Veterans Affairs in a vote of 86–9; Wilkie served as an under-secretary in the U.S. Department of Defense since November 2017 (and previously from 2006 to 2009 under President George W. Bush) and also served as acting Veterans' Affairs secretary from March 2018 to May 2018 following David Shulkin's resignation.; President Trump launches "Made in America Week" at the White House by showcasing products made in all 50 states.	President Trump at the White House Made in America showcase.
Tuesday, July 24	At a speech to the annual convention of a veterans' organization (Veterans of Foreign Wars) in Kansas City, Trump says that "what you're seeing and what you're reading [in the media] is not what's happening". Some observers describe this quote as "Orwellian".; The September 2016 tape, the existence of which was revealed on July 20, is published by CNN on its 9:00 p.m. show, Cuomo Prime Time. The three-minute recording proves that Trump and his then-lawyer, Michael Cohen, did discuss the $150,000 payment to American Media, Inc., as claimed on July 20. Moreover, Trump and Cohen can be heard discussing whether to make the payment in cash; on the recording, Trump appears to suggest a cash payment, and Cohen appears to dismiss the suggestion. According to The New York Times, the salient portion of the "sometimes muddled" recording reads as follows: Mr. Cohen is heard telling Mr. Trump that he will need to set up a company to arrange the payments. Mr. Trump then asked, "What financing?" "We'll have to pay," Mr. Cohen said. Mr. Trump then appears to say, "Pay with cash." Mr. Cohen then says, "No, no." The word "check" is uttered, but it is not clear by whom, and the audio is then cut off. However, Trump's legal team disputes this.	
Wednesday, July 25	Eleven Republican members of the House Judiciary Committee (all members of the House Freedom Caucus) file an impeachment resolution against Deputy Attorney General Rod Rosenstein, claiming that Rosenstein in his role as overseer of the Special Counsel investigation committed "high crimes and misdemeanors" in refusing to turn over information relating to the ongoing investigation to the House Judiciary Committee.; President Trump holds a bilateral meeting and joint press conference with European Commission President Jean-Claude Juncker at the White House.	President Trump and European Commission President Jean-Claude Juncker
Thursday, July 26	The House Republicans who filed an impeachment resolution against Deputy Attorney General Rod Rosenstein on July 26 back down, deciding not to continue with impeachment proceedings. This decision comes after many high-profile Republicans, including House Speaker Paul Ryan and U.S. Attorney General Jeff Sessions, criticize the impeachment resolution and express support for Rosenstein.; Trump's former lawyer, Michael Cohen, claims that Trump had contemporaneous knowledge of the June 2016 Trump Tower meeting between Trump campaign officials (including Trump's son, Don Jr., and son-in-law, Jared Kushner) and Russian lobbyists, where the Trump campaign was promised "dirt" on Hillary Clinton. While Trump has repeatedly denied that he knew that this meeting took place, Cohen claims that he is prepared to testify to the Special Counsel investigation that Trump knew in advance of the meeting. Commentators note that "this revelation, if true, would directly implicate Trump himself in an effort to conspire with a foreign power to tip the election to him, and a subsequent effort to cover that up." Trump tweets in his denial that "[it] sounds to me like someone is trying to make up stories in order to get himself out of an unrelated jam (Taxi cabs maybe?)."; The deadline (imposed on June 26 by Dana Sabraw, a U.S. District Court Judge for the Southern District of California) elapses to reunite all migrant families separated by the Trump administration. The government claims that the deadline has been met, but its court filing shows that 711 children (about a third of the 2,551 children separated from their families), whom the government has deemed "ineligible for reunification", are still in the custody of the Office of Refugee Resettlement.	
Friday, July 27		
Saturday, July 28		
Sunday, July 29	President Trump tweets a threat to support a government shutdown if Democratic lawmakers do not vote for "Border Security, which includes the Wall!"	
Monday, July 30	President Trump holds a bilateral meeting and joint press conference with Italian Prime Minister Giuseppe Conte at the White House.; After President Trump has claimed "no collusion" for months, his legal adviser Rudy Giuliani says that "I don't even know if [colluding with Russia] is a crime". Another Trump adviser, former Gov. Chris Christie of New Jersey, echoes the sentiment, saying that "collusion is not a crime". While there technically is no crime called 'collusion' in the U.S. Code, legal experts agree that 'collusion' is an informal shorthand for a number of similar charges, especially conspiracy, which are in the Code, and that the difference between 'collusion' and 'conspiracy' is "just a word choice". Giuliani's and Christie's claims come on the eve of the trial of former Trump campaign chair, Paul Manafort.; Giuliani also claimed the existence of a previously-unknown June 7, 2016, meeting between Trump campaign officials and Russian lobbyists preceding the Trump Tower meeting on June 9, 2016; however, Giuliani later said that the meeting "never happened". Asked how he could be sure that the July 26 claim by Trump's former lawyer Michael Cohen (that Trump had advance knowledge of the Trump Tower meeting) was false, Giuliani replied, "Nobody can be sure of anything".; President Trump offers to meet Iranian President Hassan Rouhani with "no preconditions". This follows a heated exchange between the Trump administration and Rouhani on July 21 and July 22.; Robert Wilkie is sworn in as the 10th U.S. Secretary of Veterans Affairs.; According to U.S. intelligence agencies, North Korea continues to construct nuclear missiles capable of reaching the United States, despite peace talks at the June 12 summit between Trump and Chairman Kim Jong-un.	A Joint Press Conference with President Trump and Italian Prime Minister Giuseppe Conte
Tuesday, July 31	The trial of former Trump campaign chair, Paul Manafort, begins in the U.S. District Court for the Eastern District of Virginia.; Anthony Kennedy retires as Associate Justice of the U.S. Supreme Court, formalizing a decision announced on June 27.; During a rally in Florida, President Trump defends strict "voter ID" laws by claiming that Americans are required to show identification to purchase groceries.	

=== August 2018 ===
Date	Events	Photos/videos
Wednesday, August 1	President Trump tweets that "Attorney General Jeff Sessions should stop this Rigged Witch Hunt right now, before it continues to stain our country any further", the first time Trump has publicly and explicitly called for the termination of the Special Counsel investigation. Many observers note that this tweet raises concerns about possible obstruction of justice, while Rudy Giuliani (Trump's legal adviser) claims that Trump intentionally chose the word "should" because he was expressing an opinion rather than issuing an order to Sessions; Sarah Huckabee Sanders (the White House Press Secretary) echoes Giuliani's sentiments, saying, "It's not an order. It's the president's opinion."	
Thursday, August 2	Sarah Huckabee Sanders (the White House Press Secretary) calls the press the "enemy of the people".; At a press conference, top national security officials (Dan Coats, Kirstjen Nielsen, John Bolton, Christopher Wray, and Paul Nakasone) announce that the administration will "make the matter of election meddling and securing our election process a top priority". The officials also affirm that the Russian government is attempting to interfere in the U.S. midterm elections, specifically with "a pervasive messaging campaign by Russia to try to weaken and divide the United States".	
Friday, August 3	A Justice Department filing on a case against the American Civil Liberties Union (ACLU) regarding reunification of separated migrant families argues that it is the responsibility of the plaintiffs (i.e., the ACLU), not the government, to use its "considerable resources" to find parents of separated children whom the government has already deported. The judge who requested the government filing (Dana Sabraw, a U.S. District Court Judge for the Southern District of California appointed by President George W. Bush) calls the government's slow pace in reuniting the separated families "unacceptable", and rejects "100%" the argument that the responsibility is on the ACLU to reunite the families.	
Saturday, August 4		
Sunday, August 5		
Monday, August 6		
Tuesday, August 7		
Wednesday, August 8		
Thursday, August 9	The White House director of strategic communications, Mercedes Schlapp, confirms with Univision that Helen Aguirre Ferré, the White House director of media affairs for Latino and African-American news outlets, has resigned from the White House.	
Friday, August 10		
Saturday, August 11		
Sunday, August 12	Two days before her memoir (Unhinged) is released, Omarosa Manigault, a former White House aide to Trump primarily known for her prior appearances on The Apprentice, a reality television show formerly hosted by Trump, releases audio recordings of Trump and John Kelly (Trump's White House Chief of Staff) regarding her January 2018 dismissal. Manigault claims that "there are tapes of [Trump] using the N-word repeatedly while filming The Apprentice reality series".	
Monday, August 13	In a flurry of early-morning tweets, President Trump describes Omarosa Manigault as "wacky", "vicious", "not smart", "nasty", "a loser", and "a lowlife", and claims that she "begged [Trump] for a job, tears in her eyes".; Prosecutors from the Special Counsel investigation rest their case in the trial of Paul Manafort.; Peter Strzok, an FBI agent and Chief of the Counter-espionage Section who was removed from Mueller's Special Counsel investigation upon the discovery of his anti-Trump texts, is dismissed from the FBI by Deputy Director David Bowdich. Strzok is notorious amongst right-wing legislators and media figures who leaked and scrutinized the text messages which he exchanged with fellow agent Lisa Page and which were falsely alleged to demonstrate anti-Trump bias that would have undermined Strzok's apolitical role as a leading investigator of the Russian government's interference in the 2016 U.S. elections.; President Trump signs legislation named the John S. McCain National Defense Authorization Act while not mentioning the Senator's name.	
Tuesday, August 14	President Trump tweets that Omarosa Manigault had been "a crazed, crying lowlife" when he gave her a job at the White House, describing the appointment as Trump giving Manigault "a break"; in the same tweet, Trump called Manigault a "dog". Some commentators express concern that Manigault, whose official title had been Assistant to the President and Director of Communications for the Office of Public Liaison, carrying a taxpayer-funded annual salary of $180,000, had been hired out of pity as Trump admits to knowing at the time that she was unqualified for the position.	
Wednesday, August 15	President Trump unilaterally revokes the security clearance of former CIA Director John Brennan, citing what Trump alleges to be Brennan's "erratic" behavior, "increasingly frenzied commentary", and his "series of unfounded and outrageous allegations"; many observers agree that this action appears to be retaliation for Brennan's outspokenness on the possible collusion to interfere in the 2016 elections by the Trump campaign and the Russian government being investigated the Special Counsel investigation, especially because Trump did not make an allegation that Brennan mis-handled or mis-used classified information that would have warranted the revocation. In an interview with The Wall Street Journal, Trump directly connected the revocation of Brennan's security clearance with his frustration at the ongoing Special Counsel investigation.	
Thursday, August 16	Former CIA Director John Brennan responds to Trump's unilateral revocation of his security clearance, contending in a New York Times opinion-editorial, that "Trump's 'no collusion' claims are hogwash", and that Trump "revoked [Brennan's] security clearance to try to silence anyone who would dare challenge him". In addition, William McRaven, a navy admiral best known for his role as special operations commander overseeing the raid that killed Osama bin Laden, publicly expresses a political position by authoring an opinion-editorial in The Washington Post in defense of Brennan; McRaven dares Trump to also revoke his security clearance, writing: I would consider it an honor if you would revoke my security clearance as well, so I can add my name to the list of men and women who have spoken up against your presidency. In response, President Trump threatens to revoke the security clearances of more former top-level intelligence officials. Observers draw comparisons between Trump's list of officials whose security clearances he threatens to revoke (which includes James Clapper, James Comey, Michael Hayden, Sally Yates, Susan Rice, Andrew McCabe, Peter Strzok, Lisa Page, and Bruce Ohr) and Richard Nixon's Enemies List.; Hundreds of newspapers across the United States publish editorials emphasizing the importance of the freedom of the press, a right which is guaranteed by the First Amendment. (The newspapers coordinated the publication date of the editorials, but each wrote an editorial independently.) The effort is in response to recent attacks by the Trump administration on the press, especially to combat the appellation, "enemy of the people".	
Friday, August 17	President Trump tweets that the military parade scheduled for November 2018 will be postponed due to cost. Trump blames "the local politicians who run Washington, D.C. (poorly)" of price gouging in reporting the estimated cost of the parade as $92 million, which covers $50 million for military equipment and aircraft, and $42 million for municipal costs such as security. Defense Secretary Jim Mattis accuses the individual writing the report asserting the $92 million figure of "probably smoking something that is legal in my state but not in most". Washington, D.C. Mayor Muriel Bowser responds by tweeting: Yup, I'm Muriel Bowser, mayor of Washington DC, the local politician who finally got thru to the reality star in the White House with the realities ($21.6M) of parades/events/demonstrations in Trump America (sad). OMB Director Mick Mulvaney says that there were other non-monetary considerations that factored into the decision to postpone the parade; Mulvaney would not specify the other "contributing factors".	
Saturday, August 18	The New York Times reports that the White House Counsel, Don McGahn, has testified for nearly thirty hours in three voluntary interviews with investigators working on the Special Counsel investigation. According to the report, Trump and his lawyers allowed McGahn to testify, and did not ask for a de-briefing of the content of his testimony, which included the manner in which FBI Director James Comey was dismissed, as well as other personnel-related matters, including Trump's "obsession with putting a loyalist in charge of the [Special Counsel] inquiry". In response to the report, Trump tweets that "disgraced and discredited Bob Mueller and his whole group of Angry Democrat Thugs spent over 30 hours with the White House Counsel, only with my approval, for purposes of transparency."	
Sunday, August 19	In an interview on Meet the Press, a news program on NBC hosted by Chuck Todd, Trump's legal adviser Rudy Giuliani says that "truth isn't truth". Giuliani later clarified that he was "referring to the situation where two people make precisely contradictory statements, the classic 'he said, she said' puzzle". Many observers, noting that this is the latest in a sequence of unusual statements, including Kellyanne Conway's "alternative facts", Trump's "fake news", and Trump's recent claim that "what you're seeing and what you're reading is not what's happening", draw comparisons to George Orwell's dystopian novel, 1984.	
Monday, August 20	President Trump attacks Bruce Ohr, a current senior Justice Department official, asking whether he will "ever be fired". Trump has attacked Ohr numerous times since August 11, alleging that he and his wife, Nellie, had been involved both in gathering information for the Steele dossier and in starting the FBI investigation into the Russian government's interference in the 2016 U.S. elections. Nellie Ohr worked for Fusion GPS, the firm which commissioned the dossier, and Bruce Ohr had contact with Christopher Steele, the author of the dossier, throughout its production. However, there is no evidence that Ohr had any involvement with either the FBI investigation or the Special Counsel investigation.; The New York Times reports that Trump's former personal attorney, Michael Cohen, is under investigation for bank fraud and tax evasion relating to loans amounting to $20 million, taken for Cohen's taxi medallion venture.	
Tuesday, August 21	The first trial of Paul Manafort, former chair of the Trump campaign, concludes, with the jury finding Manafort guilty on five counts of tax evasion, two counts of bank fraud, and one count of failure to disclose a foreign bank account; Manafort is acquitted on zero counts, and the judge, senior judge T. S. Ellis III of the U.S. District Court for the Eastern District of Virginia, declares a mis-trial on the remaining ten counts.; Michael Cohen, Trump's former personal attorney, pleads guilty to five counts of tax evasion, two counts of campaign finance violations, and one count of bank fraud. The campaign finance violations relate to Cohen's arrangement of payments in 2016 with American Media, Inc. to purchase the exclusive rights to the stories of Karen McDougal and Stormy Daniels, regarding their affairs with then-candidate Trump; these are regarded as "in-kind contributions" to Trump's campaign, and exceeded the maximum amount allowable by U.S. campaign finance law. In the court proceedings, Cohen makes a prepared statement on the charges, describing the counts in his own words; Cohen implicates Trump on the two counts of campaign finance violations, saying under oath, and under penalty of perjury, that he made the illegal campaign contributions "in coordination with, and at the direction of, a candidate for federal office [Trump]". Trump denies that he directed Cohen to make the payments.	Trump comments about Manafort conviction
Wednesday, August 22	President Trump makes a video statement on the death of Mollie Tibbetts.; The New York State Department of Taxation and Finance issues a subpoena to Michael Cohen (Trump's former personal attorney), as part of its ongoing investigation into whether the Donald J. Trump Foundation violated New York tax law. (Note that this is a separate investigation from the lawsuit filed in June 2018 by the office of the N.Y. Attorney General, Barbara Underwood, alleging that the Trump Foundation, which is subject to laws concerning charitable organizations, functioned as "little more than a checkbook for payments from Mr. Trump or his business to nonprofits, regardless of their purpose or legality".)	Trump talks about Mollie Tibbetts August 22, 2018, White house press briefing
Thursday, August 23	In an interview with Fox News, President Trump claims that "if I ever got impeached, I think the market would crash, I think everybody would be very poor".; David Pecker, the CEO of American Media, Inc. (which owns the National Enquirer magazine), who was, along with Trump, named by Michael Cohen in his guilty plea as an un-indicted co-conspirator in campaign finance violations committed in the payments to Stormy Daniels and Karen McDougal, is granted immunity by federal prosecutors in exchange for his testimony. A report by the Associated Press indicates that, during the 2016 election, the National Enquirer hid stories to which it had gained exclusive rights, but which were damaging to Trump, in a safe, as a form of 'friendly blackmail'; a National Enquirer reporter told the Associated Press, "It's 'I did this for you, now what can you do for me' ... they [the National Enquirer] always got something in return."	
Friday, August 24		
Saturday, August 25		
Sunday, August 26		
Monday, August 27	President Trump holds a bilateral meeting with Kenyan President Uhuru Kenyatta at the White House.	President Trump and Kenyan President Uhuru Kenyatta
Tuesday, August 28		
Wednesday, August 29		
Thursday, August 30	President Trump reveals that Jeff Sessions will remain Attorney General until after the fall 2018 mid-term elections in November during an interview on Bloomberg.	
Friday, August 31		

=== September 2018 ===
Date	Events	Photos/videos
Saturday, September 1	Former Senator John McCain's funeral held at Washington National Cathedral. President Trump was not invited to the funeral.	
Sunday, September 2		
Monday, September 3	President Trump sarcastically tweets "Good job Jeff ..." following the Justice Department indictments of Duncan Hunter and Chris Collins. Trump was criticizing Attorney General Jeff Sessions' handling of the investigations as supporting the Democratic agenda, adding that "the Democrats, none of whom voted for Jeff Sessions, must love him now."	
Tuesday, September 4	The Senate confirmation hearing for Brett Kavanaugh begins.	
Wednesday, September 5	The New York Times publishes an editorial written by an anonymous senior administration official in the Trump administration which is critical of President Trump.; President Trump holds a bilateral meeting with Emir Sabah Al-Ahmad Al-Jaber Al-Sabah of Kuwait at the White House.	President Trump and Emir Sabah Al-Ahmad Al-Jaber Al-Sabah of Kuwait.
Thursday, September 6		
Friday, September 7	Kavanaugh confirmation hearing ends with a vote scheduled for September 20. Over the course of the hearing, over 200 protesters were arrested by the Capitol Police.	
Saturday, September 8		
Sunday, September 9		
Monday, September 10		
Tuesday, September 11	President Trump speaks at the Flight 93 National Memorial to commemorate the 17th anniversary of the September 11 attacks.	President Trump and First Lady Melania Trump at the Flight 93 National Memorial on the 17th anniversary of 9/11
Wednesday, September 12	Democrats in the Senate reveal that they have received an allegation of sexual assault against Kavanaugh.	
Thursday, September 13		
Friday, September 14		
Saturday, September 15		
Sunday, September 16		
Monday, September 17	Christine Blasey Ford is identified as the source of the sexual assault allegation against Kavanaugh.; President Trump states that he will not withdraw Kavanaugh's nomination.; The Senate Judiciary Committee delays the confirmation vote to allow Kavanaugh and Ford to testify.; President Trump celebrates Hispanic Heritage Month at the White House.	
Tuesday, September 18	President Trump holds a bilateral meeting and joint press conference with Polish President Andrzej Duda at the White House.	President Trump and Polish President Andrzej Duda
Wednesday, September 19	President Trump visits areas affected by Hurricane Florence.; The Late Show with Stephen Colbert later turns remarks Trump made during the visit into the children's book Whose Boat Is This Boat?	President Trump in North Carolina
Thursday, September 20		
Friday, September 21		
Saturday, September 22		
Sunday, September 23	The New Yorker reports that Senate Democrats were informed of a second allegation of sexual assault against Kavanaugh.; President Trump holds a bilateral meeting and dinner with Japanese Prime Minister Shinzō Abe at Trump Tower.	President Trump and Japanese Prime Minister Shinzō Abe
Monday, September 24	President Trump attends the United Nations event on 'Global Drug Problem' at the Headquarters of the United Nations.; President Trump holds a bilateral meeting with South Korean President Moon Jae-in to sign new revisions into their free trade agreement.; President Trump holds bilateral meetings with Egyptian President Abdel Fattah el-Sisi and French President Emmanuel Macron at the UN General Assembly in New York City.	President Trump and South Korean President Moon Jae-in
Tuesday, September 25	President Trump holds a bilateral meeting with Colombian President Iván Duque Márquez at the UN General Assembly in New York City.; President Trump addressed the United Nations General Assembly at the Headquarters of the United Nations, and drew laughter from international representatives when he said that the Trump "administration has accomplished more than almost any administration in the history of the United States—"so true". Trump immediately commented that he had not expected that type of reaction.	President Trump addresses the 73rd session of the United Nations General Assembly
Wednesday, September 26	President Trump holds bilateral meetings with Israeli Prime Minister Benjamin Netanyahu, Japanese Prime Minister Shinzō Abe, and British Prime Minister Theresa May at the UN General Assembly in New York City.; Michael Avenatti tweets the details of a third accusation against Brett Kavanaugh.	Video of President Trump's Press Conference
Thursday, September 27	President Trump visits the United States Mission to the United Nations.; The Senate Judiciary Committee holds a hearing in which Professor Christine Blasey Ford and Supreme Court nominee Brett Kavanaugh are questioned about Ford's allegations.	
Friday, September 28	President Trump holds a bilateral meeting with Chilean President Sebastián Piñera at the White House.	President Trump and Chilean President Sebastián Piñera
Saturday, September 29		
Sunday, September 30		

== See also ==
- First 100 days of the first Trump presidency – Period from January to April 2017
- List of executive actions by Donald Trump
- Lists of presidential trips made by Donald Trump (international trips)
- First presidential transition of Donald Trump – Transfer of presidential power from Barack Obama to Donald Trump
- Timeline of the 2016 United States presidential election

U.S. presidential administration timelines
Preceded by First Trump presidency (2018 Q2)	First Trump presidency (2018 Q3)	Succeeded by First Trump presidency (2018 Q4)
