= Timeline of the first Trump presidency (2018 Q4) =

The following is a timeline of the first presidency of Donald Trump during the fourth and last quarter of 2018, from October 1 to December 31, 2018. For a complete itinerary of his travels, see List of presidential trips made by Donald Trump (2018). To navigate between quarters, see timeline of the Donald Trump presidencies.

== Timeline ==
=== October 2018 ===
Date	Events	Photos/videos
Monday, October 1	President Trump announces the new USMCA trade agreement between the United States, Mexico and Canada as a renegotiation of the former North American Trade Agreement (NAFTA).	President Trump announces the new USMCA trade agreement
Tuesday, October 2	The White House corrects the official transcript from yesterday's press conference to now include his initial insult of a reporter.	
Wednesday, October 3	President Trump mocks Senate Judiciary Committee witness Christine Blasey Ford at a Mississippi campaign rally.	
Thursday, October 4		
Friday, October 5	The Senate confirms Brett Kavanaugh as an Associate Justice of the Supreme Court in a vote of 51–49.	
Saturday, October 6		
Sunday, October 7		
Monday, October 8	President Trump attends the swearing in of Brett M. Kavanaugh as an Associate Justice of the Supreme Court in an East Room of the White House ceremony.	Supreme Court Justice Brett M. Kavanaugh is sworn in, in the East Room of the White House
Tuesday, October 9	United Nations Ambassador Nikki Haley announces her resignation.	
Wednesday, October 10		
Thursday, October 11	President Trump expresses concern over the disappearance of Washington Post journalist Jamal Khashoggi from the Saudi Arabian embassy in Turkey on October 2.	
Friday, October 12		
Saturday, October 13		
Sunday, October 14		
Monday, October 15	President Trump and First Lady Melania Trump visits areas affected by Hurricane Michael in Lynn Haven, Florida.; President Trump and First Lady Melania Trump visits areas affected by Hurricane Michael in Macon, Georgia.; President Trump suggests "rogue killers" may be responsible for the murder of Jamal Khashoggi.	President Trump and First Lady Melania Trump in Lynn Haven, Florida President Trump and First Lady Melania Trump in Macon, Georgia
Tuesday, October 16		
Wednesday, October 17	President Trump says the U.S. is requesting that Turkey provide audio and video relating to missing Saudi journalist Jamal Khashoggi, "if it exists".; Donald McGahn resigns as White House Chief Counsel. He will be replaced by Patrick Cipollone.	
Thursday, October 18		
Friday, October 19	President Trump holds a rally in Mesa, Arizona.	
Saturday, October 20		
Sunday, October 21		
Monday, October 22	President Trump attends a political rally at the Toyota Center in Houston, Texas, and claims "I'm a nationalist."	
Tuesday, October 23		
Wednesday, October 24	President Trump and the White House condemn as "alleged violent attacks" a number of packages containing "potential explosive devices" that were addressed to various Democrats and intercepted by the Secret Service.	
Thursday, October 25		
Friday, October 26	President Trump attends a political rally in Charlotte, North Carolina.	
Saturday, October 27		
Sunday, October 28	President Trump and First Lady Melania Trump participate in the White House Halloween event.	President Trump and First Lady Melania Trump greet trick-or-treaters during the White House Halloween event
Monday, October 29		
Tuesday, October 30		
Wednesday, October 31		

=== November 2018 ===
Date	Events	Photos/videos
Thursday, November 1		
Friday, November 2	President Trump attends a campaign rally in Indianapolis, Indiana.	
Saturday, November 3	President Trump attends a campaign rally at Bozeman Yellowstone International Airport in Belgrade, Montana.	
Sunday, November 4		
Monday, November 5	President Trump visits Ohio, Indiana and Missouri to campaign on the eve of the midterm elections.	
Tuesday, November 6	The midterm elections are held with the Republicans maintains control of the Senate while Democrats gain control of the House of Representatives. Gains in the House of Representatives give Democrats the majority, and the ability to control committees to investigate President Trump and his administration beginning in January 2019.	
Wednesday, November 7	Attorney General Jeff Sessions resigns at the request of President Trump and is replaced by Matthew Whitaker, Sessions' Chief of Staff.; President Trump suspends the access pass of CNN journalist Jim Acosta after he continues to ask questions and refuses to give up the microphone.	Press conference with Jim Acosta, November 7
Thursday, November 8		
Friday, November 9	President Trump travels to France aboard Air Force One.; President Trump receives a call from British prime minister Theresa May, whom he berates over Iran and Brexit.	
Saturday, November 10	President Trump holds a bilateral meeting with French president Emmanuel Macron at the Élysée Palace.; President Trump fails to attend a ceremony at the Aisne Marine American Cemetery in France. He cites poor weather grounding his helicopter, and a desire not to disrupt traffic with his potential motorcade.	President Trump and French President Emmanuel Macron
Sunday, November 11	President Trump attends a ceremony at the Arc de Triomphe with 60 other world leaders marking the 100th anniversary of the end of World War I. French president Emmanuel Macron delivers a speech in which he denounces nationalism as a betrayal of patriotism and warns against 'old demons coming back to wreak chaos and death'. This is seen as a rebuke of President Trump and Russian president Vladimir Putin, who is also in attendance.; President Trump fails to attend the inaugural Paris Peace Forum with European leaders, instead visiting the Suresnes American Cemetery and Memorial.; President Trump returns to Washington where he again misses a ceremony at Arlington National Cemetery marking the 100th anniversary of the end of World War I claiming he was unable to do so because he was "extremely busy on calls for the country".	Armistice Day ceremony in Paris
Monday, November 12		
Tuesday, November 13		
Wednesday, November 14	Media reports that President Trump has been in a bad mood since the midterm elections due to the significant Republican losses and is planning to shuffle his staff including Secretary of Homeland Security Kirstjen Nielsen and White House Chief of Staff John Kelly.; President Trump announces support for the FIRST STEP Act, a bipartisan legislative package of sentencing and prison overhaul measures.	
Thursday, November 15		
Friday, November 16		
Saturday, November 17	President Trump visits California to tour the devastation caused by the 2018 California wildfires. He mistakenly refers to the fire ravaged area as "Pleasure" rather than Paradise.	President Trump in Paradise, California
Sunday, November 18	President Trump sits for an interview on Fox News Sunday with Chris Wallace.	
Monday, November 19	President Trump criticizes Admiral William McRaven, a Navy Seal and former head of Special Operations Command for not killing Osama bin Laden sooner.; First Lady Melania Trump welcomes the arrival of the 2018 White House Christmas Tree.	
Tuesday, November 20	President Trump and First Lady Melania Trump participate in the National Thanksgiving Turkey Presentation.; President Trump issues a statement called extraordinary and remarkable by the media, declaring unwavering loyalty to Saudi Arabia despite its killing of Khashoggi.; Details emerge of attempts by President Trump to order the Justice Department to prosecute his political enemies, 2016 presidential election opponent Hillary Clinton and former FBI Director James Comey.; President Trump's lawyers hand in his responses to questions for the Mueller investigation.; President Trump defends Ivanka Trump's use of personal email for official government business declining to acknowledge hypocrisy given his calls for Hillary Clinton to be imprisoned for her use of personal emails during her time as Secretary of State.; United States Court of Appeals for the Ninth Circuit, based in San Francisco, rules against President Trump's immigration policy. The president lashes out against the court calling it 'a lawless disgrace' and threatening unspecified retaliation. Chief Justice John G. Roberts issues a rare statement defending the impartiality of courts.	President Trump and First Lady Melania Trump pardon a turkey named “Peas”
Wednesday, November 21	President Trump fires back at Chief Justice Roberts on Twitter.	
Thursday, November 22	President Trump spends Thanksgiving at his Mar-a-Lago estate, visiting a Coast Guard station in Palm Beach. He uses calls to overseas troops to vent on immigration and trade and to boast about his own success in a break from non-partisan traditions of such calls.; President Trump authorizes troops stationed at the U.S.–Mexican border to use lethal force if deemed necessary and also threatens to close the entire southern border with Mexico.; President Trump rebuffs the CIA for concluding that the Saudi crown prince was responsible for the killing of Jamal Khashoggi.	
Friday, November 23	The New York Supreme Court rejects a motion by President Trump to have New York State Attorney General's lawsuit against the Trump Foundation dismissed, allowing the case to proceed. The motion was made on the basis of presidential immunity and political bias.	
Saturday, November 24		
Sunday, November 25	U.S. Customs and Border Protection temporarily close all vehicle and pedestrian traffic at the major San Ysidro port of entry between Tijuana, Mexico and San Diego, California and used tear gas on migrants and refugees who approached the border fence.	
Monday, November 26	First Lady Melania Trump unveils the Christmas decorations at the White House for the second time.; President Trump and Vice President Pence speak in Tupelo and Biloxi, Mississippi, rallies in support of Senator Cindy Hyde-Smith in the lead up to her run-off election.; President Trump defends the use of 'very safe tear gas' against migrants.	First Lady Melania Trump unveils the 2018 Christmas decorations President Trump speaks to the press before flying to Mississippi
Tuesday, November 27		Briefing with Press Secretary Sarah Sanders
Wednesday, November 28	President Trump uses his Twitter account to retweet an image calling for his political opponents to be imprisoned for treason. The image includes Rod Rosenstein, his own Deputy Attorney General, and Robert Mueller.	
Thursday, November 29	President Trump travels to Buenos Aires, Argentina, ahead of the G20 summit. He abruptly cancels a meeting with Russian president Vladimir Putin over Moscow's capture of Ukrainian ships and sailors.; President Trump's long time lawyer and fixer Michael Cohen pleads guilty to lying to Congress in relation to the Mueller Russia investigation. Trump makes a statement to the media that Cohen was lying to reduce his prison sentence. He further states that there was nothing wrong with his involvement with an ultimately unsuccessful personal business deal with Russia during the 2016 presidential election.	
Friday, November 30	President Trump attends the G20 summit hosted by Argentine President Mauricio Macri.; President Trump signs the United States–Mexico–Canada Agreement (USMCA) along with Canadian prime minister Justin Trudeau and Mexican president Enrique Peña Nieto.; President Trump holds bilateral meetings with Argentine President Mauricio Macri, Australian prime minister Scott Morrison, Indian prime minister Narendra Modi, Japanese prime minister Shinzō Abe and South Korean president Moon Jae-in.	G-20 leaders at the 2018 Buenos Aires Summit

=== December 2018 ===
Date	Events	Photos/videos
Saturday, December 1	President Trump releases a statement on the death of former president George H. W. Bush and declares December 5, 2018, as a national day of mourning.; President Trump holds bilateral meetings with German chancellor Angela Merkel and Turkish president Recep Tayyip Erdoğan.; President Trump holds a bilateral meeting and dinner with Chinese president Xi Jinping, claiming they have reached an agreement to halt the escalating trade war between the United States and China. The following Tuesday senior officials play down expectations and acknowledged that key provisions were not finalized. Trump tweets that he is a "Tariff Man", causing stock markets to plunge three percent.	President Trump and Chinese President Xi Jinping
Sunday, December 2		
Monday, December 3	In a series of tweets, President Trump calls for harsh sentencing of Michael Cohen, following a guilty plea in cooperation with the Mueller investigation. The president also praises longtime associate Roger Stone for not cooperating with Mueller.; President Trump and First Lady Melania Trump visit the body of late former president George H. W. Bush, lying in state at the Capitol Rotunda, to pay their respects.	President Trump and First Lady Melania Trump pay their respects to former President George H. W. Bush
Tuesday, December 4	Senate leaders attend a closed-door security briefing by CIA Director Gina Haspel and emerge from the meeting to effectively accuse President Trump of misleading the country over the killing of Jamal Khashoggi.; President Trump and First Lady Melania Trump visit former president George W. Bush and former First Lady Laura Bush at the Blair House, to offer their condolences to the Bush family.; Robert Mueller files court documents for the sentencing of President Trump's former national security adviser, General Michael Flynn. Mueller recommends no jail time based on Flynn's assistance, including in the Trump-Russia investigation and several ongoing investigations.	President Trump and First Lady Melania Trump offer their condolences to former President George W. Bush and former First Lady Laura Bush
Wednesday, December 5	President Trump and First Lady Melania Trump attend the funeral of late former president George H. W. Bush at Washington National Cathedral.; The Washington Post reports that Saudi lobbyists paid for 500 rooms in President Trump's Washington DC Hotel following the 2016 election.	President Trump and First Lady Melania Trump at the funeral of former President George H. W. Bush
Thursday, December 6	President Trump's former Secretary of State Rex Tillerson makes public comments criticizing Trump. Trump responds the following day with an attack on Twitter calling Tillerson 'lazy' and 'dumb as a rock'.	
Friday, December 7	President Trump indicates that he will nominate William Barr for the post of Attorney General. Barr previously served as Attorney General under President George H. W. Bush from 1991 to 1993. He also indicates that he will nominate Heather Nauert as Ambassador to the United Nations.	
Saturday, December 8	President Trump announces his nomination of General Mark A. Milley as the next Chairman of the Joint Chiefs of Staff, against the recommendations of Mattis and outgoing Chairman Joseph Dunford.; President Trump takes part in the coin toss for his first Army–Navy Game as commander-in-chief.	
Sunday, December 9		
Monday, December 10		
Tuesday, December 11	President Trump meets with Democratic Party congressional leaders Nancy Pelosi and Chuck Schumer in the Oval Office. The meeting is combative, with the president threatening to shut down the government over funding for the Mexican border wall. President Trump declares that he would be "proud" to shut down parts of the government if it were to result in a border wall.	President Trump with Nancy Pelosi and Chuck Schumer
Wednesday, December 12	President Trump names Mick Mulvaney, his budget director, as acting Chief of Staff following the departure of John Kelly.; Michael Cohen, President Trump's former personal lawyer, is sentenced to three years in prison for tax evasion, violation of campaign finance laws and deceiving banks and Congress.	
Thursday, December 13	Federal prosecutors continue to investigate irregularities by the 2017 Presidential Inaugural Committee.	
Friday, December 14		
Saturday, December 15	Interior Secretary Ryan Zinke tenders his resignation letter, effective January 2, 2019.	
Sunday, December 16		
Monday, December 17		
Tuesday, December 18	President Trump agrees to shut down the Donald J. Trump Foundation following an investigation by New York State Attorney General Barbara Underwood which found "a shocking pattern of illegality involving the Trump Foundation—including unlawful coordination with the Trump presidential campaign, repeated and willful self-dealing, and much more".; President Trump's Justice Department announces that it will ban bump stocks.; President Trump abandons demands for funding for his border wall, drawing unprecedented criticism from his conservative media allies.	
Wednesday, December 19	President Trump reassures victory over ISIS in Syria and announces that U.S. troops will be returned. Aides, officials and allies are blindsided by the decision, which is made without any consultation.; A federal judge blocks the Trump Administration attempts to deny asylum to domestic violence victims.	
Thursday, December 20	Secretary of Defense Jim Mattis announces his resignation, effective February 28, 2019, with a rebuke of President Trump's foreign policy.; President Trump announces that he intends to significantly reduce troop numbers in Afghanistan. As with the previous announcement, consultation is negligible.; President Trump reverses again on a federal government shutdown over his border wall, vowing he will not sign any budget extension bill that does not fund the wall. The Senate and House are in stalemate with the former voting for no funding and the latter voting for funding for the wall.; North Korea announces that it will not eliminate its nuclear weapons unless the U.S. first removes nuclear weapons and forces from the region. North Korea further accuses President Trump of twisting the agreement made between himself and Kim Jong-un in Singapore on June 22, 2018.	
Friday, December 21	President Trump signs the First Step Act into law. The act is a bipartisan prison and sentencing reform bill with strong bipartisan support.; CNN reports that President Trump has twice lashed out at acting attorney general Matthew Whitaker over the prosecution of his former lawyer and fixer Michael Cohen, further reporting that these events underscore the extent to which the president firmly believes the attorney general of the United States should serve as his personal protector.	
Saturday, December 22	A government shutdown begins following the failure of Congress and President Trump to reach a compromise on border wall funding.; Brett McGurk, special presidential envoy for the Global Coalition to Counter the Islamic State of Iraq and the Levant, resigns effective December 31, 2018, in protest at President Trump's decision to pull American troops from Syria. In response, President Trump wrote that he did not know McGurk and questioned if McGurk was a "grandstander".	
Sunday, December 23	President Trump has Secretary of State Mike Pompeo tell Secretary of Defense James Mattis that his departure would be effective January 1. He announces Patrick M. Shanahan as acting defense secretary.; While on vacation in Cabo San Lucas, Mexico, Secretary Mnuchin conducts a series of individual calls with the CEO's of America's six largest banks, to affirm adequate liquidity and respond to market volatility.; Day 2 of the partial government shutdown	
Monday, December 24	President Trump attacks the Federal Reserve via Twitter, saying they are the only problem in the economy, which is in a significant downturn. Recent reporting has claimed that the president is seeking to fire the head of the Federal Reserve for raising interest rates.; President Trump and First Lady Melania Trump take calls in the White House for the NORAD Santa tracker. Trump draws significant media attention when he questions a 7-year-old caller's belief in Santa.; Day 3 of the partial government shutdown	President Trump and First Lady Melania Trump participate in the NORAD Santa tracker Calls
Tuesday, December 25	President Trump spends Christmas with First Lady Melania Trump at the White House, choosing not to travel to Florida during the government shutdown.; Day 4 of the partial government shutdown	
Wednesday, December 26	President and First Lady Trump make an unannounced Christmas visit to Al Asad Airbase in Iraq.; President and First Lady Trump visit American troops stationed at Ramstein Air Base in Germany.; Day 5 of the partial government shutdown	President Trump and First Lady Melania Trump visit American troops in Iraq
Thursday, December 27	Day 6 of the partial government shutdown	
Friday, December 28	Day 7 of the partial government shutdown	
Saturday, December 29	Day 8 of the partial government shutdown	
Sunday, December 30	Day 9 of the partial government shutdown	
Monday, December 31	Day 10 of the partial government shutdown	

== See also ==
- First 100 days of the first Trump presidency – Period from January to April 2017
- List of executive actions by Donald Trump
- Lists of presidential trips made by Donald Trump (international trips)
- First presidential transition of Donald Trump – Transfer of presidential power from Barack Obama to Donald Trump
- Timeline of the 2016 United States presidential election

U.S. presidential administration timelines
Preceded by First Trump presidency (2018 Q3)	First Trump presidency (2018 Q4)	Succeeded by First Trump presidency (2019 Q1)
