= Harold Bornstein =

American gastroenterologist (1947–2021)

- Bornstein in 2016
- Born: Harold Nelson Bornstein; March 26, 1947; New York City, U.S.
- Died: January 8, 2021 (aged 73)
- Education: Tufts University (BS, MD)
- Occupations: Physician; gastroenterologist
- Known for: Donald Trump's personal physician
- Spouse(s): Cynthia Ewing Callachan (m. 1981, divorced) Melissa Brown
- Children: 5

Harold Nelson Bornstein (March 26, 1947 – January 8, 2021) was an American gastroenterologist and Donald Trump's personal physician. Bornstein was Donald Trump's personal physician from 1980 until early 2018; before then, Bornstein's father was his personal physician.

== Early life ==
Harold Nelson Bornstein was born on March 3, 1947 in New York City to Jacob, a physician, and Maida (née Seltzer) Bornstein. Bornstein received his M.D. degree from Tufts University in 1975 and had been licensed to practice medicine in New York State since 1976. He was certified by the American Board of Internal Medicine as a specialist in internal medicine (1978) and gastroenterology (1983).

He ultimately joined his father's practice and was on staff at Lenox Hill Hospital.

== Trump's personal physician role ==
In December 2015 in response to questions about his health, Trump asked Bornstein to issue a "full medical report", predicting that it would show "perfection". Two days later Bornstein signed a letter full of superlatives, saying that Trump's "laboratory results are astonishingly excellent" and that Trump "will be the healthiest individual ever elected to the presidency." In August 2016, Bornstein stated that he had written the letter in five minutes while Trump's limousine waited for it. But he reiterated that Trump's "health is excellent, especially his mental health."

In May 2018 Bornstein said that, in fact, Trump had dictated the letter over the telephone, then sent a car to pick it up. Bornstein said in an interview with CNN that "Mr. Trump dictated the letter and I would tell him what he couldn't put in there..."

Speaking to The New York Times in February 2017, Bornstein revealed that he was invited to and attended President Trump's inauguration with his wife Melissa. Bornstein told The Times that he enjoyed the attention from being known as the President's personal physician. According to Stat, Bornstein had hoped to be the physician to the president, but the White House decided that Ronny Jackson would continue in that role.

On May 1, 2018, Bornstein told NBC News that three Trump representatives had "raided" his office on February 3, 2017, taking all of Trump's medical records. Bornstein said he felt "raped, frightened and sad" over the event. He identified two of the men as Trump's longtime bodyguard Keith Schiller and the Trump Organization's chief legal officer Alan Garten. Two days earlier, Bornstein had told a reporter that Trump took a prescription hair growth medicine, Propecia, after which Trump cut ties with him.

== Personal life and death ==
Bornstein was Jewish and lived in Scarsdale, New York. Bornstein was married three times: in 1981, Bornstein married his second wife Cynthia Ewing Callachan, in a ceremony officiated by the Protestant chaplain of Yale University, and he was most recently married to Melissa Brown. The New York Times described Bornstein as "loquacious, hirsute and eccentric".

Bornstein died on January 8, 2021 at the age of 73. The place and cause of death were not disclosed. He was surrounded by his wife, Melissa, and five children.
