= Keith Schiller =

American law enforcement official (born 1959)

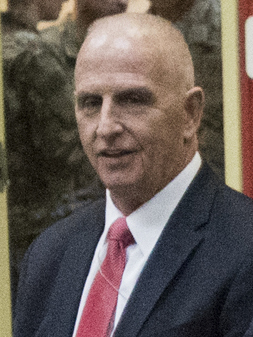

Director of Oval Office Operations
- In office January 20, 2017 – September 20, 2017
- President: Donald Trump
- Preceded by: Brian Mosteller
- Succeeded by: Jordan Karem

Personal details
- Born: 1959 (age 66–67) New York City, New York, U.S.
- Party: Republican
- Spouse: Lena Schiller
- Children: 2

Military service
- Branch/service: United States Navy
- Years of service: 1978–1982
- Rank: Radioman

Keith Schiller (born c. 1959) is an American former law enforcement official and security consultant who served as Deputy Assistant to U.S. President Donald Trump and Director of Oval Office Operations. Prior to his appointment in the Trump administration, Schiller served as the director of security for The Trump Organization. In that capacity, he was the personal bodyguard to Trump. He has been described as "one of Trump's most loyal and trusted aides" and "a constant presence at Trump's side for nearly two decades."

== Early life and military service ==
Born in The Bronx the middle child of five, Schiller was raised in the Hudson Valley region; he graduated from New Paltz High School in 1977.

=== United States Navy ===
Schiller joined the United States Navy after graduating from high school. He primarily served at the Little Creek base in Norfolk, Virginia, and was also the boarding team leader on the USS Plymouth Rock, a landing ship for amphibious vehicles. After serving on the Special Boat Teams, he left active duty in 1982 and spent another two years in the reserve, serving until 1984.

== Career ==
=== Plattekill Police Department and New York State Division for Youth ===
After leaving the navy in 1984, Schiller returned to New York. In the same year, he found work as a counselor in the New York State Division for Youth (after volunteering as a counselor through his church) and concurrently served as a police officer at the Plattekill Police Department, holding those two jobs until 1992.

=== New York City Police Department ===
In 1992, Schiller was hired by the New York City Police Department (NYPD) and worked there for twelve years; he began as a transit officer. He graduated from the New York City Police Academy, and served as a patrol officer in northern Manhattan which at the time was the epicenter of the cocaine trade. After a brief stint as an undercover officer, Schiller joined the Street Narcotics Enforcement Unit with the 34th Precinct, where he was the rammer (charged with breaking the door during raids). He described his job as "busting into drug houses up to three times a night". He also spent time in the high-intensity drug-trafficking area working under then-Lieutenant David E. Chong, who describes Schiller as a "devoted, physical and loyal officer" who "always had his boss's back". During his career at the department he was a narcotics officer with the NYPD Strike Force, and the High Intensity Drug Trafficking Area program of New York and New Jersey.

Schiller regularly handled wiretaps, search warrants, and large-scale seizures of drugs.

=== Trump Organization and White House ===
In 1999, Schiller saw Marla Maples, Donald Trump's then-wife, at the Manhattan District Attorney's office accompanied by a bodyguard, whom Schiller judged as not being particularly imposing. Seeking side work to supplement his NYPD salary, Schiller asked the assistant district attorney to put in a good word with Trump, so that he could be employed as a bodyguard. The Trump Organization eventually brought him on for a one-month trial and later that year hired him officially. Schiller remained a part-time bodyguard until he retired from the NYPD in 2002. In 2004, Trump promoted him to be his director of security.

Schiller made headlines in 2015 when he hit a protester outside Trump Tower.

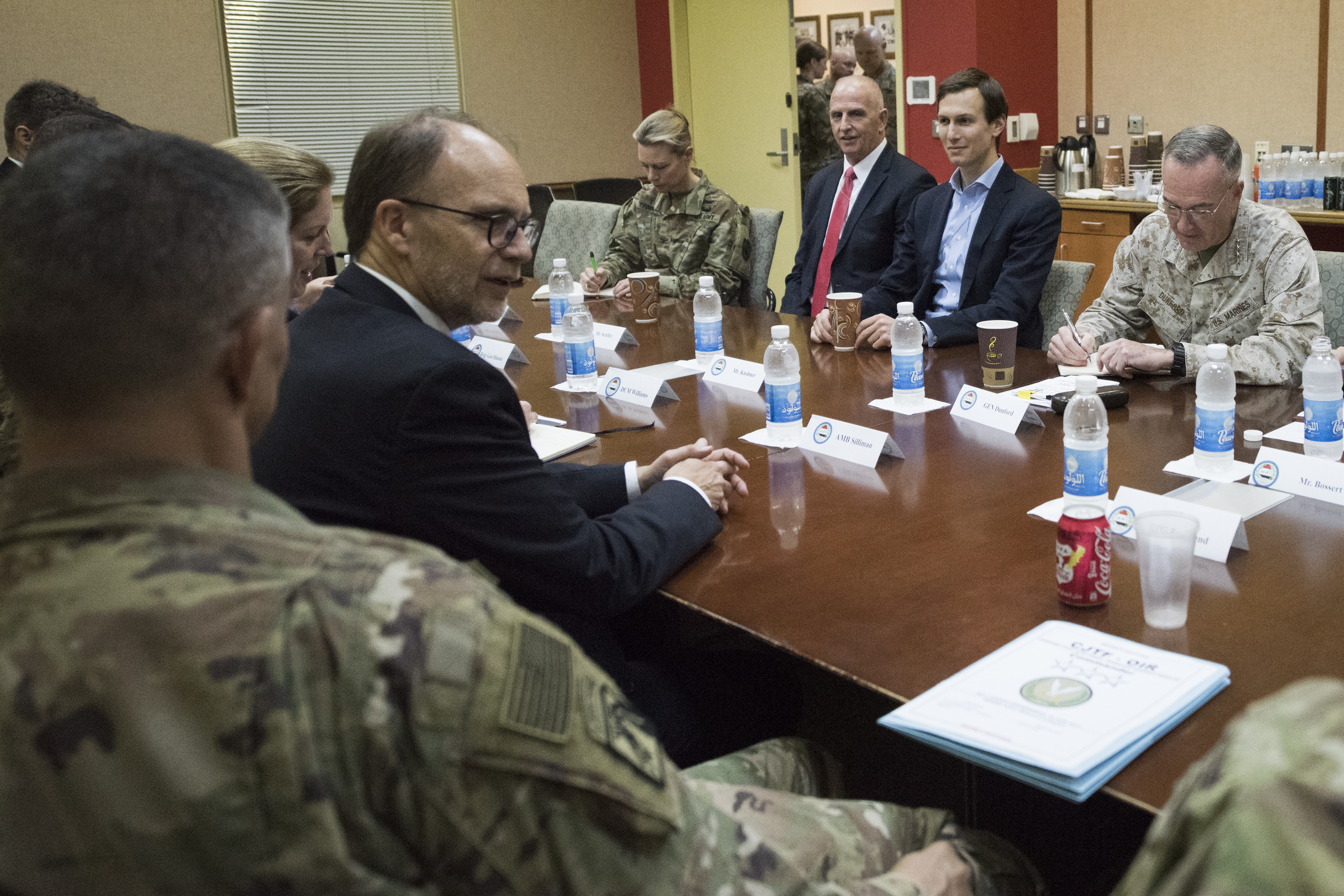
Keith Schiller sitting to the right of Jared Kushner on his trip to Iraq

He was appointed Deputy Assistant to the President and Director of Oval Office Operations after Trump became president in January 2017. On February 3, 2017, he, attorney Alan Garten who was the Trump Organization chief legal officer at the time, and another large man allegedly were involved in a raid of President Trump's medical records from the office of Dr. Harold Bornstein, who was Trump's longtime personal physician, and allegedly improperly obtained President Trump's medical records by not having a signed HIPAA release form for the records, which violates patient privacy laws. He accompanied Jared Kushner to Iraq and sat in on meetings, and became known as a Trump fixer. Schiller was selected by Trump to personally deliver to FBI headquarters the letter telling FBI director James Comey that he was being dismissed "effective immediately"; Comey was not present at the time, learning of his firing from television reports while in Los Angeles.

A week later, Schiller unintentionally exposed Secretary of Defense James Mattis' cell phone number when a photograph of Schiller carrying papers with the handwritten number on a sticky note was published in The Washington Post.

On September 1, 2017, it was reported by CNN that Schiller intended to leave his White House position in late September or early October due to financial considerations. Although White House Press Secretary Sarah Huckabee Sanders dismissed the story as "not true"; the next day, CBS News correspondent Major Garrett cited "two White House sources" as confirming that Schiller indeed planned to leave the White House and relocate to Florida for financial and professional reasons. Three people close to Schiller, speaking on background, also confirmed reports of his impending departure to The New York Times White House correspondent Maggie Haberman. Schiller refused to comment on the accuracy of the report, in keeping with his policy of declining interviews with journalists.

Schiller left his White House position on September 20, 2017, reportedly after White House Chief of Staff John F. Kelly told him he needed permission to speak to the president and to provide written reports of those conversations. Previously, Bloomberg had reported that Schiller would return to private security when he left the Trump Administration.

On November 1, 2017, Schiller was named as one of several high-profile witnesses who would be privately interviewed by the House Intelligence Committee as part of its Russia investigations. The interview was on November 7 and reportedly he told the committee that the salacious allegations in the Donald Trump-Russia dossier were not true. He also was said to say he could not recall or was not aware of links between Trump associates and Russian officials. He testified that a Russian offered to send five women to Trump's hotel room during their 2013 trip to Moscow for the Miss Universe pageant but he rejected the offer. "One source noted that Schiller testified he eventually left Trump's hotel room door and could not say for sure what happened during the remainder of the night."

=== Republican National Committee ===
After Schiller left the White House in October 2017, his security company, KS Global Group LLC, was hired by the Republican National Committee to provide security consultation relating to the committee's 2020 convention.

He was married to his wife, Lena, who died from an autoimmune disease. They had two children.

=== Donald Trump hush money trial ===
On May 7, 2024, Stormy Daniels testified that Schiller approached her in 2006, to invite her to dinner with Trump. Daniels alleges that she had a sexual encounter with Trump later that day.
