= 2018 opinion polling on the Trump administration =

Surveying on 2017–2021 US presidency

This is a list of opinion polls taken on the First presidency of Donald Trump in 2018.

== December ==
Area polled	Segment polled	Polling group	Date	Approve	Disapprove	Unsure	Sample size	Polling method	Source(s)
United States	All adults	YouGov (for The Economist)	December 23–25, 2018	43%	50%	8%	1,500	online	
United States	All adults	Gallup	December 17–22, 2018	39%	55%	---	1,500	telephone	
United States	All adults	American Research Group	December 17–20, 2018	40%	57%	3%	1,100	telephone	
United States	All adults	YouGov (for The Economist)	December 16–18, 2018	41%	50%	9%	1,500	online	
United States	All adults	Ipsos (for Reuters)	December 12–18, 2018	43%	52%	5%	2,201	online	
United States	Registered voters	Quinnipiac University	December 12–17, 2018	39%	52%	8%	1,147	telephone	
United States	Registered voters	Suffolk University/USA Today	December 11–16, 2018	42%	54%	4%	1,000	telephone	
United States	All adults	Gallup	December 10–16, 2018	38%	57%	---	1,500	telephone	
United States	All adults	NBC News/The Wall Street Journal	December 9–12, 2018	43%	54%	3%	900	telephone	
United States	Registered voters	Fox News	December 9–11, 2018	46%	52%	2%	1,006	telephone	
United States	All adults	YouGov (for The Economist)	December 9–11, 2018	43%	49%	9%	1,500	online	
United States	All adults	Ipsos (for Reuters)	December 5–11, 2018	43%	52%	5%	2,257	online	
United States	All adults	CNN	December 6–9, 2018	39%	52%	9%	1,015	telephone	
United States	All adults	Gallup	December 3–9, 2018	40%	56%	---	1,500	telephone	
United States	All adults	CNBC	December 3–6, 2018	41%	47%	12%	802	telephone	
Tennessee	Registered voters	Vanderbilt University	November 19 – December 6, 2018	52%	44%	3%	1,004	telephone	
United States	All adults	YouGov (for The Economist)	December 2–4, 2018	43%	48%	8%	1,500	online	
United States	All adults	NPR/PBS NewsHour/Marist	November 28 – December 4, 2018	42%	49%	9%	1,075	telephone	
United States	All adults	Ipsos (for Reuters)	November 28 – December 4, 2018	41%	52%	6%	2,401	online	
United States	All adults	Gallup	November 26 – December 2, 2018	40%	56%	---	1,500	telephone	
United States	All adults	Investor's Business Daily	November 26 – December 2, 2018	39%	55%	2%	823	telephone	

majority approve plurality approve majority disapprove plurality disapprove

== November ==
Area polled	Segment polled	Polling group	Date	Approve	Disapprove	Unsure	Sample size	Polling method	Source(s)
Virginia	Registered voters	Christopher Newport University	November 14–30, 2018	35%	57%	8%	841	telephone	
United States	All adults	YouGov (for The Economist)	November 25–27, 2018	40%	52%	9%	1,500	online	
United States	All adults	Grinnell College	November 24–27, 2018	43%	45%	12%	1,000	telephone	
United States	All adults	Ipsos (for Reuters)	November 21–27, 2018	44%	51%	6%	2,289	online	
United States	All adults	Gallup	November 18–25, 2018	38%	60%	---	1,500	telephone	
United States	All adults	YouGov (for The Economist)	November 18–20, 2018	40%	49%	11%	1,500	online	
United States	All adults	American Research Group	November 17–20, 2018	42%	55%	3%	1,100	telephone	
United States	All adults	Ipsos (for Reuters)	November 14–20, 2018	44%	51%	5%	2,232	online	
California	All adults	Public Policy Institute of California	November 11–20, 2018	32%	63%	5%	1,678	telephone	
United States	All adults	Kaiser Family Foundation	November 14–19, 2018	37%	58%	5%	1,201	telephone	
United States	Registered voters	Quinnipiac University	November 14–19, 2018	41%	54%	6%	1,046	telephone	
United States	All adults	CBS News	November 15–18, 2018	39%	55%	6%	1,103	telephone	
United States	All adults	Gallup	November 12–18, 2018	43%	53%	---	1,500	telephone	
United States	All adults	YouGov (for The Economist)	November 11–13, 2018	41%	51%	8%	1,500	online	
United States	All adults	Pew Research Center	November 7–13, 2018	41%	58%	1%	9,451	telephone and online	
United States	All adults	Ipsos (for Reuters)	November 7–13, 2018	43%	53%	4%	2,149	online	
United States	All adults	Monmouth University	November 9–12, 2018	43%	49%	8%	802	telephone	
United States	All adults	Gallup	November 5–11, 2018	38%	56%	---	1,500	telephone	
United States	All adults	YouGov (for The Economist)	November 4–6, 2018	40%	49%	11%	1,500	online	
United States	All adults	Gallup	October 29 – November 4, 2018	40%	54%	---	1,500	telephone	
United States	All adults	CNN	November 1–3, 2018	39%	55%	6%	1,518	telephone	
United States	Likely voters	NBC News/The Wall Street Journal	November 1–3, 2018	46%	52%	2%	1,000	telephone	
United States	All adults	Investor's Business Daily	October 25 – November 3, 2018	40%	53%	3%	900	telephone	
Florida	Likely voters	NBC News/Marist	October 30 – November 2, 2018	44%	51%	5%	595	telephone	
United States	All adults	ABC News/The Washington Post	October 29 – November 1, 2018	40%	53%	8%	1,255	telephone	
Pennsylvania	Likely voters	The Morning Call/Muhlenberg College	October 28 – November 1, 2018	43%	52%	6%	421	telephone	
North Carolina	Registered voters	High Point University#HPU Poll/High Point University	October 26 – November 1, 2018	42%	50%	8%	680	telephone and online	

majority approve plurality approve majority disapprove plurality disapprove

== October ==
Area polled	Segment polled	Polling group	Date	Approve	Disapprove	Unsure	Sample size	Polling method	Source(s)
Connecticut	Likely voters	Sacred Heart University/Hearst Connecticut Media Group	October 29–31, 2018	38%	57%	5%	500	telephone	
United States	All adults	YouGov (for The Economist)	October 28–30, 2018	40%	52%	9%	1,500	online	
Tennessee	Likely voters	Fox News	October 27–30, 2018	58%	39%	3%	718	telephone	
United States	All adults	Ipsos (for Reuters)	October 24–30, 2018	41%	53%	6%	2,574	online	
United States	All adults	NPR/PBS NewsHour/Marist	October 28–29, 2018	41%	51%	8%	924	telephone	
Wisconsin	Likely voters	Marquette University Law School	October 24–28, 2018	47%	52%	1%	1,154	telephone	
United States	All adults	Gallup	October 22–28, 2018	40%	54%	---	1,500	telephone	
Massachusetts	Likely voters	Suffolk University/The Boston Globe	October 24–27, 2018	33%	65%	2%	500	telephone	
Arizona	Likely voters	NBC News/Marist	October 23–27, 2018	44%	49%	7%	506	telephone	
Florida	Likely voters	University of North Florida	October 23–26, 2018	45%	51%	4%	1,039	telephone	
United States	All adults	NPR/PBS NewsHour/Marist	October 21–23, 2018	39%	53%	8%	935	telephone	
United States	All adults	YouGov (for The Economist)	October 21–23, 2018	42%	50%	9%	1,500	online	
United States	All adults	Ipsos (for Reuters)	October 17–23, 2018	41%	53%	6%	3,867	online	
United States	Likely voters	Suffolk University/USA Today	October 18–22, 2018	43%	54%	3%	1,000	telephone	
United States	All adults	Gallup	October 15–21, 2018	44%	50%	---	1,500	telephone	
California	All adults	Public Policy Institute of California	October 12–21, 2018	29%	64%	7%	1,685	telephone	
United States	All adults	American Research Group	October 17–20, 2018	42%	55%	3%	1,100	telephone	
Florida	Likely voters	CNN	October 16–20, 2018	43%	51%	6%	759	telephone	
New Jersey	Likely voters	Rutgers University	October 12–19, 2018	41%	56%	3%	494	telephone	
Mississippi	All adults	NBC News/Marist	October 13–18, 2018	55%	35%	10%	973	telephone	
New Hampshire	All adults	University of New Hampshire	October 10–18, 2018	44%	50%	6%	643	telephone	
United States	Registered voters	NBC News/The Wall Street Journal	October 14–17, 2018	47%	49%	4%	900	telephone	
United States	All adults	CBS News	October 14–17, 2018	39%	53%	8%	1,108	telephone	
Connecticut	Likely voters	Sacred Heart University/Hearst Connecticut Media Group	October 13–17, 2018	35%	58%	7%	501	telephone	
United States	All adults	YouGov (for The Economist)	October 14–16, 2018	41%	48%	12%	1,500	online	
United States	Registered voters	Fox News	October 13–16, 2018	47%	51%	2%	1,007	telephone	
United States	All adults	Ipsos (for Reuters)	October 10–16, 2018	43%	52%	6%	2,237	online	
New Jersey	Likely voters	Monmouth University	October 11–15, 2018	42%	55%	4%	527	telephone	
New Hampshire	Registered voters	Saint Anselm College	October 10–15, 2018	43%	54%	3%	454	telephone	
United States	All adults	Associated Press/NORC at the University of Chicago	October 11–14, 2018	40%	59%	1%	1,152	telephone and online	
United States	All adults	Gallup	October 8–14, 2018	44%	51%	---	1,500	telephone	
Texas	Likely voters	CNN	October 9–13, 2018	49%	48%	3%	716	telephone	
Tennessee	Registered voters	Vanderbilt University	October 8–13, 2018	55%	42%	2%	800	telephone	
United States	All adults	ABC News/The Washington Post	October 8–11, 2018	41%	54%	6%	1,144	telephone	
Utah	Registered voters	The Salt Lake Tribune/Hinckley Institute of Politics	October 3–9, 2018	51%	48%	1%	607	telephone	
United States	All adults	Ipsos (for Reuters)	October 3–9, 2018	39%	55%	7%	3,708	online	
Connecticut	Likely voters	Quinnipiac University	October 3–8, 2018	39%	59%	2%	767	telephone	
United States	Registered voters	CNBC	October 4–7, 2018	41%	49%	10%	800	telephone	
United States	All adults	CNN	October 4–7, 2018	41%	52%	7%	1,009	telephone	
Wisconsin	Likely voters	Marquette University Law School	October 3–7, 2018	47%	52%	1%	799	telephone	
United States	All adults	Gallup	October 1–7, 2018	43%	53%	---	1,500	telephone	
North Carolina	All adults	High Point University#HPU Poll/High Point University	September 28 – October 7, 2018	44%	49%	7%	921	telephone and online	
United States	All adults	Pew Research Center	September 24 – October 7, 2018	38%	61%	2%	10,683	telephone and online	
Maryland	Likely voters	Gonzales Research & Media Services	October 1–6, 2018	41%	55%	4%	806	telephone	
Rhode Island	Registered voters	University of New Hampshire/Rhode Island Public Radio/The Providence Journal/ABC6	September 27 – October 6, 2018	35%	60%	5%	561	telephone	
Nevada	Likely voters	NBC News/Marist	September 30 – October 3, 2018	45%	47%	8%	574	telephone	
United States	All adults	Investor's Business Daily	September 27 – October 3, 2018	40%	54%	1%	905	telephone	
United States	All adults	YouGov (for The Economist)	September 30 – October 2, 2018	37%	52%	11%	1,500	online	
Tennessee	Likely voters	Fox News	September 29 – October 2, 2018	60%	39%	2%	666	telephone	
United States	All adults	Ipsos (for Reuters)	September 26 – October 2, 2018	40%	54%	6%	3,316	online	
New Jersey	Likely voters	Quinnipiac University	September 25 – October 2, 2018	35%	62%	3%	1,058	telephone	
United States	All adults	Kaiser Family Foundation	September 19 – October 2, 2018	40%	54%	6%	1,201	telephone	
United States	All adults	NPR/PBS NewsHour/Marist	October 1, 2018	41%	53%	5%	1,183	telephone	

majority approve plurality approve majority disapprove plurality disapprove

== September ==
Area polled	Segment polled	Polling group	Date	Approve	Disapprove	Unsure	Sample size	Polling method	Source(s)
United States	Registered voters	Quinnipiac University	September 27–30, 2018	41%	53%	6%	1,111	telephone	
New Jersey	Registered voters	Fairleigh Dickinson University	September 26–30, 2018	33%	58%	6%	746	telephone	
Missouri	Likely voters	CNN	September 25–29, 2018	51%	45%	4%	756	telephone	
New Hampshire	All adults	American Research Group	September 21–26, 2018	40%	56%	4%	897	telephone	
United States	All adults	YouGov (for The Economist)	September 23–25, 2018	40%	50%	11%	1,500	online	
United States	All adults	Ipsos (for Reuters)	September 19–25, 2018	42%	52%	6%	2,953	online	
United States	All adults	NPR/PBS NewsHour/Marist	September 22–24, 2018	42%	49%	9%	997	telephone	
Florida	Likely voters	Quinnipiac University	September 20–24, 2018	44%	54%	2%	888	telephone	
United States	All adults	Pew Research Center	September 18–24, 2018	38%	55%	7%	1,754	telephone	
United States	All adults	Gallup	September 17–23, 2018	40%	56%	---	1,500	telephone	
United States	Registered voters	Greenberg Quinlan Rosner (Democracy Corps)	September 9–23, 2018	41%	55%	3%	1,000	telephone	
Iowa	All adults	The Des Moines Register/Mediacom	September 17–20, 2018	39%	56%	5%	801	telephone	
United States	All adults	American Research Group	September 17–20, 2018	37%	59%	4%	1,100	telephone	
Florida	All adults	NBC News/Marist	September 16–20, 2018	43%	48%	9%	932	telephone	
United States	Registered voters	Fox News	September 16–19, 2018	44%	52%	3%	1,003	telephone	
United States	Registered voters	NBC News/The Wall Street Journal	September 16–19, 2018	44%	52%	4%	900	telephone	
Pennsylvania	Likely voters	The Morning Call/Muhlenberg College	September 13–19, 2018	41%	55%	4%	404	telephone	
United States	All adults	YouGov (for The Economist)	September 16–18, 2018	41%	50%	9%	1,500	online	
United States	All adults	Ipsos (for Reuters)	September 12–18, 2018	42%	54%	4%	2,215	online	
California	All adults	Public Policy Institute of California	September 9–18, 2018	30%	66%	5%	1,689	telephone	
Massachusetts	Likely voters	Suffolk University/The Boston Globe	September 13–17, 2018	22%	73%	4%	500	telephone	
Connecticut	Likely voters	Sacred Heart University/Hearst Connecticut Media	September 12–17, 2018	34%	59%	7%	501	telephone	
Wisconsin	Likely voters	Marquette University Law School	September 12–16, 2018	43%	54%	2%	614	telephone	
Maryland	All adults	Goucher College	September 11–16, 2018	23%	71%	4%	831	telephone	
United States	All adults	Gallup	September 10–16, 2018	38%	56%	---	1,500	telephone	
Tennessee	Likely voters	CNN	September 11–15, 2018	49%	48%	3%	723	telephone	
North Carolina	All adults	High Point University#HPU Poll/High Point University	September 7–13, 2018	42%	50%	8%	827	telephone and online	
New Mexico	Likely voters	Albuquerque Journal	September 7–13, 2018	38%	54%	2%	423	telephone	
Minnesota	Likely voters	Star Tribune/Minnesota Public Radio	September 10–12, 2018	39%	56%	5%	800	telephone	
United States	All adults	YouGov (for The Economist)	September 9–11, 2018	42%	48%	10%	1,500	online	
North Dakota	Likely voters	Fox News	September 8–11, 2018	54%	42%	3%	701	telephone	
United States	All adults	Ipsos (for Reuters)	September 5–11, 2018	40%	54%	6%	2,250	online	
Nevada	Likely voters	Suffolk University/Reno Gazette-Journal	September 5–10, 2018	46%	50%	4%	500	telephone	
United States	All adults	CNN	September 6–9, 2018	36%	58%	6%	1,003	telephone	
United States	Registered voters	Quinnipiac University	September 6–9, 2018	38%	54%	8%	1,038	telephone	
United States	All adults	NPR/Marist	September 5–9, 2018	39%	52%	9%	949	telephone	
Virginia	All adults	University of Mary Washington	September 4–9, 2018	37%	58%	5%	801	telephone	
United States	All adults	Gallup	September 3–9, 2018	40%	54%	---	1,500	telephone	
Michigan	Likely voters	The Detroit News/WDIV-TV	September 5–7, 2018	44%	51%	5%	600	telephone	
United States	All adults	YouGov (for The Economist)	September 2–4, 2018	38%	53%	9%	1,500	online	
United States	All adults	Ipsos (for Reuters)	August 29 – September 4, 2018	40%	54%	6%	2,386	online	
(Georgia (U.S. state)) Georgia	Likely voters	The Atlanta Journal-Constitution	August 26 – September 4, 2018	42%	51%	7%	1,020	telephone	
Florida	Likely voters	Quinnipiac University	August 30 – September 3, 2018	47%	51%	2%	785	telephone	
United States	All adults	Grinnell College	August 29 – September 2, 2018	39%	50%	11%	1,002	telephone	

majority approve plurality approve majority disapprove plurality disapprove

== August ==
Area polled	Segment polled	Polling group	Date	Approve	Disapprove	Unsure	Sample size	Polling method	Source(s)
United States	All adults	Investor's Business Daily	August 23–30, 2018	36%	56%	2%	902	telephone	
United States	All adults	ABC News/The Washington Post	August 26–29, 2018	36%	60%	4%	1,003	telephone	
United States	All adults	YouGov (for The Economist)	August 26–28, 2018	41%	48%	11%	1,500	online	
Tennessee	Likely voters	NBC News/Marist	August 25–28, 2018	47%	43%	10%	538	telephone	
United States	All adults	Kaiser Family Foundation	August 23–28, 2018	37%	59%	4%	1,201	telephone	
United States	Registered voters	Suffolk University/USA Today	August 23–28, 2018	40%	56%	4%	1,000	telephone	
United States	All adults	Gallup	August 20–26, 2018	41%	54%	---	1,500	telephone	
Wisconsin	Likely voters	Suffolk University/Milwaukee Journal Sentinel	August 18–24, 2018	41%	53%	7%	500	telephone	
United States	Registered voters	Harvard University/The Harris Poll	August 22–23, 2018	46%	54%	---	1,330	online	
United States	Registered voters	NBC News/The Wall Street Journal	August 18–22, 2018	46%	51%	3%	900	telephone	
United States	Registered voters	Fox News	August 19–21, 2018	45%	53%	2%	1,009	telephone	
United States	All adults	YouGov (for The Economist)	August 19–21, 2018	41%	49%	10%	1,500	online	
Connecticut	Likely voters	Sacred Heart University/Hearst Connecticut Media	August 16–21, 2018	31%	58%	11%	502	telephone	
Minnesota	Likely voters	Suffolk University/St. Cloud Times	August 17–20, 2018	40%	54%	6%	500	telephone	
United States	All adults	American Research Group	August 17–20, 2018	36%	59%	5%	1,100	telephone	
United States	All adults	Associated Press/NORC at the University of Chicago	August 16–20, 2018	38%	60%	1%	1,055	telephone and online	
New Jersey	Registered voters	Quinnipiac University	August 15–20, 2018	33%	63%	5%	908	telephone	
Wisconsin	Registered voters	Marquette University Law School	August 15–19, 2018	45%	51%	3%	800	telephone	
United States	All adults	Monmouth University	August 15–19, 2018	43%	50%	7%	805	telephone	
United States	All adults	Gallup	August 13–19, 2018	42%	52%	---	1,500	telephone	
Virginia	Likely voters	Roanoke College	August 12–19, 2018	32%	53%	3%	512	telephone	
New Hampshire	All adults	University of New Hampshire	August 2–19, 2018	44%	53%	3%	501	telephone	
Wisconsin	Registered voters	Public Policy Polling	August 15–16, 2018	46%	51%	3%	596	telephone and online	
Illinois	All adults	NBC News/Marist	August 12–16, 2018	31%	56%	13%	831	telephone	
United States	All adults	YouGov (for The Economist)	August 12–14, 2018	42%	49%	9%	1,500	online	
United States	All adults	Ipsos (for Reuters)	August 8–14, 2018	41%	53%	5%	2,232	online	
United States	Registered voters	Quinnipiac University	August 9–13, 2018	41%	54%	5%	1,175	telephone	
United States	All adults	CNN	August 9–12, 2018	42%	53%	5%	1,002	telephone	
United States	All adults	Pew Research Center	July 30 – August 12, 2018	40%	59%	2%	4,581	telephone and online	
Maryland	Likely voters	Gonzales Research & Media Services	August 1–8, 2018	36%	59%	5%	831	telephone	
Maine	Likely voters	Suffolk University	August 2–6, 2018	41%	55%	4%	500	telephone	
United States	All adults	Investor's Business Daily	July 26 – August 2, 2018	41%	53%	1%	929	telephone	

majority approve plurality approve majority disapprove plurality disapprove

== July ==
Area polled	Segment polled	Polling group	Date	Approve	Disapprove	Unsure	Sample size	Polling method	Source(s)
United States	All adults	NPR/PBS NewsHour/Marist	July 19–22, 2018	39%	51%	10%	1,061	telephone	
United States	All adults	Kaiser Family Foundation	July 17–22, 2018	40%	55%	5%	1,200	telephone	
United States	All adults	American Research Group	July 17–20, 2018	37%	57%	6%	1,100	telephone	
United States	All adults	NBC News/The Wall Street Journal	July 15–18, 2018	45%	52%	3%	900	telephone	
United States	All adults	YouGov (for The Economist)	July 15–17, 2018	39%	50%	11%	1,500	online	
California	All adults	Public Policy Institute of California	July 8–17, 2018	29%	66%	5%	1,689	telephone	
Wisconsin	Registered voters	Marquette University Law School	July 11–15, 2018	42%	50%	7%	800	telephone	
United States	Registered voters	Fox News	July 9–11, 2018	46%	51%	3%	1,007	telephone	
United States	All adults	YouGov (for The Economist)	July 1–3, 2018	41%	49%	10%	1,500	online	
United States	All adults	The Washington Post/Schar School of Policy and Government	June 27 – July 2, 2018	43%	55%	2%	1,473	telephone and online	
United States	Registered voters	Quinnipiac University	June 27 – July 1, 2018	40%	55%	4%	1,020	telephone	

majority approve plurality approve majority disapprove plurality disapprove

== June ==
Area polled	Segment polled	Polling group	Date	Approve	Disapprove	Unsure	Sample size	Polling method	Source(s)
United States	All adults	Investor's Business Daily	June 21–29, 2018	41%	54%	1%	900	telephone	
United States	All adults	YouGov (for The Economist)	June 24–26, 2018	38%	52%	11%	1,500	online	
United States	All adults	American Research Group	June 17–20, 2018	40%	54%	6%	1,100	telephone	
United States	All adults	YouGov (for The Economist)	June 17–19, 2018	41%	48%	11%	1,500	online	
United States	Registered voters	Suffolk University/USA Today	June 13–18, 2018	43%	51%	6%	1,000	telephone	
United States	All adults	Associated Press/NORC at the University of Chicago	June 13–18, 2018	41%	57%	---	1,109	telephone and online	
United States	Registered voters	Quinnipiac University	June 14–17, 2018	43%	52%	6%	905	telephone	
United States	All adults	CBS News	June 14–17, 2018	42%	52%	6%	1,100	telephone	
United States	All adults	CNN	June 14–17, 2018	39%	54%	7%	1,012	telephone	
Wisconsin	Registered voters	Marquette University Law School	June 13–17, 2018	44%	50%	5%	800	telephone	
United States	All adults	Gallup	June 11–17, 2018	45%	50%	---	1,500	telephone	
United States	All adults	Monmouth University	June 12–13, 2018	43%	46%	11%	806	telephone	
United States	All adults	YouGov (for The Economist)	June 10–12, 2018	42%	48%	10%	1,500	online	
Massachusetts	Likely voters	Suffolk University/The Boston Globe	June 8–12, 2018	30%	62%	7%	500	telephone	
United States	All adults	Ipsos (for Reuters)	June 8–12, 2018	41%	54%	5%	2,373	online	
Ohio	Registered voters	Quinnipiac University	June 7–12, 2018	43%	54%	3%	1,082	telephone	
United States	All adults	Pew Research Center	June 5–12, 2018	40%	54%	6%	2,002	telephone	
United States	Registered voters	Public Policy Polling	June 8–10, 2018	39%	54%	6%	679	telephone	
Maryland	Likely voters	Gonzales Research & Media Services	June 4–10, 2018	37%	61%	3%	800	telephone	
United States	All adults	Gallup	June 4–10, 2018	42%	54%	---	1,500	telephone	
United States	Registered voters	Fox News	June 3–6, 2018	45%	51%	4%	1,001	telephone	
United States	All adults	YouGov (for The Economist)	June 3–5, 2018	39%	53%	9%	1,500	online	
United States	Registered voters	Quinnipiac University	May 31 – June 5, 2018	40%	51%	8%	1,223	telephone	
United States	All adults	Investor's Business Daily	May 29 – June 5, 2018	36%	55%	2%	905	telephone	
United States	Registered voters	NBC News/The Wall Street Journal	June 1–4, 2018	44%	53%	3%	900	telephone	
Pennsylvania's 1st congressional district	Likely voters	Monmouth University	May 31 – June 3, 2018	47%	49%	3%	451	telephone	
Maryland	All adults	The Washington Post/University of Maryland	May 29 – June 3, 2018	28%	68%	4%	1,015	telephone	
United States	All adults	Gallup	May 28 – June 3, 2018	41%	55%	---	1,500	telephone	

majority approve plurality approve majority disapprove plurality disapprove

== May ==
Area polled	Segment polled	Polling group	Date	Approve	Disapprove	Unsure	Sample size	Polling method	Source(s)
California's 49th congressional district	Likely voters	SurveyUSA (for KGTV and The San Diego Union-Tribune)	May 29–31, 2018	45%	51%	3%	612	telephone	
Virginia	Registered voters	Roanoke College	May 20–30, 2018	36%	49%	2%	555	telephone	
United States	All adults	YouGov (for The Economist)	May 27–29, 2018	39%	49%	11%	1,500	online	
United States	All adults	Ipsos (for Reuters)	May 25–29, 2018	42%	53%	5%	2,352	online	
Texas	Registered voters	Quinnipiac University	May 23–29, 2018	47%	47%	5%	961	telephone	
United States	All adults	Gallup	May 21–27, 2018	40%	55%	---	1,500	telephone	
United States	Registered voters	Harvard University/The Harris Poll	May 21–22, 2018	45%	55%	---	1,347	online	
United States	All adults	Ipsos (for Reuters)	May 18–22, 2018	45%	52%	2%	1,294	online	
United States	All adults	American Research Group	May 17–20, 2018	37%	58%	5%	1,100	telephone	
United States	All adults	Gallup	May 14–20, 2018	42%	54%	---	1,500	telephone	
California	All adults	Public Policy Institute of California	May 11–20, 2018	30%	63%	7%	1,682	telephone	
California	Registered voters	Los Angeles Times/University of Southern California	April 18 – May 18, 2018	28%	69%	3%	691	online	
United States	All adults	YouGov (for The Economist)	May 13–15, 2018	39%	50%	12%	1,500	online	
United States	All adults	Ipsos (for Reuters)	May 11–15, 2018	45%	54%	1%	1,491	online	
Indiana	Likely voters	Gravis Marketing	May 10–15, 2018	47%	47%	7%	400	telephone and online	
United States	All adults	Gallup	May 7–13, 2018	43%	52%	---	1,500	telephone	
United States	All adults	YouGov (for The Economist)	May 6–8, 2018	42%	45%	12%	1,500	online	
United States	All adults	Ipsos (for Reuters)	May 4–8, 2018	44%	54%	2%	1,365	online	
Tennessee	Registered voters	Vanderbilt University	April 26 – May 8, 2018	53%	44%	2%	1,400	telephone	
United States	All adults	CBS News	May 3–6, 2018	40%	55%	6%	1,101	telephone	
United States	All adults	Gallup	April 30 – May 6, 2018	42%	52%	---	1,500	telephone	
United States	All adults	CNN	May 2–5, 2018	41%	53%	6%	1,015	telephone	
United States	All adults	Investor's Business Daily	April 26 – May 4, 2018	38%	56%	1%	900	telephone	
United States	All adults	YouGov (for The Economist)	April 29 – May 1, 2018	40%	50%	10%	1,500	online	
(New York (state)) New York	Registered voters	Quinnipiac University	April 26 – May 1, 2018	31%	66%	4%	1,076	telephone	
United States	All adults	Pew Research Center	April 25 – May 1, 2018	39%	54%	6%	1,503	telephone	

majority approve plurality approve majority disapprove plurality disapprove

== April ==
Area polled	Segment polled	Polling group	Date	Approve	Disapprove	Unsure	Sample size	Polling method	Source(s)
North Carolina	Registered voters	SurveyUSA (for Spectrum News North Carolina)	April 27–30, 2018	43%	50%	7%	526	online	
New Hampshire	Likely voters	Suffolk University	April 26–30, 2018	39%	51%	10%	800	telephone	
United States	All adults	Monmouth University	April 26–30, 2018	41%	50%	9%	803	telephone	
United States	All adults	Kaiser Family Foundation	April 20–30, 2018	40%	55%	5%	2,000	telephone	
United States	All adults	Gallup	April 23–29, 2018	42%	53%	---	1,500	telephone	
New Hampshire	Registered voters	Saint Anselm College	April 21–25, 2018	41%	58%	2%	630	telephone	
United States	Registered voters	Fox News	April 22–24, 2018	44%	53%	3%	1,014	telephone	
United States	All adults	YouGov (for The Economist)	April 22–24, 2018	38%	49%	13%	1,500	online	
United States	Registered voters	Harvard University/The Harris Poll	April 22–24, 2018	44%	56%	---	1,549	online	
United States	Registered voters	Quinnipiac University	April 20–24, 2018	39%	54%	7%	1,193	telephone	
Tennessee	Registered voters	SurveyMonkey (for Axios)	April 2–23, 2018	54%	45%	1%	1,639	online	
Nevada	Registered voters	SurveyMonkey (for Axios)	April 2–23, 2018	46%	53%	1%	1,332	online	
Arizona	Registered voters	SurveyMonkey (for Axios)	April 2–23, 2018	44%	55%	1%	1,667	online	
California	Registered voters	University of California, Berkeley	April 16–22, 2018	31%	67%	2%	4,038	online	
United States	All adults	Gallup	April 16–22, 2018	38%	57%	---	1,500	telephone	
New Hampshire	All adults	University of New Hampshire	April 13–22, 2018	41%	52%	7%	548	telephone	
United States	All adults	American Research Group	April 17–20, 2018	38%	56%	6%	1,100	telephone	
Maryland	All adults	Goucher College	April 14–19, 2018	25%	70%	3%	617	telephone	
United States	All adults	YouGov (for The Economist)	April 15–17, 2018	38%	53%	9%	1,500	online	
United States	All adults	Ipsos (for Reuters)	April 13–17, 2018	39%	57%	4%	1,509	online	
Texas	Registered voters	Quinnipiac University	April 12–17, 2018	43%	52%	5%	1,029	telephone	
United States	All adults	Associated Press/NORC at the University of Chicago	April 11–16, 2018	40%	59%	1%	1,140	telephone and online	
South Carolina	All adults	Winthrop University	April 7–16, 2018	46%	47%	5%	789	telephone	
United States	All adults	Gallup	April 9–15, 2018	39%	55%	---	1,500	telephone	
United States	All adults	NPR/PBS NewsHour/Marist	April 10–13, 2018	38%	54%	8%	1,011	telephone	
Pennsylvania	Likely voters	The Morning Call/Muhlenberg College	April 4–12, 2018	39%	55%	5%	414	telephone	
United States	All adults	ABC News/The Washington Post	April 8–11, 2018	40%	56%	4%	1,002	telephone	
United States	All adults	NBC News/The Wall Street Journal	April 8–11, 2018	39%	57%	4%	900	telephone	
Indiana	Likely voters	Gravis Marketing	April 6–11, 2018	47%	48%	5%	411	telephone and online	
United States	All adults	YouGov (for The Economist)	April 8–10, 2018	40%	49%	11%	1,500	online	
New Jersey	All adults	Monmouth University	April 6–10, 2018	34%	61%	4%	703	telephone	
United States	All adults	Ipsos (for Reuters)	April 6–10, 2018	38%	57%	5%	1,465	online	
United States	Registered voters	Quinnipiac University	April 6–9, 2018	41%	52%	7%	1,181	telephone	
United States	All adults	Gallup	April 2–8, 2018	41%	54%	---	1,500	telephone	
Missouri	Registered voters	Mason-Dixon Polling & Research Inc.	April 4–6, 2018	47%	45%	8%	625	telephone	
United States	All adults	YouGov (for The Economist)	April 1–3, 2018	38%	52%	10%	1,500	online	
United States	All adults	Ipsos (for Reuters)	March 30 – April 3, 2018	39%	55%	6%	1,837	online	
United States	Registered voters	Greenberg Quinlan Rosner (Democracy Corps)	March 25 – April 2, 2018	43%	53%	4%	1,000	telephone	

majority approve plurality approve majority disapprove plurality disapprove

== March ==
Area polled	Segment polled	Polling group	Date	Approve	Disapprove	Unsure	Sample size	Polling method	Source(s)
United States	All adults	Gallup	March 25–31, 2018	39%	55%	---	1,500	telephone	
United States	All adults	Investor's Business Daily	March 22–29, 2018	38%	56%	1%	902	telephone	
Tennessee	Registered voters	Middle Tennessee State University	March 22–29, 2018	50%	41%	8%	600	telephone	
United States	All adults	YouGov (for The Economist)	March 25–27, 2018	39%	49%	12%	1,500	online	
United States	All adults	Ipsos (for Reuters)	March 23–27, 2018	40%	55%	5%	1,670	online	
New York City	Registered voters	Quinnipiac University	March 22–27, 2018	19%	76%	4%	955	telephone	
New Hampshire	All adults	American Research Group	March 21–27, 2018	39%	58%	3%	1,500	telephone	
North Carolina	All adults	High Point University#HPU Poll/High Point University	March 19–26, 2018	40%	50%	11%	402	telephone	
United States	Registered voters	Public Policy Polling	March 23–25, 2018	39%	54%	6%	848	telephone and online	
United States	All adults	CNN	March 22–25, 2018	42%	54%	5%	1,014	telephone	
United States	All adults	Gallup	March 19–25, 2018	39%	55%	---	1,500	telephone	
United States	All adults	Marist	March 19–21, 2018	40%	51%	9%	1,271	telephone	
Ohio	Registered voters	SurveyUSA (for WOIO-TV)	March 17–21, 2018	41%	51%	8%	1,408	telephone	
United States	Registered voters	Fox News	March 18–21, 2018	45%	52%	2%	1,014	telephone	
United States	All adults	YouGov (for The Economist)	March 18–20, 2018	37%	52%	10%	1,500	online	
United States	All adults	CNBC	March 17–20, 2018	39%	50%	11%	801	telephone	
United States	All adults	American Research Group	March 17–20, 2018	39%	56%	5%	1,100	telephone	
United States	Registered voters	Quinnipiac University	March 16–20, 2018	40%	53%	7%	1,291	telephone	
United States	All adults	Associated Press/NORC at the University of Chicago	March 14–19, 2018	42%	58%	---	1,122	telephone and online	
Hawaii	Registered voters	Honolulu Star-Advertiser	March 13–18, 2018	31%	56%	13%	800	telephone	
United States	All adults	Gallup	March 12–18, 2018	40%	56%	---	1,500	telephone	
United States	All adults	NBC News/The Wall Street Journal	March 10–14, 2018	43%	53%	4%	1,100	telephone	
United States	All adults	Pew Research Center	March 7–14, 2018	39%	54%	7%	1,466	telephone	
United States	All adults	YouGov (for The Economist)	March 10–13, 2018	39%	52%	9%	1,500	online	
United States	All adults	Ipsos (for Reuters)	March 9–13, 2018	39%	56%	5%	1,411	online	
United States	All adults	Kaiser Family Foundation	March 8–13, 2018	41%	56%	3%	1,212	telephone	
California	All adults	Public Policy Institute of California	March 4–13, 2018	30%	65%	5%	1,688	telephone	
New Jersey	Registered voters	Quinnipiac University	March 8–12, 2018	32%	63%	5%	1,052	telephone	
United States	All adults	CBS News	March 8–11, 2018	38%	57%	5%	1,227	telephone	
United States	All adults	Gallup	March 5–11, 2018	39%	56%	---	1,500	telephone	
United States	Likely voters	George Washington University	March 4–8, 2018	42%	55%	4%	1,000	telephone	
Missouri	Registered voters	Gravis Marketing	March 5–7, 2018	46%	50%	4%	931	telephone and online	
United States	All adults	Marist	March 5–6, 2018	42%	50%	8%	1,050	telephone	
United States	All adults	YouGov (for The Economist)	March 4–6, 2018	40%	50%	10%	1,500	online	
United States	All adults	Ipsos (for Reuters)	March 2–6, 2018	40%	54%	6%	2,927	online	
United States	Registered voters	Quinnipiac University	March 3–5, 2018	38%	56%	6%	1,122	telephone	
United States	All adults	Monmouth University	March 2–5, 2018	39%	54%	8%	803	telephone	
United States	All adults	Gallup	February 26 – March 4, 2018	39%	55%	---	1,500	telephone	
Wisconsin	Registered voters	Marquette University Law School	February 25 – March 1, 2018	43%	50%	6%	800	telephone	
United States	All adults	Investor's Business Daily	February 22 – March 1, 2018	37%	58%	1%	901	telephone	

majority approve plurality approve majority disapprove plurality disapprove

== February ==
Area polled	Segment polled	Polling group	Date	Approve	Disapprove	Unsure	Sample size	Polling method	Source(s)
Virginia	Registered voters	Wason Center for Public Policy	February 5–28, 2018	37%	60%	3%	1,562	telephone	
United States	All adults	YouGov (for The Economist)	February 25–27, 2018	40%	51%	9%	1,500	online	
United States	All adults	Ipsos (for Reuters)	February 23–27, 2018	40%	56%	4%	1,651	online	
Florida	Registered voters	Quinnipiac University	February 23–26, 2018	42%	54%	4%	1,156	telephone	
Illinois	Registered voters	Paul Simon Public Policy Institute	February 19–25, 2018	36%	62%	1%	1,001	telephone	
North Carolina	All adults	High Point University#HPU Poll/High Point University	February 19–25, 2018	38%	51%	11%	513	telephone	
United States	Registered voters	Suffolk University/USA Today	February 20–24, 2018	38%	60%	3%	1,000	telephone	
United States	All adults	CNN	February 20–23, 2018	35%	58%	7%	1,016	telephone	
United States	All adults	Marist	February 20–21, 2018	38%	54%	9%	1,026	telephone	
United States	All adults	YouGov (for The Economist)	February 18–20, 2018	41%	48%	11%	1,500	online	
United States	All adults	American Research Group	February 17–20, 2018	36%	60%	4%	1,100	telephone	
United States	All adults	Ipsos (for Reuters)	February 16–20, 2018	40%	55%	6%	1,104	online	
United States	All adults	Kaiser Family Foundation	February 15–20, 2018	39%	56%	5%	1,193	telephone	
United States	Registered voters	Quinnipiac University	February 16–19, 2018	37%	58%	5%	1,249	telephone	
United States	All adults	Associated Press/NORC at the University of Chicago	February 15–19, 2018	35%	64%	---	1,337	telephone and online	
United States	All adults	Gallup	February 12–18, 2018	37%	59%	---	1,500	telephone	
Florida	Registered voters	Gravis Marketing	February 1–18, 2018	41%	49%	10%	1,978	telephone and online	
Maryland	All adults	Goucher College	February 12–17, 2018	27%	68%	4%	800	telephone	
United States	All adults	SurveyMonkey	February 8–14, 2018	43%	55%	2%	13,293	online	
United States	All adults	YouGov (for The Economist)	February 11–13, 2018	41%	51%	8%	1,500	online	
United States	Registered voters	Fox News	February 10–13, 2018	43%	53%	3%	1,005	telephone	
United States	All adults	Ipsos (for Reuters)	February 9–13, 2018	39%	54%	6%	1,515	online	
United States	All adults	Pew Research Center	January 29 – February 13, 2018	38%	60%	2%	4,656	telephone and online	
(New York (state)) New York	Registered voters	Quinnipiac University	February 9–12, 2018	30%	65%	4%	1,038	telephone	
Texas	Registered voters	YouGov (for the University of Texas and The Texas Tribune)	February 1–12, 2018	46%	46%	8%	1,200	online	
United States	Registered voters	Public Policy Polling	February 9–11, 2018	44%	50%	6%	687	telephone and online	
North Carolina	All adults	High Point University#HPU Poll/High Point University	February 5–11, 2018	38%	50%	12%	439	telephone	
United States	All adults	Gallup	February 5–11, 2018	40%	57%	---	1,500	telephone	
New Hampshire	All adults	University of New Hampshire	January 28 – February 10, 2018	35%	59%	7%	523	telephone	
United States	Likely voters	McLaughlin & Associates	February 5–9, 2018	46%	52%	2%	1,000	online	
United States	All adults	Marist	February 5–7, 2018	38%	54%	7%	1,012	telephone	
United States	All adults	YouGov (for The Economist)	February 4–6, 2018	40%	52%	9%	1,500	online	
United States	Registered voters	Quinnipiac University	February 2–5, 2018	40%	55%	5%	1,333	telephone	
Florida	Registered voters	Florida Atlantic University	February 1–4, 2018	41%	44%	15%	750	telephone and online	
Florida	Registered voters	University of North Florida	January 29 – February 4, 2018	43%	53%	2%	619	telephone	
United States	All adults	Gallup	January 29 – February 4, 2018	40%	57%	---	1,500	telephone	
United States	All adults	Investor's Business Daily	January 25 – February 2, 2018	35%	58%	1%	900	telephone	
United States	All adults	SurveyMonkey (for NBC News)	January 30 – February 1, 2018	45%	53%	2%	4,425	online	

majority approve plurality approve majority disapprove plurality disapprove

== January ==
Area polled	Segment polled	Polling group	Date	Approve	Disapprove	Unsure	Sample size	Polling method	Source(s)
Iowa	All adults	The Des Moines Register/Mediacom	January 28–31, 2018	44%	51%	5%	801	telephone	
United States	All adults	SurveyMonkey	January 25–31, 2018	44%	55%	1%	16,564	online	
United States	All adults	Monmouth University	January 28–30, 2018	42%	50%	8%	806	telephone	
United States	All adults	YouGov (for The Economist)	January 28–30, 2018	39%	51%	10%	1,500	online	
United States	All adults	Ipsos (for Reuters)	January 26–30, 2018	41%	53%	6%	1,856	online	
California	Likely voters	Public Policy Institute of California	January 21–30, 2018	32%	67%	1%	1,038	telephone	
New Jersey	All adults	Fairleigh Dickinson University	January 24–28, 2018	31%	60%	8%	810	telephone	
North Carolina	Registered voters	Meredith College	January 21–25, 2018	49%	48%	2%	621	telephone and online	
United States	Registered voters	Fox News	January 21–23, 2018	45%	53%	2%	1,002	telephone	
United States	All adults	YouGov (for The Economist)	January 21–23, 2018	39%	52%	9%	1,500	online	
United States	Registered voters	Quinnipiac University	January 19–23, 2018	36%	58%	6%	1,245	telephone	
United States	All adults	SurveyMonkey (for NBC News)	January 20–22, 2018	41%	58%	1%	3,450	online	
United States	Registered voters	Public Policy Polling (for the Center for American Progress)	January 20–21, 2018	40%	56%	4%	996	telephone	
North Carolina	Registered voters	Public Policy Polling	January 19–21, 2018	42%	50%	8%	839	telephone and online	
United States	All adults	Kaiser Family Foundation	January 16–21, 2018	38%	58%	3%	1,215	telephone	
United States	All adults	American Research Group	January 17–20, 2018	35%	60%	5%	1,100	telephone	
United States	Registered voters	Harvard University/The Harris Poll	January 17–19, 2018	44%	56%	---	980	online	
Michigan	Likely voters	The Detroit News/WDIV Local 4	January 16–19, 2018	40%	54%	6%	600	telephone	
United States	All adults	ABC News/The Washington Post	January 15–18, 2018	36%	58%	5%	1,005	telephone	
Utah	Registered voters	The Salt Lake Tribune/Hinckley Institute of Politics	January 15–18, 2018	48%	49%	---	803	telephone	
United States	All adults	CNN	January 14–18, 2018	40%	55%	5%	1,005	telephone	
United States	All adults	NBC News/The Wall Street Journal	January 13–17, 2018	39%	57%	4%	900	telephone	
United States	All adults	SurveyMonkey	January 4–17, 2018	42%	56%	2%	13,363	online	
United States	All adults	YouGov (for The Economist)	January 14–16, 2018	42%	52%	6%	1,500	online	
United States	All adults	CBS News	January 13–16, 2018	37%	58%	5%	1,225	telephone	
United States	Registered voters	Harvard University/The Harris Poll	January 13–16, 2018	42%	58%	---	1,962	online	
United States	Registered voters	Quinnipiac University	January 12–16, 2018	38%	57%	5%	1,212	telephone	
United States	All adults	Ipsos (for Reuters)	January 12–16, 2018	39%	56%	5%	1,638	online	
United States	Registered voters	Morning Consult (for Politico)	January 11–16, 2018	45%	50%	5%	1,993	online	
United States	Likely voters	Zogby Analytics	January 12–15, 2018	46%	51%	4%	847	online	
United States	All adults	Pew Research Center	January 10–15, 2018	37%	56%	5%	1,503	telephone	
United States	All adults	Los Angeles Times/USC Dornsife	December 15, 2017 – January 15, 2018	32%	55%	---	3,862	online	
United States	All adults	Gallup	January 8–14, 2018	38%	57%	---	1,500	telephone	
United States	Registered voters	Emerson College	January 8–11, 2018	39%	52%	10%	600	telephone and online	
United States	Likely voters	McLaughlin & Associates	January 5–11, 2018	46%	53%	1%	1,000	online	
United States	All adults	NPR/PBS NewsHour/Marist	January 8–10, 2018	37%	53%	10%	1,350	telephone	
Minnesota	Registered voters	Star Tribune	January 8–10, 2018	45%	47%	8%	800	telephone	
(Georgia (U.S. state)) Georgia	Registered voters	The Atlanta Journal-Constitution	January 3–5 and 7–10, 2018	37%	59%	5%	940	telephone	
United States	All adults	Investor's Business Daily	January 2–10, 2018	35%	58%	1%	901	telephone	
United States	All adults	YouGov (for The Economist)	January 8–9, 2018	38%	51%	10%	1,500	online	
Missouri	Registered voters	Public Policy Polling	January 8–9, 2018	48%	47%	5%	965	telephone and online	
United States	All adults	Ipsos (for Reuters)	January 5–9, 2018	41%	55%	4%	1,616	online	
United States	Registered voters	Quinnipiac University	January 5–9, 2018	36%	59%	5%	1,106	telephone	
Massachusetts	Registered voters	WBUR	January 5–7, 2018	29%	65%	5%	504	telephone	
United States	All adults	Gallup	January 2–7, 2018	37%	58%	---	1,500	telephone	
United States	Registered voters	Morning Consult (for Politico)	January 4–5, 2018	44%	51%	5%	1,988	online	
Maryland	Registered voters	Gonzales Research	December 27, 2017 – January 5, 2018	36%	60%	4%	823	telephone	
Iowa	Registered voters	Public Policy Polling	January 3–4, 2018	44%	51%	5%	664	telephone	
Missouri	Likely voters	Remington Research Group	January 3–4, 2018	50%	44%	6%	1,122	telephone	
United States	All adults	SurveyMonkey	December 28, 2017 – January 3, 2018	44%	54%	2%	12,238	online	
United States	All adults	YouGov (for The Economist)	December 31, 2017 – January 2, 2018	38%	52%	9%	1,500	online	
United States	All adults	Ipsos (for Reuters)	December 29, 2017 – January 2, 2018	41%	54%	5%	1,770	online	

majority approve plurality approve majority disapprove plurality disapprove
