= Timeline of the first Trump presidency (2019 Q3) =

The following is a timeline of the presidency of Donald Trump during the third quarter of 2019, from July 1 to September 30, 2019. For a complete itinerary of his travels, see List of presidential trips made by Donald Trump (2019). To between navigate quarters, see timeline of the Donald Trump presidencies. For the Q4 timeline see timeline of the first Trump presidency (2019 Q4).

== Timeline ==
=== July 2019 ===
Date	Events	Photos/videos
Monday, July 1	White House communications adviser Mercedes Schlapp announces leaving the Trump administration and joining the Trump 2020 Campaign.	
Tuesday, July 2	President Trump nominates Judy Shelton and Christopher Waller to fill the last two vacant seats on the Federal Reserve's Board of the Governors.	Federal Reserve governors meeting, April 2019
Wednesday, July 3		
Thursday, July 4	President Trump hosts military personnel and their families for a picnic and fireworks show at the Lincoln Memorial as part of Independence Day celebrations.; President Trump's 2019 Salute to America occurs on Independence Day in Washington, D.C., in addition to other events.	President Trump speaks at the Salute to America event
Friday, July 5		
Saturday, July 6		
Sunday, July 7		
Monday, July 8		
Tuesday, July 9	President Trump holds a bilateral meeting with Emir Tamim bin Hamad Al Thani of Qatar at the White House.	President Trump and Emir Tamim bin Hamad Al Thani of Qatar
Wednesday, July 10		
Thursday, July 11	President Trump speaks to attendees at the President's Social Media Summit.	
Friday, July 12	Secretary of Labor Alex Acosta resigns amid controversy surrounding the non-prosecution agreement he made with Jeffrey Epstein as the United States attorney for the Southern District of Florida.; President Trump names Patrick Pizzella as acting secretary of labor to replace Alex Acosta, following the latter's resignation.	President Trump delivers a statement upon the departure of Alexander Acosta on July 12
Saturday, July 13		
Sunday, July 14	President Trump tweets that progressive Democratic congresswomen should "go back and help fix the totally broken and crime infested places from which they came", drawing widespread criticism, even from some Republicans.	
Monday, July 15	President Trump launches "Made in America Week" at the White House by showcasing products made in all fifty states.	President Trump delivers remarks at the Made in America Product Showcase
Tuesday, July 16	President Trump denies that his previous tweets made towards several Democratic congresswomen were in any way racist.	
Wednesday, July 17	President Trump holds a meeting with survivors of religious persecution with the United States ambassador-at-large for international religious freedom, Sam Brownback. Notable participants include Pastor Andrew Brunson and Nobel Peace Prize winner Nadia Murad.; President Trump holds a rally in Greenville, North Carolina.; The House of Representatives votes to hold Attorney General William Barr and Commerce Secretary Wilbur Ross in contempt over an administration decision to add a citizenship question to the 2020 census.	President Trump speaks to supporters at a rally in Greenville, North Carolina
Thursday, July 18	President Trump holds a bilateral meeting with Dutch prime minister Mark Rutte at the White House.; President Trump claims he did in fact try to stop the crowds chants and "was unhappy" with the chants of "send her back" from his supporters during the Greensville rally on July 17.	President Trump and Dutch prime minister Mark Rutte
Friday, July 19	President Trump meets with Apollo 11 astronauts Buzz Aldrin and Michael Collins.	President Trump with Mike Pence, Jim Bridenstine, Buzz Aldrin, and Michael Collins
Saturday, July 20		
Sunday, July 21		
Monday, July 22	President Trump holds a bilateral meeting with Pakistani prime minister Imran Khan at the White House.	President Trump and Pakistani prime minister Imran Khan
Tuesday, July 23	The Senate confirms Mark Esper as the 27th U.S. secretary of defense in a vote of 90–8.	President Trump participates in the swearing-in of Secretary of Defense Mark Esper
Wednesday, July 24	Former special counsel Robert Mueller testifies before the House Judiciary Committee and the House Intelligence Committee on the Mueller Report.	
Thursday, July 25	During a phone conversation with the newly elected Ukrainian president Volodymyr Zelenskyy, President Trump repeatedly presses him to open an investigation into Hunter Biden, the son of potential 2020 presidential candidate and former vice president Joe Biden.; The Senate confirms Mark A. Milley as the 20th chairman of the Joint Chiefs of Staff in a vote of 89–1.	A memorandum with a non-verbatim record of the call between Trump and Zelenskyy released by the White House
Friday, July 26	The Supreme Court rules in a 5–4 decision that President Trump may use military funding for construction of the Mexico–United States border wall.	
Saturday, July 27	President Trump draws criticism for his tweet describing Congressman Elijah Cummings' Baltimore, Maryland, district as a "disgusting, rat and rodent infested mess".	
Sunday, July 28	President Trump names Congressman John Ratcliffe as Director of National Intelligence.; Three people are killed and 15 injured at the Gilroy, California, Garlic Festival. The suspect, Santino William Legan, is shot dead by police.	
Monday, July 29	President Trump signs H.R. 1327, the September 11th Victim Compensation Fund.	President Trump signs H.R. 1327, the September 11th Victim Compensation Fund
Tuesday, July 30		President Trump delivers remarks upon departure on July 30, 2019
Wednesday, July 31	President Trump holds a bilateral meeting with Mongolian president Khaltmaagiin Battulga at the White House.	President Trump and Mongolian president Khaltmaagiin Battulga

=== August 2019 ===
Date	Events	Photos/videos
Thursday, August 1	President Trump holds a rally in Cincinnati, Ohio.	
Friday, August 2	President Trump withdraws Congressman John Ratcliffe from consideration as Director of National Intelligence.; President Trump announces that he has reached a deal with the European Union that will allow the United States to sell more beef to Europe.	President Trump makes an announcement on European Union trade
Saturday, August 3	Twenty-three people are killed and 24 injured at a Walmart Supercenter in El Paso, Texas. The suspect, Patrick Crusius, is captured by police.; Speaking from his golf resort in Bedminster, N.J., President Trump condemns the shooting, calling it an "act of cowardice".	
Sunday, August 4	A mass shooting occurs in the Oregon District of Dayton, Ohio, at 1:00 a.m.—less than 24 hours after the El Paso shootings—leaving nine dead and at least 27 injured. The gunman, Connor Stephen Betts, is killed at the scene attempting to enter the Ned Peppers Bar.; In New Jersey, President Trump declares "hate has no place in our country" and suggests that mental illness played a role in both shootings.	
Monday, August 5	President Trump addresses the nation in regards to the mass shootings in El Paso, Texas, and Dayton, Ohio, offering his condolences to the victims and their families.	President Trump addresses the nation following the El Paso, Texas, and Dayton, Ohio, mass shootings
Tuesday, August 6		
Wednesday, August 7	President Trump and First Lady Melania Trump visit victims of Dayton and El Paso mass shootings.; The Senate confirms Kelly Craft as the next United States ambassador to the United Nations in a 56–34 vote.	President Trump and First Lady Melania Trump meet a Dayton mass shooting victim President Trump and First Lady Melania Trump meet a El Paso mass shooting victim President Trump and the First Lady with the family and baby son of El Paso shooting victims Jordan and Andre Anchondo
Thursday, August 8		
Friday, August 9		
Saturday, August 10		
Sunday, August 11		
Monday, August 12	The Trump administration announces a new immigration policy designed to limit the number of green card applicants from legal migrants.	
Tuesday, August 13	President Trump visits the Shell Pennsylvania Petrochemicals Complex.	President Trump speaks to workers at the Shell Pennsylvania Petrochemicals Complex in Monaca, Pennsylvania
Wednesday, August 14		
Thursday, August 15	President Trump holds a rally in Manchester, New Hampshire.; Dan Coats steps down as Director of National Intelligence. With the resignation of acting director Sue Gordon, Joseph Maguire, the leader of the National Counterterrorism Center, will become the acting director of national intelligence.	
Friday, August 16	President Trump expresses interest in purchasing Greenland from Denmark. Both Danish and Greenlandic officials reject the proposal.	
Saturday, August 17		
Sunday, August 18		
Monday, August 19		
Tuesday, August 20	President Trump holds a bilateral meeting with Romanian president Klaus Iohannis at the White House.; President Trump asserts that any Jew who votes for a Democrat is either, "disloyal or unintelligent".	President Trump and Romanian president Klaus Iohannis
Wednesday, August 21	President Trump proclaims "I am the chosen one" to reporters at the White House.	While gaggling with reporters at the White House, President Trump proclaims "I am the chosen one" and looks up at the sky.
Thursday, August 22	President Trump presents the Presidential Medal of Freedom to NBA legend Bob Cousy. He also jokingly adds he would like to "give myself a Medal of Honor".	President Trump awards the Presidential Medal of Freedom to Bob Cousy
Friday, August 23	President Trump asserts that he reserves the right to order U.S. companies to stop doing business with China.	
Saturday, August 24	President Trump attends the 45th G7 summit in Biarritz and holds a bilateral meeting with French president Emmanuel Macron.	President Trump and French president Emmanuel Macron during the G7 summit
Sunday, August 25	President Trump holds bilateral meetings with Australian prime minister Scott Morrison, British prime minister Boris Johnson, Canadian prime minister Justin Trudeau and Japanese prime minister Shinzō Abe.	President Trump and other world leaders at the 45th G7 summit
Monday, August 26	President Trump holds bilateral meetings with Egyptian president Abdel Fattah el-Sisi, German chancellor Angela Merkel and Indian prime minister Narendra Modi.; President Trump fails to attend the G7 discussion on climate, biodiversity, and the Amazon forest fires. The White House makes false claims stating Trump was attending other engagements with German chancellor Angela Merkel and Indian prime minister Narendra Modi. Both leaders attend the climate session.; President Trump holds a joint press conference with French president Emmanuel Macron.	President Trump and French president Emmanuel Macron during the press conference after the G7 summit
Tuesday, August 27		
Wednesday, August 28	President Trump announces a new administration rule that citizenship will no longer be automatic for children of some U.S. military members living overseas.	
Thursday, August 29	President Trump establishes the U.S. Space Command.; Department of Justice (DOJ) inspector general Michael E. Horowitz releases a report stating that James Comey violated FBI rules.; The Trump administration and the Environmental Protection Agency (EPA) announce a reduction of restrictions on the production of Methane, a powerful greenhouse gas.; Madeleine Westerhout, President Trump's personal assistant, resigns after sharing private details about the president's family with journalists.	President Trump during establishment of the U.S. Space Command
Friday, August 30	President Trump tweets a high-resolution aerial image of a failed Iranian missile launch. Ankit Panda, who specializes in analyzing satellite imagery at the Federation of American Scientists, remarked "The resolution is amazingly high. I would think it's probably below well below 20 centimeters, which is much higher than anything I've ever seen," adding the image disclosed "some pretty amazing capabilities that the public simply wasn't privy to before this." The image appeared to be a snapshot of a physical photograph, which a defense official said had been included in Trump's intelligence briefing that morning. Satellite tracking analysts concluded the image was likely taken by the USA-224 reconnaissance satellite. Some intelligence veterans expressed dismay that Trump tweeted the image, which he asserted he had the "absolute right to do".	Site of a satellite launch vehicle failure in Iran
Saturday, August 31	A spree shooting occurs in the cities of Midland and Odessa, Texas, leaving seven dead and 22 injured. The perpetrator, Seth Ator, is shot by police and dies at the scene.	

=== September 2019 ===
Date	Events	Photos/videos
Sunday, September 1		
Monday, September 2		
Tuesday, September 3	Secretary of Defense Mark Esper authorizes the transfer of 3.6 billion dollars of military funds to the construction Mexico–United States border wall.	
Wednesday, September 4		
Thursday, September 5	President Trump presents the Presidential Medal of Freedom to Jerry West.	President Trump awards the Presidential Medal of Freedom to Jerry West
Friday, September 6	A report shows that the United States added 130,000 jobs in August, missing economists' expectations; the national unemployment rate remains unchanged at 3.7%.	
Saturday, September 7		
Sunday, September 8		
Monday, September 9	President Trump awards the Medal of Valor to the first responders in the mass shootings in Dayton, Ohio, and El Paso, Texas.; President Trump holds a rally in Fayetteville, North Carolina.	President Trump with Congressman Dan Bishop at a rally in Fayetteville, North Carolina
Tuesday, September 10	National Security Advisor John Bolton resigns following President Trump's request the day before.; Charles Kupperman is named acting national security advisor after John Bolton was asked to resign.	
Wednesday, September 11	President Trump and First Lady Melania Trump lay a wreath at the September 11 memorial at the Pentagon and later pay tribute to all the nearly three thousand Americans killed that day, pledging to continue to confront radical Islamic terrorism.; The Trump administration announces that it will ban the sale of flavored e-cigarettes, in response to numerous mysterious respiratory diseases that appear to have been caused by vaping.	President Trump speaks at the Pentagon on the 18th anniversary of 9/11
Thursday, September 12		
Friday, September 13	Trump administration opens huge reserve in Alaska to drilling.	
Saturday, September 14		
Sunday, September 15		
Monday, September 16	President Trump presents the Presidential Medal of Freedom to Mariano Rivera.; President Trump meets with Crown Prince Salman bin Hamad of Bahrain at the White House.; President Trump holds a rally in Rio Rancho, New Mexico.	President Trump awards the Presidential Medal of Freedom to Mariano Rivera President Trump and Crown Prince Salman bin Hamad of Bahrain
Tuesday, September 17	President Trump arrives in California for a two-day fundraising visit to benefit the Trump Victory Committee.	
Wednesday, September 18	President Trump visits San Diego, California, and meets with Border Patrol personnel.; President Trump names Robert O'Brien as the next national security advisor.; President Trump announces on Twitter that he is revoking California's ability to set its own auto emissions standards.	President Trump at the Mexican border
Thursday, September 19	President Trump meets with Facebook CEO Mark Zuckerberg, in an unannounced meeting. This was the first face-to-face meeting between the two men.	President Trump and Mark Zuckerberg
Friday, September 20	Australian prime minister Scott Morrison, accompanied by his wife, begins a state visit, his second during the Trump presidency.; President Trump holds a bilateral meeting and joint press conference with Australian prime minister Scott Morrison at the White House.; President Trump and First Lady Melania Trump host their second and final state dinner of this term in honor of Australian prime minister Scott Morrison and his wife, Jenny.	President Trump and First Lady Melania Trump with Australian prime minister Scott Morrison and Jenny Morrison
Saturday, September 21		
Sunday, September 22	President Trump attends a "Howdy, Modi" rally with Indian prime minister Narendra Modi in Houston, Texas.; President Trump visits Pratt Industries plant with Australian prime minister Scott Morrison in Wapakoneta, Ohio.	President Trump and Indian prime minister Narendra Modi during the Howdy, Modi event
Monday, September 23	President Trump attends the United Nations event on "Religious Freedom" at the Headquarters of the United Nations.; President Trump holds bilateral meetings with Pakistani prime minister Imran Khan, Polish president Andrzej Duda, New Zealand prime minister Jacinda Ardern, Singaporean prime minister Lee Hsien Loong, Egyptian president Abdel Fattah el-Sisi, and South Korean president Moon Jae-in at the UN General Assembly in New York City.; President Trump admits to pressuring the Ukrainian president Volodymyr Zelenskyy, during a phone call on July 25, to investigate potentially damaging information against Democratic candidate Joe Biden's son, Hunter.	President Trump at the United Nations "Religious Freedom" event
Tuesday, September 24	President Trump addresses the United Nations General Assembly at the Headquarters of the United Nations.; President Trump holds bilateral meetings with British prime minister Boris Johnson and Indian prime minister Narendra Modi at the UN General Assembly in New York City.; While at the United Nations, President Trump tweets that he will release a memorandum of his July phone call to Ukrainian President Volodymyr Zelenskyy, in which they reportedly discussed Joe Biden, Hunter Biden, and the 2020 American election.; Speaker of the House Nancy Pelosi announces that the House of Representatives will launch a formal impeachment inquiry against President Trump.	President Trump addresses the 74th session of the United Nations General Assembly Speaker Pelosi announces a formal impeachment inquiry against President Trump
Wednesday, September 25	President Trump holds bilateral meetings with Japanese prime minister Shinzō Abe, Ukrainian president Volodymyr Zelenskyy, and Salvadoran president Nayib Bukele at the UN General Assembly in New York City.; A whistleblower complaint that was filed on August 12 is declassified and released to the public by a 421–0 vote in the House of Representatives. It accuses President Trump of "abus[ing] his office for personal gain" by "[soliciting] interference" from Ukraine in the 2020 election and that the White House took steps to cover it up". Michael Atkinson, the inspector general for the intelligence community, had deemed the complaint "urgent and credible" and submitted it to the acting director of national intelligence, Joseph Maguire.; A release of President Trump's phone call with Ukrainian president Volodymyr Zelenskyy shows that President Trump repeatedly pressured Zelenskyy to investigate the potential 2020 presidential candidate and former vice president Joe Biden and his son Hunter with Rudy Giuliani and Attorney General William Barr.	President Trump holds a bilateral meeting with Ukrainian president Volodymyr Zelenskyy President Trump's press conference
Thursday, September 26	President Trump visits the United States Mission to the United Nations.; Acting Director of National Intelligence Joseph Maguire meets with the House Intelligence Committee to discuss the whistleblower complaint and the transcript of the phone conversation between the two presidents. Maguire supported his decision to delay informing Congress of the whistleblower document as required but instead having diverted the complaint to the Justice Department and the White House for review.; The Senate confirms Eugene Scalia as the 28th U.S. secretary of labor in a vote of 53–44.; The Senate confirms General John E. Hyten as Vice Chairman of the Joint Chiefs of Staff in a vote of 77–2.; The administration says it plans to allow only 18,000 refugees to resettle in the United States in the 2020 fiscal year, its lowest level since the modern program began in 1980.	
Friday, September 27	President Trump celebrates Hispanic Heritage Month at the White House.; President Trump's special envoy for Ukraine Kurt Volker resigns amid reports that he introduced Trump's personal attorney, Rudy Giuliani, to Ukrainian officials.	President Trump and Vice President Pence commemorate Hispanic Heritage Month
Saturday, September 28		
Sunday, September 29		
Monday, September 30	Eugene Scalia is sworn in as the 28th U.S. secretary of labor.; General Mark A. Milley is sworn in as the 20th chairman of the Joint Chiefs of Staff.; A White House official reports that President Trump pressured Australian prime minister Scott Morrison to find information for a Justice Department inspection of the Mueller investigation in an attempt to destroy said investigation.	President Trump participates in the swearing-in of Secretary of Labor Eugene Scalia

== See also ==
- First 100 days of the first Trump presidency – Period from January to April 2017
- List of executive actions by Donald Trump
- Lists of presidential trips made by Donald Trump (international trips)
- First presidential transition of Donald Trump – Transfer of presidential power from Barack Obama to Donald Trump
- Timeline of the 2016 United States presidential election

U.S. presidential administration timelines
Preceded by First Trump presidency (2019 Q2)	First Trump presidency (2019 Q3)	Succeeded by First Trump presidency (2019 Q4)
