= Madeleine Westerhout =

American public official (born 1990)

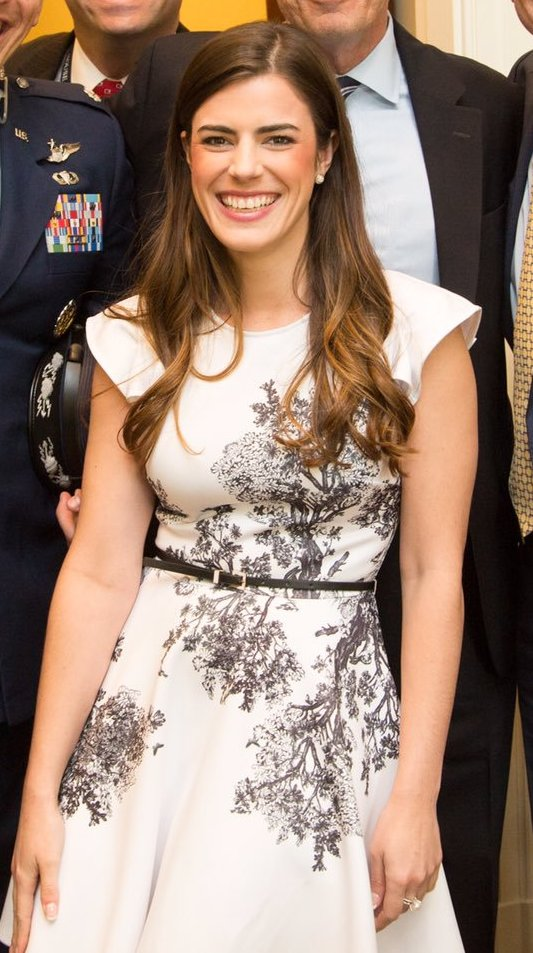

Director of Oval Office Operations
- In office February 2, 2019 – August 29, 2019
- President: Donald Trump
- Preceded by: Jordan Karem
- Succeeded by: Nick Luna

Personal Secretary to the President
- In office January 20, 2017 – February 2, 2019
- President: Donald Trump
- Preceded by: Ferial Govashiri
- Succeeded by: Molly Michael

Personal details
- Born: Madeleine Elise Westerhout; October 8, 1990 (age 36) Newport Beach, California, U.S.
- Party: Republican
- Education: College of Charleston (BA)

Madeleine Elise Westerhout (born October 8, 1990) is an American former political aide who served in the first Trump administration. She was initially the personal secretary to Donald Trump from 2017 to 2019, before being named director of Oval Office Operations at the White House, a role she served in from February to August 2019. She was fired after Trump learned she had shared details of his family and Oval Office operations with reporters during an off-the-record dinner earlier that month.

== Early life ==
Westerhout was born in Newport Beach, California, and grew up primarily in Irvine, California. She studied at the College of Charleston in Charleston, South Carolina, receiving a BA degree in political science in 2013. After her graduation, she moved to Washington, D.C., and worked as a fitness trainer in the Pure Barre gym of Carrie Rezabek Dorr.

== Career ==
In the 2012 presidential election, Westerhout worked for the campaign of Mitt Romney. In 2013, she worked for candidate John R. Kuhn in the Republican primary for the special election in South Carolina's first congressional district. Later that year, she interned for Congressman John Campbell. In the summer of 2013, Westerhout began working for the Republican National Committee and the Republican Party Organizing Committee. From January 2015, she worked as an assistant to RNC chief of staff Katie Walsh.

On January 19, 2017, Donald Trump's transition team announced that Westerhout would serve as special assistant and executive assistant to the President. A June 2018 release of White House salary data revealed that Westerhout was paid US$130,000 for the position. In February 2019, Westerhout called a leak of Trump's schedule a "disgraceful breach of trust." The same month, she was promoted to Director of Oval Office Operations, at US$145,000 annually. Trump often referred to her as "my beauty."

On August 29, 2019, she was fired after it was revealed that she had shared details about the Trump family and White House operations to reporters – reportedly while intoxicated – at an off the record dinner. Politico reported she was fired because she boasted of having a better relationship with Trump than his daughters did, and that she said Trump disliked being photographed with daughter Tiffany Trump because he considered her overweight. Two days later, Trump posted a tweet in which he cited Westerhout's "fully enforceable confidentiality agreement" but clarified that Westerhout "is a very good person and I don't think there would ever be reason to use it." In the same tweet, Trump claimed that Westerhout "called me yesterday to apologize, had a bad night. I fully understood and forgave her!" In August 2020, she released a memoir on her time in the Oval Office, entitled Off the Record.

On May 9, 2024, under subpoena, she testified during the Trump hush money case about her time working at the White House, stating that checks were delivered to the White House by Trump Organization employees to be signed by Trump.

As of 2026, Westerhout is a vice president of the American Global Strategies consulting firm, as well as the chief of staff to the chairman, Robert C. O'Brien.

== Bibliography ==
- Westerhout, Madeleine (2020). Off the Record: Picking Up the Pieces After Losing My Dream Job at the White House. New York: Center Street. ISBN 978-1-5460-5970-7.

== See also ==
- Timeline of the Donald Trump presidency (2017 Q1)
- Timeline of the Donald Trump presidency (2019 Q2)
- Timeline of the Donald Trump presidency (2019 Q3)
