= Timeline of the first Trump presidency (2019 Q4) =

The following is a timeline of the first presidency of Donald Trump during the fourth and last quarter of 2019, from October 1 to December 31, 2019. For a complete itinerary of his travels, see List of presidential trips made by Donald Trump (2019). To navigate between quarters, see timeline of the Donald Trump presidencies.

== Overview ==
The fourth quarter of Donald Trump's presidency was largely dominated by his impeachment scandal.

== Timeline ==
=== October 2019 ===
Date	Events	Photos/videos
Tuesday, October 1	President Trump accuses the impeachment inquiry against him of being a coup d'état, designed to strip Americans of their freedoms.; Secretary of State Mike Pompeo calls congressional demands for interviews in front of committees "an act of intimidation".	
Wednesday, October 2	President Trump holds a bilateral meeting and joint press conference with Finnish president Sauli Niinistö at the White House. While responding to reporters about the impeachment inquiry, President Trump calls Adam Schiff a "low life" and the whistle-blower's source a "spy".; After previously evading questions, Secretary of State Mike Pompeo admits he was a listener on the July 25 phone call between President Trump and Ukrainian president Volodymyr Zelenskyy.; President Trump expresses interest in building an electrified moat filled with alligators along the southern border with Mexico, forcing his aides to find a cost estimate. He also proposes shooting migrants in the legs in order to slow them down and threatens to close the 2,000 mile border with Mexico in an effort to control immigration.; White House officials tell reporters that President Trump frequently engaged Vice President Mike Pence in the president's efforts to pressure Ukrainian president Volodymyr Zelenskyy to find damning information on Joe Biden and his son, Hunter.	A Joint Press Conference with President Trump and Finnish president Sauli Niinistö
Thursday, October 3	President Trump publicly urges China and Ukrainian president Volodymyr Zelenskyy to investigate former Vice President Joe Biden and his family on national television.	
Friday, October 4		
Saturday, October 5		
Sunday, October 6	A second whistle-blower comes forward to the U.S. intelligence community with corroborating first-hand information concerning President Trump's call with Ukrainian president Volodymyr Zelenskyy.	
Monday, October 7	President Trump signs the U.S.–Japan trade agreement.; President Trump announces a Sunday night decision to withdraw U.S. special forces from northeastern Syria.; The House Intelligence, Foreign Affairs and Oversight committees subpoena the Department of Defense and the White House Office of Management and Budget for documents related to Ukraine.; The Trump administration announces it is adding 28 Chinese corporations to a blacklist over concerns of the role the companies played in human rights violations, barring American companies from doing business with these companies.	President Trump signs the U.S.–Japan trade agreement.
Tuesday, October 8	President Trump presents the Presidential Medal of Freedom to former Attorney General Edwin Meese.; The House announces that it will subpoena Gordon Sondland to testify and hand over any documents to the Impeachment inquiry after the State Department blocked Sondland's testimony.; The Trump administration announces in a letter to Speaker of the House Nancy Pelosi that it will not cooperate in any way with the impeachment inquiry, calling it "illegitimate" and "dangerous", effectively challenging Congress's constitutional power.	President Trump awards the Presidential Medal of Freedom to Edwin Meese
Wednesday, October 9		
Thursday, October 10	President Trump holds a rally in Minneapolis, Minnesota.; Michael McKinley resigns his position as senior advisor to Secretary of State Mike Pompeo.	
Friday, October 11	President Trump holds a rally in Lake Charles, Louisiana.; Acting Secretary of Homeland Security Kevin McAleenan, the fourth person to serve in that post during the Trump presidency, resigns. "Kevin McAleenan has done an outstanding job." President Trump tweets that he will announce a replacement in the coming days.; Secretary of State Mike Pompeo defends President Trump's phone call with the Ukrainian president and accuses Democratic members of Congress of "trying to take down this president", saying that is commonplace to ask allies to "do things for us".; Former U.S. Ambassador to Ukraine Marie Yovanovitch, in defiance of a White House ban on cooperating with Congress, tells the House impeachment inquiry that Trump personally pressured the State Department to have her ousted from her position.	
Saturday, October 12		
Sunday, October 13		
Monday, October 14	President Trump falsely claims that Kurdish soldiers—former allies in the War against ISIS—are releasing ISIS POWs during the Turkish invasion of Syria following President Trump's order for U.S. troops to vacate the country.; President Trump announces sanctions on Turkey following backlash from Republican Party congressmen over the president's withdrawal of American troops stationed in Syria.; Fiona Hill, past senior official for Russia and Europe on the National Security Council, testifies for nine hours before House panels regarding a July 10 meeting with senior Ukrainian officials, then-National Security Adviser John Bolton, and other U.S. officials including U.S. ambassador to the European Union, Gordon Sondland.	
Tuesday, October 15	President Trump entertains the St. Louis Blues, 2019 Stanley Cup champions, at the White House.; George Kent, deputy assistant secretary of state responsible for Ukraine, testifies in the House impeachment inquiry of President Trump.	President Trump with the St. Louis Blues
Wednesday, October 16	President Trump holds a bilateral meeting and joint press conference with Italian president Sergio Mattarella at the White House.; The House of Representatives formally condemns President Trump's withdrawal of troops from Syria by a vote of 354–60.; President Trump holds a White House meeting with key Democrats and Republicans on Syria. After the meeting, House Speaker Nancy Pelosi and some Democrats contend that the president was "having a meltdown", calling the speaker a "third-rate politician".; Special Envoy to Ukraine Kurt Volker and Michael McKinley, recently resigned senior adviser to Secretary of State Mike Pompeo, testify in closed-door sessions before the House impeachment inquiry.	A Joint Press Conference between President Trump and Italian president Sergio Mattarella
Thursday, October 17	Vice President Mike Pence and Turkish president Recep Tayyip Erdoğan agree to a ceasefire regarding the Turkish invasion of Kurdish-held northeastern Syria.; Acting White House chief of staff Mick Mulvaney confirms Trump blocked military aid to Ukraine in order to force investigation of his political rivals. Mulvaney called the quid pro quo exchange "absolutely appropriate" and "we do that all the time with foreign policy."; Acting White House chief of staff Mick Mulvaney defends President Trump's decision to hold the 2020 G-7 summit at the Trump National Doral Miami Golf Club.; President Trump holds a rally in Dallas, Texas.; Energy Secretary Rick Perry informs President Trump of his plans to resign.; Ambassador to the European Union, Gordon Sondland, testifies before the House impeachment inquiry.	Press Briefing with White House Acting Chief of Staff Mick Mulvaney
Friday, October 18		
Saturday, October 19	In response to fierce criticism from Congress, President Trump announces on Twitter that he will no longer be holding the 2020 G-7 summit at Trump National Doral Miami, instead considering Camp David as a possible alternative.	
Sunday, October 20		
Monday, October 21	Russ Vought, acting director of the Office of Management and Budget, refuses to testify in the House impeachment inquiry.; During an interview on Fox News with Sean Hannity, Donald Trump says both The New York Times and The Washington Post treat him terribly with very negative stories and that he will cancel White House subscriptions to these newspapers.	
Tuesday, October 22	Bill Taylor, an American diplomat to Ukraine, testifies to the House impeachment inquiry that President Trump directed officials to deny foreign aid to Ukraine if the country would refuse to open an investigation into Joe Biden and his son.; Kelly Ann Shaw, a senior woman on President Trump's economic team, announces she will be leaving as deputy assistant to the president for international economic affairs and deputy director of the National Economic Council.; White House press secretary Stephanie Grisham confirms Trump's statements and says the White House is cancelling subscriptions to two both The Washington Post and The New York Times.	
Wednesday, October 23	President Trump announces the removal of sanctions against Turkey, resulting from the negotiation of a ceasefire on Turkey's invasion of Kurdish-held Syria. President Trump also says American involvement in Syria is over, adding that he will "let someone else fight over this long bloodstained sand".; Deputy Assistant Secretary of Defense Laura Cooper, a Pentagon official in charge of Ukraine policy, testifies to the House Impeachment inquiry after a five-hour delay.	President Trump announces the Turkish invasion of Syria
Thursday, October 24	President Trump presents the Presidential Medal of Freedom to Roger Penske.; A federal judge holds that Education Secretary Betsy DeVos is in contempt of court for violating an order to stop collecting on student loans.	President Trump awards the Presidential Medal of Freedom to Roger Penske
Friday, October 25		
Saturday, October 26	Philip T. Reeker, acting assistant secretary of state, testifies to the House impeachment inquiry that he was unaware of President Trump's request for an investigation of the Bidens by Ukrainian authorities until the whistle-blower report was made public.	
Sunday, October 27	President Trump confirms that ISIS leader Abu Bakr al-Baghdadi detonated an explosive vest in a confrontation with American troops in northwest Syria, killing himself and three of his six children.	President Trump announces the death of ISIS leader Abu Bakr al-Baghdadi
Monday, October 28	Charles Kupperman, former deputy national security advisor, defies a congressional subpoena and fails to appear for a deposition before House impeachment investigators. Kupperman, who listened in to the July 25 telephone call between President Trump and Ukrainian president Zelenskyy, sought guidance from a federal judge about whether he should testify. In an effort to prevent Kupperman from testifying, President Trump invoked constitutional immunity, thereby preventing Kupperman from testifying to Congress.; President Trump and First Lady Melania Trump participate in the White House Halloween event.	President Trump and First Lady Melania Trump greet trick-or-treaters during the White House Halloween event
Tuesday, October 29	Director of the National Security Council (NSA) Lieutenant Colonel Alexander S. Vindman testifies to the House Impeachment inquiry about outside influencers who promoted "a false and alternative narrative" that was not helpful "to U.S. national security".	
Wednesday, October 30	President Trump presents the Medal of Honor to Army Master Sergeant Matthew O. Williams.; Catherine Croft, a State Department Ukraine expert and National Security Council (NSC) staff member, testifies to the House Impeachment inquiry. Christopher J. Anderson, a career Foreign Service officer, testifies later in the day.; Timothy Morrison, a top adviser for Russian and European affairs, announces that he is leaving his job. He is scheduled to testify before the House impeachment investigators the following day.	President Trump awards the Medal of Honor to Master Sergeant Matthew O. Williams
Thursday, October 31	The House of Representatives votes to formally endorse the impeachment inquiry 232–196, mostly along partisan lines. White House press secretary Stephanie Grisham condemns the vote, calling the inquiry a "a blatantly partisan attempt to destroy the president".; Timothy Morrison testifies to the House impeachment inquiry that he was informed that President Trump wanted Ukrainian officials to launch an investigation to help him in return for American aid to the country.	

=== November 2019 ===
Date	Events	Photos/videos
Friday, November 1	President Trump holds a rally in Tupelo, Mississippi.; Chad Wolf, a key architect of the Trump administration's "zero tolerance" immigration policy, is appointed as the latest acting secretary of the Department of Homeland Security.	
Saturday, November 2		
Sunday, November 3	President Trump blames Governor Gavin Newsom for the many wildfires that are currently raging across California and threatens to withhold funding to fight the fires on Twitter. Trump tweets that Newsom has "done a terrible job of forest management", causing the string of recent fires. Of the 33 million acres of forest in California, 57% is controlled by the federal government.	
Monday, November 4	President Trump holds a rally in Lexington, Kentucky.; National Security Council attorneys John Eisenberg and Michael Ellis, along with senior advisor to chief of staff Mick Mulvaney and assistant to the president Robert Blair, and Brian McCormick, an official at the Office of Management and Budget were scheduled to testify at the Impeachment inquiry. All four fail to show.; The House committees leading the Impeachment inquiry begin releasing transcripts from last months closed-door testimonies beginning with former Ambassador to Ukraine Marie Yovanovitch and former State Department official Michael McKinley.	
Tuesday, November 5	The House committees release transcripts from Gordon Sondland, the United States ambassador to the European Union, and Kurt Volker, the former special envoy to Ukraine.	
Wednesday, November 6	President Trump holds a rally in Monroe, Louisiana.; The House committees release the transcript from the former ambassador to Ukraine, Bill Taylor.	
Thursday, November 7	A New York State Judge orders President Trump to pay two million dollars to various non-profit organizations for his abuse of the Trump Foundation to advance his 2016 presidential campaign.; Former national security advisor John Bolton fails to appear before the House impeachment inquiry to give a testimony. The inquiry decides not to issue a subpoena though, as Bolton's attorney threatened to go to court if one was issued.; Jennifer Williams, a national security aide to Vice-president Mike Pence, testifies in the ongoing House impeachment inquiry while the White House tries to prevent her from giving a deposition. George Kent, a State Department official, also testifies.	
Friday, November 8		
Saturday, November 9	President Trump announces that he will release the transcript of a second phone call with Ukrainian president Volodymyr Zelenskyy.	
Sunday, November 10		
Monday, November 11	President Trump participates in the Veterans Day parade in New York City, among other events.	President Trump addresses an audience at the New York City Veterans Day Parade
Tuesday, November 12	President Trump delivers remarks to the Economic Club of New York.	President Trump delivers remarks to the Economic Club of New York
Wednesday, November 13	In the first day of public broadcast of the Trump Impeachment Hearing, the House Intelligence Committee hears testimony from William Taylor, the top diplomat in Ukraine, and George Kent, a senior State Department official.; President Trump holds a bilateral meeting and joint press conference with Turkish President Recep Tayyip Erdoğan at the White House.	A Joint Press Conference with President Trump and Turkish President Recep Tayyip Erdoğan
Thursday, November 14	President Trump holds a bilateral meeting with NATO Secretary General Jens Stoltenberg at the White House.; President Trump holds a rally in Bossier City, Louisiana.; A mass shooting occurs at Saugus High School in Santa Clarita, California, killing two and injuring three others. The suspect, 16 year-old Nathaniel Berhow is critically injured and dies the next day.	
Friday, November 15	Marie Yovanovitch testifies for a second time before the House Intelligence Committee about her recollections surrounding President Trump's July 25 phone call with Ukrainian president Volodymyr Zelenskyy. Yovanovitch claims Rudy Giuliani and others "with questionable motives" led a "campaign of disinformation". President Trump attacks Yovanovitch on Twitter, even as she testifies about feeling threatened by his July 25 comments, which Yovanovitch called "very intimidating".; David Holmes, a career diplomat and the political counselor at the embassy in Kyiv, testifies before lawmakers in a closed-door meeting as part of the House Impeachment inquiry. He claimed to have overheard President Trump talking with a U.S. Ambassador Sondland.; In an attempt to clear himself, President Trump releases a rough transcript of the first phone call between Trump and Ukrainian president Zelenskyy, which occurred on April 21.	
Saturday, November 16	Mark Sandy, a senior career official at the Office of Management and Budget (OMB) testifies privately to the House impeachment inquiry that he did not understand why American aid to Ukraine had been delayed, adding that he had never before encountered a similar situation during his time at the OMB.; Jennifer Williams, an aide to Vice President Mike Pence, testifies in closed-door session under subpoena before the House Impeachment inquiry; President Trump makes an unscheduled visit to Walter Reed National Military Medical Center to "begin portions of his routine annual physical exam" that included a "quick exam and labs", according to the White House.	
Sunday, November 17		
Monday, November 18		
Tuesday, November 19	Lieutenant Colonel Alexander Vindman, Department of State official Jennifer Williams, former U.S. Ambassador to NATO Kurt Volker and advisor to the president Tim Morrison all testify publicly before the House impeachment inquiry. Volker changes his previous testimony after learning that "a great deal of new information" had been revealed.	
Wednesday, November 20	President Trump visits an Apple manufacturing plant in Austin, Texas.; U.S. Ambassador to the European Union Gordon Sondland testifies publicly to the House impeachment inquiry that he worked with Rudy Giuliani to pressure Ukraine to investigate Joe Biden at the "express direction of the president".; Laura Cooper, a top Pentagon official, and David Hale, the undersecretary of state for political affairs, testify publicly to the House impeachment inquiry that Ukrainian officials knew about delayed American aid as early as July, undermining President Trump's defense that there was no "quid pro quo".	President Trump speaks to workers at the Apple plant in Austin, Texas
Thursday, November 21	Former advisor to the president Fiona Hill testifies publicly to the House impeachment inquiry that President Trump's pressure on Ukrainian officials to open investigations into his rivals was a "domestic political errand" which damaged American foreign policy, refuting the "fictional narrative" presented by President Trump and his allies. Diplomat David Holmes also testifies publicly to the House impeachment inquiry about a conversation he overheard between Ambassador Sondland and President Trump in which the president repeatedly sought information concerning the investigations into the 2016 presidential election.; General John E. Hyten is sworn in as Vice Chairman of the Joint Chiefs of Staff.	
Friday, November 22		
Saturday, November 23		
Sunday, November 24	Secretary of the Navy Richard V. Spencer is fired by Secretary of Defense Mark Esper over a dispute between President Trump and Spencer after the president intervened in the war crimes trial of Chief Petty Officer Eddie Gallagher, a Navy SEAL commando.	
Monday, November 25	First Lady Melania Trump welcomes the arrival of the White House Christmas tree at the White House for the third time.; President Trump welcomes Conan to the White House.; President Trump holds a bilateral meeting with Bulgarian prime minister Boyko Borisov at the White House.; A federal judge rules that former White House counsel Don McGahn must be allowed to testify to the House impeachment inquiry, overruling President Trump's assertion of executive privilege over McGahn, adding that "presidents are not kings."	First Lady Melania Trump receives the 2019 White House Christmas tree President Trump and Bulgarian prime minister Boyko Borisov
Tuesday, November 26	President Trump and First Lady Melania Trump participate in the National Thanksgiving Turkey Presentation.; President Trump holds a rally in Sunrise, Florida.; Chairman of the House Judiciary Committee Jerrold Nadler invites President Trump and his legal counsel to participate in the impeachment inquiry, allowing him to ask questions of witnesses.	President Trump and First Lady Melania Trump pardon a turkey named "Butter"
Wednesday, November 27		
Thursday, November 28	President Trump makes an unannounced Thanksgiving visit in order to meet with American troops stationed in a combat zone at Bagram Airfield in Afghanistan.	President Trump visits American troops at Bagram Airfield in Afghanistan
Friday, November 29		
Saturday, November 30		

=== December 2019 ===
Date	Events	Photos/videos
Sunday, December 1	President Trump's legal team announces that they will not accept the House Judiciary Committee's invitation to participate in the impeachment inquiry over complaints that the inquiry lacked "any semblance of a fair process".; Today is Secretary of Energy Rick Perry's official last day, following his previous letter of resignation to President Trump.	
Monday, December 2	First Lady Melania Trump unveils the Christmas decorations at the White House for the third time.; President Trump arrives in London for the upcoming NATO summit.; The Senate confirms Dan Brouillette, a former lobbyist for Ford Motor Company as the next secretary of energy, succeeding Rick Perry.	First Lady Melania Trump unveils the 2019 Christmas decorations
Tuesday, December 3	President Trump holds bilateral meetings with NATO secretary general Jens Stoltenberg, French president Emmanuel Macron and Canadian prime minister Justin Trudeau.; President Trump and First Lady Melania Trump attend a NATO dinner hosted by Queen Elizabeth II at Buckingham Palace.; In a 300-page report the House Intelligence Committee accuses President Trump of placing his "personal and political interests above the national interests of the United States" and jeopardizing national security through his requesting of foreign assistance to aid his political campaign.	Group photo of NATO leaders before a dinner at Buckingham Palace
Wednesday, December 4	President Trump holds bilateral meetings with German chancellor Angela Merkel, Danish prime minister Mette Frederiksen and Italian prime minister Giuseppe Conte, cancels a scheduled press conference and leaves the Nato summit early.; The House impeachment inquiry invites four legal scholars to testify whether President Trump's actions concerning Ukraine warranted impeachment. Three scholars said the president's actions did require impeachment, saying that Trump's conduct was worse than any preceding president. One scholar did not agree with the others, adding that impeachment would set a "dangerous precedent" in future impeachments.	President Trump and NATO leaders
Thursday, December 5	Speaker of the House Nancy Pelosi announces that the House committee chairmen will proceed with articles of impeachment against President Trump, adding that the "President leaves us no choice".	
Friday, December 6		
Saturday, December 7		
Sunday, December 8		
Monday, December 9	The House impeachment inquiry hears arguments both for and against impeachment of President Trump from Republican and Democratic lawyers, who argue that "the Democrats are obsessed with impeaching President Trump" and the evidence against the president "is overwhelming", respectively.; The Democratic members of the House of Representatives announces that it will release articles of impeachment against President Trump on December 10.	
Tuesday, December 10	President Trump meets with Russian foreign minister Sergey Lavrov.; President Trump holds a rally in Hershey, Pennsylvania.; House Democratic leaders release two articles of impeachment against President Trump, contempt of Congress and abuse of power.	President Trump with Russian foreign minister Sergey Lavrov
Wednesday, December 11	President Trump signs an executive order defining Judaism as a nationality or race, not just as a religion, in response to increased anti-Semitism in universities.	
Thursday, December 12		
Friday, December 13	The House Judiciary committee votes along party lines to approve the two articles of impeachment against President Trump, sending the articles to the House floor for further debate and voting.; President Trump holds a bilateral meeting with Paraguayan president Mario Abdo Benítez at the White House.	President Trump and Paraguayan president Mario Abdo Benítez
Saturday, December 14	President Trump takes part in the coin toss for his second Army–Navy Game as commander-in-chief.	
Sunday, December 15		
Monday, December 16		
Tuesday, December 17	President Trump holds a bilateral meeting with Guatemalan president Jimmy Morales at the White House.	President Trump and Guatemalan president Jimmy Morales
Wednesday, December 18	President Trump holds a rally in Battle Creek, Michigan.; President Trump is impeached by the House of Representatives on charges of "abuse of power" in a vote of 230–197 and "obstruction of Congress" in a vote of 229–198.	First impeachment of President Trump
Thursday, December 19	Acting U.S. Ambassador to Ukraine William Taylor, a key witness in the congressional impeachment inquiry into President Trump, announces that he will step down from his post and leave Kyiv before Secretary of State Mike Pompeo visits in early January 2020.; The United States–Mexico–Canada Agreement (USMCA), President Trump's replacement for the North American Free Trade Agreement (NAFTA), is passed by the House of Representatives in a vote of 385–41.; Christianity Today, a conservative evangelical Christian magazine, publishes an editorial calling for President Trump to be "removed from office" due to his violation of the Constitution and "profoundly immoral actions".	
Friday, December 20	The First Family depart Washington for an extended Holiday stay at President Trump's Mar-a-Lago resort in Palm Beach, Florida.	
Saturday, December 21	President Trump complains that windmills are "very expensive", claiming that they "kill many bald eagles" and that "he has studied [wind power] better than anybody" during a speech to a group of young conservative supporters in West Palm Beach, Florida.	
Sunday, December 22		
Monday, December 23		
Tuesday, December 24		
Wednesday, December 25	The President and First Lady share their 2019 Christmas message to the country.	
Thursday, December 26		
Friday, December 27	President Trump retweets an article from the Washington Examiner that contains the name of the alleged whistle-blower who started his impeachment inquiry. Legal experts disagree on whether a tweet that reveals the name of a whistle-blower violates the Intelligence Community Whistleblower Protection Act, as the law forbids individuals from retaliating against whistle-blowers, but not from revealing their names.; The Federal Reserve releases a study showing that President Trump's tariffs have led to both job losses and higher consumer prices.; The K-1 Air Base in Iraq, which hosts Iraqi and U.S. military personnel, is attacked, killing an American contractor.	
Saturday, December 28		
Sunday, December 29	The U.S. Department of Defense reports a series of airstrikes against Kata'ib Hezbollah's weapons depots and command centers in Iraq and Syria, reportedly killing at least 25 militiamen and wounding 55 more.	
Monday, December 30		
Tuesday, December 31	The American embassy in Iraq is attacked by protestors angered by U.S. air strikes targeting the Iran-backed militia group, Kataib Hezbollah.; President Trump calls the impeachment proceedings against him in Congress a "big fat hoax" and says the Senate trial would go "very quick".	

== See also ==
- First 100 days of the first Trump presidency – Period from January to April 2017
- List of executive actions by Donald Trump
- Lists of presidential trips made by Donald Trump (international trips)
- First presidential transition of Donald Trump – Transfer of presidential power from Barack Obama to Donald Trump
- Timeline of the 2016 United States presidential election

U.S. presidential administration timelines
Preceded by First Trump presidency (2019 Q3)	First Trump presidency (2019 Q4)	Succeeded by First Trump presidency (2020 Q1)
