= Louis H. Poock =

German-American banker, educator and city official (1839–1897)

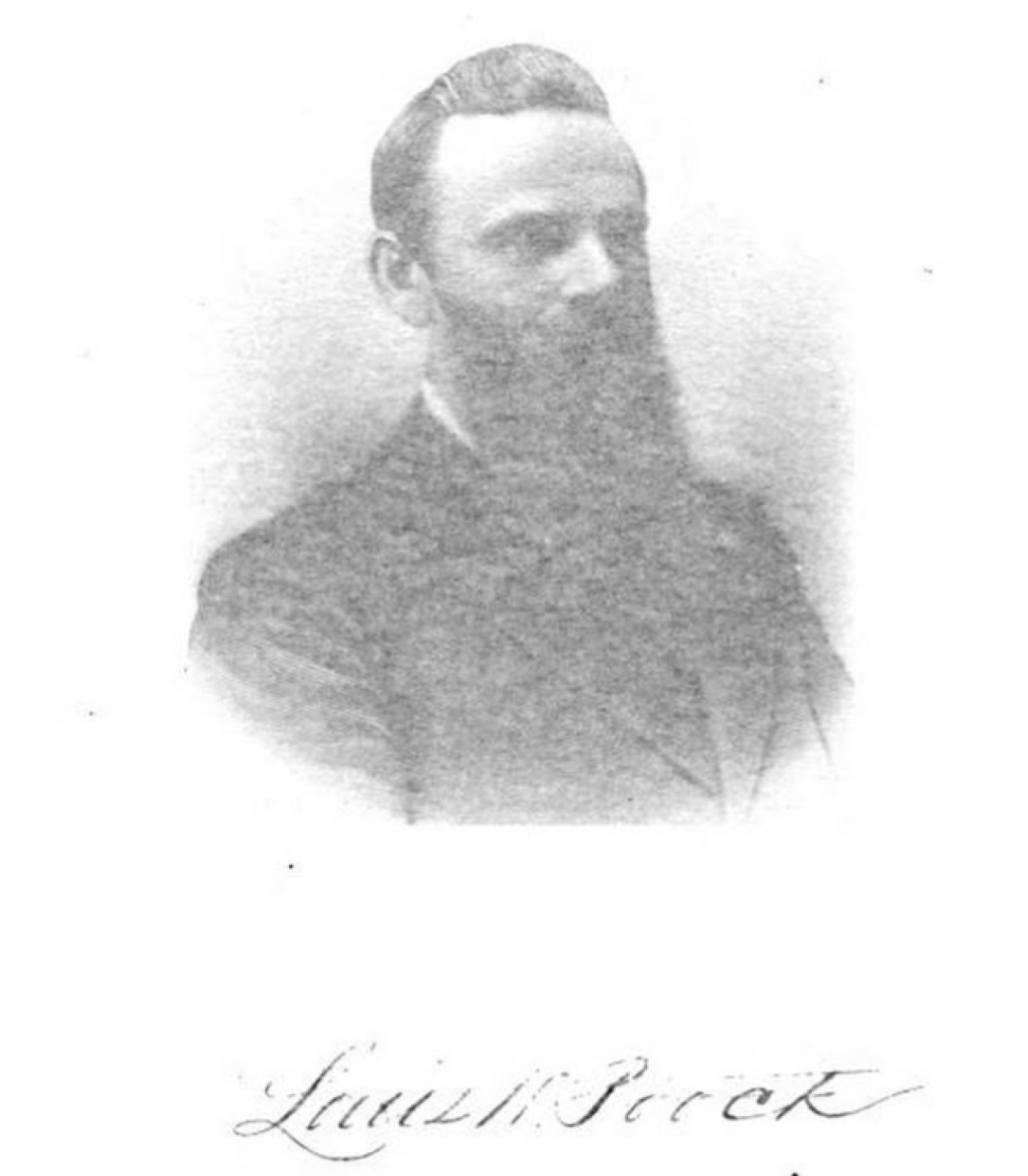
- Poock, date unknown
- Born: March 19, 1839; Hanover, Germany
- Died: September 12, 1897 (aged 58); Dayton, Ohio, US
- Occupations: Banker, City Treasurer
- Spouse: Minnie Pook (née Lucking)

Louis Heinrich Poock (March 19, 1839 – September 12, 1897) was a German-American banker, educator and city official. He served as vice-president of the Dayton, Ohio board of education, a secretary of Dayton Building Association, and a treasurer of Ohio's Germania Building Association. He established one of Dayton's most prominent financier families.

== Early life ==
Poock was born on March 19, 1839, in Hanover, Germany. His father, Frederick Ludwig Poock, worked as a building inspector at Arnts-Zimmermeister county. His mother, Fredericka Poock (née Katz), was a housewife, most likely of Jewish-Ashkenazi ancestry. Poock was the youngest child in his family. His father died in 1842. Twelve years after his death his remaining family immigrated to Dayton, Ohio. Louis received his primary education in a school in Germany, so he spoke very little English. Because of that he worked as a manual worker in Dayton at jobs that did not require English language fluency. In 1857, after working at the factory of Blanchard & Brown as an apprentice, Poock was involved in an industrial accident resulting in a permanent injury to his left hand, preventing him from performing manual labour. The disability has changed Poock's course of life, pushing him to complete his education. He first attended a grammar school and then a high school in Dayton. After completing his high school education he attended Grier's Commercial College, where he obtained a degree in accounting. He was appointed substitute deputy in the office of the county auditor, later serving as a book-keeper at the Dayton city government offices.

== Career ==
=== Educator ===
In September 1862, he started working as a teacher of German language in the Twelfth District school. After three years of service, he became a German language instructor in the Sixth District school, where he remained until December 1874. While working as a teacher, he conducted many extra-curriculum classes to assist children who needed additional help.

In April 1875, he was elected to Dayton's Board of Education. He was later appointed a vice-president of Dayton's Board of Education in 1879.

=== City official ===
In 1880, Poock was appointed to serve as a deputy county treasurer, working under Treasurer H. H. Laubach. He later served in the same position under Stephen J. Allen. He served two terms as county treasurer, a serving in this capacity until September 1888.

=== Financier ===
In January 1868, Poock was appointed to serve as a secretary of Dayton Building Association. After organization's closure in 1873, Poock was elected to serve as a secretary of the Concordia Building and Loan Association, serving in this capacity until April 1875. In April 1873, Poock and partners have established Germania Building Association where he served as secretary and a treasurer.

In February 1883, Poock was appointed to serve as a director of Dayton Savings Bank, as well as being one of the bank's major stockholders. On January 7, 1885, he was elected to serve as a president of the bank, remaining in this office until 1889. In 1889 he established Teutonia National Bank, where he served as a Chief Cashier (equivalent to CFO).

== Legacy ==
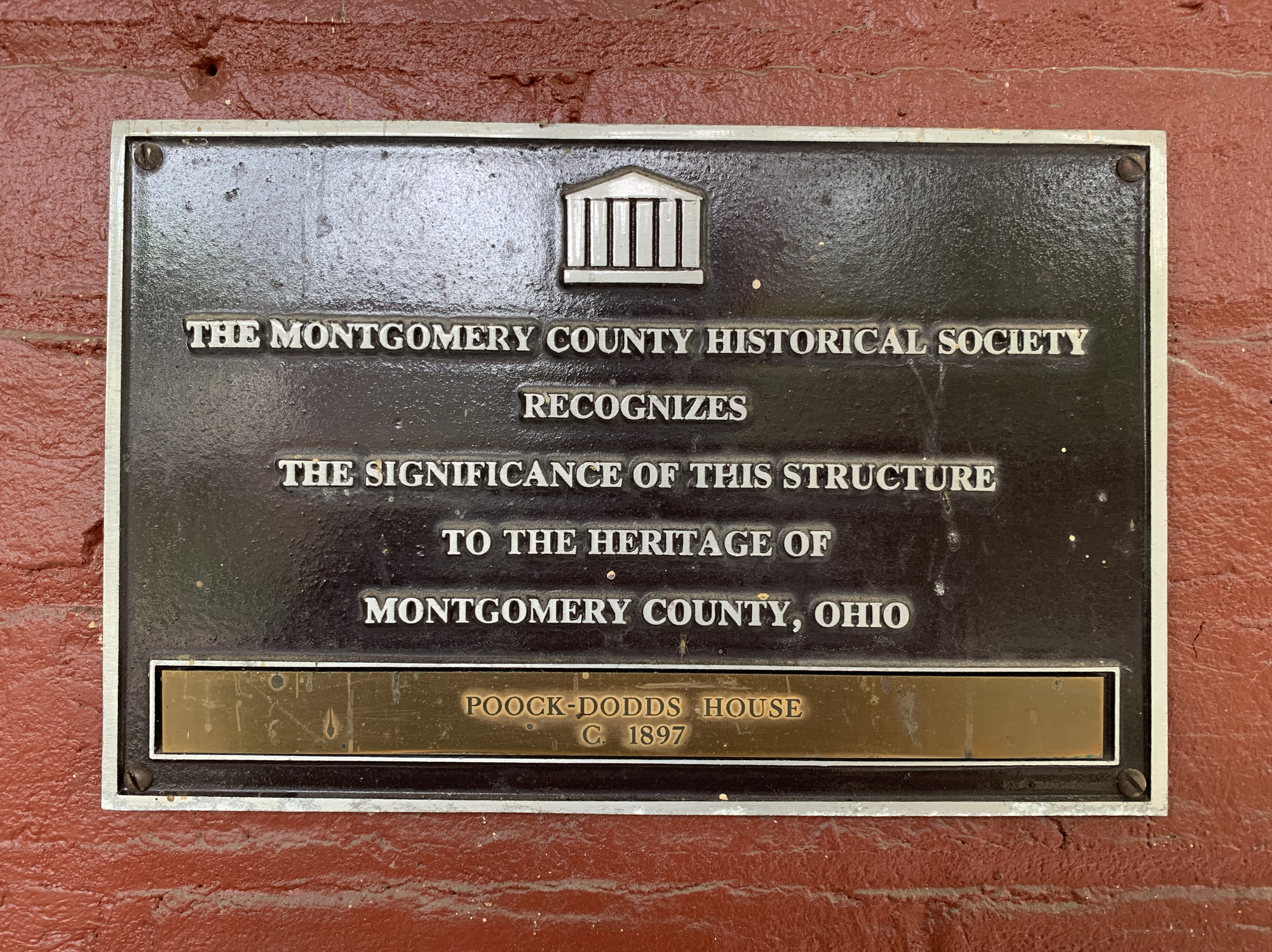

In March 1897, a few months before his death, Poock completed construction of one of the largest residential buildings in Dayton's Oregon Historic District. The building, located at 33 Hess Street, still bears the name of his son, Christian Poock on a copper plate displayed on the house's facade, who was among dozens who perished in 1913 Great Dayton Flood.
