= 2019 Dayton shooting =

Mass shooting in Ohio, U.S.

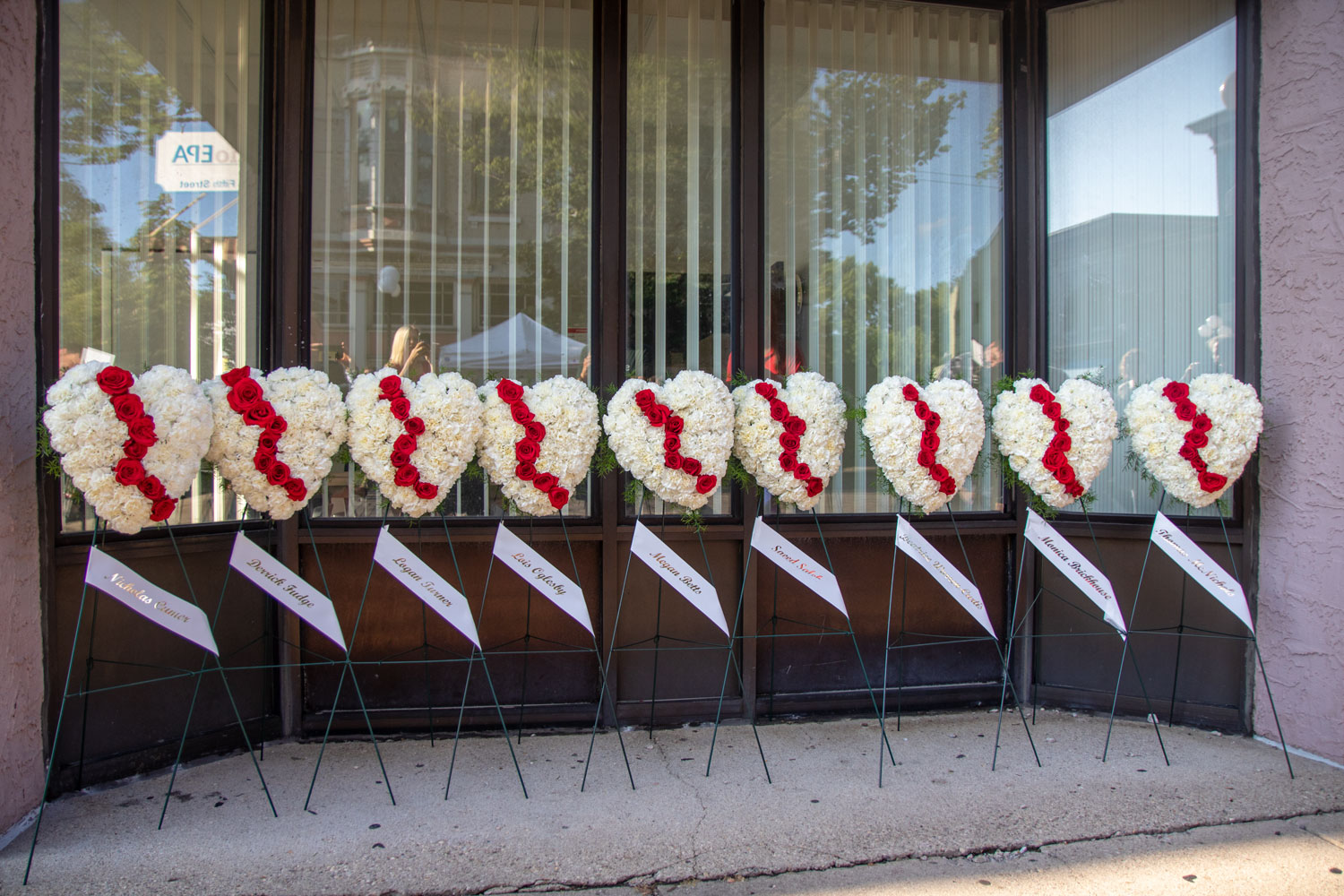
- A memorial site commemorating the victims of the shooting

- Map of the events of the shooting within the Oregon Historic District
- Location: 39.7572°N 84.1843°W; Ned Peppers Bar; 419 East 5th Street; Dayton, Ohio, U.S.
- Date: August 4, 2019 c. 1:05 – 1:06 a.m. (EDT UTC−04:00)
- Target: People near Ned Peppers Bar
- Attack type: Mass shooting; mass murder; fratricide
- Weapons: Anderson Manufacturing AR-15 style pistol; 12-gauge Harrington & Richardson Pardner Pump pump-action shotgun (unused; left in car)
- Deaths: 10 (including the perpetrator)
- Injuries: 27 (17 from gunfire)
- Perpetrator: Connor Stephen Betts
- Motive: Inconclusive, likely homicidal ideation, suicidal ideation and mental illness

On August 4, 2019, 24-year-old Connor Betts shot and killed nine people, including his brother, (Note: Despite being labeled as female in some sources, the perpetrator's brother identified as a trans man.) and wounded 17 others near the entrance of the Ned Peppers Bar in the Oregon Historic District of Dayton, Ohio, United States. Betts was fatally shot by responding police officers 32 seconds after the first shots were fired. A total of 27 people were taken to area hospitals. It is the deadliest mass shooting to occur in Ohio since the 1975 Easter Sunday massacre.

A search of the shooter's home found evidence that showed an interest in violence and mass shootings and that he had expressed a desire to commit one. He considered himself a leftist and voiced his support for Antifa; a preliminary assessment did not indicate that Betts had a racial or political motive. The attack occurred just 13 hours after a mass shooting at a Walmart in El Paso, Texas.

== Shooting ==
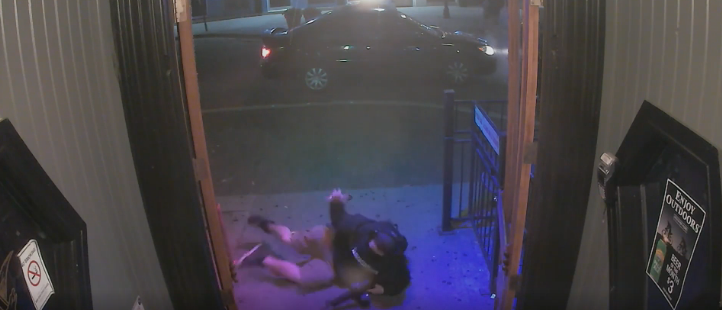
CCTV still of Betts being shot by law enforcement at the entrance of Ned Peppers Bar

Two hours before the shooting, the gunman was seen entering Blind Bob's, a bar on East 5th Street in the downtown Oregon Historic District of Dayton, accompanied by his brother and a friend. At about 12:13 a.m., Betts split from the two and was recorded leaving Blind Bob's. Betts then went to the nearby Ned Peppers Bar, where he stayed for about 30 minutes. During this time, Betts texted his friend to come to Ned Peppers along with his brother. The friend replied to Betts that he was at Blind Bob's with Bett's brother, that he was going to get tacos with him, and that he was going to leave after an hour.

Betts eventually left the Ned Peppers Bar at 12:44 a.m. and headed to his car, which was parked behind the nearby Thai 9 restaurant. There, Betts took out several items from the trunk of his car. He put on body armor, a jacket for the band The Acacia Strain, a balaclava-type mask, earmuffs, and a backpack before walking to an alleyway that runs next to Blind Bob's, stopping behind the bar for about nine minutes to ready his gun and the rest of his outfit. An ejected live round from the shooter's firearm was later discovered in that location by police.

The shooting began at around 1:05 a.m., when Betts began walking north towards East 5th Street. He was carrying an AR-pattern pistol chambered in .223 Remington and equipped with a 100-round drum magazine. As Betts walked up the alley, he encountered a man who was returning to his car behind the bar; Betts did not shoot him, and the two even greeted each other. The man noticed Betts wearing hearing protection and a mask. Soon after, Betts reached the intersection with East 5th Street, encountering and firing four shots at Saeed Saleh, killing him. The bullets also fatally struck Betts' brother and wounded his friend, who were standing in line at a taco cart in front of Blind Bob's.

Betts moved east down the south sidewalk of East 5th Street, passing by the crowded patio of Blind Bob's and ignoring his brother's screams for help. Betts aimed his AR pistol down the sidewalk and fired eight shots, killing Lois Oglesby and injuring six others. Betts then turned north and walked between two parked trucks, on the other side of which he encountered Derrick Fudge, whom he killed with three shots. Betts then crossed the street and fired three more shots, injuring a woman and striking a car, then moved east again towards the entrance of Ned Peppers as he fired twenty-three shots in two volleys down the sidewalk, killing five people—Logan Turner, Nicholas Cumer, Thomas McNichols, Monica Brickhouse, and Beatrice Warren-Curtis—and wounding ten others. Brickhouse and Warren-Curtis were on the ground trying to roll away from Betts when they were shot and killed; they were the final victims of the shooting.

Betts then started running towards the entrance of the Ned Peppers Bar as responding police officers began shooting at him. Just as he reached the door, Betts fell to the ground and was shot to death by police.

In total, Betts fired 41 rounds into the crowd in less than 30 seconds, killing nine people and wounding 17 others. An additional 10 people were injured by other causes, bringing the total number of injured to 27. According to Dayton Police Chief Richard Biehl, law enforcement officers were already on the scene within 20 seconds of the first shots being fired and engaged the gunman, who was shot dead within 32 seconds. A total of 65 rounds were discharged by six police officers at the gunman. An autopsy report released on December 6 showed that Betts was directly hit with 30 rounds. He also suffered six other wounds from grazing and shrapnel injuries. According to the report, Betts was shot 7 times in the right arm, shot twice in the left arm, suffered a graze wound and a shrapnel wound to his left hand, suffered a graze wound to his right hand, shot once in the neck, shot twice in the chest, shot 3 times in the back, shot twice in the hip, shot 4 times in the right leg, shot 2 times and suffered a shrapnel wound in his left leg, suffered a graze wound in his left foot, shot 6 times and suffered a shrapnel wound in the buttocks, and shot at least once in the anus. The report suggested the gunshot wound to his anus was an overlapping wound from two separate rounds.

In the aftermath of the shooting, police evacuated many nearby night venues and warned Dayton residents to stay away from the Oregon Historic District.

== Victims ==
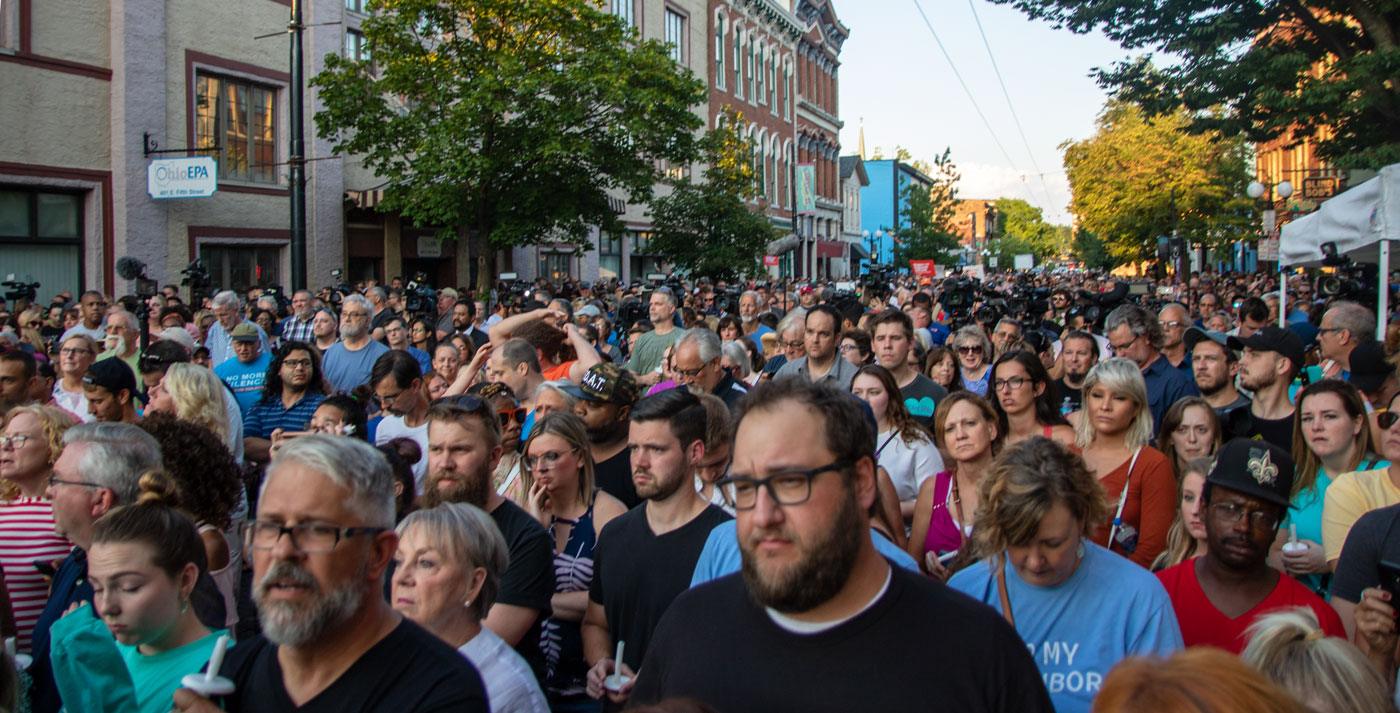
Vigil for the victims, August 5, 2019

Miami Valley Hospital received 16 victims from the shooting, of whom five were admitted, with one in critical condition. Kettering Health Network, comprising nine hospitals in the area, received nine victims, with three in serious condition and three in fair condition. By 10:00 a.m. on the same day, 15 of 27 hospitalized people had been discharged.

Police reported that all the fatalities occurred outside the bar on East 5th Street. The nine dead include six men and three women, six black and three white. The dead were Lois Osglesby, age 27; Nicholas Cumer, age 25; Thomas McNicholas, age 25; Logan Turner, age 30; Monica Brickhouse, age 39; Saeed Saleh, age 39; Derrick Fudge, age 57; Beatrice Warner-Curtis, age 36; and the perpetrator's brother, Jordan Cofer, age 22. Cofer, a transgender man who was not out to his family at the time of his death, but only to a limited number of friends, was often identified with his deadname and misgendered by the media. Two of the victims who died were also shot by police. An autopsy showed that a woman who was shot by Betts was already bleeding from a fatal gunshot wound when she was struck by two bullets that were fired by police. Had she not been suffering from fatal injuries, one of the bullets fired by police would not have been lethal. The second victim was shot by Betts multiple times and sustained a superficial gunshot wound from police. As a result of those findings, Montgomery County Coroner Dr. Kent Harshbarger ruled that the deaths were caused by Betts and were not the result of police gunfire.

== Perpetrator ==
Soon after the attack, police identified the gunman as Connor Stephen Betts (October 28, 1994 – August 4, 2019), a 24-year-old who lived in Bellbrook, Ohio. According to police, he had minor traffic offenses on his record.

Betts made online references about Satan and described himself as a leftist and antifa sympathizer. In the hours before he opened fire in Dayton, he "liked" a post in favor of gun control, and several concerning the El Paso shooting, including a tweet that called the El Paso shooter a "terrorist" and a "white supremacist". Betts was also known to have been in support of presidential candidates Bernie Sanders and Elizabeth Warren. An investigation concluded by the FBI in 2021 found that Betts "acted alone and was not directed by any organization or aligned to any specific ideological group," and that he "fantasized about mass shootings, serial killings, and murder-suicide for at least a decade".

Two former high school classmates said Betts was suspended from Bellbrook High School after he made lists of other students he wanted to kill and rape. The "hit list" was discovered in 2010 and resulted in a police investigation. He was previously bullied and had planned to shoot up the school, a classmate said. His high school girlfriend said he complained of visual and auditory hallucinations and psychosis, and was afraid of developing schizophrenia. The girlfriend also said there were warning signs about Betts, such as him showing her a video of a mass shooting on their first date, which she then attributed to him studying psychology at the time, Betts discussing putting a gun in his mouth, and Betts being fascinated with "current events" such as mass shootings. She also said that Betts had once called her at night and told her that he had a desire to hurt other people. She also said that Betts didn’t like his parents because of issues in his childhood that he would not share with her.

== Investigation ==
On August 4, police and the FBI searched the shooter's home and found evidence that showed an interest in violence and mass shootings and that he had expressed a desire to commit a mass shooting. A preliminary assessment did not indicate the shooter had a racial or political motive. As of August 5, 2019, police investigators stated that the investigation is ongoing and that they are not prepared to speculate about motivation. On August 5, Dayton Police Chief Richard Biehl stated that: "We have a lot of evidence still to go through ... based on where we're at now, we are not seeing any indication of race being a motive." Investigators are divided and have not determined whether he shot his sibling deliberately. A federal law enforcement official said that they were looking at whether the suspect was associated with incel groups.

The suspect had additional ammunition magazines with him, and was wearing body armor, a mask and hearing protection during the attack. He ordered the firearm used in the shooting online from Texas, and the firearm was transferred to a local firearms dealer in Ohio, where he picked it up. The firearm used was "modified in essence to function like a rifle", according to the Dayton Police; photos released by the Dayton Police show an AR-15 style firearm with a pistol brace.

On August 15, the Montgomery County Coroner announced that Betts had cocaine, alcohol, and Xanax in his system; and he also had a vape pen and a baggie containing cocaine in one of his pockets.

== Aftermath ==
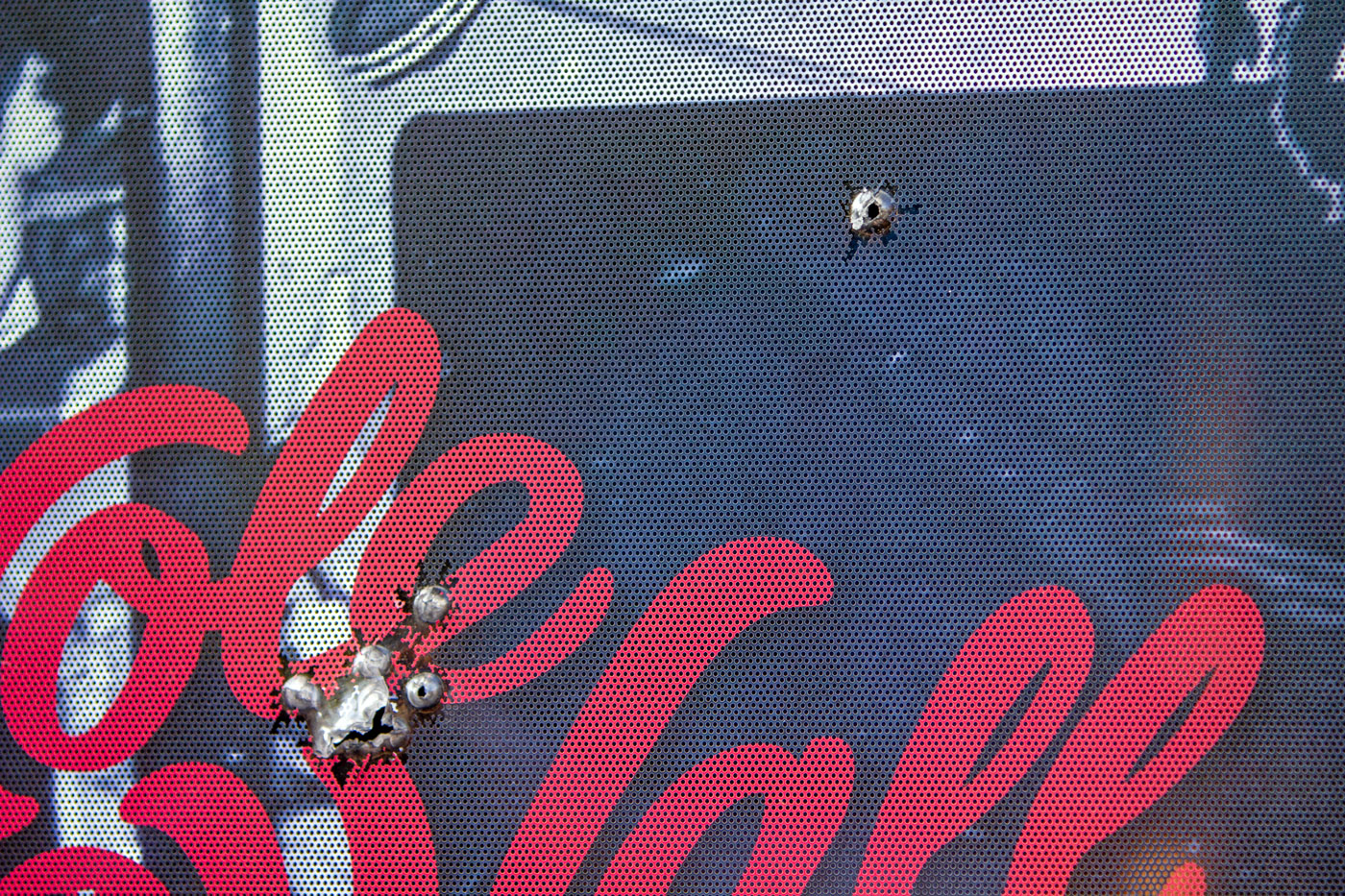
Bullet holes in a window a day after the shooting

Members of the Southwest Ohio Critical Incident Stress Management Team and the Greater Montgomery County CISM team met with police who had responded to the scene to help them process the situation. The team includes mental health professionals, police officers, firefighters, medics, and chaplains.

The local blood bank asked for more donations following the shooting, and various companies promoted donation drives. Local leaders and community members held a vigil on East 5th Street on August 4, where ten doves were released, one each for each dead victim and one for the injured.

Two years after the event, a wrongful death lawsuit was filed by a Columbus-based law firm Cooper Elliott and a national gun violence prevention organization Brady, against Kyung Chang Industry USA Inc., the original manufacturer of the weapon used during the shooting. In a public press release, attorney Ben Cooper has stated that these types of weapons find their use only in mass shootings and in the military, which questions the reasons of selling them to civilians.

== Reactions ==
=== Domestic ===
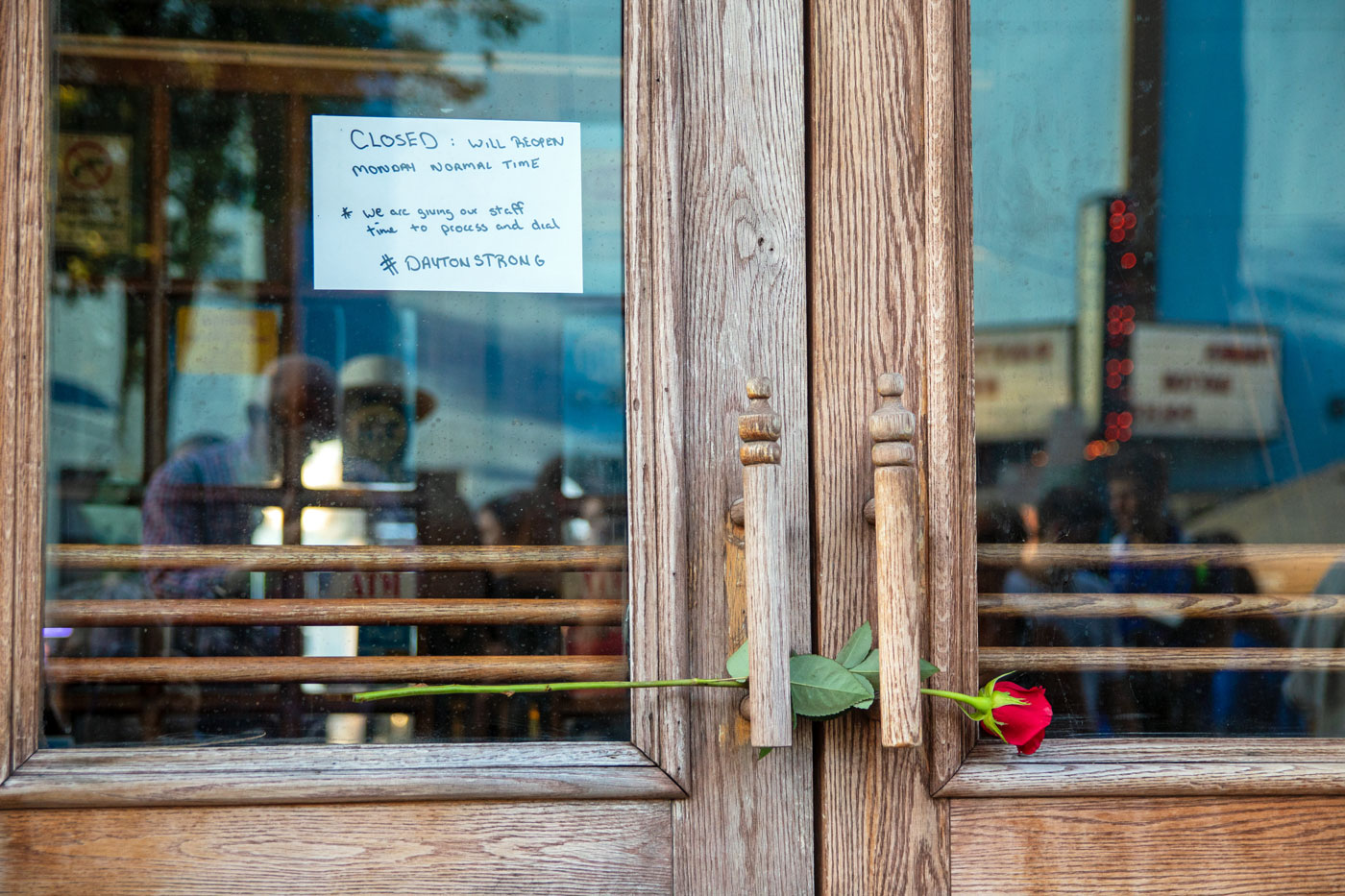
Note left at the entrance of Ned Peppers Bar the day after the shooting

Following the shooting, Ned Peppers Bar posted a message on Instagram reading: "All of our staff is safe and our hearts go out to everyone involved as we gather information."

President Trump addresses the El Paso and Dayton shootings a day after the Dayton shooting

President Donald Trump tweeted, "God bless the people of El Paso, Texas. God bless the people of Dayton, Ohio." In a later statement, he ordered that, following both shootings, all public U.S. flags be flown at half-staff until sunset on August 8. Regarding mass shootings, he said that the Trump Administration "have done much more than most administrations. We've actually done a lot. But perhaps more has to be done."

Mayor Nan Whaley thanked the officers for a quick response, saying that it certainly prevented more deaths. She also spoke of how hard the day would be for the city and the families affected. Ohio Senator Rob Portman and Governor Mike DeWine offered their condolences.

Senator Sherrod Brown, a Democrat representing Ohio, said "Thoughts and prayers are not enough. We must act." He urged Senate Majority Leader Mitch McConnell, a Republican, to start a United States Senate session on August 5 to "vote on gun-safety laws". Senate Minority Leader, Chuck Schumer, a Democrat, made a similar call to action. He referenced H.R.8, the Bipartisan Background Checks Act of 2019 that had passed the United States House of Representatives earlier in February, saying the Senate should also pass this. Representative Ted Lieu, a Democrat, asserted that McConnell was "blocking" the bipartisan proposal on "common sense gun safety legislation" from being voted on in the Senate.

Ohio House of Representatives member Candice Keller posted an essay on her personal Facebook page, blaming the shooting on several factors including recreational marijuana and the breakdown of the traditional family (due to causes including transgender rights). Her statement was criticized by Cincinnati City Council member Chris Seelbach, Butler County Sheriff Richard K. Jones, and Ohio Republican Party chairwoman Jane Timken (who called on her to resign).

Following the El Paso shooting, which occurred 13 hours prior, multiple Democratic 2020 presidential election candidates called for political action to eliminate gun violence in the United States; they included Cory Booker, Pete Buttigieg, Tim Ryan, Bernie Sanders, Elizabeth Warren, and Andrew Yang.

President Trump visited El Paso and Dayton on August 7. In Dayton, he spoke to hospitalized victims, medical staff, and first responders. The White House published photos and videos of his trip, some of which showed him posing, smiling, and giving thumbs up gestures with his hosts. He told reporters, "We had an amazing day. The love, the respect for the office of the presidency – I wish you could have been in there to see it." During this, President Trump also tried to deflect the blame from his rhetoric that critics blame him for causing the El Paso Shooting by saying: “In Dayton, it just came out ... he was a fan of Bernie Sanders and Elizabeth Warren — nothing to do with Trump, but nobody ever mentions that,” When a reporter asked Trump if he blamed Warren or Sanders for Betts’s attack, Trump responded: “No I don’t blame Elizabeth Warren, I don’t blame Bernie Sanders, in the case of Ohio — I don’t blame anybody. These are sick people. These are really people who are mentally ill — who are disturbed.”

Comedian Dave Chappelle hosted a free concert for Dayton three weeks after the shootings to honor the victims and their families. More than 20,000 were estimated at the event, which included performances from artists such as Stevie Wonder, Jon Stewart, and Chance the Rapper.

=== International ===
The incident was mentioned by Pope Francis during a speech in St. Peter's Square on August 4, in which he condemned attacks on defenseless people and said he was spiritually close to the victims and the families affected by the attacks that had "bloodied Texas, California, and Ohio".

In response to the shooting, the Consulate General of Japan in Detroit issued a notice stating that no Asians had been injured and that "Japanese residents should be aware of the potential for gunfire incidents everywhere in the United States, a gun society, and continue to pay close attention to safety measures." At least two other nations – Uruguay and Venezuela — issued similar travel warnings, with Uruguay's foreign ministry issuing a statement warning its citizens traveling in the U.S. "to take precautions against growing indiscriminate violence, mostly for hate crimes, including racism and discrimination", and Venezuela cautioning its citizens to postpone travel to the U.S. or to take precautions "given the proliferation of acts of violence and crimes of indiscriminate hatred".

=== Musical ===
Pornogrind saw some limited mainstream media attention after the 2019 Dayton shooting when it came to light that the perpetrator, Connor Betts, performed live vocals in the pornogrind group Menstrual Munchies on multiple occasions. After the attack, artists, performers and avid fans of the genre were outraged after outlets such as Vice attempted linking pornogrind's obscene themes to the gunman's motives. While pornogrind artists made it very clear that they do not approve of real life violence or Betts' actions, there were nevertheless a handful of pornogrind musicians who deleted their social media profiles, put their bands on a hiatus or outright quit the genre after the attack occurred.

== See also ==
- List of mass shootings in the United States
- Mass shootings in the United States
- Gun violence in the United States
