= 2020 Oval Office address =

President Trump's March 11 speech on the coronavirus pandemic

On the Coronavirus Pandemic
- Footage of President Trump's speech
- Date: March 11, 2020; 6 years ago
- Duration: ~10 minutes
- Venue: Oval Office, White House
- Location: Washington, D.C., United States; 38°53′52″N 77°02′11″W
- Theme: Coronavirus Pandemic

The 2020 Oval Office address, officially titled On the Coronavirus Pandemic, was the second televised, prime-time Oval Office address during the presidency of Donald Trump, delivered on March 11, 2020 at 9:01PM EDT. It was released during the rapidly spreading COVID-19 pandemic and the 2020 stock market crash. The pandemic went on to be the most devastating since the Spanish Flu, a century earlier.

== Background ==
=== COVID-19 pandemic ===
The COVID-19 pandemic was global pandemic of COVID-19, a disease caused by SARS-CoV-2. The virus was first reported in Wuhan, Hubei, China, in December 2019.

=== March 11, 2020 ===
A confluence of events made March 11 a significant day in the progression of COVID-19 in the United States:

- Dr. Anthony Fauci of the National Institutes of Health, testifying before congress, said the COVID-19 pandemic in the United States would get significantly worse, saying "the number could go way up and be involved in many, many millions."
- The World Health Organization announced COVID-19 was officially a pandemic.
- The Dow Jones stock market, which had dropped more than 2000 points on Monday, March 9, dropped another 1400 points on Wednesday.
- The actor Tom Hanks announced he and his wife, the actress Rita Wilson, had both contracted COVID-19 and were quarantined in Australia.
- The National Basketball Association game in Oklahoma City between the Oklahoma City Thunder and the Utah Jazz was canceled just before tip-off because of a positive COVID-19 test for Utah player Rudy Gobert. An hour later, the NBA announced it was suspending its entire schedule indefinitely.

=== Response from the Presidency of the United States ===
United States President Donald Trump initially reacted mildly to the COVID-19 pandemic, aiming to minimize public panic. Vice President Mike Pence, who chaired the White House Coronavirus Task Force, urged Trump to deliver a more serious public statement about the pandemic. Eventually a speech was drafted for Trump with the assistance of Stephen Miller, his chief speechwriter, and Jared Kushner, his son-in-law. To make time for the delivery of the address, Trump cancelled a scheduled private dinner at Pence's residence and Pence cancelled a press conference with the White House Coronavirus Task Force.

== Contents ==
In the address, which lasted about 10 minutes, President Trump announced several initiatives directly related to combating the Covid crises:

- "(A)ll travel from Europe," excepting the United Kingdom, would be suspended for 30 days. Travel from Europe by U.S. Citizens would be allowed after "appropriate screenings."
- The travel ban would include the "tremendous amount of trade and cargo" coming from Europe.
- The Health Insurance Industry would waive all co-payments for Coronavirus treatments, and insurance coverage would be extended to include treatments for COVID-19

Trump also announced several financial initiatives tied to the pandemic:

- Tax payments to certain affected individuals and businesses would be deferred.
- The Small Business Administration (SBA) would provide low-interest loans to businesses in "affected states and territories."
- The President asked Congress to increase funding to the SBA for these loans by $50 billion.
- He also asked Congress to consider "immediate payroll tax relief."

== Initial confusion and technical difficulties ==
Multiple errors, both within the speech and with Trump's delivery, led to temporary widespread confusion:

- The travel ban did not extend to all countries in Europe (excepting the U.K.), but only to the 26 countries in the Schengen Area.
- The ban did not include trade and cargo.
- The health insurance industry was only waiving copayments for COVID-19 testing, not for treatments.
- Many Americans in Europe, thinking that they would be abruptly cut off from travelling to the United States, purchased airline tickets for significant sums of money.
- Trump later released a statement on Twitter saying, "...Very important for all countries and businesses to know that trade will in no way be affected by the 30-day restriction on travel from Europe. The restriction stops people not goods."

== Reception ==
Reception to the speech was generally negative. The American Conservative writer Daniel Larison described the speech as going over "like a lead balloon." Trump received substantial criticism over his choice of wording in the speech, which seemed to imply a total ban on trade with Europe was being implemented, as well as making the speech without first consulting with European Union leaders. Trump's speech did not have a positive effect on the stock market, with the Dow Jones Industrial Average futures trading 600 points lower as he was concluding his speech, though this was partly influenced by other factors. Trump also drew criticism for perceived racist and nativist themes present within his speech.

Several commentators and analysts, albeit almost exclusively those strongly affiliated with the right-wing, viewed the speech in a more positive manner. Generally, those with more positive viewpoints of Trump's speech focused on the themes of victory included within it.

== See also ==
- 2019 Oval Office address
- COVID-19 pandemic in the United States
- Black Thursday (2020)
- Timeline of Donald Trump's first presidency (2020 Q1)
