= Timeline of the first Trump presidency (2019 Q1) =

The following is a timeline of the first presidency of Donald Trump during the first quarter of 2019, from January 1 to March 31, 2019. For a complete itinerary of his travels, see List of presidential trips made by Donald Trump (2019). To navigate between quarters, see timeline of the Donald Trump presidencies. For the Q2 timeline see timeline of the first Trump presidency (2019 Q2).

== Overview ==
The first quarter of 2019 began with the continuing government shutdown which had begun on December 22; it lasted until January 25.

== Timeline ==
=== January 2019 ===
Date	Events	Photos/videos
Tuesday, January 1	James Mattis resigns as 26th United States Secretary of Defense. Deputy Secretary Patrick M. Shanahan becomes Acting Secretary of Defense. Mattis' resignation had been announced December 2018, for the end of February 2019, before being pushed forward by President Trump.; Deputy Ambassador to the United Nations Jonathan Cohen assumes acting duties, following the resignation of Ambassador Nikki Haley the previous day.; Day 11 of the partial government shutdown	Secretary of Defense Mattis served from 2017 to 2019.
Wednesday, January 2	John F. Kelly resigns as 28th White House Chief of Staff. OMB Director Mick Mulvaney concurrently becomes Acting Chief of Staff. Kelly's resignation was announced in December 2018.; Ryan Zinke resigns as the 52nd United States Secretary of the Interior. Deputy Secretary David Bernhardt becomes Acting Secretary of the Interior. Zinke's resignation was announced on December 15, 2018.; The final session of the Republican-controlled House of Representatives took place.; Day 12 of the partial government shutdown	President Trump meets with Congressional leadership
Thursday, January 3	The 116th United States Congress convenes with the Democratic Party is controlling the House of Representatives while the Republican Party is retaining their majority in the Senate.; Nancy Pelosi is elected as Speaker of the United States House of Representatives for a second tenure.; Day 13 of the partial government shutdown	
Friday, January 4	President Trump considers declaring a national emergency on the southern border in order to bypass Congress on the issue of a border wall.; Day 14 of the partial government shutdown	President Trump delivers remarks on considering to declare the national emergency
Saturday, January 5	Day 15 of the partial government shutdown	
Sunday, January 6	Day 16 of the partial government shutdown	
Monday, January 7	President Trump announces a prime time televised address on border security for the following day.; Day 17 of the partial government shutdown	
Tuesday, January 8	President Trump addresses the nation on prime-time television concerning the ongoing federal government shutdown.; Day 18 of the partial government shutdown	President Trump addresses the nation on the federal government shutdown
Wednesday, January 9	President Trump abruptly walks out of a meeting with Democratic leaders.; Day 19 of the partial government shutdown	
Thursday, January 10	President Trump visits McAllen, Texas, along the southern border and meets with Border Patrol personnel.; Secretary of the Treasury Steven Mnuchin gives Congress a classified briefing about his decision to lift sanctions on companies linked to Russian oligarch Oleg Deripaska.; Day 20 of the partial government shutdown	President Trump with U.S. Customs and Border Protection officers
Friday, January 11	Day 21 of the partial government shutdown	
Saturday, January 12	The partial government shutdown enters its 22nd day, becoming the longest government shutdown in U.S. history after passing the United States federal government shutdowns of 1995–1996.	
Sunday, January 13	Day 23 of the partial government shutdown	
Monday, January 14	President Trump entertains the Clemson Tigers, 2018 College Football Playoff National Champions, at the White House with a menu of various fast foods.; President Trump travels to New Orleans to address the American Farm Bureau.; Day 24 of the partial government shutdown	President Trump with a variety of meals from Domino's, McDonald's, Wendy's and Burger King
Tuesday, January 15	William P. Barr undergoes his confirmation hearing for the position of Attorney General.; Trump Administration calls on some FAA and IRS furloughed employees to return to work to provide air safety and to implement the upcoming tax filing season.; Day 25 of the partial government shutdown	
Wednesday, January 16	Day 2 of William Barr's confirmation hearing; Speaker Pelosi sends a letter to President Trump that suggests he either reschedule his 2019 State of the Union Address or submit a written State of the Union to Congress instead of a televised oral speech, citing fears of security concerns regarding unpaid Secret Service members as a consequence of the government shutdown.; President Trump meets in the White House with rank and file House Democrats to discuss the shutdown.; Day 26 of the partial government shutdown	
Thursday, January 17	President Trump sends a letter to Speaker Pelosi, postponing her planned trips to Brussels, Egypt and Afghanistan, a move which is seen by both Democrats and Republicans as an indirect response to her letter requesting that the State of the Union Address be rescheduled.; A report by BuzzFeed News journalists Jason Leopold and Anthony Cormier is released, alleging that President Trump directed his former attorney Michael Cohen to lie to Congress about their Moscow Tower Project. The report further alleges that Cohen did not reveal this to the Mueller investigation himself, but rather confirmed it when prompted with evidence such as text and e-mail exchanges between implicated parties.; President Trump, alongside Vice President Mike Pence and Acting Secretary of Defense Patrick M. Shanahan, visits The Pentagon to address the Missile Defense Review of 2019. In his speech, Trump calls for missile defense in space via a Space Force as well as reiterating North Korea's status as an "extraordinary threat".; Day 27 of the partial government shutdown	
Friday, January 18	President Trump and Secretary of State Mike Pompeo meet with North Korea's lead negotiator Kim Yong-chol in Washington, D.C., to discuss denuclearization and preparations for a second meeting with Kim Jong-un.; The special counsel's office issues a rare statement in response to the report by BuzzFeed News regarding Michael Cohen's Congressional testimony by clarifying that it is inaccurate in its assessment.; Day 28 of the partial government shutdown	North Korean General Kim Yong-chol delivers a personal letter from Kim Jong-un to President Trump
Saturday, January 19	President Trump again delivers remarks regarding the border and the ongoing shutdown, inviting Democrats to come to the negotiating table after listing topics of compromise such as DACA and temporary protected status in exchange for a border wall while bringing an end to the government shutdown. However, Democrats seem reluctant to accept this proposition.; Day 29 of the partial government shutdown	President Trump delivers remarks on a proposal to end the government shutdown
Sunday, January 20	President Trump completes his second year in office.; Day 30 of the partial government shutdown	
Monday, January 21	President Trump and Vice President Pence make a visit to the Martin Luther King Jr. Memorial to pay tribute to the late Martin Luther King Jr. on Martin Luther King Jr. Day.; The Supreme Court rules that the Trump administration is allowed to limit military service by transgender people. The court's five conservative justices, Chief Justice John Roberts and Justices Samuel Alito, Neil Gorsuch, Brett Kavanaugh and Clarence Thomas, support the exclusion of transgender men and women.; Day 31 of the partial government shutdown	President Trump and Vice President Pence visit the Martin Luther King Jr. Memorial
Tuesday, January 22	Day 32 of the partial government shutdown	
Wednesday, January 23	President Trump sends a letter to Speaker Pelosi stating that he intends to move forward with the planned date of January 29 for his State of the Union Address. Pelosi blocks his attempt at an address until the government is reopened, making Trump the first President in U.S. history to be uninvited to a State of the Union Address. President Trump responds to this by announcing, via Twitter, that he will not seek an alternative route for his 2019 State of the Union Address and will instead comply with Speaker Pelosi's condition of having the government reopened before going any further.; Michael Cohen requests rescheduling his testimony before Congress, citing increased threats against him and his family by President Trump and his attorney, Rudy Giuliani. This request is denied by both the House Oversight Committee and House Intel Committee.; President Trump and Vice President Pence officially recognize Juan Guaidó as the interim President of Venezuela as unrest in the country continues to unfold due to Nicolás Maduro's refusal to concede.; Day 33 of the partial government shutdown	
Thursday, January 24	Both Democratic and Republican bills to end the government shutdown fail in the Senate.; Day 34 of the partial government shutdown	
Friday, January 25	Roger Stone, a former adviser to President Trump, is indicted by the Mueller investigation and then arrested by the FBI at his Florida home on charges of obstruction, witness tampering and making false statements. He is later released on a $250,000 bond and stripped of his passport.; The FAA delays flights at the LaGuardia Airport in New York City, and multiple other major airports, due to safety concerns from staffing shortages as a consequence of the ongoing shutdown.; President Trump, from the Rose Garden, says he and Congressional leaders Mitch McConnell and Chuck Schumer have agreed upon a three-week stop-gap spending deal, which does not contain funding for a wall on the southern border, in order to temporarily end the government shutdown. In addition, he states that, if no deal for a border wall is reached within those three weeks, he will announce a national emergency on the southern border.; Speaker Pelosi says President Trump's State of the Union Address will be rescheduled from January 29 to a later date.; The partial government shutdown ends on its 35th day.	President Trump delivers remarks on an agreement to end the government shutdown
Saturday, January 26		
Sunday, January 27		
Monday, January 28	The United States Secretary of Homeland Security Kirstjen Nielsen, Acting Attorney General Matthew Whitaker, Commerce Secretary Wilbur Ross, and FBI Director Christopher Wray announce 23 criminal charges (including financial fraud, money laundering, conspiracy to defraud the United States, theft of trade secret technology, provided bonus to workers who stole confidential information from companies around the world, wire fraud, obstruction of justice and sanctions violations) against Chinese tech giant Huawei and its CFO Meng Wanzhou.	U.S. Department of Justice, Department of Homeland Security, Department of Commerce and Federal Bureau of Investigation announce criminal charges against Huawei and Meng Wanzhou
Tuesday, January 29		
Wednesday, January 30		
Thursday, January 31		

=== February 2019 ===
Date	Events	Photos/videos
Friday, February 1	President Trump announces he is withdrawing the United States from the Intermediate-Range Nuclear Forces Treaty, accusing Russia of non-compliance.	
Saturday, February 2		
Sunday, February 3		
Monday, February 4		
Tuesday, February 5	President Trump delivers his second official State of the Union Address.; A fundraising effort by Trump's 2020 campaign in the days leading to the address and on the day of the address raised $2.4 million from 76,000 donors. His campaign displayed names of donors on a live streaming broadcast of the event on Donald Trump's Facebook page.	President Trump delivers his second official State of the Union Address
Wednesday, February 6		
Thursday, February 7	President Trump speaks at the National Prayer Breakfast.	
Friday, February 8		
Saturday, February 9		
Sunday, February 10		
Monday, February 11	President Trump holds a rally in El Paso, Texas.	
Tuesday, February 12		
Wednesday, February 13	President Trump holds a bilateral meeting with Colombian President Iván Duque Márquez at the White House.	President Trump and Colombian President Iván Duque Márquez
Thursday, February 14	The Senate confirms William Barr as the 85th U.S. Attorney General in a vote of 54–45.	President Trump participates in the swearing-in of Attorney General William Barr
Friday, February 15	President Trump declares a national emergency in order to secure sufficient funds to construct a physical barrier along the Southern border.	President Trump delivers remarks on declaring the national emergency
Saturday, February 16		
Sunday, February 17		
Monday, February 18	President Trump holds a rally in Miami, Florida where he addresses the ongoing leadership crisis in Venezuela and shows his support for Venezuelan Opposition Leader Juan Guaidó.	President Trump speaks to Venezuelan-American supporters in Miami, Florida
Tuesday, February 19		
Wednesday, February 20	President Trump holds a bilateral meeting with Austrian Chancellor Sebastian Kurz at the White House.	
Thursday, February 21		
Friday, February 22		
Saturday, February 23		
Sunday, February 24	President Trump attends the National Governors Association dinner.	
Monday, February 25		
Tuesday, February 26		
Wednesday, February 27	President Trump holds a bilateral meeting with Vietnamese President Nguyễn Phú Trọng and Vietnamese Prime Minister Nguyễn Xuân Phúc.; President Trump and North Korean leader Kim Jong Un participate in a summit at the Metropole Hotel in Hanoi, Vietnam.	President Trump and North Korean leader Kim Jong Un meeting in Hanoi, Vietnam
Thursday, February 28	President Trump and North Korean leader Kim Jong Un participate in a summit at the Metropole Hotel in Hanoi, Vietnam. However, the talks end early without any nuclear weapons deals or peace accords produced.	President Trump during the press conference after the summit

=== March 2019 ===
Date	Events	Photos/videos
Friday, March 1		
Saturday, March 2	President Trump delivers a speech in Oxon Hill, Maryland to the 2019 Conservative Political Action Conference.	President Trump at the 2019 CPAC
Sunday, March 3		
Monday, March 4	President Trump entertains the North Dakota State Bison, 2018 College Football Playoff National Champions, at the White House with a menu of various fast foods.	President Trump with a variety of meals from McDonald's and Chick-fil-A
Tuesday, March 5		
Wednesday, March 6		
Thursday, March 7	President Trump holds a bilateral meeting with Czech Prime Minister Andrej Babiš at the White House.	President Trump and Czech Prime Minister Andrej Babiš
Friday, March 8		
Saturday, March 9		
Sunday, March 10		
Monday, March 11		
Tuesday, March 12		
Wednesday, March 13		
Thursday, March 14	President Trump holds a bilateral meeting with Taoiseach Leo Varadkar of Ireland at the White House.	President Trump and Taoiseach Leo Varadkar (Prime Minister of Ireland)
Friday, March 15		
Saturday, March 16		
Sunday, March 17		
Monday, March 18		
Tuesday, March 19	President Trump holds a bilateral meeting and joint press conference with Brazilian President Jair Bolsonaro at the White House.	A Joint Press Conference with President Trump and Brazilian President Jair Bolsonaro
Wednesday, March 20	President Trump visits Lima Army Tank Plant.	President Trump speaks to the workers at the Army Tank Plant in Lima, Ohio
Thursday, March 21		
Friday, March 22	Special Counsel Robert Mueller finishes his investigation into Russian interference in the 2016 presidential election and the alleged relationship between Donald Trump and Russia and submits his report to Attorney General William Barr.; President Trump meets with the leaders of five Caribbean countries in Mar-a-Lago, Florida: Dominican President Danilo Medina, Haitian President Jovenel Moïse, Jamaican Prime Minister Andrew Holness, Saint Lucian Prime Minister Allen Chastanet and Bahamian Prime Minister Hubert Minnis.	President Trump and First Lady Melania Trump with the leaders of five Caribbean countries
Saturday, March 23		
Sunday, March 24	A four-page summary of the Mueller Report was released to Congress and found that President Trump did not collude with the Russians to win the 2016 presidential election and, in the opinion of AG Barr, the issue of whether obstruction of justice was committed was found to be inconclusive.	
Monday, March 25	President Trump holds a bilateral meeting and joint press conference with Israeli Prime Minister Benjamin Netanyahu at the White House.; President Trump signs a presidential proclamation to officially recognize Israel's sovereignty over the Golan Heights.	Joint Press Conference with President Trump and Israeli Prime Minister Benjamin Netanyahu
Tuesday, March 26	Congress fails to obtain the 2/3 vote needed to overturn President Trump veto in regard to the national emergency which was declared on February 15.	
Wednesday, March 27	President Trump meets with Fabiana Rosales, wife of Venezuelan Opposition Leader Juan Guaidó, at the White House.; President Trump participates in an interview with author Kate Andersen Brower, who was working on the book, "Team of Five: The President's Club in the Age of Trump"	President Trump and Fabiana Rosales
Thursday, March 28	President Trump holds a rally in Grand Rapids, Michigan.	
Friday, March 29		
Saturday, March 30		
Sunday, March 31		

== See also ==
- First 100 days of the first Trump presidency – Period from January to April 2017
- List of executive actions by Donald Trump
- Lists of presidential trips made by Donald Trump (international trips)
- First presidential transition of Donald Trump – Transfer of presidential power from Barack Obama to Donald Trump
- Timeline of the 2016 United States presidential election

U.S. presidential administration timelines
Preceded by First Trump presidency (2018 Q4)	First Trump presidency (2019 Q1)	Succeeded by First Trump presidency (2019 Q2)
