= 2019 Oval Office address =

Speech by President Donald Trump on United States policies

On the Government Shutdown and the Proposed United States-Mexico Border wall
- Footage of President Trump's speech
- Date: January 8, 2019; 7 years ago
- Duration: ~10 minutes
- Venue: Oval Office, White House
- Location: Washington, D.C., United States; 38°53′52″N 77°02′11″W
- Theme: Government Shutdown and the Proposed United States-Mexico Border wall

The 2019 Oval Office address, officially titled On the Government Shutdown and the Proposed United States-Mexico Border wall, was the first televised, prime-time Oval Office address during the presidency of Donald Trump, delivered on January 8, 2019 at 9:01PM EDT. It was released during the 17th day of a partial shutdown of the United States federal government. President Donald Trump delivered an address on illegal immigration from the Oval Office of the White House in Washington, D.C. Major television networks broadcast the president's prime time speech as well as the Democratic response.

Trump used the speech to push for Congress to fund the construction of a larger barrier or wall at the border with Mexico, in order to fulfill a key promise of his campaign. Trump's refusal to sign a continuing resolution to keep the federal government open in the absence of funding for the wall had led to the shutdown. The address lasted just under ten minutes and was Trump's first to be televised from the Oval Office.

== Content ==
During the speech, Trump blamed the shutdown on Congressional Democrats, despite saying in a televised meeting held with Democratic leaders Nancy Pelosi and Chuck Schumer on December 11 that he would be "proud to shut down the government for border security" and that he would not blame the Democrats.

Trump reiterated his demand for $5.7 billion for the border wall, which he said would be made of "steel slats" instead of concrete, as previously assumed. He cited statistics he claimed were caused by illegal immigration to the United States, such as the opioid epidemic: “Every week, 300 of our citizens are killed by heroin alone, 90 percent of which floods across our southern border”, and high crime rates among illegal immigrants: “In the last two years, ICE officers made 266,000 arrests of aliens with criminal records,” Trump also said that "Senator Chuck Schumer, who you will be hearing from later tonight, has repeatedly supported a physical barrier in the past, along with other Democrats." and: "America proudly welcomes millions of lawful immigrants who enrich our society and contribute to our nation, but all Americans are hurt by uncontrolled illegal migration. It strains public resources and drives down jobs and wages." Trump further said, "The border wall would very quickly pay for itself." All of these claims are accurate, according to The New York Times fact checkers, but reportedly needed context. They also said his claims, “The federal government remains shut down for one reason and one reason only: because Democrats will not fund border security,” and that, “The wall will also be paid for, indirectly by the great new trade deal we have made with Mexico,” are "false" because Democrats did not support the wall, but border security in general, and that Mexico paying indirectly was "different" from Trump's false campaign promise that Mexico would pay for the wall. They also wrote that his claim that, “Every day, Customs and Border Patrol agents encounter thousands of illegal immigrants trying to enter our country,” was "misleading".

== Democratic response ==
Leaders of the Democratic Party requested equal airtime. House Speaker Nancy Pelosi and Senate Minority Leader Chuck Schumer delivered a response to Trump's speech, blaming Trump for the shutdown, saying "his obsession with forcing American taxpayers to waste billions of dollars on an expensive and ineffective wall — a wall he always falsely promised Mexico would pay for." The New York Times has determined Schumer's statement that "[no] president should pound the table and demand he gets his way or else the government shuts down, hurting millions of Americans who are treated as leverage." needed context but was true, indirectly through Americans' family members.

== Network coverage ==
Trump's administration requested airtime from the networks one day in advance. Trump then announced via Twitter: "I am pleased to inform you that I will Address the Nation on the Humanitarian and National Security crisis on our Southern Border. Tuesday night at 9:00 P.M. Eastern".

The speech was carried live by the major over-the-air and cable news networks in the U.S., eliciting criticism that the media was giving the president a free platform to possibly make "inflammatory or misleading statements". Critics compared the favorable treatment of Trump by the media to the refusal of networks to air a November 2014 speech on immigration by President Barack Obama for being "too political".

Prior to the speech, Joe Lockhart, Daniel Pfeiffer, Jay Rosen, and Connie Schultz, among others, advocated for media to fact check Trump's comments. Mika Brzezinski said networks "should refuse to turn over the airwaves to Donald Trump tonight for what they know objectively to be a steady stream of lies". Ted Koppel said Trump should be given the "benefit of the doubt".

The address and Democratic response drew an estimated total of 43.3 million viewers not including livestreams according to a Nielsen report. The address brought in a 28.1 rating and the response brought in a 29.3 rating in metered markets on ABC, CBS, NBC, Fox, Fox News, CNN and MSNBC.

== Transcript ==
President Donald Trump:

"My fellow Americans: Tonight, I am speaking to you because there is a growing humanitarian and security crisis at our southern border.

Every day, Customs and Border Patrol agents encounter thousands of illegal immigrants trying to enter our country. We are out of space to hold them, and we have no way to promptly return them back home to their country.

America proudly welcomes millions of lawful immigrants who enrich our society and contribute to our nation. But all Americans are hurt by uncontrolled, illegal migration. It strains public resources and drives down jobs and wages. Among those hardest hit are African Americans and Hispanic Americans.

Our southern border is a pipeline for vast quantities of illegal drugs, including meth, heroin, cocaine, and fentanyl. Every week, 300 of our citizens are killed by heroin alone, 90 percent of which floods across from our southern border. More Americans will die from drugs this year than were killed in the entire Vietnam War.

In the last two years, ICE officers made 266,000 arrests of aliens with criminal records, including those charged or convicted of 100,000 assaults, 30,000 sex crimes, and 4,000 violent killings. Over the years, thousands of Americans have been brutally killed by those who illegally entered our country, and thousands more lives will be lost if we don’t act right now.

This is a humanitarian crisis — a crisis of the heart and a crisis of the soul.

Last month, 20,000 migrant children were illegally brought into the United States — a dramatic increase. These children are used as human pawns by vicious coyotes and ruthless gangs. One in three women are sexually assaulted on the dangerous trek up through Mexico. Women and children are the biggest victims, by far, of our broken system.

This is the tragic reality of illegal immigration on our southern border. This is the cycle of human suffering that I am determined to end.

My administration has presented Congress with a detailed proposal to secure the border and stop the criminal gangs, drug smugglers, and human traffickers. It’s a tremendous problem. Our proposal was developed by law enforcement professionals and border agents at the Department of Homeland Security. These are the resources they have requested to properly perform their mission and keep America safe. In fact, safer than ever before.

The proposal from Homeland Security includes cutting-edge technology for detecting drugs, weapons, illegal contraband, and many other things. We have requested more agents, immigration judges, and bed space to process the sharp rise in unlawful migration fueled by our very strong economy. Our plan also contains an urgent request for humanitarian assistance and medical support.

Furthermore, we have asked Congress to close border security loopholes so that illegal immigrant children can be safely and humanely returned back home.

Finally, as part of an overall approach to border security, law enforcement professionals have requested $5.7 billion for a physical barrier. At the request of Democrats, it will be a steel barrier rather than a concrete wall. This barrier is absolutely critical to border security. It’s also what our professionals at the border want and need. This is just common sense.

The border wall would very quickly pay for itself. The cost of illegal drugs exceeds $500 billion a year — vastly more than the $5.7 billion we have requested from Congress. The wall will also be paid for, indirectly, by the great new trade deal we have made with Mexico.

Senator Chuck Schumer — whom you will be hearing from later tonight — has repeatedly supported a physical barrier in the past, along with many other Democrats. They changed their mind only after I was elected president.

Democrats in Congress have refused to acknowledge the crisis. And they have refused to provide our brave border agents with the tools they desperately need to protect our families and our nation.

The federal government remains shut down for one reason and one reason only: because Democrats will not fund border security.

My administration is doing everything in our power to help those impacted by the situation. But the only solution is for Democrats to pass a spending bill that defends our borders and re-opens the government.

This situation could be solved in a 45-minute meeting. I have invited Congressional leadership to the White House tomorrow to get this done. Hopefully, we can rise above partisan politics in order to support national security.

Some have suggested a barrier is immoral. Then why do wealthy politicians build walls, fences, and gates around their homes? They don’t build walls because they hate the people on the outside, but because they love the people on the inside. The only thing that is immoral is the politicians to do nothing and continue to allow more innocent people to be so horribly victimized.

America’s heart broke the day after Christmas when a young police officer in California was savagely murdered in cold blood by an illegal alien, who just came across the border. The life of an American hero was stolen by someone who had no right to be in our country.

Day after day, precious lives are cut short by those who have violated our borders. In California, an Air Force veteran was raped, murdered, and beaten to death with a hammer by an illegal alien with a long criminal history. In Georgia, an illegal alien was recently charged with murder for killing, beheading, and dismembering his neighbor. In Maryland, MS-13 gang members who arrived in the United States as unaccompanied minors were arrested and charged last year after viciously stabbing and beating a 16-year-old girl.

Over the last several years, I’ve met with dozens of families whose loved ones were stolen by illegal immigration. I’ve held the hands of the weeping mothers and embraced the grief-stricken fathers. So sad. So terrible. I will never forget the pain in their eyes, the tremble in their voices, and the sadness gripping their souls.

How much more American blood must we shed before Congress does its job?

To those who refuse to compromise in the name of border security, I would ask: Imagine if it was your child, your husband, or your wife whose life was so cruelly shattered and totally broken?

To every member of Congress: Pass a bill that ends this crisis.

To every citizen: Call Congress and tell them to finally, after all of these decades, secure our border.

This is a choice between right and wrong, justice and injustice. This is about whether we fulfill our sacred duty to the American citizens we serve.

When I took the Oath of Office, I swore to protect our country. And that is what I will always do, so help me God.

Thank you and goodnight."

== Fundraising ==
A Trump Pence campaign fundraising email titled “Official Secure the Border Fund” was distributed prior to the speech and asked supporters to donate.

“We need to raise $500,000 in ONE DAY. I want to know who stood with me when it mattered most so I’ve asked my team to send me a list of EVERY AMERICAN PATRIOT who donates to the Official Secure the Border Fund,” stated the Trump-signed memo. “Please make a special contribution of $5 by 9 PM EST to our Official Secure the Border Fund to have your name sent to me after my speech.”

A second fundraising plea to Trump supporters followed the speech and gave supporters additional time to get on the list.

== See also ==
- 2020 Oval Office address
- Immigration policy of the first Donald Trump administration
- 2019 United States federal budget
- Timeline of Donald Trump's first presidency (2019 Q1)
