= John H. Balsley =

Inventor

John H. Balsley (May 29, 1823 – March 12, 1895) was a master carpenter and inventor, inventing a practical folding wooden stepladder and receiving the first U.S. patent issued for a safety stepladder in the year.

He was born in Connellsville, Fayette County, Pennsylvania to George H. and Sarah (Shallenberger) Balsley. His father was also a carpenter.

An odd coincidence is that in the borough of Connellsville in 1825, a new borough office was created: Keeper of Ladders. The title of Ladder Keeper does not appear after 1831 (although there is a gap in records from 1835 to 1856). William Balsley, an uncle, was on the town council at the time the office was created. Although none of his family seems to have held this new office, one can only speculate whether it somehow stimulated an interest in ladders on the part of young John. John H. Balsley migrated to Dayton, Ohio before 1850.

Although stepladders had been in use for many years before 1862, his primary contribution to safety was the replacement of round rungs by flat steps. He became a wealthy businessman because of his inventions. Balsley's home in the Oregon Historic District, built about 1877, still stands at 419 East Sixth Street, a reminder of his success. He was also a Trustee of the City of Dayton Water Works for a year from April 1870, his only known public service.

John H. Balsley and Sophia C. Balsley (January 1827–27 September 1905), his wife, are interred in Woodland Cemetery, Dayton, Ohio.
