= Timeline of the first Trump presidency (2019 Q2) =

The following is a timeline of the first presidency of Donald Trump during the second quarter of 2019, from April 1 to June 30, 2019. For a complete itinerary of his travels, see List of presidential trips made by Donald Trump (2019). To navigate between quarters, see timeline of the Donald Trump presidencies. For the Q3 timeline see timeline of the first Trump presidency (2019 Q3).

== Timeline ==
=== April 2019 ===
Date	Events	Photos/videos
Monday, April 1		
Tuesday, April 2	President Trump holds a bilateral meeting with NATO Secretary General Jens Stoltenberg at the White House.	President Trump and NATO Secretary General Jens Stoltenberg
Wednesday, April 3		
Thursday, April 4	President Trump threatens to close the United States–Mexico border within one year if Mexico does not stop the "massive amounts of drugs" coming into the United States.	
Friday, April 5	President Trump visits Calexico, California, along the southern border and meets with Border Patrol personnel.; President Trump withdraws his nomination of Ronald Vitiello to be the director of Immigration and Customs Enforcement.	President Trump with a U.S. Customs and Border Protection officer
Saturday, April 6	President Trump speaks at the Republican Jewish Coalition in Las Vegas, Nevada.	President Trump speaks to members of Republican Jewish Coalition
Sunday, April 7	President Trump announces in a tweet that Department of Homeland Security Secretary Kirstjen Nielsen is resigning.	
Monday, April 8	General John E. Hyten is nominated to be the 11th Vice Chairman of the Joint Chiefs of Staff.; Secret Service director Randolph Alles to leave his position in May at President Trump's request.	
Tuesday, April 9	President Trump holds a bilateral meeting with Egyptian president Abdel Fattah el-Sisi at the White House.; President Trump has installed senior White House adviser Stephen Miller to be in charge of the administration's immigration policy.	President Trump and Egyptian president Abdel Fattah el-Sisi
Wednesday, April 10	Kevin McAleenan assumes the role of acting secretary of homeland security.	
Thursday, April 11	President Trump holds a bilateral meeting with South Korean president Moon Jae-in at the White House.; The Senate confirms David Bernhardt as the 53rd U.S. Secretary of the Interior in a vote of 56–41.; Secretary of the Treasury Department Steve Mnuchin advised the House Ways and Means Committee that he has "serious issues" with the committees request for recent Donald Trump tax returns.	President Trump and South Korean president Moon Jae-in
Friday, April 12	President Trump confirms reports that he is considering the release of detained undocumented immigrants into "sanctuary cities".; Linda McMahon's resignation becomes effective as head of the Small Business Administration. President Trump made the original announcement on March 29, 2019.	
Saturday, April 13		
Sunday, April 14		
Monday, April 15	Attorney General William Barr issues an order directing immigration judges to deny posting of bail by asylum seekers.	
Tuesday, April 16	President Trump uses the second veto of his Administration on a bipartisan resolution to end American involvement in the military campaign in Yemen. Congress had earlier voted to invoke the War Powers Act of 1973.	
Wednesday, April 17		
Thursday, April 18	Attorney General William Barr and Deputy Attorney General Rod Rosenstein hold a press conference on the Mueller Report and, soon after, release it to Congress and the American public.	
Friday, April 19		
Saturday, April 20		
Sunday, April 21		
Monday, April 22	President Trump and First Lady Melania Trump host the White House Easter Egg Roll.	President Trump and First Lady Melania Trump host the White House Easter Egg Roll
Tuesday, April 23		
Wednesday, April 24		
Thursday, April 25		
Friday, April 26	President Trump and Vice President Pence speak at National Rifle Association's annual convention in Indianapolis, Indiana.; President Trump holds a bilateral meeting with Japanese prime minister Shinzō Abe at the White House.	President Trump and Japanese prime minister Shinzō Abe
Saturday, April 27	President Trump and Japanese prime minister Shinzō Abe play golf together at the Trump National Golf Club.; President Trump holds a rally in Green Bay, Wisconsin.	President Trump speaks to supporters at a rally in Green Bay, Wisconsin
Sunday, April 28		
Monday, April 29	President Trump entertains the Baylor Lady Bear, 2019 College Basketball Playoff National Champions, at the White House with a menu of various fast foods.; Deputy Attorney General Rod Rosenstein submits a letter of resignation effective May 11.	
Tuesday, April 30		

=== May 2019 ===
Date	Events	Photos/videos
Wednesday, May 1	James M. Murray is sworn in as Director of the United States Secret Service.; Attorney General William Barr appeared before the Senate Judiciary Committee, answering questions about the Mueller Report.	
Thursday, May 2	President Trump speaks at the National Day of Prayer service in the Rose Garden.	President Trump speaks at the National Day of Prayer service
Friday, May 3	President Trump holds a bilateral meeting with Slovak prime minister Peter Pellegrini at the White House.	President Trump and Slovak prime minister Peter Pellegrini
Saturday, May 4		
Sunday, May 5		
Monday, May 6	President Trump presents the Commander-in-Chief's Trophy to the Army Black Knights football team.; President Trump presents the Presidential Medal of Freedom to golfer Tiger Woods.; Treasury Secretary Steven Mnuchin fails to meet the House Ways and Means Committee deadline to provide President Trump's tax returns.	President Trump with members of the Army Black Knights football team
Tuesday, May 7		
Wednesday, May 8	President Trump asserts executive privilege over the full Mueller Report.; President Trump holds a rally in Panama City Beach, Florida.; The House Judiciary Committee, in a 24–16 vote, moves to hold Attorney General William Barr in contempt of Congress for failing to deliver the unredacted version of the Mueller report.; House Intelligence Committee issues a subpoena to the Justice Department for all "counterintelligence and foreign intelligence" collected for the pre-redacted version of special counsel Robert Mueller's report.	President Trump speaks to supporters at a rally in Panama City, Florida
Thursday, May 9	President Trump entertains the Boston Red Sox, 2018 World Series Champions, at the White House. However, manager Alex Cora and several star players chose not to attend.	President Trump and some Boston Red Sox players
Friday, May 10	The Trump Administration raises tariffs on $200 billion worth of Chinese imports.; House Ways and Means Committee chairman Richard Neal subpoenas the Treasury Department and the Internal Revenue Service for the tax returns of President Trump.	
Saturday, May 11	Effective day of Deputy Attorney General Rod Rosenstein's resignation.	
Sunday, May 12		
Monday, May 13	President Trump holds a bilateral meeting with Hungarian prime minister Viktor Orbán at the White House.	President Trump and Hungarian prime minister Viktor Orbán
Tuesday, May 14	President Trump visits Cameron LNG Export Facility.	President Trump speaks to workers at the Cameron LNG Export Facility in Hackberry, Louisiana
Wednesday, May 15		
Thursday, May 16	President Trump holds a bilateral meeting with Swiss president Ueli Maurer at the White House.; President Trump proposes a new immigration plan.	President Trump and Swiss president Ueli Maurer
Friday, May 17	President Trump speaks at the National Association of Realtors Legislative Meetings and Trade Expo.; The Trump administration rejects a Democratic subpoena by the House of Representatives for President Trump's tax returns.	President Trump speaks at the Legislative Meetings and Trade Expo
Saturday, May 18		
Sunday, May 19		
Monday, May 20	A federal judge from the DC District Court denies President Trump's bid to quash a House Oversight Committee subpoena for years of his financial records from his accounting firm. The judge also declined a request by the president's lawyers to stay his order pending their appeal.; The Department of Justice moves to block former White House counsel Don McGahn from testifying to Congress about the Mueller report citing the separation of powers.; President Trump holds a rally in Montoursville, Pennsylvania.	President Trump speaks to supporters at a rally in Montoursville, Pennsylvania
Tuesday, May 21		
Wednesday, May 22	President Trump leaves a meeting on infrastructure with senior Democrats after only three minutes. Shortly afterwards, he holds a surprise press conference in the Rose Garden.	President Trump speaking in Rose Garden after the meeting with Congressional Democrats
Thursday, May 23		
Friday, May 24	President Trump travels to Japan aboard Air Force One for a four-day state visit.	
Saturday, May 25	President Trump arrives in Tokyo, Japan.; The New York Times reported the White House never followed through with stripping John Brennan of his security clearance, as Trump had asserted he had on August 15, 2018.	
Sunday, May 26	President Trump meets with Japanese prime minister Shinzō Abe at Mobara Country Club.; President Trump and Japanese prime minister Shinzō Abe attend a sumo tournament.	President Trump and Japanese prime minister Shinzō Abe at Mobara Country Club
Monday, May 27	President Trump holds a joint press conference with Japanese prime minister Shinzō Abe at the Akasaka Palace.; President Trump meets with Emperor Naruhito and Empress Masako at the Tokyo Imperial Palace.	President Trump and Emperor Naruhito at the Tokyo Imperial Palace
Tuesday, May 28	President Trump boards the USS Wasp (LHD-1) in Yokosuka, Japan.; President Trump departs Japan.	President Trump aboard the USS Wasp (LHD-1)
Wednesday, May 29	Robert Mueller announces his resignation as Special Counsel in a press conference and speaks publicly about his report.	
Thursday, May 30	President Trump delivers the commencement address at the U.S. Air Force Academy in Colorado Springs, Colorado.	President Trump delivers the commencement address
Friday, May 31		

=== June 2019 ===
Date	Events	Photos/videos
Saturday, June 1	President Trump announces via tweet that White House counsel Emmet Flood will be leaving his post on June 14.	
Sunday, June 2	President Trump delivers an evening speech at the Ford's Theater's annual fundraising gala.; President Trump and First Lady Melania Trump travel to the United Kingdom aboard Air Force One for a three-day state visit.	President Trump at the Ford's Theater
Monday, June 3	President Trump and First Lady Melania Trump travel arrive in London, United Kingdom.; President Trump and First Lady Melania Trump meet with Queen Elizabeth II at Buckingham Palace.; President Trump lays a wreath at the Tomb of the Unknown Warrior in Westminster Abbey.; President Trump and First Lady Melania Trump attend a state banquet hosted by Queen Elizabeth II at Buckingham Palace.; The chairman of the White House's Council of Economic Advisers, Kevin Hassett, announces he will soon be leaving his post.	President Trump and First Lady Melania Trump with Queen Elizabeth II at Buckingham Palace
Tuesday, June 4	President Trump holds a bilateral meeting and joint press conference with British prime minister Theresa May at 10 Downing Street.; President Trump and First Lady Melania Trump hosts a black-tie dinner at Winfield House.; Hope Hicks, a former aide to President Trump, and Annie Donaldson, a former McGahn aide, are instructed by the White House not to comply with House Judiciary Committee subpoenas.	A joint press conference between President Trump and British prime minister Theresa May at 10 Downing Street
Wednesday, June 5	President Trump holds a bilateral meeting with German Chancellor Angela Merkel.; President Trump attends the 75th anniversary of D-Day commemorative ceremonies in Portsmouth.; President Trump arrives in Shannon, Ireland.; President Trump holds a bilateral meeting with Irish Taoiseach Leo Varadkar.	President Trump and other world leaders mark the 75th anniversary of D-Day
Thursday, June 6	President Trump arrives in Caen, France.; President Trump attends the 75th anniversary of D-Day memorial ceremonies in Normandy.; President Trump holds a bilateral meeting with French president Emmanuel Macron at the Prefecture of Calvados.; President Trump returns to Shannon, Ireland.	President Trump delivers remarks at the 75th Commemoration of D-Day
Friday, June 7	President Trump drops threats of tariffs against Mexico after the United States reaches a deal with Mexico over Latin American immigration.	
Saturday, June 8		
Sunday, June 9		
Monday, June 10	President Trump presents the Borg-Warner trophy to the 103rd Indianapolis 500 Champion Team.	President Trump with members of the 103rd Indianapolis 500 Champion Team
Tuesday, June 11	President Trump visits Southwest Iowa Renewable Energy Facility.	President Trump speaks to workers at the Renewable Energy Facility in West Des Moines, Iowa
Wednesday, June 12	President Trump holds a bilateral meeting and joint press conference with Polish president Andrzej Duda at the White House.	President Trump and Polish president Andrzej Duda
Thursday, June 13	White House Press Secretary Sarah Sanders announces that she will be leaving her role on June 30.	
Friday, June 14	The Office of Special Counsel recommends Trump aide Kellyanne Conway be "removed from service" for violating the Hatch Act, which bans federal employees from political activity.	
Saturday, June 15		
Sunday, June 16		
Monday, June 17		
Tuesday, June 18	President Trump holds a rally in Orlando, Florida, and formally announces his reelection campaign for president in the upcoming 2020 election. During the rally President Trump vowed if "elected to a second term we will cure cancer and ends AIDS' and "come up with the cures to many, many problems, to many, many diseases".; President Trump withdraws the nomination of Patrick Shanahan to be Secretary of Defense and names Mark Esper as his replacement.; President Trump reaffirms that the five teenagers in the Central Park jogger case were guilty, refusing to apologize for the ads he published in 1989 calling for the death penalty for them.	President Trump announces his 2020 presidential re-election in Orlando, Florida
Wednesday, June 19	President Trump presents the Presidential Medal of Freedom to economist Arthur Laffer.; EPA administrator Andrew Wheeler announces a roll-back of the Clean Power Plan. States will now be allowed to set their own carbon emissions standards for coal-fired power plants. EPA authority on carbon emissions will be limited going forward.	President Trump awards the Presidential Medal of Freedom to Arthur Laffer
Thursday, June 20	President Trump holds a bilateral meeting with Canadian prime minister Justin Trudeau at the White House.	President Trump and Canadian prime minister Justin Trudeau
Friday, June 21	President Trump warns Iran after its Revolutionary Guard acknowledges shooting down an American drone in the Strait of Hormuz. Iran claims the drone "violated Iranian airspace", while U.S. military claims the drone was shot down over "international airspace" and the action was "an unprovoked attack on a U.S. surveillance asset".; President Trump and First Lady Melania Trump hosts the second congressional picnic in the White House South Lawn.	President Trump and Vice President Pence and their wives at the 2019 Congressional Picnic
Saturday, June 22	President Trump announces that he will delay ICE raids on immigrants living illegally in 10 major cities by two weeks to allow Congress to develop a solution for the United States–Mexico border problem.	
Sunday, June 23		
Monday, June 24	President Trump announces retaliatory sanctions on Iran in response to Iran's actions in taking down a United States military drone on June 20.	President Trump signs an Executive Order placing further sanctions against Iran
Tuesday, June 25	President Trump names Stephanie Grisham as the next White House press secretary.; Diplomatic Protocol Chief Sean Lawler is suspended prior to the G-20 summit.; President Trump presents the Medal of Honor to Army Staff Sergeant David Bellavia.	Staff Sergeant David Bellavia receives the Medal of Honor
Wednesday, June 26	President Trump travels to Asia for a four-day trip to visit foreign leaders at the 2019 G20 Summit in Osaka, Japan from June 28 to June 29.; Robert Mueller announces he will testify before the House Intelligence Committee and the Judiciary Committee in public hearings to be held on July 17.; EPA official William Wehrum resigns amid claims of possible ethics violations.; Presidential aide Kellyanne Conway fails to appear at a House Oversight Committee meeting and will be subpoenaed about her possible violations of the Hatch Act.	
Thursday, June 27	Mark Morgan is picked to take over the U.S. Border Patrol and Matt Albence will return as acting director of ICE.; Supreme Court blocks a citizenship question from being included in the 2020 census and says "the administration provided a contrived justification" for including it.; President Trump arrives in Osaka, Japan.; President Trump holds a bilateral meeting and dinner with Australian prime minister Scott Morrison.	President Trump and Australian prime minister Scott Morrison
Friday, June 28	President Trump attends the G20 summit hosted by Japanese prime minister Shinzō Abe.; President Trump holds bilateral meetings with Brazilian president Jair Bolsonaro, Japanese prime minister Shinzō Abe, Indian prime minister Narendra Modi, German chancellor Angela Merkel and Russian president Vladimir Putin.	G-20 leaders at the 2019 Osaka Summit
Saturday, June 29	President Trump holds a bilateral meeting with Chinese president Xi Jinping, declaring a truce in the trade war.; President Trump holds a bilateral meeting Turkish president Recep Tayyip Erdoğan.; President Trump arrives in Seoul, South Korea.; Asked about Putin's comment that "western-style liberalism is obsolete," Trump replied "it's so sad to look at what's happening in San Francisco and a couple of other cities which are run by an extraordinary group of liberal people. I don't know what they're thinking."	President Trump and Chinese president Xi Jinping
Sunday, June 30	President Trump holds a bilateral meeting and joint press conference with South Korean president Moon Jae-in at the Blue House.; President Trump visits the Korean Demilitarized Zone (DMZ), accompanied by South Korean president Moon Jae-in.; President Trump briefly walks into the northern side of the Joint Security Area of the Korean Demilitarized Zone (DMZ), accompanied by North Korean leader Kim Jong Un and becomes the first sitting U.S. president to enter North Korea.; President Trump returns to the southern side of the Joint Security Area of the Korean Demilitarized Zone (DMZ) with North Korean leader Kim Jong Un.; President Trump participates in a DMZ summit with South Korean president Moon Jae-in and North Korean leader Kim Jong Un at the Inter-Korean Freedom House on the southern side of the Joint Security Area of the Korean Demilitarized Zone (DMZ).; President Trump holds a bilateral meeting with North Korean leader Kim Jong Un at the Inter-Korean Freedom House.	President Trump and South Korean Moon Jae-in President Trump with North Korean leader Kim Jong Un and South Korean president Moon Jae-in

== See also ==
- First 100 days of the first Trump presidency – Period from January to April 2017
- List of executive actions by Donald Trump
- Lists of presidential trips made by Donald Trump (international trips)
- First presidential transition of Donald Trump – Transfer of presidential power from Barack Obama to Donald Trump
- Timeline of the 2016 United States presidential election

U.S. presidential administration timelines
Preceded by First Trump presidency (2019 Q1)	First Trump presidency (2019 Q2)	Succeeded by First Trump presidency (2019 Q3)
