= 2019 Trump–Zelenskyy phone call =

Meeting over the Russo-Ukrainian war

On July 25, 2019, U.S. president Donald Trump and Ukrainian president Volodymyr Zelenskyy had a telephone call wherein they discussed a proposed ceasefire for the Russo-Ukrainian war. The ceasefire, brokered between Russian president Vladimir Putin and Zelenskyy, was put together by French president Emmanuel Macron and German chancellor Angela Merkel. The call became notable for multiple reasons:

- The public information from the White House's record of the monitored call from the U.S.'s perspective mentioned Zelenskyy's criticism of Macron and Merkel.
- It also became the premise for the 2019 Trump–Ukraine scandal, which in turn led to the first impeachment of Donald Trump.
- It was mentioned by Zelenskyy during the 2025 Trump–Zelenskyy Oval Office meeting.

== Background ==
In 2014, Russia had annexed the Crimea region of Ukraine and had backed pro-Russian separatists fighting in the eastern region of the country. On December 10, 2019, a ceasefire agreement was signed by Zelenskyy, Putin, Macron and Merkel.

== Controversy ==
On July 25, 2019, Zelenskyy had a telephone conversation about the ceasefire agreement to U.S. president Trump. Trump mentioned criticism of Germany and Europe. To this, Zelenskyy replied:

Yes, you are absolutely right. Not only 100%, but actually 1000%, and I can tell you the following; I did talk to Angela Merkel and I did meet with her. I also met and talked with Macron, and I told them that they are not doing quite as much as they need to be doing on the issues with the sanctions. They are not enforcing the sanctions. They are not working as much as they should work for Ukraine.

The transcript was later declassified by Trump on September 25, 2019. This part of the conversation is mentioned by Zelenskyy in the 2025 Trump–Zelenskyy meeting for a proposed 2025 ceasefire between Russia and Ukraine, for the expanded military conflict due to the Russia's invasion of Ukraine that had continued since 2022. For President Trump and the U.S. Congress, the latter part of the same conversation became part of the foundations of the first impeachment of Donald Trump. The following statement was in the declassified transcript of this conversation. Zelenskyy had stated:

We are ready to continue to cooperate for the next steps specifically we are almost. Ready to buy more Javelins from the United States for defense purposes.

To which President Trump replied: (Note: This conversation took place the day after Robert Mueller had stated that the Mueller special counsel investigation into the Russian interference in the 2016 United States elections found that Trump could only be prosecuted after leaving office for obstruction of justice.)

I would like you to do us a favor, though, because our country has been through a lot and Ukraine knows a lot about it. I would like you to find out what happened with this whole situation with Ukraine, they say Crowdstrike... I guess you have one of your wealthy people... The server, they say Ukraine has it. There are a lot of things that went on, the whole situation.

It was later reported that there was a conspiracy theory claiming that the prior Ukrainian government had used the cybersecurity company Crowdstrike to hack the Democratic Party computers in 2016 and blame Russia.

The call transcript was reconstructed from the original call by means of notes and voice recognition software. There were ellipses of the White House transcript due to what could be words that had trailed off or were inaudible. However, a White House official would later state in testimony to impeachment investigators that some words and phrases were deliberately left out. According to testimony, what was deliberately removed was the following:

- Trump asking about the existence of recordings of former vice president Joe Biden (the political opponent to Trump at that time).
- Zelenskyy mentioning Burisma Holdings, a Ukrainian energy company that had employed Biden's son Hunter as a board member of the corporation.

The first impeachment of Donald Trump was initiated due to the appearance of withholding military aid as a means of pressuring Zelenskyy to pursue investigations of Joe Biden and his son Hunter.
