= Oregon Historic District =

Historic district in Ohio, United States

- U.S. National Register of Historic Places
- U.S. Historic district
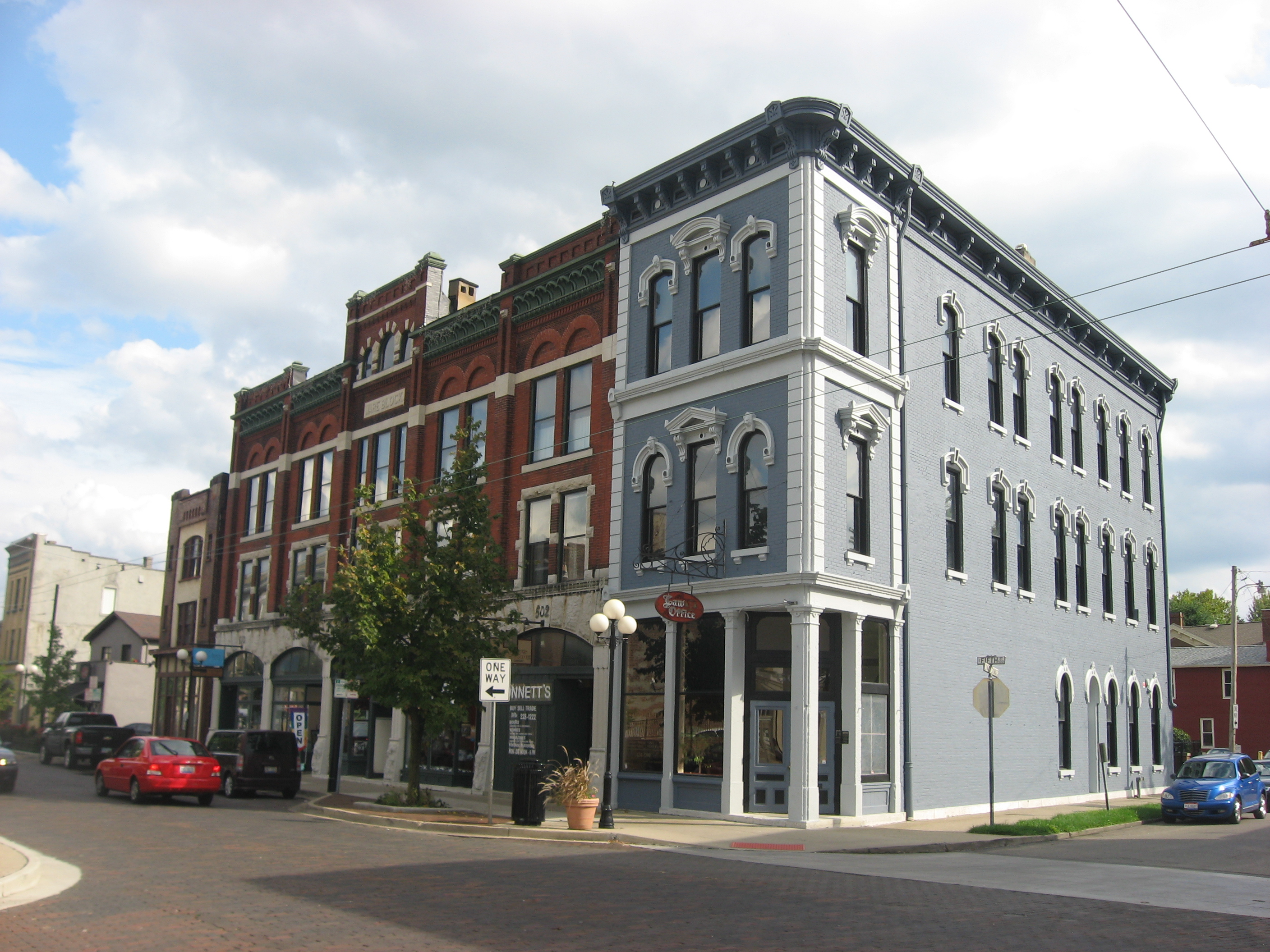
- Commercial architecture in the district

- Location within Ohio Location within the United States
- Location: Between Patterson Blvd. and Wayne Ave. N to Gates St. and S to U.S. 35, Dayton, Ohio
- Coordinates: 39°45′19″N 84°11′4″W
- Built: 1830s
- Architectural style: Queen Anne, Federal and Greek Revival
- NRHP reference No.: 75001506
- Added to NRHP: 27 March 1975

The Oregon Historic District is a neighborhood in Dayton, Ohio. The Oregon District includes one of the earliest surviving combinations of commercial and residential architecture in Dayton. Examples of Dayton's architectural history from 1820 to 1915 line the brick streets and lanes in this 12 square block area. Styles range from Federal to Queen Anne. Excellent examples of late Victorian commercial and residential architecture illustrate both the entrepreneurial success and the increasing affluence of many Oregon merchants and residents. The district is populated with art galleries, specialty shops, pubs, nightclubs, and coffee houses.

== Historic district ==
Oregon's National Register boundaries

The origin of the name "Oregon" for the area is uncertain but is known to have been in use at least as early as 1845. In 1974, Oregon was registered on the National Register of Historic Places, between Patterson Blvd. and Wayne Ave., north to Gates St. and south to U.S. Route 35, and Downtown Dayton (No. 75001506). City of Dayton Ordinance #24358-9.

== Architecture ==
The architecture of the Oregon Historic District includes examples of Federal, Italianate, Greek Revival and Queen Anne.

== People ==
- Daniel C. Cooper
- John H. Balsley

== See also ==
- National Register of Historic Places listings in Dayton, Ohio
