= List of presidential trips made by Donald Trump (2018) =

This is a list of presidential trips made by Donald Trump during 2018, the second year of his first presidency as the 45th president of the United States.

This list excludes trips made within Washington, D.C., the US federal capital in which the White House, the official residence and principal workplace of the president, is located. Also excluded are trips to Camp David, the country residence of the president, as well as Joint Base Andrews. International trips are included. Here are the number of visits per state or territory he traveled to:

- One: Arizona, Guam, Hawaii, Kansas, Kentucky, Michigan, New Hampshire, and South Dakota
- Two: California, Illinois, Iowa, Minnesota, Mississippi, North Dakota, South Carolina and Wisconsin
- Three: Georgia, Nevada and Texas
- Four: Montana, New York, North Carolina and Tennessee
- Five: Indiana
- Six: Missouri and West Virginia
- Seven: Maryland and Ohio
- Eight: New Jersey and Pennsylvania
- Fourteen: Florida
- Twenty-six: Virginia
Locations in the contiguous United States that President Donald Trump has visited in 2018.

January (blue) – February (yellow) – March (brown) – April (pink) – May (grey) – June (orange) – July (purple) – August (light blue) – September (magenta) – October (green) – November (red) –

December (light green)
Locations in Hawaii President Donald Trump has visited.
Locations in Guam President Donald Trump has visited.

Map of trips made by Donald Trump within the United States in 2018: Washington, D.C. 7 or more visits 6 visits 5 visits 4 visits 3 visits 2 visits 1 visit No visits

== January ==
Country/ U.S. state	Areas visited	Dates	Details	Image
Florida	Mar-a-Lago, Palm Beach	January 1	President Trump and First Lady Melania Trump continued their vacation in Florida. President Trump traveled to the Trump International Golf Club in West Palm Beach, where he played golf with Fred Funk and Taylor Funk, before departing for Washington, D.C., via Palm Beach International Airport.	
Tennessee	Nashville	January 8	Arriving via Nashville International Airport, President Trump addressed the American Farm Bureau Federation at their 99th Annual Conference at the Gaylord Opryland Resort & Convention Center. Trump was the first sitting president to speak at the AFBF Annual Conference since 1992.	TrumpNashvilleJan'18
Georgia	Atlanta	January 8	Arriving via Dobbins Air Reserve Base, President Trump attended the CFP National Championship Game between the University of Alabama and the University of Georgia at the Mercedes-Benz Stadium.	President Donald J. Trump participates in on field ceremonies at the 2018 College Football Playoff National Championship between the University of Alabama Crimson Tide and the University of Georgia Bulldogs
Maryland	Bethesda	January 12	President Trump traveled to the METU Suite of Walter Reed National Military Medical Center in Bethesda, Maryland, for his annual physical examination.	President Donald J. Trump talks with, from left to right, with Capt. Mark Kobelja, Director of Walter Reed National Military Medical Center; Dr. Ronny Jackson, Physician to the President; and Dr. James Jones, physical to the President and medical director of the Medical Evaluation and Treatment Unit, Friday January 12, 2018, in Bethesda, MD, following the President's annual physical at the medical facility.
Florida	Mar-a-Lago, Palm Beach	January 12–15	President Trump spent Martin Luther King Jr. Weekend at his Mar-a-Lago Resort. President Trump traveled to the Trump International Golf Club in West Palm Beach on January 13, 14 and 15.	
Pennsylvania	Pittsburgh, Coraopolis	January 18	Arriving via Pittsburgh IAP Air Reserve Station, President Trump visited H&K Equipment in Coraopolis, Pennsylvania. In addition to touring the facility, President Trump lent his support for congressional candidate Rick Saccone, who is running in a special election for the seat vacated by Tim Murphy.	President Donald J. Trump offers a fist pump to employees at the conclusion of his speech at the H&K Equipment Company, Thursday, January 18, 2018, in Coraopolis Pa.
Switzerland	Davos	January 25–26	Arriving via Zürich Airport, President Trump flew to Davos via Marine One, landing at the Intercontinental Davos Landing Zone. He stayed at the InterContinental Davos. He attended the World Economic Forum, where he spoke on January 26. He is the first sitting U.S. president to attend the meeting since Bill Clinton in 2000. He held bilateral meetings with British prime minister Theresa May, Israeli prime minister Benjamin Netanyahu, Swiss president Alain Berset and Rwandan president Paul Kagame.	Greeted by U.S. Ambassador McMullen, WEF Executive chairman Klaus Schwab, Hilde Schwab, Davos Mayor Tarzisius Caviezel, WEF managing director Alois Zwinggi (left to right).

== February ==
Country/ U.S. state	Areas visited	Dates	Details	Image
West Virginia	White Sulphur Springs	February 1	Arriving via Greenbrier Valley Airport, President Trump traveled to White Sulphur Springs, West Virginia, to attend the Republican Party retreat at the Greenbrier.	President Donald J. Trump delivers remarks at the 2018 Congressional Institute retreat at the Greenbrier Resort, Thursday, February 1, 2018, in White Sulphur Springs, West Virginia.
Virginia	Sterling	February 2	President Trump traveled to the U.S. Customs and Border Protection National Targeting Center in Sterling, Virginia, where he met with homeland security officials.	President Donald J. Trump participates in a U.S. Customs and Border Protection round table discussion at the U.S. Customs and Border Protection National Targeting Center, Friday, February 2, 2018, in Sterling, Virginia.
Florida	Mar-a-Lago, Palm Beach	February 2–4	President Trump and First Lady Melania Trump traveled to his Mar-a-Lago Resort via Palm Beach International Airport. Trump traveled to the Trump International Golf Club on February 3 and 4.	President Donald J. Trump and First Lady Melania Trump watch a performance by the Florida Atlantic University marching band and cheerleaders prior to Super Bowl LII.
Ohio	Cincinnati	February 5	Arriving via Cincinnati Municipal Lunken Airport, President Trump traveled to Blue Ash, Ohio, to tout tax reform at the Sheffer Corporation. First Lady Melania Trump visited the Cincinnati Children's Hospital alongside Kellyanne Conway.	President Donald J. Trump prepares to sign a worker's hat while visiting with employees during his tour of the Sheffer Corporation, Monday, February 5, 2018, in Blue Ash, Ohio.
Florida	Parkland, Mar-a-Lago, Fort Lauderdale, Palm Beach	February 16–19	Arriving via Palm Beach International Airport, President Trump and First Lady Melania Trump traveled to the Broward Health North Hospital in Parkland, Florida following the school shooting that occurred at Marjory Stoneman Douglas High School. Trump subsequently held a round-table discussion with law enforcement at the Broward County Sheriff's Office in Fort Lauderdale, Florida, before departing for Mar-a-Lago. Trump traveled to the Trump International Golf Club on February 18, where he greeted visitors in a dining area.	Photo of the Day- February 20, 2018 (39509493745)
Maryland	Oxon Hill	February 23	President Trump delivered remarks at the Conservative Political Action Conference at the Gaylord National Resort & Convention Center.	

== March ==
Country/ U.S. state	Areas visited	Dates	Details	Image
North Carolina	Charlotte	March 2	Arriving via Charlotte Douglas International Airport, President Trump and First Lady Melania Trump traveled to the Billy Graham Library in North Carolina to attend the funeral of Billy Graham.	President Donald J. Trump honors the late Reverend Billy Graham.
Florida	Mar-a-Lago, Palm Beach	March 2–3	Following the funeral of Billy Graham, President Trump traveled to his Mar-a-Lago resort in Palm Beach. While in Florida, President Trump traveled to the Trump International Golf Club, and met with donors raising funds for his 2020 re-election campaign.	
Pennsylvania	Moon Township	March 10	Arriving via the Atlantic Aviation fixed-base operator by Pittsburgh International Airport, President Trump traveled to Moon Township and campaigned for Congressional candidate Rick Saccone in the Atlantic Aviation hangar, prior to the special election on March 13.	
California	San Diego, Los Angeles	March 13–14	Trump arrived at Marine Corps Air Station Miramar, Where he addressed troops in an air hangar. From there, he traveled to Otay Mesa near the US–Mexican Border via Brown Field Municipal Airport to look at border wall prototypes. After traveling through Los Angeles International Airport and Santa Monica Airport, President Trump attended a Republican fundraiser at the Beverly Park residence of Ed Glazier. Trump spent the night at the InterContinental Los Angeles Downtown Hotel in Wilshire Grand Center.	President Donald J. Trump delivers remarks to military service members at Marine Corps Air Station Miramar, Tuesday, March 13, 2018, in San Diego, California.
Missouri	St. Louis	March 14	Arriving via St. Louis Lambert International Airport, President Trump traveled to St. Louis to tour the Boeing facility. While at the Boeing plant, Trump participated in an economic roundtable, with topics including tax cuts and the proposed tariffs. Following his time at the Boeing plant, Trump participated in a fundraising event for Senate candidate Josh Hawley at the Frontenac Hilton Hotel.	President Donald J. Trump at the Boeing Building 75.
Virginia	Sterling	March 18	President Trump traveled to the Trump National Golf Club, Washington, D.C. in Sterling, Virginia.	
New Hampshire	Manchester	March 19	Arriving via Manchester-Boston Regional Airport, President Trump traveled to Manchester where he delivered remarks regarding the opioid crisis at Manchester Community College and visited the Manchester Central Fire station.	President Trump delivers remarks on the Opioid Crisis, March 19, 2018.
Florida	Mar-a-Lago, Palm Beach	March 23–25	President Trump and First Lady Melania Trump traveled to Mar-a-Lago for the weekend.	Marine One, 25 March 2018
Virginia	McLean	March 27	President Trump traveled to the private residence of Giuseppe Cecchi in McLean, Virginia for a private donor event.	
Ohio	Richfield	March 29	Arriving via Cleveland Hopkins International Airport, President Trump delivered a speech regarding infrastructure, among other topics, at the Local 18 Richfield Training Facility.	President Donald J. Trump delivers remarks at Local 18 of the International Union of Operating Engineers apprenticeship and training site, Thursday, March 29, 2018, in Richfield, Ohio, promoting the benefits of the Administration's infrastructure initiative to improve the Nation's roads, bridges, railways and waterways.
Florida	Mar-a-Lago, Palm Beach	March 29 – April 1	President Trump traveled to his Mar-a-Lago resort to spend the Easter holiday.	President Donald J. Trump walks with Rev. James R. Harlan, rector of the Church of Bethesda-by-the-Sea, following Easter church service, Sunday, April 1, 2018, in Palm Beach, Florida.

== April ==
Country/ U.S. state	Areas visited	Dates	Details	Image
West Virginia	White Sulphur Springs	April 5	President Trump traveled to West Virginia to hold a round-table discussion on tax reform at the White Sulphur Springs Civic Center.	President Donald J. Trump is applauded at the conclusion of a roundtable discussion on tax reform, at the White Sulphur Springs Civic Center, Thursday, April 5, 2018, in White Sulphur Springs, West Virginia.
Virginia	Sterling	April 15	President Trump traveled to the Trump National Golf Club in Sterling, Virginia, where he played golf with Bret Baier, Joe Hockey, and Mick Mulvaney.	
Florida	Hialeah, Mar-a-Lago, West Palm Beach, Key West	April 16–22	Arriving via Miami International Airport, President Trump hosted a roundtable on tax cuts for Florida small businesses at the Bucky Dent Gymnasium. The president subsequently traveled to Mar-a-Lago. Following his roundtable discussion in Hialeah, President Trump traveled to his Mar-a-Lago resort to host Japanese Prime Minister Shinzō Abe for a summit. On April 18, Trump and Abe traveled to the Trump International Golf Club in West Palm Beach to play golf. On April 19, President Trump visited Joint Interagency Task Force South at Naval Air Station Key West, to be briefed on drug interdiction efforts. The president returned to Trump International Golf Club in West Palm Beach on April 20 and 21.	President Donald J. Trump and Japanese Prime Minister Shinzo Abe meet for their one on one meeting, Tuesday, April 17, 2018, at Mar-a-Lago in West Palm Beach, Florida.
Virginia	Fairfax County	April 23	President Trump hosted French president Emmanuel Macron at Mount Vernon in Fairfax County, Virginia.	President Donald J. Trump and First Lady Melania Trump with President Macron and Mrs. Macron of France at Mount Vernon.
Virginia	Sterling	April 28	President Trump traveled to the Trump National Golf Club in Sterling, Virginia.	
Michigan	Washington Township	April 28	Arriving via Selfridge Air National Guard Base, President Trump attended a rally at Total Sports Park in Washington Township.	

== May ==
Country/ U.S. state	Areas visited	Dates	Details	Image
Texas	Dallas	May 4	Arriving via Dallas Love Field Airport, President Trump addressed a National Rifle Association convention at the Kay Bailey Hutchison Convention Center in Dallas.	
Ohio	Cleveland	May 5	Arriving via Burke Lakefront Airport, President Trump traveled to Public Auditorium in Cleveland to hold a roundtable event with the purpose of promoting the Republican tax bill. While at the event, he touted his "America First" agenda and boosted the candidacy of Republican Senate candidate Jim Renacci. Afterwards, he attended a fundraiser for the RNC at the Ritz-Carlton Hotel, where around 250 donors were in attendance and an estimated $3 million was raised.	
Virginia	Sterling	May 6	President Trump traveled to the Trump National Golf Club in Sterling, Virginia, where he met with Rudy Giuliani.	
Maryland	Prince George's County	May 10	President Trump traveled to Joint Base Andrews in Prince George's County, Maryland, where he met with detainees released from North Korea.	
Indiana	Elkhart	May 10	Arriving via South Bend International Airport, President Trump held a rally at North Side Middle School to support Indiana Republican candidates.	
Virginia	Sterling	May 12	President Trump traveled to Sterling, Virginia, to play golf at Trump National Golf Club.	
Virginia	Sterling	May 13	President Trump traveled to Sterling, Virginia, to play golf at Trump National Golf Club.	
Maryland	Bethesda	May 14	President Trump made a first trip to Walter Reed National Military Medical Center to visit his wife, First Lady Melania Trump, following a procedure on her kidney.	
Maryland	Bethesda	May 15	President Trump made a second trip to Walter Reed National Military Medical Center to visit his wife, First Lady Melania Trump, following a procedure on her kidney.	
Maryland	Bethesda	May 16	President Trump made a third trip to Walter Reed National Military Medical Center to visit his wife, First Lady Melania Trump, following a procedure on her kidney.	
Virginia	Langley	May 21	President Trump participated in the swearing-in ceremony for the new CIA director Gina Haspel at the George Bush Center for Intelligence.	
New York	Bethpage, New York City	May 23	President Trump traveled to the Morrelly Homeland Security Center in Bethpage, New York, and participated in a roundtable on immigration, which included the discussion of the issue of the MS-13 gang. Trump then attended a roundtable and dinner with supporters at the Lotte New York Palace Hotel.	President Donald J. Trump meets with members of the Bethpage, NY Fire Department.
Maryland	Annapolis	May 25	President Trump delivered the Commencement Address at the United States Naval Academy Graduation Ceremony.	
Virginia	Sterling	May 26	President Trump traveled to the Trump National Golf Club in Sterling, Virginia.	
Virginia	Sterling	May 27	President Trump traveled to the Trump National Golf Club in Sterling, Virginia.	
Virginia	Arlington	May 28	President Trump traveled to Arlington National Cemetery for Memorial Day, where he participated in a wreath-laying ceremony at the Tomb of the Unknown Soldier and delivered remarks at the Arlington Memorial Amphitheater.	
Tennessee	Nashville	May 29	President Trump traveled to Nashville to hold a rally for Republican Senate candidate Marsha Blackburn at the Nashville Municipal Auditorium.	
Texas	Houston, Dallas	May 31	President Trump traveled to Houston where he met with survivors and first responders of the 2018 Santa Fe High School shooting in a hangar of the Coast Guard Air Station Houston. Following this meeting, President Trump traveled to the St. Regis Hotel in Houston, where he held a roundtable with supporters and attended a National Republican Senatorial Committee luncheon. Trump then left for Dallas where he attended a private fundraiser at the Adolphus Hotel before returning to Washington.	

== June ==
Country/ U.S. state	Areas visited	Dates	Details	Image
Canada	La Malbaie	June 8–9	Arriving via CFB Bagotville, President Trump traveled from there on board a Marine One to Fairmont Le Manoir Richelieu Landing Zone in La Malbaie, Quebec, to attend the G7 Summit at the Fairmont Le Manoir Richelieu. President Trump also held bilateral meetings with Canadian prime minister Justin Trudeau and French president Emmanuel Macron.	
Singapore	Central Area, Sentosa	June 10–12	On June 10, President Trump arriving via Paya Lebar Air Base. President Trump stayed at the Shangri-La Hotel Singapore. On June 11, President Trump held the bilateral meeting with Singaporean prime minister Lee Hsien Loong at The Istana. On June 12, President Trump attended the first summit meeting with North Korean leader Kim Jong-un at the Capella Singapore on Sentosa.	
Guam	Yigo	June 13	President Trump landed at Andersen Air Force Base in Guam, where he met with Governor Eddie Baza Calvo.	
Hawaii	Honolulu	June 12	Air Force One stopped over at Joint Base Pearl Harbor–Hickam.	
Virginia	Sterling	June 16	President Trump traveled to Trump National Golf Club in Sterling, Virginia.	
Virginia	Sterling	June 17	President Trump traveled to Trump National Golf Club in Sterling, Virginia, where he played 18 holes of golf.	
Minnesota	Duluth	June 20	Arriving via Duluth International Airport, President Trump traveled to Duluth to attend a roundtable discussion with American workers at a warehouse at the Port of Duluth-Superior. He later held a rally at the AMSOIL Arena where he endorsed congressional candidate Pete Stauber.	
Nevada	Las Vegas	June 23	Arriving via McCarran International Airport, President Trump addressed the 2018 Nevada Republican Party State Convention at the Suncoast Hotel and Casino in Las Vegas. He also held a business roundtable to discuss tax reform with supporters at the South Point Hotel, Casino & Spa.	President Donald J. Trump participates in a roundtable discussion on tax reform.
Virginia	Sterling	June 24	President Trump traveled to Trump National Golf Club in Sterling, Virginia.	
South Carolina	West Columbia	June 25	Landing at the Eagle Aviation Terminal of Columbia Metropolitan Airport, President Trump held a rally to support Governor Henry McMaster at Airport High School.	
North Dakota	Fargo	June 27	Arriving via Hector International Airport, President Trump held a rally at the Scheels Arena to support Representative Kevin Cramer for the upcoming Senate election.	President Donald J. Trump: A Conversation With America's Future.
Wisconsin	Milwaukee, Mount Pleasant	June 27–28	Landing at General Mitchell Air National Guard Base, the President traveled to Milwaukee, Wisconsin, following a rally in North Dakota, where he stayed overnight at The Pfister Hotel. On June 28, President Trump attended a breakfast fundraiser at the hotel for the Republican National Committee before traveling by motorcade to Mount Pleasant to attend the groundbreaking for Foxconn's North American manufacturing plant.	President Donald J. Trump participates in the groundbreaking ceremony of the Foxconn Facility
New Jersey	Bedminster	June 29 – July 1	President Trump traveled to Trump National Golf Club in Bedminster, New Jersey.	

== July ==
Country/ U.S. state	Areas visited	Dates	Details	Image
West Virginia	White Sulphur Springs	July 3	Arriving via Greenbrier Valley Airport, President Trump spoke at the Salute for Service military charity dinner at The Greenbrier resort.	
Virginia	Sterling	July 4	President Trump traveled to Trump National Golf Club in Sterling, Virginia.	
Montana	Great Falls	July 5	Arriving via Great Falls International Airport, President Trump held a rally to support Senate candidate Matt Rosendale at the Four Seasons Arena.	
New Jersey	Bedminster	July 5–8	President Trump traveled to Trump National Golf Club in Bedminster, New Jersey.	
Belgium	Brussels	July 10–12	President Trump and First Lady Melania Trump traveled to Brussels, arriving via Melsbroek Air Base on July 10. President Trump attended the 2018 NATO summit. President Trump also held bilateral meetings with French president Emmanuel Macron and German Chancellor Angela Merkel.	President Donald J. Trump and Secretary General Jens Stoltenberg during a NATO family photo.
United Kingdom	London, Blenheim Palace, Chequers, Windsor Castle, Turnberry	July 12–15	President Trump and First Lady Melania Trump traveled the United Kingdom, arriving via Stansted Airport on July 12. President Trump attended a black-tie dinner hosted by Prime Minister Theresa May at Blenheim Palace before spending the night at Winfield House in London. On July 13, President Trump watched a joint special forces operation with Prime Minister May. President Trump and Prime Minister May held a bilateral meeting and joint press conference at Chequers where he discussed her Brexit plan and a future US-UK trade deal. President Trump and First Lady Melania Trump meet with Queen Elizabeth II at Windsor Castle. In the evening, President Trump and First Lady Melania Trump departed for Scotland, arriving at Prestwick Airport before departing via motorcade to visit his Turnberry golf course in Turnberry where he spent weekend.	
Finland	Helsinki	July 15–16	President Trump and First Lady Melania Trump traveled to Helsinki, arriving via Helsinki Airport in the evening on July 15. President Trump then traveled by motorcade to the Hilton Helsinki Kalastajatorppa where he spent the night in advance of the summit meeting with Russian president Vladimir Putin. On July 16, President Trump joined Finnish president Sauli Niinistö for breakfast at his official residence Mäntyniemi before traveling to the Presidential Palace for his meeting with President Putin. After meeting behind closed doors both privately and with advisers, presidents Trump and Putin held a joint news conference.	
New Jersey	Bedminster	July 20–22	President Trump traveled to Trump National Golf Club in Bedminster, New Jersey.	
Missouri	Kansas City	July 24	Arriving via Kansas City International Airport, President Trump addressed the VFW and participated in a luncheon supporting Josh Hawley in his bid for the Missouri US senate seat.	President Donald J. Trump delivers remarks at the Veterans of Foreign Wars national conference.
Iowa	Peosta	July 26	Arriving via Dubuque Regional Airport, President Trump traveled to Peosta, Iowa, where he toured the advanced manufacturing lab at Northeast Iowa Community College and participated in a roundtable discussion on workforce development.	
Illinois	Granite City	July 26	Arriving via St. Louis Lambert International Airport, President Trump traveled to Granite City, Illinois, where he toured the Granite City Works Hot Strip Mill. President Trump then traveled to Granite City Works Steel Coil Warehouse, where he delivered remarks on trade.	President Donald J. Trump delivers remarks on trade and celebrates the recently reopened Granite City Works steel plant.
New Jersey	Bedminster	July 27–29	President Trump traveled to Trump National Golf Club in Bedminster, New Jersey.	
Florida	Tampa	July 31	Arriving via Tampa International Airport, President Trump traveled to Tampa Bay Technical High School to discuss the Carl D. Perkins Vocational and Technical Education Act. President Trump subsequently held a rally at Expo Hall in the Florida State Fairgrounds supporting Ron DeSantis in the upcoming gubernatorial election.	President Donald J. Trump ceremonially signs the Perkins Career and Technical Education Act.

== August ==
Country/ U.S. state	Areas to be visited	Dates	Details	Image
Pennsylvania	Wilkes-Barre	August 2	Arriving via Wilkes-Barre/Scranton International Airport, President Trump held a roundtable with supporters. Following that he held a rally in support of Representative Lou Barletta for the US Senate at Mohegan Sun Arena at Casey Plaza.	
New Jersey	Bedminster	August 2–4	President Trump traveled to Trump National Golf Club in Bedminster, New Jersey.	
Ohio	Lewis Center	August 4	Arriving via John Glenn Columbus International Airport, President Trump held a rally at Olentangy Orange High School in support of Troy Balderson in the upcoming Ohio congressional district special election.	
New Jersey	Bedminster	August 4–13	President Trump returned to the Trump National Golf Club in Bedminster, New Jersey, from Ohio, where he signed an executive order imposing sanctions on Iran. On August 7, President Trump hosted an official dinner for business executives at the club's Orchid Room. On August 8, President Trump met with Bikers for Trump at the club's grand ballroom. President Trump also held a personal meeting with Apple CEO Tim Cook.	President Donald J. Trump signs an Executive Order in Bedminster, New Jersey, entitled "Reimposing Certain Sanctions with Respect to Iran."
New York	Fort Drum, Utica	August 13	Arriving via Wheeler-Sack Army Airfield, President Trump traveled to Fort Drum, New York to participate in the signing of the John S. McCain National Defense Authorization Act for Fiscal Year 2019 in Hangar 2060. Following the signing, President Trump traveled to Utica, New York, arriving via Griffiss International Airport, where he held a roundtable with supporters and participated in a fundraiser for Representative Claudia Tenney at the DoubleTree by Hilton Hotel Utica.	
New York	Southampton	August 17	Arriving via Francis S. Gabreski Airport, President Trump traveled to Southampton, New York where he attended a roundtable with supporters and gave remarks at a luncheon at a private residence. The event was a joint fundraiser benefiting Donald J. Trump for President, Inc. and the Republican National Committee.	
New Jersey	Bedminster	August 17–19	Following a fundraising event in Southampton, New York, President Trump traveled to his private golf club in Bedminster, arriving via the Morristown Municipal Airport.	
West Virginia	Charleston	August 21	Arriving via Yeager Airport, President Trump traveled to Charleston, West Virginia where he held a roundtable with supporters and a Make America Great Again Rally at the Charleston Civic Center.	
Ohio	Columbus	August 24	Arriving via John Glenn Columbus International Airport, President Trump and First Lady Melania Trump traveled to Columbus, Ohio. While in Columbus, the pair visited Nationwide Children's Hospital before traveling to the Greater Columbus Convention Center, where the president hosted a roundtable with supporters and delivered remarks to the Ohio Republican Party State Dinner.	
Virginia	Sterling	August 25	President Trump traveled to Sterling, Virginia, to the Trump International Golf Club.	
Virginia	Sterling	August 26	President Trump traveled to Sterling, Virginia, to the Trump International Golf Club.	
Indiana	Evansville	August 30	Arriving via Evansville Regional Airport, President Trump traveled to Evansville, Indiana. While in Indiana, Trump held a roundtable with supporters at Old National Events Plaza and delivered remarks to the joint fundraising committee. Following this event, Trump traveled to the Ford Center where he held a Make America Great Again Rally and endorsed Senate candidate Mike Braun.	The Trump rally in Evansville
North Carolina	Charlotte	August 31	President Trump traveled to Charlotte, North Carolina, where he participated in a signing event, held a roundtable with supporters, and delivered remarks to a joint fundraising committee.	

== September ==
Country/ U.S. state	Areas visited	Dates	Details	Image
Virginia	Sterling	September 1	President Trump traveled to Trump National Golf Club in Sterling, Virginia.	
Virginia	Sterling	September 2	President Trump traveled to Trump National Golf Club in Sterling, Virginia.	
Montana	Billings	September 6	Arriving via Billings Logan International Airport, President Trump traveled to Montana where he attended a rally on behalf of Matt Rosendale at the Rimrock Auto Arena at MetraPark. Trump remained overnight at the DoubleTree by Hilton Hotel Billings.	
North Dakota	Fargo	September 7	Arriving via Hector International Airport, President Trump traveled to Fargo, where he attended a fundraiser at the Delta Hotel Fargo to raise money for Representative Kevin Cramer in the upcoming Senate election.	
South Dakota	Sioux Falls	September 7	Arriving via Sioux Falls Regional Airport, President Trump traveled to Sioux Falls where he attended a fundraiser dinner for gubernatorial candidate Kristi Noem at the Denny Sanford Premier Center.	
Virginia	Sterling	September 8	President Trump traveled to Trump National Golf Club in Sterling, Virginia.	
Pennsylvania	Shanksville	September 11	Arriving via John Murtha Johnstown-Cambria County Airport, President Trump and First Lady Melania Trump flew to the United Airlines Flight 93 via Marine One, and participated in a memorial service honoring the victims of United Airlines Flight 93 which crashed into a field in Somerset County on September 11, 2001. This event marked the dedication of the Tower of Voices, a new addition to the Flight 93 National Memorial.	
North Carolina	MCAS Cherry Point, Havelock, New Bern	September 19	President Trump joined North Carolina governor Roy Cooper and toured areas affected by Hurricane Florence.	
South Carolina	Conway	September 19	President Trump joined South Carolina governor Henry McMaster and toured areas affected by Hurricane Florence.	
Nevada	Las Vegas	September 20–21	President Trump traveled to Las Vegas to attend a campaign rally for Senator Dean Heller on September 20 at the Las Vegas Convention Center. Trump remained overnight at the Trump International Hotel Las Vegas, where he held a fundraiser for Dean Heller and Danny Tarkanian on September 21. He then held a round table with supporters and held a bill signing at the VA Southern Nevada Healthcare System.	
Missouri	Springfield	September 21	Arriving via Springfield-Branson National Airport, President Trump traveled to Springfield to attend a campaign rally for Josh Hawley at JQH Arena on the campus of Missouri State University.	
New Jersey	Bedminster	September 21–23	President Trump traveled to Trump National Golf Club in Bedminster, New Jersey.	
New York	New York City	September 23–27	President Trump traveled to New York City to attend the United Nations summit, arriving at Trump Tower on September 23. President Trump subsequently dined with Japanese prime minister Shinzō Abe at Trump Tower. On September 24, President Trump attended the United Nations event on 'Global Drug Problem' at the Headquarters of the United Nations. President Trump subsequently held a bilateral meeting with South Korean president Moon Jae-in at the Lotte New York Palace and signed new revisions into the ROK-US free trade agreement. President Trump then held bilateral meetings with Egyptian president Abdel Fattah el-Sisi and French president Emmanuel Macron at the Lotte New York Palace. On September 25, President Trump addressed the United Nations General Assembly at the Headquarters of the United Nations. President Trump subsequently held a bilateral meeting with Colombian president Iván Duque Márquez at the Lotte New York Palace. On September 26, President Trump held bilateral meetings with Israeli prime minister Benjamin Netanyahu, Japanese prime minister Shinzō Abe, and British prime minister Theresa May at the Lotte New York Palace. On September 27, President Trump visited the United States Mission to the United Nations.	
Virginia	Sterling	September 29	President Trump traveled to Trump National Golf Club in Sterling, Virginia.	
West Virginia	Wheeling	September 29	Arriving via Wheeling Ohio County Airport, President Trump traveled to Wheeling to attend a campaign rally for Senate candidate Patrick Morrisey at the WesBanco Arena.	

== October ==
Country/ U.S. state	Areas visited	Dates	Details	Image
Tennessee	Johnson City	October 1	Arriving via Tri-Cities Regional Airport, President Trump traveled to Johnson City to participate in a roundtable with supporters and subsequently attended a campaign rally at the Freedom Hall Civic Center for US Senate candidate Marsha Blackburn.	
Pennsylvania	Philadelphia	October 2	Arriving via Philadelphia International Airport, President Trump traveled to Philadelphia to address Electricians and Engineers at a NECA convention.	President Donald J. Trump welcomes IBEW 98 apprentice Liam Nicolette to the podium at the National Electrical Contractor Association Tuesday, October 2, 2018, at the Pennsylvania Convention Center in Philadelphia.
Mississippi	Southaven	October 2	President Trump traveled to Southaven to attend a campaign rally for Senator Cindy Hyde-Smith at the Landers Center.	
Minnesota	Minneapolis, Rochester	October 4	President Trump traveled to Minneapolis for a fundraiser, then to Rochester to attend a campaign rally for Congressman Jason Lewis, congressional candidate Jim Hagedorn, and Senate candidate Karin Housley at the Mayo Civic Center.	
Kansas	Topeka	October 6	President Trump traveled to Topeka to attend a campaign rally for Gubernatorial candidate Kris Kobach at the Kansas Expocentre.	
Virginia	Sterling	October 7	President Trump traveled to Trump National Golf Club in Sterling, Virginia.	
Florida	Orlando	October 8	President Trump addressed the International Association of Chiefs of Police and Law Enforcement Convention in Orlando, Florida. The convention was held in the Orange County Convention Center.	President Donald J. Trump addresses his remarks Monday, October 8, 2018, at the International Association of Chiefs of Police and Law Enforcement Convention at the Orange County Convention Center in Orlando, Fla.
Iowa	Council Bluffs	October 9	Arriving via the airport in Omaha, Nebraska, President Trump traveled to Council Bluffs to attend a campaign rally for Governor Kim Reynolds and Congressman David Young at the Mid-America Center.	
Pennsylvania	Erie	October 10	Arriving via Erie International Airport, President Trump traveled to Erie to attend a campaign rally for Senate candidate Lou Barletta and Congressman Mike Kelly at the Erie Insurance Arena.	
Ohio	Cincinnati, Lebanon	October 12	Arriving via Cincinnati Municipal Airport, President Trump traveled to Cincinnati for a fundraiser, then to Lebanon to attend a campaign rally for Senate candidate Jim Renacci and Congressman Steve Chabot at the Warren County Fairgrounds.	
Kentucky	Richmond	October 13	Arriving via Blue Grass Airport in Lexington, President Trump traveled to Richmond to attend a campaign rally for Congressman Andy Barr at the Alumni Coliseum on the campus of Eastern Kentucky University.	
Virginia	Sterling	October 14	President Trump traveled to Trump National Golf Club in Sterling, Virginia.	
Florida	Valparaiso, Lynn Haven	October 15	President Trump and First Lady Melania Trump visited areas affected by Hurricane Michael.	President Donald J. Trump and First Lady Melania Trump, alongside Florida Governor Rick Scott and his wife Mrs. Ann Scott, tour the Lynn Haven Community in Lynn Haven, Fla. Monday, October 15, 2018, and meet with the residents impacted by Hurricane Michael.
Georgia	Warner Robins	October 15	President Trump and First Lady Melania Trump visited areas affected by Hurricane Michael.	President Donald J. Trump and First Lady Melania Trump meet with local farmers to discuss the impact Hurricane Michael has had on their crops Monday, October 15, 2018, at Charlie Stewart's Farm in Macon, Ga.
Montana	Missoula	October 18	Arriving via Missoula International Airport, President Trump traveled to Missoula to attend a campaign rally for Senate candidate Matt Rosendale at the Missoula Montana Airport.	
Arizona	Scottsdale, Mesa	October 18–20	Arriving via Phoenix Sky Harbor International Airport, the President traveled to Scottsdale, where he stayed overnight at Fairmont Scottsdale Princess Resort. On October 19, President Trump attending a roundtable with supporters, gave remarks at the Joint Fundraiser Community Luncheon, having a signing of presidential memorandum of Water Rights in the West, he participate of Defense roundtable, subsequently traveled to Mesa to attend a campaign rally for Senate candidate Martha McSally at the International Air Response.	President Donald J. Trump poses for a photo with Brig. Gen. Todd Canterbury, Chief Master Sgt. Ronald Thompson, Col. Bryan Cook and U.S. Rep. Martha McSally, R-Ariz. after participating in a defense capability tour Friday, October 19, 2018, at Luke Air Force Base, Ariz.
Nevada	Elko	October 20	Arriving via Elko Regional Airport, President Trump traveled to Elko to attend a campaign rally for gubernatorial candidate Adam Laxalt and Senator Dean Heller at the Elko Regional Airport.	
Texas	Houston	October 22	Arriving via Ellington Field, President Trump traveled to Houston to attend a roundtable with supporters and campaign rally for Governor Greg Abbott and Senator Ted Cruz at the Toyota Center.	
Wisconsin	Mosinee	October 24	President Trump traveled to Mosinee to attend a campaign rally for Governor Scott Walker and Senate candidate Leah Vukmir at the Central Wisconsin Airport.	
North Carolina	Charlotte	October 26	Arriving via Charlotte Douglas International Airport, President Trump traveled to Charlotte to attend a campaign rally for congressional candidate Mark Harris and Congressman Ted Budd at the Bojangles' Coliseum.	
Indiana	Indianapolis	October 27	Arriving via Indianapolis International Airport, President Trump addressed the Future Farmers of America Convention at the Bankers Life Fieldhouse.	President Donald J. Trump waves to awaiting supporters Saturday, October 27, 2018, as he disembarks Air Force One at Indianapolis International Airport, to address the Future Farmers of America convention in Indianapolis.
Illinois	Murphysboro	October 27	President Trump traveled to Murphysboro to attend a campaign rally for Congressman Mike Bost at the Southern Illinois Airport.	
Pennsylvania	Pittsburgh	October 30	President Trump and First Lady Melania Trump traveled to Pittsburgh via the Pittsburgh International Airport to offer their thoughts and prayers following the synagogue shooting.	President Donald J. Trump and First Lady Melania Trump visit a memorial outside the Tree of Life Congregation Synagogue in Pittsburgh Tuesday, October 30, 2018, placing flowers and stones in remembrance of the victims of Saturday's mass shooting.
Florida	Fort Myers, Estero	October 31	Arriving via Southwest Florida International Airport, President Trump traveled to Fort Myers to attend a campaign rally for gubernatorial candidate Ron DeSantis and Senate candidate Rick Scott at the Hertz Arena.	

== November ==
Country/ U.S. state	Areas visited	Dates	Details	Image
Missouri	Columbia	November 1	President Trump traveled to Columbia to attend a campaign rally for Senate candidate Josh Hawley at the Columbia Regional Airport.	
West Virginia	Huntington	November 2	President Trump traveled to Huntington to attend a campaign rally for Senate candidate Patrick Morrisey and congressional candidate Carol Miller at the Tri-State Airport.	
Indiana	Indianapolis	November 2	Arriving via Indianapolis International Airport, President Trump traveled to Indianapolis to attend a campaign rally for Senate candidate Mike Braun at the Southport High School.	
Montana	Belgrade	November 3	President Trump traveled to Belgrade to attend a campaign rally for Senate candidate Matt Rosendale and Congressman Greg Gianforte at the Bozeman Yellowstone International Airport.	
Florida	Pensacola	November 3	President Trump traveled Pensacola to attend a campaign rally for gubernatorial candidate Ron DeSantis and Senate candidate Rick Scott at the Pensacola International Airport.	
Georgia	Macon	November 4	President Trump traveled to Macon to attend a campaign rally for gubernatorial candidate Brian Kemp at the Middle Georgia Regional Airport.	
Tennessee	Chattanooga	November 4	Arriving via Chattanooga Metropolitan Airport, President Trump traveled to Chattanooga to attend a campaign rally for Senate candidate Marsha Blackburn at the McKenzie Arena.	
Ohio	Cleveland	November 5	Arriving via Cleveland Hopkins International Airport, President Trump traveled to Cleveland to attend a campaign rally for Senate candidate Jim Renacci and gubernatorial candidate Mike DeWine at the I-X Center.	
Indiana	Fort Wayne	November 5	Arriving via Fort Wayne International Airport, President Trump traveled to Fort Wayne to attend a campaign rally for Senate candidate Mike Braun at the Allen County War Memorial Coliseum.	
Missouri	Cape Girardeau	November 5	Arriving via Cape Girardeau Regional Airport, President Trump traveled to Cape Girardeau to attend a campaign rally for Senate candidate Josh Hawley with special guests Sean Hannity, Rush Limbaugh and Lee Greenwood at the Show Me Center.	
France	Paris	November 9–11	President Trump and First Lady Melania Trump traveled to Paris, arriving via Orly Airport on November 9. President Trump held a bilateral meeting with President Emmanuel Macron at Élysée Palace on November 10. On November 11, President Trump participated in the Armistice Day celebrations marking the 100th anniversary of the Armistice with Germany that brought major hostilities of World War I to an end. President Trump visited the Suresnes American Cemetery and Memorial.	
California	Chico, Paradise, Malibu	November 17	President Trump traveled to California to visit the affected areas of California Wildfire.	
Florida	Mar-a-Lago, Palm Beach	November 20–25	Arriving via Palm Beach International Airport, President Trump traveled to West Palm Beach for the Thanksgiving Holiday. On November 21, Trump visited Trump International Golf Club to play a round of golf with Jack Nicklaus, Gary Nicklaus and GT Nicklaus. On November 22, Trump visited the Coast Guard Station Lake Worth Inlet. On November 22–25, Trump traveled to the Trump International Golf Club in West Palm Beach.	
Mississippi	Tupelo, Gulfport, Biloxi	November 26	President Trump traveled to Tupelo and Biloxi to attend two separate campaign rallies for Senator Cindy Hyde-Smith for upcoming Mississippi Special Election Runoff at the Tupelo Regional Airport and Mississippi Coast Coliseum. President Trump traveled to Gulfport for roundtable on the FIRST STEP Act.	
Argentina	Buenos Aires	November 29 – December 1	President Trump and First Lady Melania Trump arrived in Ministro Pistarini International Airport on November 29, to attend the G20 summit. On November 30, President Trump held a bilateral meeting with President Mauricio Macri at Casa Rosada. President Trump signs the deal of USMCA along with Canadian prime minister Justin Trudeau and outgoing Mexican president Enrique Peña Nieto. President Trump also held bilateral meetings with Australian prime minister Scott Morrison, Indian prime minister Narendra Modi, Japanese prime minister Shinzō Abe and South Korean president Moon Jae-in. On December 1, President Trump held bilateral meetings with German chancellor Angela Merkel and Turkish president Recep Tayyip Erdoğan. President Trump also held a bilateral meeting and dinner with Chinese president Xi Jinping to discuss trade relations between the two countries.	

== December ==
Country/ U.S. state	Areas visited	Dates	Details	Image
Missouri	Kansas City	December 7	Arriving via Kansas City International Airport, President Trump addressed the Project Safe Neighborhoods National Conference at The Westin Kansas City at Crown Center.	
Pennsylvania	Philadelphia	December 8	Arriving via Philadelphia International Airport, President Trump attended the 119th Army–Navy Game to handle coin toss at the Lincoln Financial Field.	
Virginia	Arlington	December 15	President Trump visited Arlington National Cemetery to pay honor for Wreaths Across America Day.	
Iraq	Al Asad Air Base	December 26	President Trump and First Lady Melania Trump made an unannounced Christmas visit to meet with American troops at Al Asad Air Base in Iraq.	
Germany	Ramstein Air Base	December 27	President Trump and First Lady Melania Trump visited American troops at Ramstein Air Base in Germany on their way back from Iraq.	

== See also ==
- List of international presidential trips made by Donald Trump
- List of Donald Trump rallies (December 2016–2022)
- Lists of presidential trips made by Donald Trump
