= List of military installations in Texas =

This is a list of military installations in Texas, in the United States.

List of military installations in Texas
| Installation name | Location | Notes |
|---|---|---|
| Kelly Field / Joint Base San Antonio | San Antonio | formerly Kelly Air Force Base |
| Ellington Field Joint Reserve Base | Houston | |
| Lackland Air Force Base | San Antonio | |
| Randolph Air Force Base | San Antonio | |
| Fort Sam Houston | San Antonio | |
| Camp Bullis | San Antonio | |
| Martindale Army Air Field | San Antonio | |
| Dyess Air Force Base | Abilene | |
| Goodfellow Air Force Base | San Angelo | |
| Laughlin Air Force Base | Del Rio | |
| Sheppard Air Force Base | Wichita Falls | |
| Fort Hood | Killeen | |
| Fort Bliss | El Paso | |
| Fort Wolters | Mineral Wells | |
| Naval Air Station Corpus Christi | Corpus Christi | |
| Naval Air Station Kingsville | Kingsville | |
| Naval Air Station Joint Reserve Base Fort Worth | Fort Worth | Carswell AFB |
| Grand Prairie Armed Forces Reserve Complex | Grand Prairie | |
| Hensley Field | Grand Prairie | |
| Camp Mabry | Austin | |
| Camp Swift | Bastrop | |
| Camp Bowie | Brownwood | |
| Coast Guard Air Station Corpus Christi | Corpus Christi | |
| Coast Guard Air Station Houston | Houston | |
| Coast Guard Sector Field Office Galveston | Galveston | |
| Coast Guard Station Aransas | Port Aransas | |
| Coast Guard Station Freeport | Surfside Beach | |
| Coast Guard Station Port O'Connor | Port O'Connor | |
| Coast Guard Station Sabine Pass | Port Arthur | |
| Coast Guard Station Saluria | Matagorda Island | |
| Coast Guard Station San Luis Pass | Galveston | |
| Coast Guard Station South Padre Island | South Padre Island | |
| Coast Guard Station Velasco | Velasco | |

== See also ==
- List of United States military bases
