= 147 Squadron =

147 Squadron may refer to:

- 147 Squadron (Israel)
- No. 147 Squadron RCAF, Canada
- No. 147 Squadron RAF, United Kingdom
- 147th Aero Squadron, United States Army Air Service
- 147th Air Refueling Squadron, United States Air Force
- 147th Air Support Operations Squadron, United States Air Force
- 147th Combat Communications Squadron, United States Air Force
- VFA-147, United States Navy
