= 147th Air Support Operations Squadron =

- Active: 2009-present
- Country: United States
- Allegiance: Texas
- Branch: Air National Guard
- Role: Close Air Support
- Part of: 147th Reconnaissance Wing; Texas Air National Guard; Air Combat Command
- Garrison/HQ: Ellington Field Joint Reserve Base, Houston, Texas
- Motto(s): "Prepare To Be Punished"

Commanders
- Current commander: Lt Col Steven Kroll

Insignia
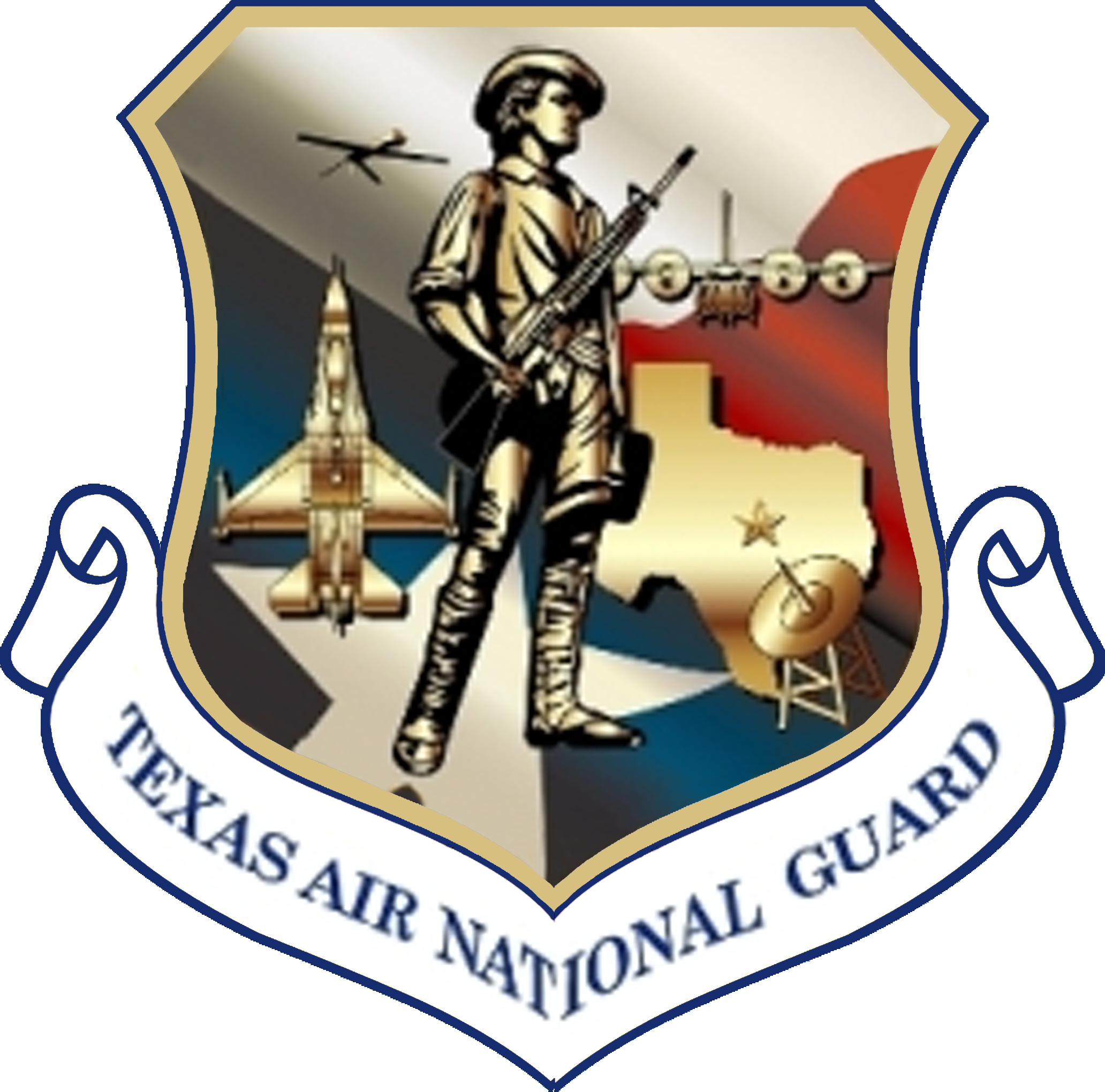
- Emblem of the Texas Air National Guard

The United States Air Force's 147th Air Support Operations Squadron is a combat support unit located at Ellington Field Joint Reserve Base, Houston, Texas. The 147th provides tactical command and control of air power assets to the Joint Forces Air Component Commander and Joint Forces Land Component Commander for combat operations.

== State Partnership Program ==
The SPP evolved from a 1991 U.S. European Command decision to set up the Joint Contact Team Program in the Baltic Region with Reserve component Soldiers and Airmen. A subsequent National Guard Bureau proposal paired U.S. states with three nations emerging from the former Soviet Bloc and the SPP was born, becoming a key U.S. security cooperation tool, facilitating cooperation across all aspects of international civil-military affairs and encouraging people-to-people ties at the state level."

Texas Partnerships, Czech Republic 1993-present, Chile 2008-present
