= 147th Attack Wing =

United States Air Force Air Combat Command unit

147th Attack Wing

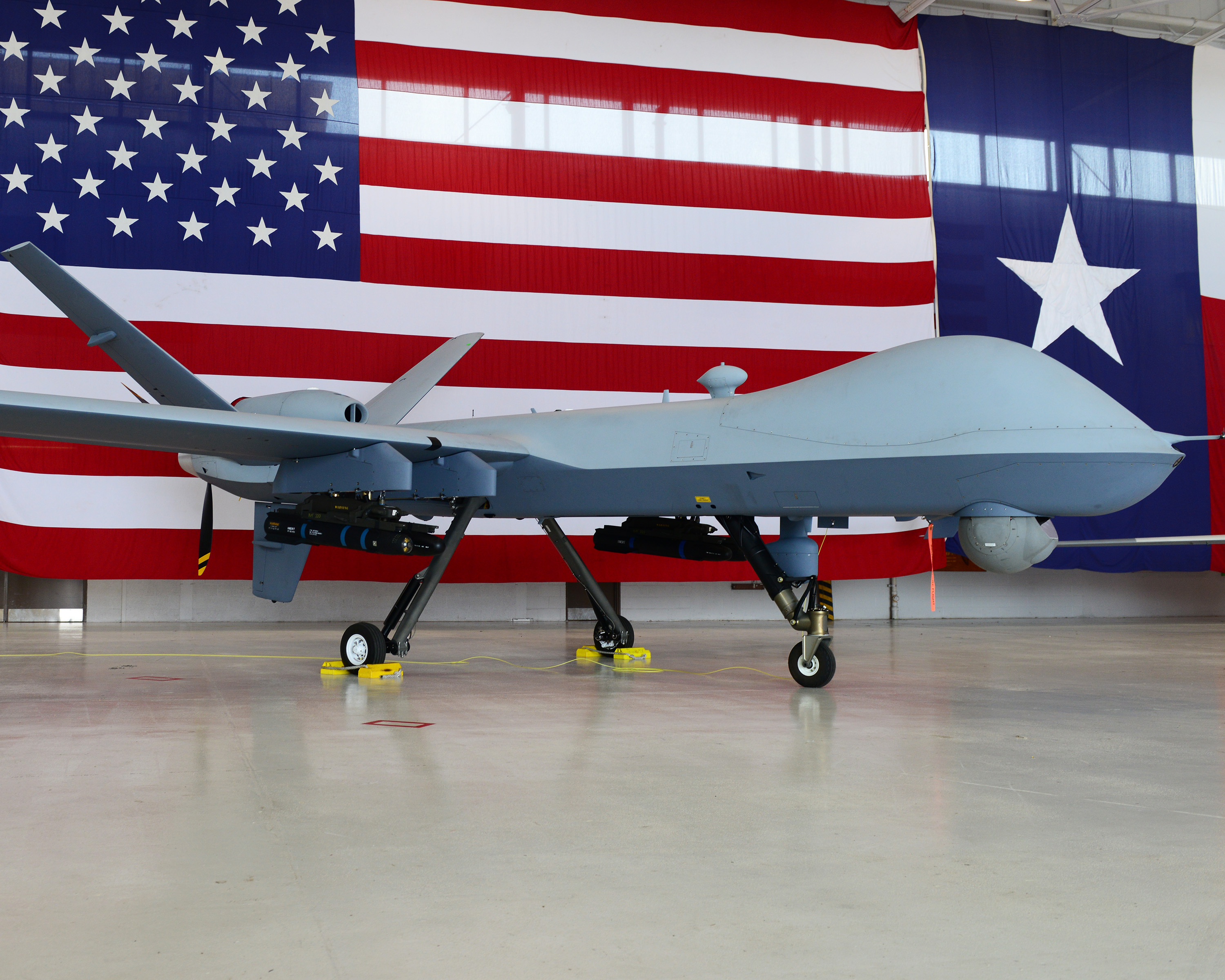
- 147th Attack Wing MQ-9 Reaper Spirit of Houston
- Active: 1957–present
- Country: United States
- Allegiance: Texas
- Branch: Air National Guard
- Type: Wing
- Role: ISTAR
- Part of: Texas Air National Guard
- Garrison/HQ: Ellington Field Joint Reserve Base, Texas
- Decorations: Air Force Outstanding Unit Award

Commanders
- 147 ATKW Commander: Colonel Travis Walters
- 147 ATKW Command Chief: Command Chief Master Sergeant Trang "Rose" Maxie

Insignia
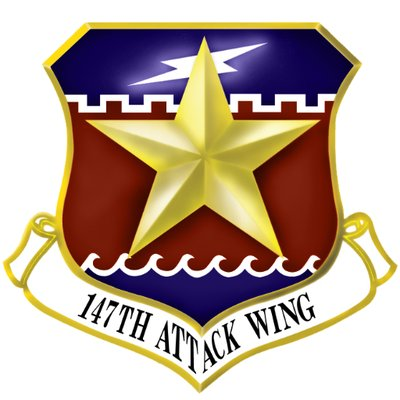
- 147th Attack Wing emblem

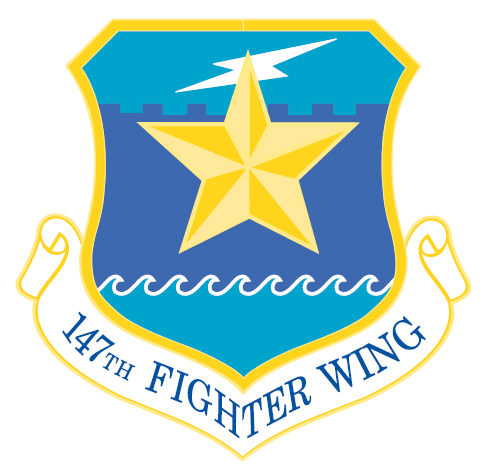
- 147th Fighter Wing emblem
- Tail stripe: Blue stripe with white star "TEXAS"
- Tail code: TX

Aircraft flown
- Attack: MQ-9 Reaper
- Reconnaissance: RC-26B

The 147th Attack Wing is a unit of the Texas Air National Guard, stationed at Ellington Field Joint Reserve Base, Houston, Texas. The Wing would be transferred to the United States Air Force Air Combat Command if brought into federal service.

The 111th Attack Squadron, assigned to the wing's 147th Operations Group, is a descendant organization of the World War I 111th Air Squadron, established on 14 August 1917. It was reformed on 29 June 1923, as the 111th Observation Squadron, and is one of the 29 original National Guard Observation Squadrons of the United States Army National Guard that were formed before World War II.

== Mission ==
The 147th Attack Wing, based at Ellington Field in Houston, Texas, flies combat support missions 24/7 via advanced satellite communications, providing surveillance, reconnaissance, and air support for US and Allied forces. In conducting combat support sorties, the 147th Attack Wing provides leadership at all levels with critical real-time Intelligence, Surveillance, and Reconnaissance (ISR) air-to-ground munitions, and strike capability. A collocated Air Support Operations Squadron provides terminal control for weapons employment in a close air support scenario integrating combat air and ground operations.

== Units ==
The 147th Attack Wing consists of the following units:

- 147th Operations Group

111th Attack Squadron
111th Weather Flight
147th Operations Support Squadron
147th Operations Group Detachment One
147th Air Support Operations Squadron

- 147th Maintenance Group

147th Aircraft Maintenance Squadron
147th Maintenance Operations Flight
147th Munitions Flight

- 147th Mission Support Group

147th Civil Engineer Squadron
147th Communications Flight
147th Force Support Squadron
147th Logistics Readiness Squadron
147th Security Forces Squadron

- 147th Medical Group

== History ==
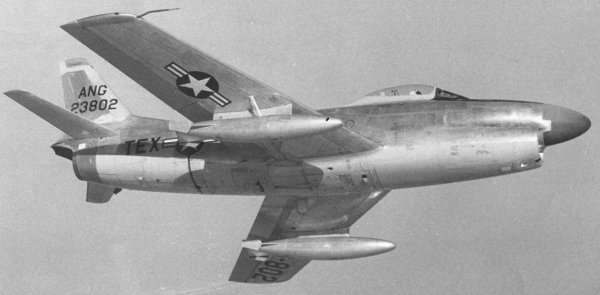
F-86D Sabre of the Texas Air National Guard.

In 1957, the Texas Air National Guard 111th Fighter-Interceptor Squadron, stationed at Ellington Air Force Base near Houston, was authorized to expand to a group level under the 136th Air Defense Wing. On 1 July 1957, the National Guard Bureau extended federal recognition to the 147th Fighter Group (Air Defense). The 111th was reassigned from the 136th Fighter-Interceptor Group to the 147th, becoming the new group's flying squadron. Support squadrons of the 147th were the group headquarters, 147th Material Squadron (maintenance and supply), 147th Combat Support Squadron, and the 147th USAF Dispensary.

=== Air Defense ===
Initially equipped with the North American F-86D Sabre, in June 1959 the squadron traded their F-86Ds for the upgraded F-86L Sabre. In August 1960, the unit became one of the first to transition to the Convair F-102A Delta Dagger Mach 2 all-weather interceptor, and began a 24-hour alert to guard the Texas Gulf coast.

In August 1961, as part of an Air Defense Command reorganization, the group's assignment to 136th Air Defense Wing was terminated with 136th being transferred to Tactical Air Command. The 147th was directly assigned to the Texas Air National Guard, being operationally gained by the Air Defense Command 33rd Air Division.

On 1 January 1970, the squadron was redesignated the 111th Combat Crew Training Squadron and served as the Air National Guard's RTU (Replacement Training Unit) for the TF/F-102A, In 1971, when the active-duty force ceased F-102A training and closed Perrin Air Force Base, Texas on 30 June 1971, the Houston-based 111th FIS became the RTU for all Air Defense Command F-102 pilots, and the squadron received several TF-102A dual-seat trainers which were transferred from Perrin while also retaining the T-33A instrument training function.

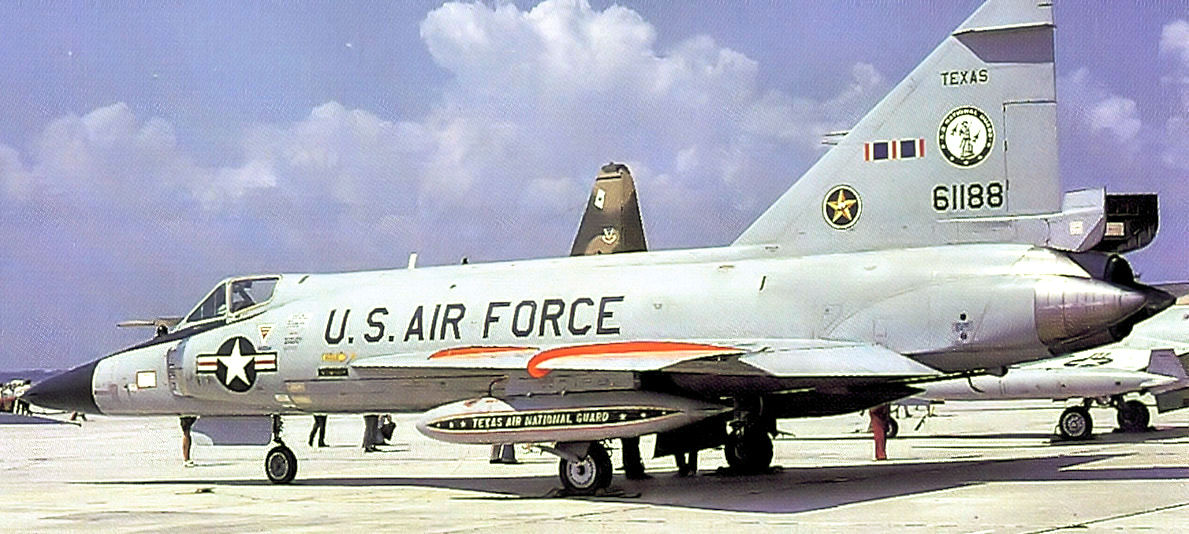
111th Fighter Interceptor Squadron Convair F-102A-65-CO Delta Dagger 56–1188.

One pilot who flew TF/F-102As with the 111th was 1st Lt. George W. Bush, a future Governor of Texas and President of the United States. George W. Bush's military service began in 1968 when he enlisted in the Texas Air National Guard after graduating with a bachelor's degree in history from Yale University. After being accepted into the air national guard, Airman Basic Bush was selected to attend pilot training. His six weeks of basic training was completed at Lackland Air Force Base, Texas during July and August 1968. Upon its completion, Bush was promoted to the officer's rank of second lieutenant required for pilot candidates. He spent the next year in flight school at Moody Air Force Base, Georgia from November 1968 to November 1969. Bush then returned to Ellington Air Force Base, Texas to complete seven months of combat crew training on the F-102 from December 1969 to June 1970. This period included five weeks of training on the Lockheed T-33 T-Bird and 16 weeks aboard the TF-102 Delta Dagger two-seat trainer and finally the single-seat F-102A. Bush graduated from the training program in June 1970. Lt. Bush remained in the Texas ANG as a certified F-102 pilot who participated in frequent drills and alerts through April 1972. Lt. Bush was honorably discharged from the Air National Guard in October 1973 at the rank of First Lieutenant. An ANG physical dated 15 May 1971 indicates that he had logged 625 flight hours by that time, and he ultimately completed 326 hours as pilot and 10 as co-pilot while serving with the 111th Fighter-Interceptor Squadron.

In May 1971, the 111th added F-101B/F Voodoos and became the RTU for the twin seat F-101F type, while continuing as the F-102 Delta Dagger RTU. In January 1975, after 14 years of service, the unit's F-102s were retired, but the unit maintained a full fleet of F-101s.

The 111th also operated Detachment 1, 147th Fighter Group at New Orleans. The detachment was apart from the squadron in that it maintained constant alert status whilst facing towards Cuba.

In October 1979, in as part of the inactivation of Aerospace Defense Command, the USAF gained command responsibilities which shifted to Tactical Air Command (TAC) and a sub-organization equivalent to a numbered air force designated as Air Defense, Tactical Air Command (ADTAC). In 1982, the F-101s were retired and ADTAC re-equipped the 111th with the McDonnell F-4C Phantom II and continued its air defense mission. Most of the F-4Cs the squadron received were Vietnam War veteran aircraft. In November 1986, the F-4Cs were replaced by later-model F-4Ds.

In December 1989 the 111th FIS started receiving block 15 F-16A/B Fighting Falcon aircraft to replace their F-4Ds. The last F-16 arrived in April 1990.

In 1992, only a few years following the acceptance of their block 15s, they converted to the Air Defense Fighter (ADF) variant of the block 15. On 15 March 1992 the 111th FIS was redesignated the 111th Fighter Squadron when its parent 147th Fighter Group converted to the USAF Objective Organization plan. Also in 1992 the 111th FS celebrated their 75th anniversary. To commemorate this F-16A ADF #82-1001 was painted in special markings including a big Texas flag painted on the fuselage underside. During September 1995, the 111th FS ended its alert detachment in New Orleans with the F-101 Voodoo, also the 147th was upgraded to a Wing, with the 111th Fighter Squadron being assigned to the new 147th Operations Group.

=== Tactical Fighter mission ===
In late 1996 the 111th started to retire their ADF F-16s to Aerospace Maintenance and Regeneration Center (AMARC). To replace these aircraft the squadron received the block 25 F-16C/D Fighting Falcon. Transition started in September 1996 and was completed by February 1997. This brought a change in role which officially happened in October 1998. The role went from air-to-air to an air-to-ground mission. After returning from an Operation Southern Watch mission at Prince Sultan Air Base, Saudi Arabia in October 2000, the squadron added Precision Guided Munitions to its arsenal.

=== Global war on terrorism ===
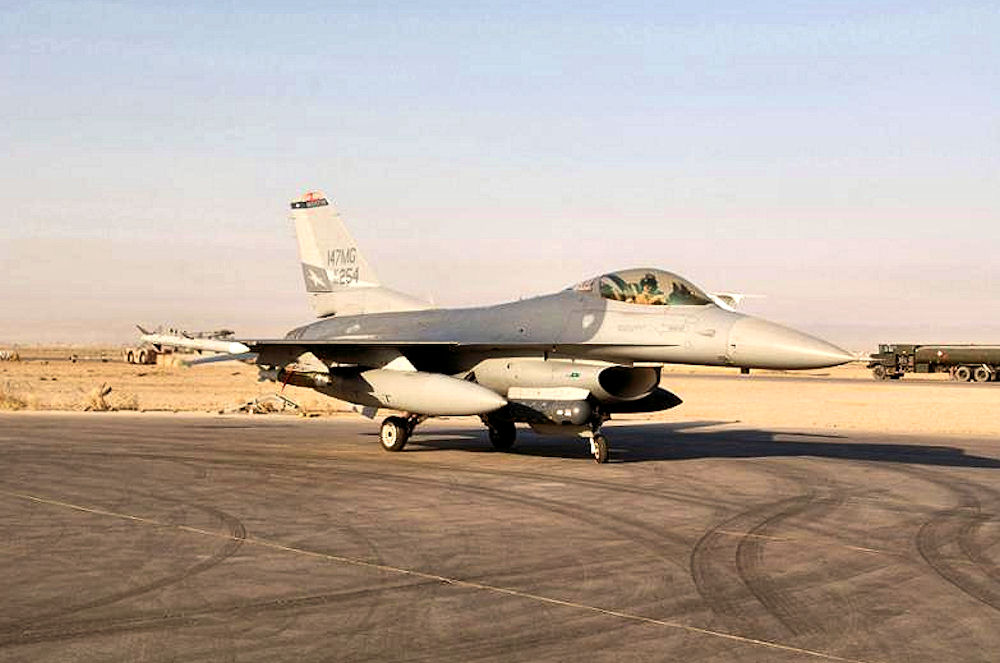
F-16C Fighting Falcon of the 111th Expeditionary Fighter Squadron at Balad Air Base (Note: This aircraft is General Dynamics F-16C Block 25E Fighting Falcon, serial; 84–1309. This photo shows it taxiing following its mission on 4 September 2005 when it reached the 6,000 flying-hour mark.)

Following the 11 September 2001 terrorist attacks, four 111th Fighter Squadron aircraft were launched to escort President George W. Bush, onboard Air Force One from Florida to Louisiana, Nebraska and back to Washington DC that same day. December 2001 saw the 111th deploy to Atlantic City, New Jersey, to fly Air Defense Combat Air Patrol missions over New York, Philadelphia and Washington DC in support of Operation Noble Eagle.

In August 2005 components of the 111th Fighter Squadron and 147th Fighter Wing deployed to Balad Airbase, Iraq to conduct combat operations in support of Operation Iraqi Freedom and the Global War on Terrorism. The 111th FS/147th FW flew 462 sorties and almost 1,900 hours in a two-month span; with a perfect record of 100% maintenance delivery (zero missed sorties), 100% mission effectiveness, and 100% weapons employment/hits under challenging combat conditions.

In April 2007, components of the 111th Fighter Squadron and 147th Fighter Wing again deployed to Balad Airbase, Iraq for the Iraq War. On this deployment, the 111th Fighter Squadron flew 348 tasked sorties, plus six no-notice Close Air Support (CAS) alert scrambles and four short-notice (less than 30 minutes & not on the Air Tasking Order (Note: An 'Air Tasking Order' is a military order used to task and disseminate to components, subordinate units, and command and control agencies projected sorties/capabilities/forces to targets and specific missions. It normally provides specific instructions to include call signs, targets, controlling agencies, etc., as well as general instructions.)). pre-planned alert launches. With an average combat sortie lasting almost 4.42 hours, the unit accumulated a total of 1537.1 combat hours. Maintenance delivery effectiveness for this deployment was 102% due to the inclusion of the unscheduled CAS scrambles. Mission effectiveness and weapons employment were both once again a perfect 100%.

=== BRAC 2005 reorganization ===
During the 2005 Base Realignment and Closure Commission, it was recommended that the F-16 Block 25s be retired. Texas Governor, Rick Perry, reacted quickly and ensured that the unit could remain alive by securing MQ-1 Predator operations. The MQ-1, an unmanned aircraft, although not exactly what the 111th had hoped for, would keep the unit going well into the future. This view that Remotely Piloted Aircraft and those who operate them are inferior is one held by most Air National Guard units who have accepted MQ-9 assignments in lieu of being completely shut down.

As was earlier planned in 2005, the 111th gave up its last two F-16s on 7 June 2008 and F-16 operations drew to a close. The MQ-1 replaced the F-16 and the parent wing was renamed the 147th Reconnaissance Wing that same month.

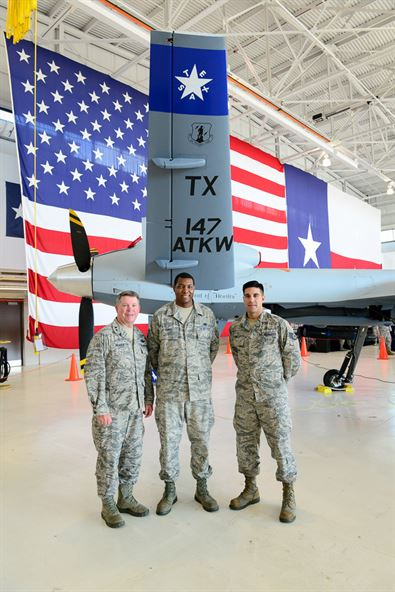
147th Attack Wing MQ-9

The 111th RS received its first MQ-9 Reaper on 28 July 2017, and the parent wing was renamed 147th Attack Wing shortly thereafter.

== Lineage ==
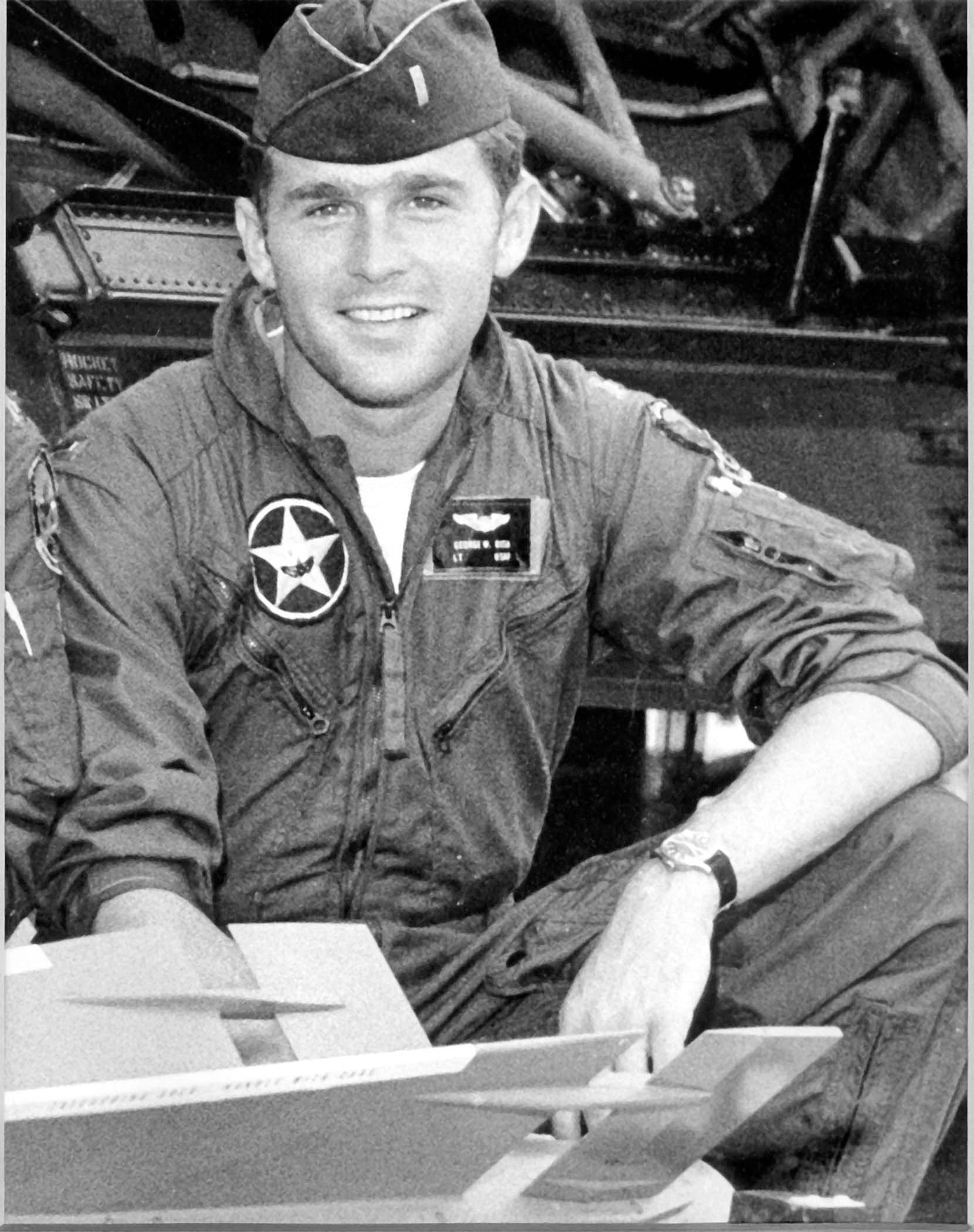
Future Governor of Texas and future President of the United States 1Lt. George W. Bush, as a member of the 111th Combat Crew Training Squadron, 1970.

- Established as the 147th Fighter Group (Air Defense) and allotted to the Air National Guard, 1957

Activated and extended federal recognition on 17 May 1958
Redesignated 147th Fighter Group on 10 March 1992
Redesignated 147th Fighter Wing on 1 October 1995
Redesignated 147th Reconnaissance Wing c. 30 June 2008
Redesignated 147th Attack Wing, April 2017

=== Assignments ===
- 136th Air Defense Wing, 17 May 1958
- Texas Air National Guard, 1 September 1961

Gained by 33rd Air Division, Air Defense Command
Gained by Oklahoma City Air Defense Sector, Air Defense Command, 25 June 1963
Gained by 31st Air Division, Air Defense Command, 1 April 1966
Gained by Fourteenth Air Force, Aerospace Defense Command, 31 December 1969
Gained by 20th Air Division, Aerospace Defense Command, 1 July 1973
Gained by Air Defense, Tactical Air Command, 1 October 1979
Gained by Southeast Air Defense Sector, First Air Force, 1 July 1987
Gained by Air Combat Command, 1 October 1996–present

=== Components ===
- 147th Operations Group, 1 October 1995 – present
- 111th Fighter-Interceptor (later 111th Fighter Squadron), 17 May 1958 – 1 October 1995

=== Stations ===
- Ellington Air Force Base (later Ellington Air National Guard Base), Texas, 17 May 1958

Designated: Ellington Field Joint Reserve Base, Houston, Texas, 1991–present

=== Aircraft ===
- F-86D Sabre, 1958–1959
- F-86L Sabre, 1959–1960
- TF/F-102A Delta Dagger, 1960–1975
- F-101B/F Voodoo, 1971–1982
- RF-4C Phantom II, 1974
- F-4C Phantom II, 1982–1987
- F-4D Phantom II, 1987–1989
- Block 15 F-16A/B Fighting Falcon, 1989–1996
- Block 25 F-16C/D Fighting Falcon, 1996–2008
- MQ-1B Predator, 2008–2017
- MQ-9 Reaper, 2017–present
