= Ellington Field Joint Reserve Base =

Installation of several military units

- Houston, Texas in the United States of America
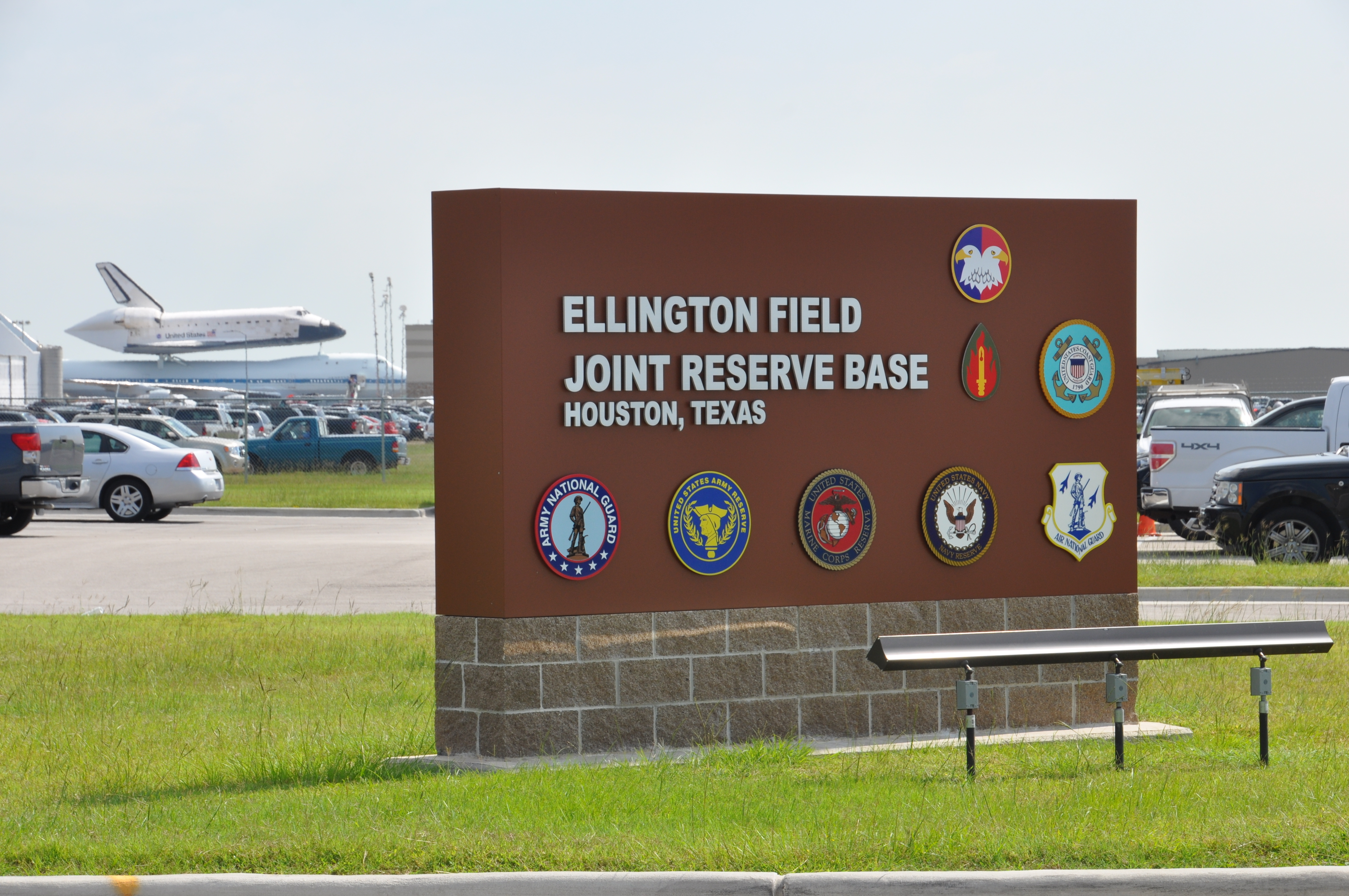
- The entrance to Ellington Field Joint Reserve Base in 2012, with the Space Shuttle Endeavour arriving in the background

Site information
- Type: Joint Reserve Base
- Owner: Department of Defense
- Operator: US Air Force (USAF)
- Controlled by: Texas Air National Guard
- Condition: Operational
- Website: Official website

Location
- Coordinates: 29°36′26″N 095°09′32″W

Site history
- Built: 1917; 109 years ago (as Ellington Field)
- In use: 1917 – present

Garrison information
- Garrison: 147th Attack Wing (TX Air National Guard); 75th Innovation Command (Army); Reserve Center Houston (Navy); 1st Battalion, 23rd Marines; Coast Guard Air Station Houston

Airfield information
- Identifiers: IATA: EFD, ICAO: KEFD, FAA LID: EFD, WMO: 722436
- Elevation: 10 metres (33 ft) AMSL
Runways
Direction	Length and surface
17R/35L	2,743.5 metres (9,001 ft) Concrete
4/22	2,438.7 metres (8,001 ft) Concrete
17L/35R	1,404.8 metres (4,609 ft) Concrete
- Airfield shared with Ellington Airport; Source: Federal Aviation Administration

Ellington Field Joint Reserve Base is a joint installation shared by various active component and reserve component military units, as well as aircraft flight operations of the National Aeronautics and Space Administration (NASA) under the aegis of the nearby Johnson Space Center. The host wing for the installation is the Texas Air National Guard's 147th Attack Wing (147 ATKW). Opened in 1917, Ellington Field was one of thirty-two Air Service training camps established after the United States entry into World War I. It is named for First Lieutenant Eric Ellington, a U.S. Army aviator who was killed in a plane crash in San Diego, California in 1913.

== Overview ==
The United States Air Force's 147th Attack Wing (147 ATKW) is an Air National Guard (ANG) unit operationally-gained by the Air Combat Command (ACC). The 147 ATKW provides a 24/7 capability with MQ-9 Reaper Unmanned Aerial Systems. In its conduct of combat support sorties, the 147 ATKW provides theater and national-level leadership with critical real-time Intelligence, Surveillance, and Reconnaissance (ISR) and Air-to-Ground Munitions and strike capability. A collocated Air Support Operations Squadron (ASOS) provides terminal control for weapons employment in a Close Air Support (CAS) scenario, integrating combat air and ground operations.

New construction designated under the "Grow the Army" project was completed in 2010. The project consisted of ten buildings for the Army National Guard and reserve units, including a battle command training center complete with state-of-the-art computerized equipment. "This will be a tremendous cost benefit to the Army Reserve as travel and logistical costs will be streamlined," noted Major General Eldon Regua, 75th division commander.

The $80 million construction project includes a 40,000-square-foot (3,700 m^{2}) Battle Command Training Center, which simulates war conditions in Iraq and Afghanistan., a second Armed Forces Reserve Center with an assembly hall and offices, a Welcome Center, which will handle retention, recruitment and military identification services. The military ID center is expected to bring thousands of retired and active military annually to Greater Houston to renew or pick up IDs, Navy, Marine Corps and Army Reserve maintenance and storage facilities, a security checkpoint and the relocation of Coast Guard Sector Houston/Galveston from Galena Park to a new $20 million facility scheduled to be completed in 2013.

Ellington now has five of the six military branches of the U.S. Department of Defense – Army, Navy and Marine Reserve units, Army and Air National Guard – in addition to the Coast Guard under the Department of Homeland Security, and NASA operations – on one base. The JRB is also the home base of a Civil Air Patrol composite squadron that routinely flies missions out of the Airport.

== History ==
=== World War I ===
In 1917, the U.S. government purchased 1,280 acres (5.2 km^{2}) of land from Dr. R. W. Knox and the Wright Land Company to establish an airbase in Houston. The location, near Genoa Township in southeast Houston, was selected because the weather conditions were ideal for flight training. Soldiers from nearby Camp Logan briefly assisted with the construction of the airfield when civilian workers went on strike. Soon after construction began on the airfield, the base was named after Eric Ellington, an Army pilot killed four years earlier in a plane crash in San Diego.

The base, which consisted of a few hangars and some wooden headquarters buildings, was completed in a matter of months. By the end of 1917, the field was ready to receive its first squadron – the 120th Aero Squadron, which was transferred from Kelly Field in San Antonio, Texas, along with its Curtiss JN4 Jenny biplanes, which were shipped in wooden crates via railroad. In December, the first planes from Ellington Field flew over Houston for a benefit for the American Red Cross. A flight of ten JN-4s took off from grass runways and followed the interurban tracks stretching north from Genoa to Houston. Throngs of men, women, and children watched in amazement as the JN-4s flew overhead. The roar of the aircraft was almost drowned out by the wail of sirens and factory whistles as the planes passed over. As the planes circled the city, they dropped paper flyers for the American Red Cross. Next, the formation flew to Camp Logan and then turned south toward Galveston Island. The entire flight took about an hour.

During World War I, Ellington served as an advanced flight training base. As of 1918, Ellington had its own gunnery and bombing range on a small peninsula in the Gulf of Mexico near San Leon, Texas. Training units assigned to Ellington Field were:

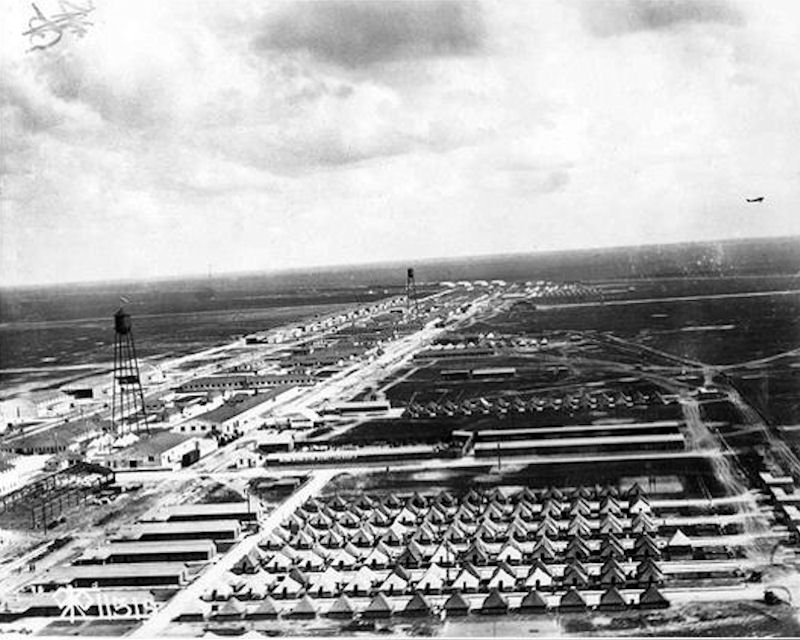
Ellington Field in 1918

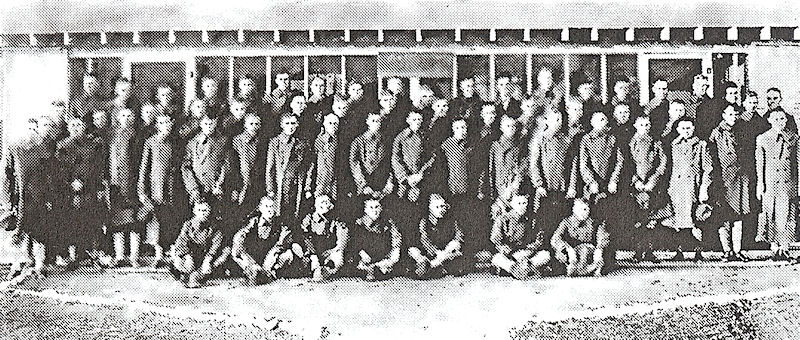
232d Aero Squadron (later Squadron "D"), Ellington Field

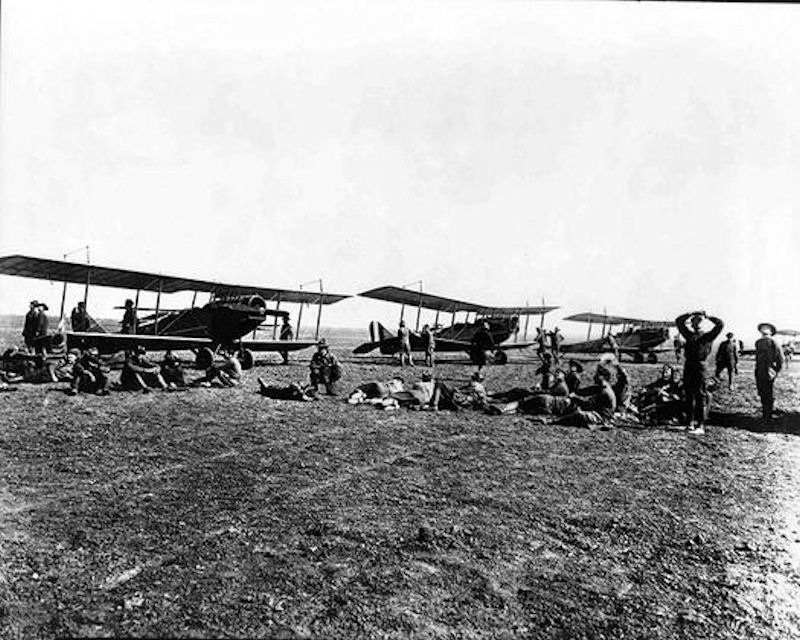
Curtiss JN-4 Jennys at Ellington Field

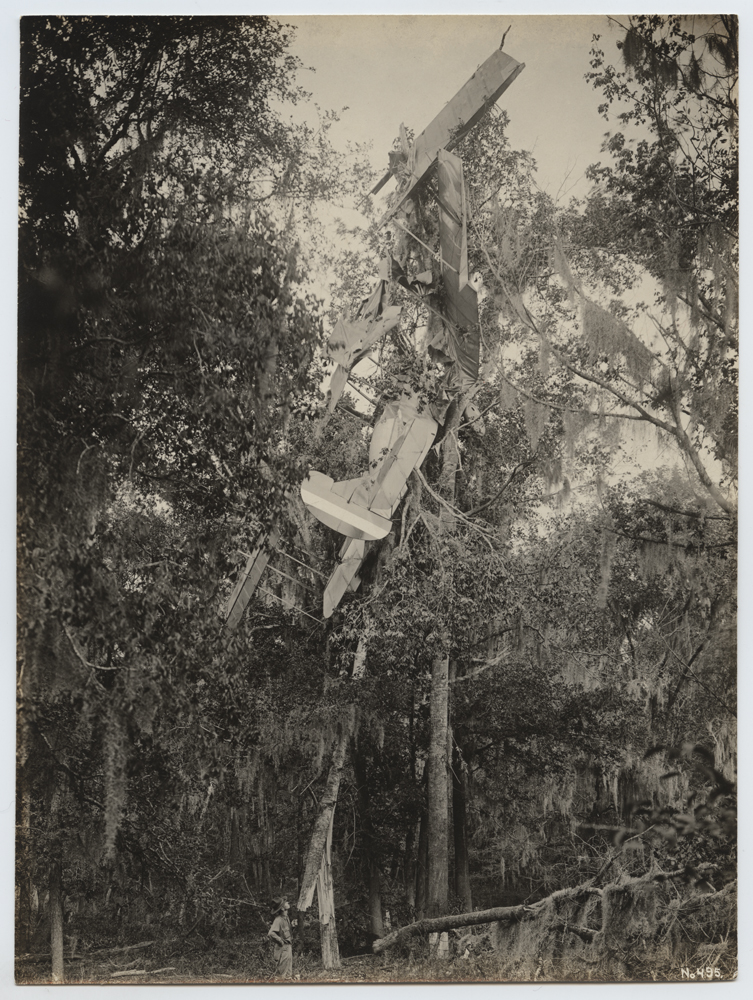
This plane piloted by Louis H. Gertson (1887–1942) experienced an engine failure and he was forced to land during training at the Second Provisional Wing of the Air Service in Park Place, Texas. Source: Overseas Dreams, 1919, Press of Gulfport Printing, Houston, TX, pp. 112–113.

- Post Headquarters, Ellington Field, November 1917 – January 1920
- 120th Aero Squadron (Service), November 1917 – February 1918 (Deployed to: American Expeditionary Forces, France)
- 69th Aero Squadron, February 1918

Redesignated as Squadron "A", July–November 1918

- 70th Aero Squadron, March 1918

Redesignated as Squadron "B", July–November 1918

- 113th Aero Squadron, March 1918 (Note: This squadron is not related to the 113th Aero Squadron, currently active as the 113th Air Support Operations Squadron.)

Redesignated as Squadron "C", July–November 1918

- 232d Aero Squadron, April 1918

Redesignated as Squadron "D", July–November 1918

- 233d Aero Squadron, April 1918

Redesignated as Squadron "E", July–November 1918

- 250th Aero Squadron, November 1917

Redesignated as Squadron "F", July–November 1918

- 272d Aero Squadron, April 1918

Redesignated as Squadron "G", July–November 1918

- 285th Aero Squadron, March 1918

Redesignated as Squadron "H", July–November 1918

- 286th Aero Squadron, March 1918

Redesignated as Squadron "I", July–November 1918

- 303d Aero Squadron (Service), June 1918

Redesignated as Squadron "K", July–November 1918

- Squadron "L", August–December 1918
- Squadron "M", September–December 1918
- Squadron "N", November–December 1918
- 850th Aero Squadron,

Redesignated as Squadron "O",

- Squadron "X", September–December 1918
- Squadron "Y", September–December 1918
- Squadron "Z", September–December 1918
- Flying School Detachment (Consolidation of Squadrons A-Z), November 1918 – September 1919

For the first months of operation, Ellington Field had no pilot fatalities. Within the year, however, this record changed for the worse. By August 1918, Ellington Field recorded the most pilot fatalities of the 18 U.S. Army Air Service training bases in the United States. Ellington became well known in military circles, and had a series of "firsts", including the first camp newspaper, the first American aerial gunnery and bombing range, the first "canteen girls", and the first aerial ambulance in American military history. Before the end of the war, approximately 5,000 men and 250 aircraft were assigned to the base.

Ellington was considered surplus to requirements after World War I and the base was inactivated as an active duty airfield in January 1920. A small caretaker unit was kept at the airfield for administrative reasons, but generally, the only flight activity during this time was from Army pilots stationed at Kelly Field who flew down to practice landings on Ellington's runways.

=== Inter-war years ===
In May 1923, the War Department had ordered the small caretaker force at Ellington Field to dismantle all remaining structures and to sell them as surplus. Orders to abandon Ellington Field were abruptly halted, however, when the War Department authorized the Texas National Guard to establish an aviation squadron. General John A. Hulen, commander of the U.S. 36th Division, announced the formation of the 111th Observation Squadron. General Hulen assured the citizens of Houston that the new air squadron was not a daredevil outfit. Hulen believed that the reactivation of Ellington Field as a reserve base would provide Houston an airfield and rekindle public interest in military aviation. With the news of the formation of the Air Squadron, one Houston Chronicle reporter christened the 111th Observation Squadron "Houston's Own," thus beginning a long relationship between Houston and the National Guard. The squadron, which flew Curtiss JN-6Hs and Dayton-Wright DH-4s, provided mapping, photography, and reconnaissance support for the 36th Infantry Division.

Though the 111th Observation Squadron had the excess World War I storage and maintenance facilities at Ellington Field, the squadron did not have a true headquarters building. Major Law requested funds from Texas and the U.S. National Guard, but unfortunately monies were not available for new buildings. Law, however, was able convince several local Houston businessmen to donate space in a downtown office building. In 1924, the 111th Observation Squadron headquarters was relocated to the Gas Company Building in downtown Houston. The use of downtown civilian facilities, however, highlighted the two major inadequacies of Ellington Field: deteriorating facilities and the great distance of the field from Houston.

In 1925 General William Mitchell conducted a "flying tour" of all National Guard Observation Squadrons throughout the United States. On a return trip from the West Coast, General Mitchell came to south Texas for an inspection of Ellington Field. Once on the ground, Mitchell commented that the 111th Observation Squadron was one of the best units in the nation. Mitchell spoke to enthusiastic crowds at Ellington Field confirming his belief that a strong Air Force was vital to national defense.

Also the possibility of a new municipal airfield endangered the existence of Ellington Field, rumors circulated throughout the Texas National Guard that the War Department wanted to transfer the aviation schools at Kelly and Brooks Fields to Houston. In 1926, Houston was in the process of planning a modern municipal airfield so that Houston would remain a center of commerce and trade in south Texas.

Several years later in 1927, Ellington's status was again threatened as local city leaders began to discuss the construction of a municipal airport. That airport, the present day William P. Hobby Airport, confirmed the squadron's fears that Ellington's aging facilities were obsolete; as a result the Texas National Guard decided to move the 111th to new facilities at the municipal airport instead.

The Texas National Guard and 36th Infantry Division bought most of the airfield's buildings, but the field remained unused; by 1928 Ellington was again overtaken by tall prairie grass. That same year, a fire engulfed what was left of the airfield, consuming its remaining structures, except for the concrete foundations and a metal water tower. For the next 12 years, the U.S. military leased the land to local ranchers for use as pasture.

=== World War II ===
World War II, with its increasing need for trained pilots, helped to reestablish Ellington Field as an active facility. Rep. Albert Thomas, one of Houston's representatives in the United States House of Representatives, pushed for rebuilding Ellington as a pilot training center. Beyond the area's excellent weather for flying, Thomas argued that the Houston area's petroleum refineries, upon which the war effort depended, would need military protection in the region. In 1940, construction began on a much-expanded Ellington Field, which eventually included five control towers, two 46,000-square-foot (4,300 m^{2}) hangars, the most modern medical complex in south Texas and 74 barracks.

Ellington Army Air Field 1944 Classbook

Ellington Field was the site for advanced flight training for bomber pilots. Initial plans called for the training of 2,800 bomber pilots per year at Ellington Field or about ten percent of the total number of pilots trained throughout the United States. Beginning at five-week intervals, classes of 274 cadets entered the 10-week course. Cadets moved from the AT-6 to the more complex twin-engine AT-10 or AT-11. At that level, cadets were taught how to fly the larger multi-engine aircraft. After successful completion of the advanced training course, graduates were transferred to different airfields for more training in actual bombers. Eventually the USAAC Advanced Flying School was transferred to Blackland Army Airfield in Waco.

Ellington Field was also a site for the USAAC, later USAAF, Bombardier School, also known as "the Bombardment Academy of the Air." At Ellington Field, officials planned to train 4,480 bombardier cadets per year. Bombardier cadets spent most of their time during the 10-week course in the classroom learning the skills necessary to accurately drop bombs on enemy targets. Hands-on training for the bombardier cadets took place over the Gulf of Mexico. In AT-10s or AT-11s, bombardier students practiced bombing several small islands in Matagorda Bay or small target boats anchored in the bay. The Bombardier School remained at Ellington Field until 1942.

In 1943, Ellington Field became the site for advanced navigator training when the Army Air Forces Training Command transferred the Navigator School from Mather Field, California to Houston. The USAAF Navigator School consisted of a rigorous 18-week course consisting of instruction in celestial navigation and dead reckoning. To complete the course, cadets were required to have 100 hours in navigating both local and long-range flights. By 1944, the Navigator School used instructors with combat experience to teach classes. Veteran navigators from every theater of operations lectured cadets at Ellington Field. These lectures were invaluable to cadets because the veteran navigators gave their students insights into navigating under combat conditions and life overseas. From 1941 to 1945 the Navigator School graduated 4,000 USAAF navigators that were assigned to every theater of operations during the Second World War.

By the end of 1943, more than 65 women who served in the Women's Army Corps were also stationed at Ellington. The WACs worked in noncombat Army jobs in order to free men for combat duty. "By taking over an Army job behind the lines, she frees a fighting man to join his fellow soldiers on the road to Victory," stated WAC director Colonel Oveta Culp Hobby. With the end of World War II, Ellington served primarily as a reserve air base from the end of the war in 1945 until 1948.

=== Cold War ===
==== Air Training Command ====
In 1948, Ellington Airport was one of many airfields selected to be reactivated in an effort to maintain a large military force in the United States after World War II. The airfield was reopened for active duty on 31 March 1949 and renamed Ellington Air Force Base. The Air Force activated the 3605th Navigation School and opened a USAF navigator school, with the first class entering training on 8 August 1949. Navigator cadets trained in TB-25 "Mitchell" and T-29 "Flying Classroom" aircraft. The program was part of a two-base effort, in which Ellington would provide basic navigation training and its graduates would then be reassigned to Mather AFB, California for advanced training.

Navigation training was enhanced at Ellington when the Air Force installed a microwave navigation system. To help navigators learn celestial positioning, a Houston resident paid for the construction of a planetarium at Ellington. The planetarium, which stood 50 feet (15 m) high and was topped by an aluminum dome, could hold 40 students.

In 1952, Air Training Command (ATC) expanded the training program at Ellington with the establishment of a multi-engine flying training program as part of Flying Training Air Force. As a cost-cutting measure, Headquarters USAF directed ATC in November 1953 to reorganize its Air Force Observer training program and decrease training time. ATC managed the restructure by converting primary observer training into a primary basic course and by providing advanced instruction in the basic course. Ellington was designated to provide primary observer training, with the establishment of the 3605th Observer Training Wing. In 1956, navigator and observer training were consolidated, which consisted of 42 weeks, including 180 hours of in-flight training.

During 1958–59, USAF navigator training operations were eliminated at Ellington and consolidated at Mather AFB, California and James Connally AFB, Texas. This was followed by a second consolidation to Mather AFB as the sole USAF navigator training location in 1968.

The City of Houston annexed Ellington Air Force Base in the 1960s.

==== Air Defense Command / Aerospace Defense Command ====
Ellington AFB was selected as one of the first of twenty-four Air Defense Command stations of the permanent United States surveillance radar network. On 2 December 1948, the Air Force directed the Army Corps of Engineers to proceed with construction of this and the other twenty-three sites.

Radar facilities were activated in April 1952 with the 149th Aircraft Control and Warning Squadron of the California Air National Guard operating an AN/CPS-6B radar set. On 1 February 1953 the 747th Aircraft Control and Warning Squadron assumed operational control of the site. The station was designated P-79. In 1955 the Air Force placed an AN/FPS-8 at Ellington that subsequently became an AN/GPS-3. This set operated until 1960. In 1957 an AN/FPS-6 set replaced the AN/FPS-10 height-finder radar.

In addition to the main facility, Ellington operated two AN/FPS-14 Gap Filler sites:

- Fannett, TX (P-79A): 29°45′28″N 094°14′44″W
- Van Vleck, TX (P-79B): 28°59′43″N 095°54′52″W

By 1960 Ellington performed air traffic control duties for the FAA with an ARSR-1 radar, being designated FAA site J-15. On 31 July 1963, the site was redesignated as NORAD ID Z-79. The 747th Aircraft Control and Warning Squadron was inactivated on 31 December 1969 and the FAA operated the ARSR-1 afterwards.

Assignments:

- 33d Air Division, 1 February 1953
- Oklahoma City Air Defense Sector, 1 January 1960
- 4752d Air Defense Wing, 1 September 1961
- Oklahoma City Air Defense Sector, 25 June 1963
- 31st Air Division

In late 1972, the radar facilities at Ellington were reactivated by the now-renamed Aerospace Defense Command and given the new NORAD designation Z-240. Ellington became Operating Location "C" of the 630th Radar Squadron operating an AN/FPS-90 height-finder radar, which was later modified to an AN/FPS-116 circa 1977. The AN/FPS-116 was retired circa 1988. Active duty Air Force use of Ellington ceased on 30 September 1998 when an FAA ARSR-4 radar was activated nearby at Morales, TX (J-15A) as part of the Joint Surveillance System (JSS) and Ellington's remaining USAF presence remained strictly with the Air National Guard.

==== Naval Air Reserve, Air Force Reserve and Air National Guard ====
===== Naval Air Reserve =====
The United States Navy opened a short-lived Naval Air Reserve Center at Ellington in 1957. Navy pilots and aircrews flew amphibious UF-1 Albatross and land-based P2V Neptune aircraft on antisubmarine and maritime patrol training missions over the Gulf of Mexico, but budget problems forced the closure of NAVAIRESCEN Ellington just a year later.

===== Air Force Reserve =====
The Air Force transferred Ellington AFB to Continental Air Command (CONAC) effective 1 April 1958 and undergraduate navigator training was reassigned to Mather AFB, California and James Connally AFB, Texas. As a result, in 1959, Ellington was downgraded to a reserve Air Force Base and, with the exception of a U.S. Coast Guard air station established in 1963, has primarily served a Reserve Component (RC) air base ever since.

While a full-fledged active duty installation, Ellington AFB had routinely hosted several college level Air Force Reserve Officer Training Corps (AFROTC) summer Field Training encampments for AFROTC cadets from colleges and universities in 22 states. This program briefly continued at Ellington AFB after the base transitioned to Air Force Reserve claimancy, but was eventually shifted to other active duty USAF installations. That AFROTC summer Field Training program has since been consolidated at the Air Force's Officer Training School facility at Maxwell AFB, Alabama.

In 1959, the Civil Air Patrol also moved its national headquarters from Bolling Air Force Base, DC to Ellington AFB. Eight years later, in 1967, the Civil Air Patrol relocated their national headquarters a final time to Maxwell AFB, Alabama, but a local CAP squadron still remains at Ellington.

After Ellington's transfer to CONAC in 1958, Air Force Reserve (AFRES) activities played a larger role at the base. In 1959, the 446th Troop Carrier Wing, Medium (446 TCW) hosted an "air rodeo" to determine which Air Force Reserve airlift squadron was the most accurate in the nation. Competition took place in the skies above Ellington and on the blacktop tarmac below. Forty aircrews from 14 AFRES air cargo wings from 12 different states participated in the unusual contest. During the event, aircrews dropped 260-pound bundles from C-119 Flying Boxcar aircraft flying high above the base and attempted to hit designated targets on the ground. Ellington's own 446th Troop Carrier Wing won the first annual competition.

From 1958 until 1972, the 446th was the host wing for Ellington, changing its name to the 446th Tactical Airlift Wing (446 TAW) in 1967 and acquiring C-130 Hercules aircraft the following year. In 1968, CONAC was inactivated, and the base and the Air Force Reserve flying units at Ellington were transferred to the sole cognizance of the Air Force Reserve (AFRES). While continuing to operate the C-130, the 446th also acquired C-124 Globemaster aircraft in 1971. In July 1972, the 446th was inactivated pending its redesignation as the 446th Military Airlift Wing (Associate) and its relocation to McChord AFB, Washington the following year as an Air Force Reserve Associate airlift wing to the active duty 62nd Military Airlift Wing at McChord flying the C-141 Starlifter.

Despite the 446th's interim inactivation, Air Force Reserve flying activities continued at Ellington under the 924th Tactical Airlift Group (924 TAG), which had flown the C-119 Flying Boxcar aircraft until 1967 when it also transitioned to the C-130 Hercules aircraft. However, instead of transferring host unit responsibilities from the 446th to the 924th, primary host wing/group responsibilities at Ellington shifted to the then-147th Fighter-Interceptor Group (147 FIG) of the Texas Air National Guard and the installation became known as Ellington Air National Guard Base.

In 1976, the 924 TAG relocated to Bergstrom AFB, Texas and with the 924th's departure, other portions of former USAF infrastructure at Ellington were transferred to NASA, to the U.S. Coast Guard as part of Coast Guard Air Station Houston, and to other DoD Reserve Component activities. However, a significant portion base real estate and infrastructure was transferred to civilian control of the City of Houston for conversion to civilian aviation and industrial use.

===== Texas Air National Guard =====
With these post-1976 transitions, the Texas Air National Guard and the 147 FIG became the dominant military presence at what was now-Ellington ANGB.

The history of the ANG presence at Ellington dates to 1957 when the Texas Air National Guard's 111th Fighter-Interceptor Squadron (111 FIS) at then-Ellington AFB was authorized to expand to a group level and was redesignated the 147th Fighter-Interceptor Group (147 FIG) under the 136th Air Defense Wing. On 1 July 1957, the National Guard Bureau extended federal recognition to the 147th Fighter-Interceptor Group.

Initially equipped with the F-86D Sabre, the group transitioned to the F-86L Sabre in 1959. In August 1960, the unit became one of the first Air National Guard units to transition to the F-102A Delta Dagger and began 24-hour air defense alert operations to guard the Texas Gulf coast. In August 1961, as part of an Air Defense Command re-organization, the Group's assignment to 136th Air Defense Wing was terminated and the 147th was directly assigned to the Texas Air National Guard while being operationally gained by the Air Defense Command's 33rd Air Division (33 AD).

On 1 January 1970, the 147th became the Air National Guard's Replacement Training Unit (RTU) for the F-102A/TF-102B when the active duty Air Force ceased F-102A training and closed Perrin AFB, Texas on 30 June 1971. At that point, the 147 FIG became the RTU for all active duty USAF and Air National Guard F-102 pilots. In May 1971, the 147th added F-101B/F Voodoos and became the RTU for the twin-seat F-101F type, while also continuing as the F-102 Delta Dagger RTU. In January 1975, after 14 years of service, the unit's F-102s were retired and the unit transitioned to solely F-101s. With the disestablishment of Aerospace Defense Command, operational claimancy for the 147 FIG shifted to Tactical Air Command.

In 1982, the F-101s were retired and the 147th was reequipped with the F-4C Phantom II in the air defense mission. In November 1986, the F-4Cs were replaced by later model F-4D Phantom IIs. In December 1989, the 147th began receiving the Block 15 F-16 Fighting Falcon to replace their F-4Ds, with the last F-16A ADF arriving in April 1990. In 1992, the unit was redesignated the 147th Fighter Group (147 FG) and, with the inactivation of Tactical Air Command, became operationally-gained by Air Combat Command. In 1995, the group was redesignated as the 147th Fighter Wing (147 FW) and in 1996 transitioned to the Block 25 F-16C/D and assumed an air-to-ground mission in addition to its historic air-to-air mission.

The 2005 Base Realignment and Closure Commission recommended the retirement of all USAF Block 25 F-16C/D aircraft, the Block 25s primarily residing in Air National Guard units. On 7 June 2008, the 147 FW retired its last two F-16 aircraft and transitioned to the unmanned, remotely piloted MQ-1 Predator aircraft and was renamed the 147th Reconnaissance Wing (147 RW) the same month.

With the retirement of 147th's F-16 aircraft, the 24/7/365 Continental NORAD Region (CONR) air defense alert mission for the western Gulf of Mexico and southern Texas border previously performed by the 147th needed to be replaced by another F-16 unit. As a result, the 138th Fighter Wing (138 FW) of the Oklahoma Air National Guard assumed the 147th's former 24/7/365 alert mission and now maintains a rotational detachment of F-16C aircraft, pilots, maintainers, and security personnel as an operating location what is now Ellington Field Joint Reserve Base.

On 28 July 2017, the 147 RW began transition to the also unmanned and remotely piloted MQ-9 Reaper aircraft and began retiring its extant MQ-1 aircraft. With this transition, the 147 RW was redesignated again as the 147th Attack Wing (147 ATKW) and remains operationally gained by Air Combat Command.

=== National Aeronautics and Space Administration ===
==== NASA use ====
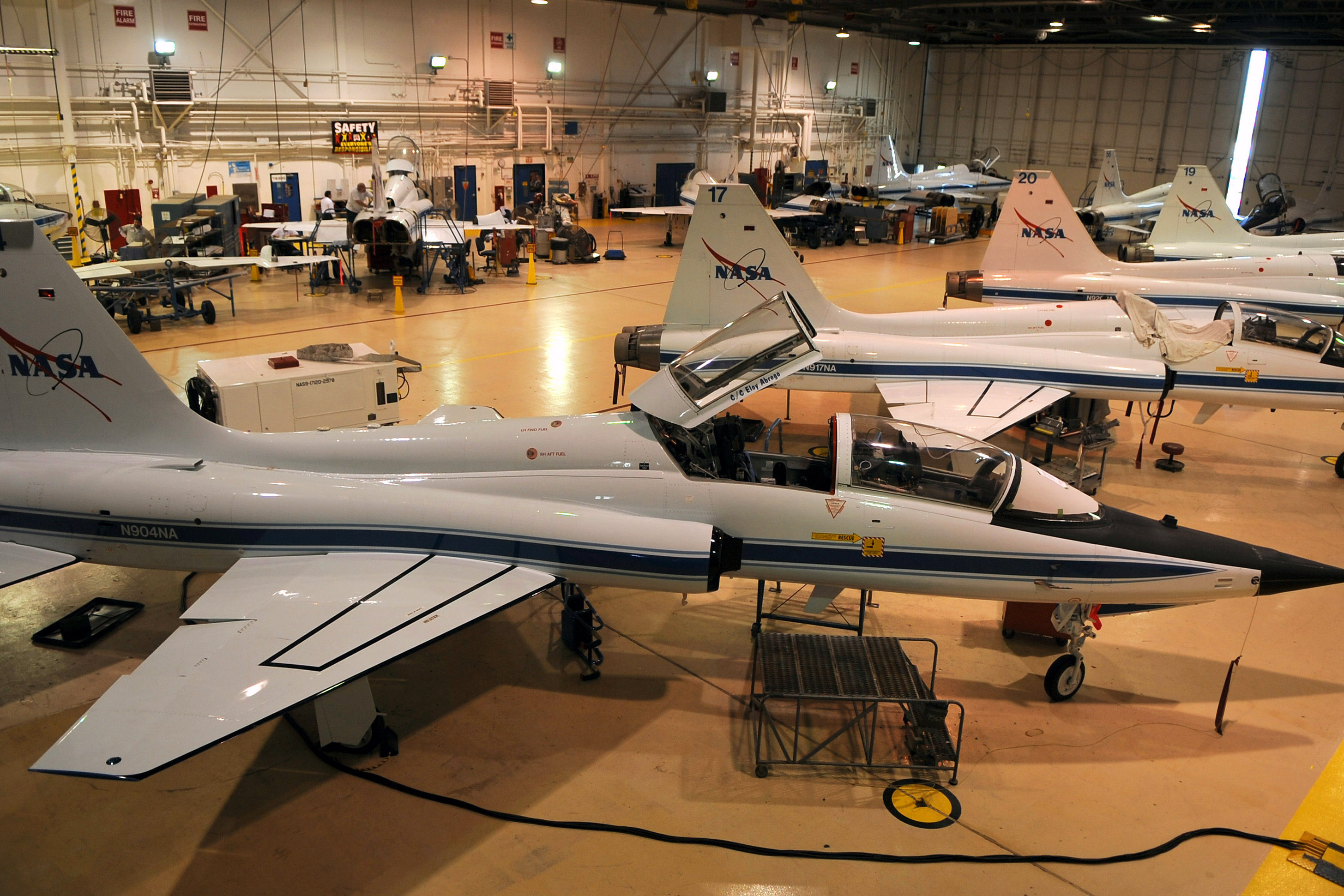
NASA T-38s in the hangar at Ellington Field

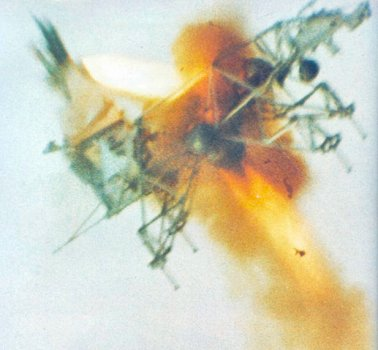
Test pilot Stuart Present ejects safely from crashing LLTV, 29 January 1971.

From the 1950s through the 1970s, Ellington Field was utilized for pilot and navigator training for the active Air Force, Air Force Reserve, Air National Guard, and Naval Air Reserve, Marine Air Reserve, and foreign students.

NASA established its facilities at Ellington as its base for astronaut flight proficiency training and specialized aircraft training in the early 1960s because of its proximity to the newly constructed Manned Spacecraft Center. T-38 Talon (T-38N) aircraft bailed from USAF and assigned NASA civilian registration numbers are the primary jet aircraft used for astronaut training at Ellington. From 1967, Ellington was used for the Apollo program's Lunar Landing Training Vehicle. Today, most of NASA's aircraft such as the T-38s, RB-57s, C-9s, and other aircraft based at the Johnson Space (Manned Spacecraft) Center are kept and maintained at the base.

=== Current status ===
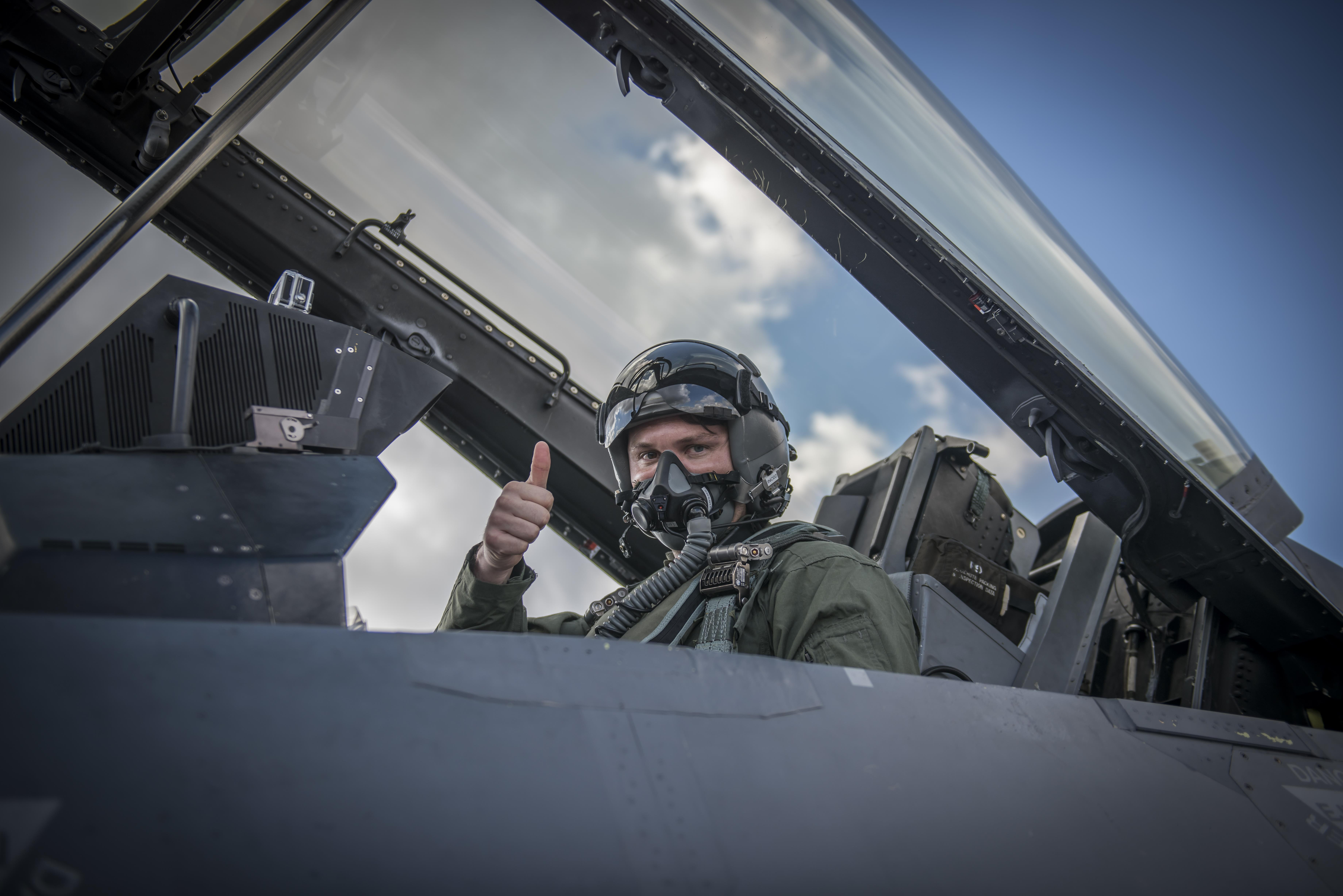
Pete Hegseth in a F-16 Fighting Falcon while visiting Ellington Field Joint Reserve Base, 2017

Ellington Field was officially inactivated by the Air Force in 1976 and all Air Force Reserve squadrons were transferred to other military facilities; however the Reserve components of the United States Armed Forces, such as the Texas Air National Guard, the Texas Army National Guard, the United States Army Reserve, United States Navy Reserve, the United States Marine Corps Reserve, (1st Battalion, 23d Marines), the United States Coast Guard (Coast Guard Air Station Houston) and the non-profit charitable youth program United States Naval Sea Cadet Corps still maintain a military presence at the base. In 1984, the city of Houston purchased the non-military portion of Ellington to use as a third civil airport, and it was renamed Ellington Airport on 14 January 2009, while the military cantonment area is known as Ellington Field Joint Reserve Base and Coast Guard Air Station Houston.

== See also ==
- Air National Guard
- Civil Air Patrol (US Air Force Auxiliary)
- List of military installations in Texas
- List of active United States military aircraft
- List of military aircraft of the United States
- List of United States Air Force installations
- Texas World War II Army Airfields

33d Flying Training Wing (World War II) (Flying Training)
80th Flying Training Wing (World War II) (Navigation Training)

- List of USAF Aerospace Defense Command General Surveillance Radar Stations
- List of Training Section Air Service airfields
