= AlpenGold Hotel Davos =

Hotel in Davos, Switzerland

Coordinates: 46.813500°N 9.853500°E

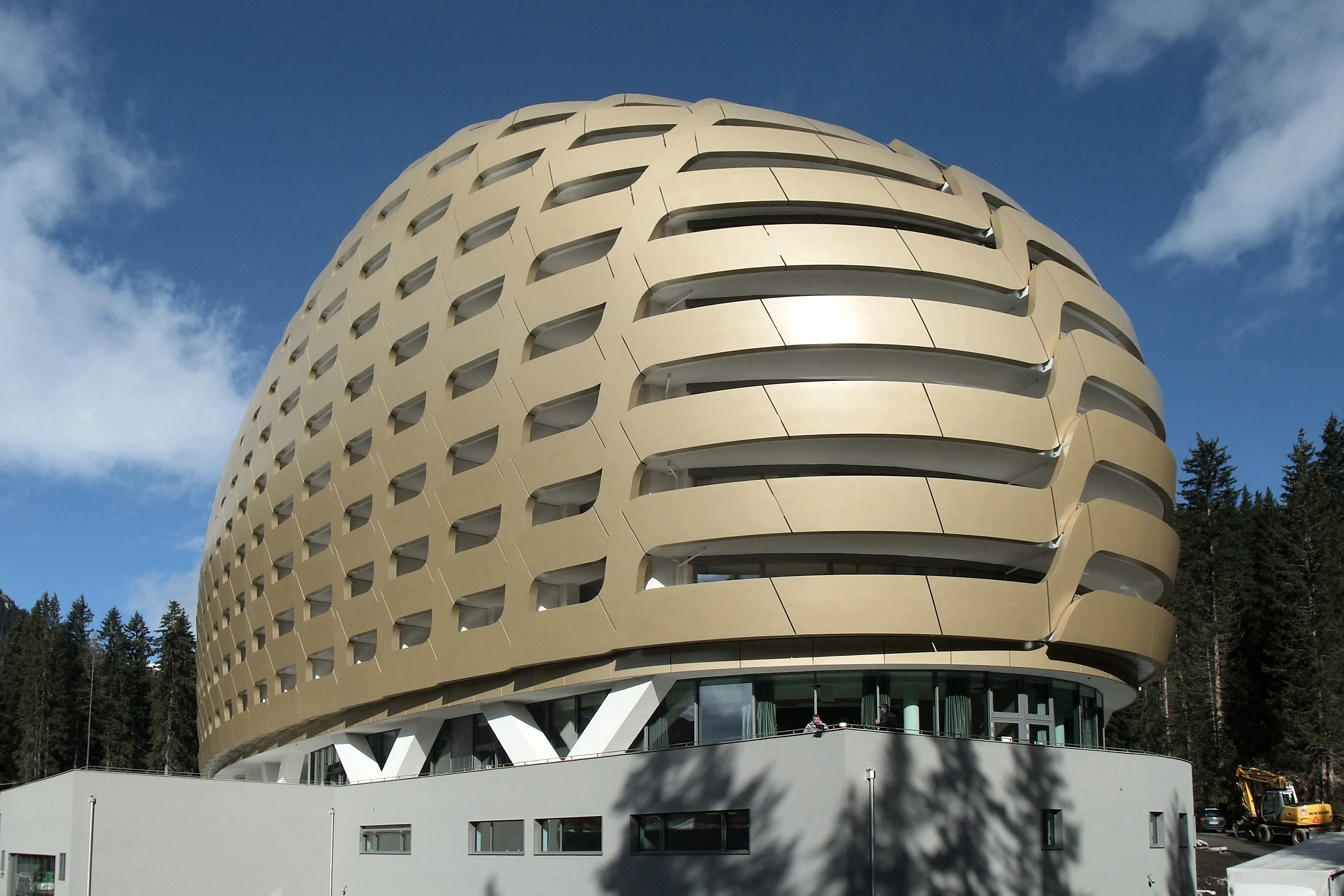
The former InterContinental Davos seen just before opening

The AlpenGold Hotel, formerly branded as InterContinental, is a luxury hotel located in Davos, Switzerland. Opened in 2013 to serve as a vacation and business resort in the Grison Alps, it was managed under the brand InterContinental until 2021, one of the world's major luxury hotel and resort brands. The building is known worldwide for its "golden egg" architecture; it is the main hotel supporting the annual January meeting of the World Economic Forum (WEF) in Davos.

The hotel features 216 rooms, an indoor and outdoor swimming pool, a spa, as well as a private cinema.
