= Coast Guard Air Station Houston =

US Coast Guard base near Houston, Texas

Coordinates: 29.6103°N 95.1691°W

Coast Guard Air Station Houston
- Part of Ellington Field Joint Reserve Base
- Houston, Texas in the United States
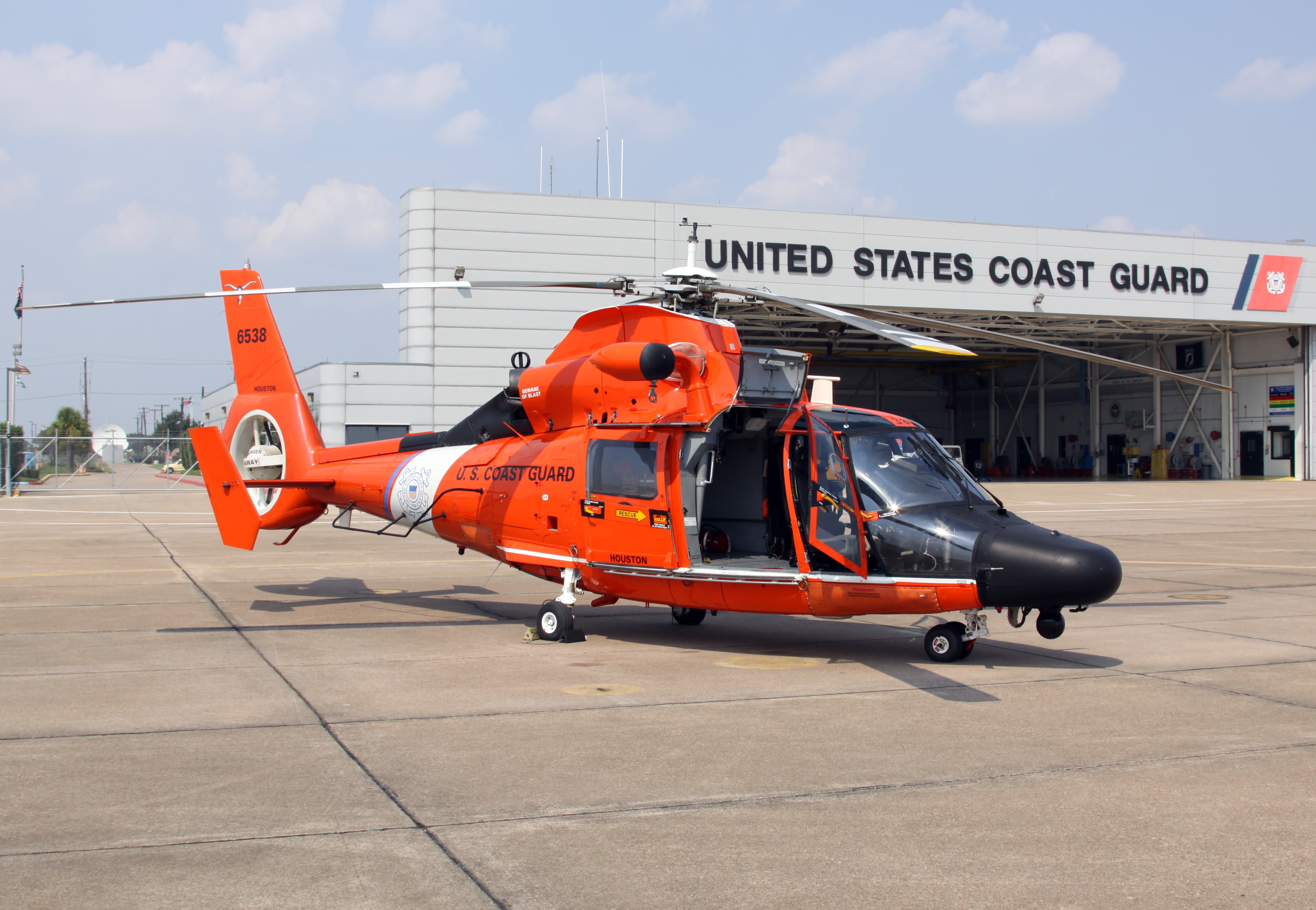
- A US Coast Guard MH-65C at CGAS Houston in 2010

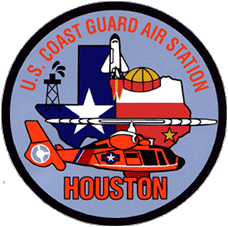

Site information
- Type: Coast Guard Air Station
- Owner: Department of Homeland Security
- Operator: United States Coast Guard
- Controlled by: Eighth District
- Condition: Operational
- Aircraft operated: MH-65E Dolphin (3)
- Website: Official website

Location
- Location in the United States

Site history
- Built: 1942 (as part of Ellington Field)
- In use: 1963 – present

Garrison information
- Current commander: Commander Anthony J. Guido

Airfield information
- Identifiers: IATA: EFD, ICAO: KEFD, FAA LID: EFD, WMO: 722436
- Elevation: 10 metres (33 ft) AMSL
Runways
Direction	Length and surface
17R/35L	2,743.5 metres (9,001 ft) Concrete
4/22	2,438.7 metres (8,001 ft) Concrete
17L/35R	1,404.8 metres (4,609 ft) Concrete
- Airfield shared with Ellington Airport; Source: Federal Aviation Administration

United States Coast Guard Air Station Houston is a United States Coast Guard Air Station located 15 miles (24 km) southeast of downtown Houston, Texas on board the Ellington Field Joint Reserve Base (JRB).

Coast Guard Air Station (CGAS) Houston has provided an all-weather 24/7 Search & Rescue (SAR) coverage capability to the Texas and Louisiana Gulf Coast since 1963.

== Missions ==
CGAS Houston operates three MH-65E "Dolphin" helicopters, patrolling an area from the Colorado River at Matagorda Bay, Texas, to White Lake, Louisiana, averaging more than 180 SAR cases a year. The missions include Search and Rescue (SAR), Homeland Security, Fisheries Enforcement, Environmental Protection, and Maritime Law Enforcement.

CGAS Houston's Area of Responsibility (AOR) includes 3 of the 4 Strategic Petroleum Reserve facilities in the United States, the South Texas Nuclear Generating Station, and the expansive petroleum and gas industry located on board hundreds of oil and gas platforms in the Gulf of Mexico. CGAS Houston's AOR also include the strategic ports and waterways of Freeport, TX, Sabine, TX, Lake Charles, LA, as well as the U.S.'s second busiest port in terms of total cargo volume trade in the Houston Ship Channel.

CGAS Houston aircraft protect the environment by patrolling the ecologically rich Gulf of Mexico fisheries area, including the fragile Flower Garden National Marine Sanctuary.

In 2016, CGAS Houston celebrated the 100th anniversary of Coast Guard Aviation.

== History ==
CGAS Houston was commissioned on December 23, 1963, on a one-acre parcel of land at Ellington AFB, 15 miles (24 km) southeast of downtown Houston. Two HH-52A Sea Guard helicopters, seven Officer/pilots, and 18 enlisted mechanics/aircrewmen set up shop in a 24,000-foot (7,300 m) World War II era hangar built in 1942. CDR David W. DeFreest assumed command as the Air Station's first Commanding Officer. An alternative site at Scholes Field in Galveston, Texas, was considered up until the actual commissioning at Ellington AFB. CGAS Houston's commissioning coincides with the beginning of development of Clear Lake City as a business and residential community surrounding the blossoming NASA complex, then called the Manned Spacecraft Center.

== Notable ==
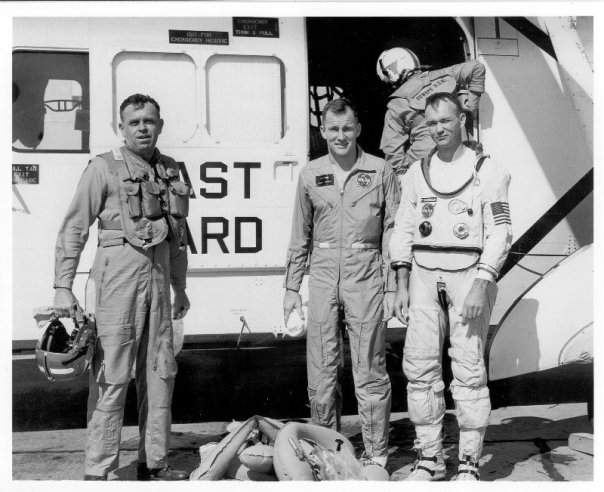
CAPT Gus Schrode, CO of CGAS Houston with NASA astronauts Ed White and Michael Collins for hoist training using an HH-52A in October 1965.

1964 AIRSTA assists Texas Department of Health in battling an encephalitis epidemic in the Houston area. Coast Guard helicopters drop more than 10,000 pounds of insecticide.

1965 AIRSTA helicopters routinely hoist Gemini astronauts, undergoing egress training from their space capsules in the Gulf during the drills.

Two AIRSTA helicopters deploy to New Orleans in September to assist people stranded by Hurricane Betsy.

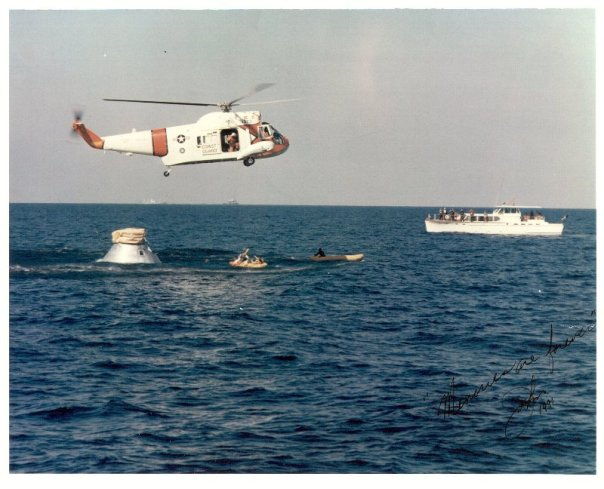
CGAS Houston providing hoist training for Apollo astronauts with an HH-52A off of Galveston, Texas, in June 1967.

1967

AIRSTA helicopters rescue 451 people from rooftops, trees and "other places of peril" during and after Hurricane Beulah in September.

1974 AIRSTA receives its third helicopter.

1975 In August, GLOBTIK SUN, a 734-foot (224 m) British tanker, rams and unmanned oil rig off Galveston, setting both ablaze. AIRSTA helos transport injured to shore, search for missing crewmen, and conduct pollution overflights.

1978 AIRSTA receives its fourth helicopter for support of pollution patrol effort and increased shipboard deployments during law enforcement patrols. Helicopters deploy 21 weeks annually on the average. Station personnel now number 60.

1979 In May, RANGER I drilling platform collapses 12 miles (19 km) south of Galveston. AIRSTA searches for survivors.

In July AIRSTA helicopters fly flood relief missions in SE Texas following Tropical Storm Claudette.

Burmah Agate, a tanker carrying 16 million US gallons (61,000 m^{3}) of oil, collides with the freighter Mimosa off Galveston in November. AIRSTA helicopters rescue 27 crewmen from the burning vessels and fly more than 115.6 hours searching for the 31 missing crewmen and on pollution over-flights. The Burmah Agate burns for 69 days.

1980 Air Station helicopter and crew deploy to South Florida to assist other Coast Guard and government units with the "Cuban Refugee Exodus." personnel assigned to these deployments received the Humanitarian Service Medal.

1982–1984 Studies conducted to determine if AIRSTA should be renovated, relocated to Scholes Field, or housed in new hangar to be built at Ellington.

1983 In August, Hurricane Alicia devastates the Houston/Galveston area. AIRSTA weathered the storm with two helos battened down in the hangar (a third was deployed on CGC Valiant) and half the crew remaining on board. Post storm flights assisting stranded residents, delivering food, water and medical supplies, and surveying aid-to-navigation damage, total 52 hours. Damage to AIRSTA has significant impact on relocation studies. AIRSTA helos have rendered assistance following violent storms and hurricanes more than nine times since 1963, including Gulfport, MS (1969); Brownsville, TX (1978); and Corpus Christi (1980).

1984 On July 1, Ellington AFB formally turned over the city of Houston and renamed Ellington Field.

Within a two-week span in August, two separate environmental incidents threaten the Houston/Galveston area. 1700 quart-size bottles of toxic pesticide leak overboard from the containership Rio Nuquen, docked at the turning basin of the Houston Ship Channel. The British tanker, Alvenus, leaks hundreds of thousands of barrels of oil, after it runs aground in the Calcasieu Ship Channel off Cameron, LA. AIRSTA helos launch on numerous surveillance flights during both of these incidents.

1984–1985 Decision made to build new hangar at north end of Ellington Field on U.S. Government property. Spaw Glass of Houston to build hangar from plans drawn up by Lockwood, Andrews & Newnam, Inc.

1985 Ground breaking for new hangar at north end of Ellington Field happens on October 2.

In October, a commercial jackup rig capsizes off Galveston. AIRSTA helos airlift survivors to shore.

1986 On January 17, an oil company helo crashes in mud off Sabine. AIRSTA helo and EMT from station Sabine rescue four men on board and fly injured personnel to hospital.

Although forecast days previously in May, sudden "microburst" thunderstorms catch many recreational boaters off guard on Lake Livingston and Galveston Bay. Rapid response by AIRSTA helos along with other Coast Guard, Auxiliary and county rescue units resulted in not a single life being lost on Galveston Bay.

Hollywood Marine barge burns for ten days in October at Intercontinental Terminal near San Jacinto Monument, closing down Houston Ship Channel for an unprecedented four days.

A December Texas City refinery fire kills one in chemical inferno reminiscent of twin-ship explosion and fire that flattened the city almost forty years ago.

1987 Beneficial occupancy is reached on May 26 for completed new hangar.

Dedication of new AIRSTA occurs on June 18.

1988 On November 10 AIRSTA's first HH-65A Dolphin helicopter arrives.

1989 Air Station Houston is operational with four HH-65A helicopters on March 17.

Last HH-52A departs Air Station on April 2.

Air Station helos rescue 14 people from three different capsized fishing vessels during Hurricane Chantal on August 1. Two helos penetrate the eye of the storm to reach 7 of these at the Sabine Jetty and to return to base.

1990 Air Station becomes operational with rescue swimmers on February 1. Five swimmers assigned.

Tanker Mega Borg explodes 60 miles (97 km) south of Galveston in the lightering area on June 9. This begins two weeks of intense operations with 17 hours flown by unit aircraft, temporary assignment of HC-130, HH-3F, and additional HH-65A aircraft, and the stockpiling of tons of pollution abatement equipment at the unit.

An Apex barge collides with the Greek tanker Shinoussa and runs aground off Redfish Reef and breaks open on July 29. This begins another two weeks of aerial monitoring and support involving over 75 flight hours. The 200th Year Coast Guard Day picnic attendance is light as many personnel are involved with spill response.

1990–1991 Air Station Houston supports Operation Desert Shield/Storm with numerous over-flights of loading areas, the Houston Ship Channel, and the strategic oil reserve in Freeport, TX. Over three Army divisions deployed from the Houston area during this conflict with Iraq. All personnel assigned to the station were awarded the National Defense Service Medal.

1992 January Heavy rains throughout Texas swell the Trinity and Brazos rivers and associated tributaries. The Brazos rises 35 feet (11 m) and floods much of Brazoria County. Air Station Houston provides multiple flights each day over a two-week period to assist Coast Guard surface teams and local authorities.

1993 The "storm of the century" hits the Gulf Coast on 12–13 March. Air Station Houston responded by saving 6 lives and 2 vessels and assisting others over an 18-hour period as heavy storms spawned life-threatening seas and skies.

1994 October Remnants of Hurricane Rosa dump more than 25 inches of rain on the Houston area from 18 to 31 October causing widespread flooding along the San Jacinto River. Air Station Houston responded by evacuating over 450 people from the flooded region. Oil and gas pipelines, which crossed the river, gave way, creating a massive oil/gas spill, which exploded and burned for five days. The units provided critical support to the Marine Safety Office's response and cleanup operations associated with this disaster.

1997 April through September: Air Station Houston deploys a helicopter and crew on USCGC LEGARE (WMEC 912) homeport in Portsmouth, Virginia for the first operational deployment of a 270-foot (82 m) Coast Guard Cutter to DOD sponsored BALTOPS/USEUCOM deployment. LEGARE and the Deployed helicopter cross the Atlantic and interact with the U. S. Navy and 21 other countries during naval exercises, as well as military and Coast Guard exchanges. Regions visited included: the Baltic Sea, the Mediterranean Sea, and the Black Sea with port calls/exchanges in England, Germany, Lithuania, Latvia, Estonia, Russia, Poland, Denmark, Belgium, Spain, Morocco, Malta, Tunisia, Turkey, Georgia, Ukraine, Romania, Italy, and Ireland.

1999 October Air Station Houston achieves a new record for the number of SAR cases prosecuted in one 12-month period. During fiscal year 1999, the Air Station responded to 301 SAR cases.

2000 Air Station Houston deploys an aircraft to Air Station Detroit from June until August to man an 'OPFAC' conducting search and rescue at Muskegon IL. Air Station Houston crewmembers were assigned during much of this time.

2001 Air Station Houston plays a major role in the aftermath of Tropical Storm Allison in June. With over 80 hoists throughout the 24-hour period, the Air Station was a major factor in the lives of many Houstonians. The flooding occurred four days after the initial storm. Four days prior, during the throes of the storm, an Air Station Houston helicopter flew into the storm through 65+ knot winds to perform a medevac.

2008 Hurricane Ike ravaged Eastern Texas on September 17. Prior to Ike making landfall, a massive storm surge flooded Bolivar Peninsula trapping 200+residents. Coast Guard Air Station Houston dispatched all three helicopters, two of which had already been prepositioned to Corpus Christi, to respond. In all, 59 lives were saved by Air Station flight crews before the winds became too severe to continue. In the weeks following the storm, Air Station Houston provided more than 115 flight-hours in support of post-storm recovery operations and media/VIP over-flights.

2009-2013 Air Station Houston becomes Airborne Use of Force compliant and has the capabilities to stop maritime threats through use of M-14T EBR selective fire rifle and M240H machine gun.

2017 Air Station Houston plays a major role in over 3,000 air rescues in the Hurricane Harvey aftermath housing multiple helicopters from other air stations to provide additional mutual aid in efforts to save lives.

2020 Air Station Houston becomes the first operational unit to transition from the MH-65D to the MH-65E aircraft in June 2020.
