= Timeline of the Joe Biden presidency (2021 Q4) =

The following is a timeline of the presidency of Joe Biden during the fourth and last quarter of 2021, from October 1 to December 31, 2021. For a complete itinerary of his travels, see List of presidential trips made by Joe Biden (2021). To navigate between quarters, see timeline of the Joe Biden presidency.

== Timeline ==
=== October 2021 ===
Date	Events	Photos/videos
Friday, October 1	President Biden travels to Capitol Hill where a divided Democratic Party is struggling to pass a Senate-approved infrastructure bill. Questioned on the deadline, Biden said "It doesn't matter when. It doesn't whether it's in six minutes, six days, or six weeks -- we're going to get it done."	President Biden and House Speaker Nancy Pelosi along with others exiting Capitol Hill
Saturday, October 2	President Biden works to pass the infrastructure bill and says frustration is part of government before leaving for the weekend in Wilmington, Delaware.	
Sunday, October 3		
Monday, October 4	President Biden returns to the White House to announce that the government could breach its $28.4 trillion debt limit in a historic default unless both parties join to vote on the infrastructure bill in the coming weeks.	President Biden delivers remarks on the debt ceiling
Tuesday, October 5	President Biden travels to Michigan where he delivers remarks about his spending proposals, calling opponents of the proposals as being "complicit in America's decline".; The U.S. Senate confirms Biden appointee Damian Williams as Attorney for the Southern District of New York, making him the first African American to lead the office.	President Biden visits the union training facility in Howell, Michigan, for his "Build Back Better" agenda
Wednesday, October 6	Senate Minority Leader Mitch McConnell offer a short-term suspension on the U.S. debt celling to avert an economical crisis until Democrats are able to pass a permanent solution.; President Biden meets with multiple CEOs of several major banks to talk about the debt ceiling.	President Biden hosts a meeting with CEOs of multiple banks
Thursday, October 7	President Biden says that more U.S. businesses need vaccine mandates.; NASA posts a video called Get Curious with Vice President Harris on YouTube.	
Friday, October 8	President Biden signs a bill called the HAVANA Act authorizing additional support for diplomats and government officials who are suffering from Havana syndrome.; President Biden signs a proclamation restoring the Bear Ears and Grand Staircase national monuments.; President Biden delivers remarks on the economy and job creation figures for September.; President Biden issues a proclamation to make Indigenous Peoples' Day a federal holiday, making him the first president to do so.; President Biden rejects the attempt by former president Donald Trump to assert the executive privilege over records relating to the 2021 Capitol attack.	President Biden delivers remarks about the September jobs report
Saturday, October 9		
Sunday, October 10		
Monday, October 11	President Biden and First Lady Jill Biden attend his nephew's wedding, Cuffe Owens, who is the son of President Biden's sister Valerie Biden Owens, to reality TV star Meghan O'Toole King.	
Tuesday, October 12	President Biden extends the Foreign Narcotics Kingpin Designation Act to next year.; Vice President Harris meets with Israeli foreign minister Yair Lapid.; The Biden administration announced that they would no longer carry out mass arrests of unauthorized immigrants at worksites, instead focusing on, in Antony Blinken's words, illegal acts committed by unscrupulous employers.	Vice President Harris (left) with Lapid (right)
Wednesday, October 13	President Biden signs two acts into law, H.R. 2278, which links the September 11th National Memorial Trail with the National September 11 Memorial & Museum, the National 9/11 Pentagon Memorial, and the Flight 93 National Memorial. The second act is S. 848, known as "Consider Teachers Act of 2021", which modifies the service obligation verification process for TEACH Grant recipients and to extend the service obligation window due to the pandemic.; The Biden administration announces the expansion of offshore wind energy for a clean energy revolution, potentially holding as many as seven new offshore lease sales by 2025.; President Biden delivers remarks about easing supply chain bottlenecks. The carriers of these goods, Walmart, FedEx, and UPS, will work around the clock.; Vice President Harris holds a meeting with Barbadian prime minister Mia Mottley.	President Biden signs H.R. 2278 into law President Biden delivers remarks about easing the supply chain bottleneck Vice President Harris holds a bilateral meeting with Barbadian Prime Minister Mia Amor Mottley
Thursday, October 14	President Biden delivers remarks about vaccine mandates.; President Biden holds a bilateral meeting with Kenyan President Uhuru Kenyatta at the White House.; The Biden administration plans to restart the Remain in Mexico policy starting in mid-November.	President Biden delivers remarks about vaccine mandates President Biden and Kenyan President Uhuru Kenyatta
Friday, October 15	President Biden calls Bill Clinton after the former president was hospitalized with an infection.; President Biden visits the Capitol Child Development Center in Hartford, Connecticut, to promote his Build Back Better Agenda. Crowds gathered around the street in support and protest of Biden.; President Biden visits the University of Connecticut to pitch his infrastructure bill and rededicate The Dodd Center for Human Rights.; First Lady Jill Biden campaigns for gubernatorial candidate Terry McAuliffe in Henrico County, Virginia, and Governor Phil Murphy at the New Jersey college Middlesex.	President Biden delivers remarks about the Build Back Better plan at the Capitol Child Development Center President Biden at UConn, October 15, 2021
Saturday, October 16	President Biden and First Lady Jill Biden honor fallen law enforcement officers at the United States Capitol for the 40th National Peace Officers' Memorial Service.	From left to right: Joe and Jill Biden, Alejandro Mayorkas, and other officials
Sunday, October 17		
Monday, October 18	President Biden releases a statement on the death of former Secretary of State Colin Powell.; President Biden and First Lady Jill Biden host a White House ceremony to celebrate the National Teachers of the Year from 2020 and 2021.; Zalmay Khalilzad, the US Envoy to Afghanistan, steps down from his position, less than two months after the withdrawal of US troops from Afghanistan.	President Biden and First Lady Jill Biden host the Teacher of the Year Awards
Tuesday, October 19	President Biden extends the deadline to the Fentanyl Sanctions Act for the Commission on Combating Synthetic Opioid Trafficking to February 2022.; President Biden signs an executive order that hopes to eliminate racial problems in the U.S. education system among African-Americans, and improve their education and financial outcomes.; Jen Psaki and an analysis from the New York Post confirms that the government is flying illegal underage Haitian immigrants from the Florida border to New York early in the morning.	
Wednesday, October 20	President Biden delivers remarks about his bipartisan infrastructure bill and his childhood in his hometown of Scranton, Pennsylvania.; Staff members of The White House celebrates Vice President Harris' birthday, including Biden and her husband Emhoff.	President Biden handing Vice President Harris flowers for her birthday.
Thursday, October 21	President Biden attends a CNN Town Hall located in Baltimore, Maryland, hosted by Anderson Cooper. He blamed OPEC for the increasing gas prices. On the other hand, Saudi Arabia's minister of energy, Abdulaziz bin Salman Al Saud, said that they have a limited role in oil and that he is upset that gas oil is overshadowing actual real problems.; President Biden and Vice President Harris celebrate the 10th anniversary of the Martin Luther King Jr. Memorial. Biden compared his priorities on voting rights, police reform, and climate change to that of King Jr. in the civil rights movement. He mainly remarked about the infrastructure bill debate and the COVID-19 pandemic. Harris said that King was a prophet and said that the monument is "dedicated to a man who lived among us".; Vice President Harris campaigns with former Virginia governor and gubernatorial candidate Terry McAuliffe in Dumfries ahead of the gubernatorial election.	President Biden and Vice President Harris celebrating the 10th anniversary of the MLK Memorial President Biden at the CNN Town Hall while Biden is talking to Americans
Friday, October 22	President Biden delays release of documents of the JFK assassination, citing pandemic related issues. The documents will release on December 15 of 2021 out of respect, while the remaining ones will be reviewed and will release the same day next year.	
Saturday, October 23	Former president Barack Obama campaigns with former Virginia governor and gubernatorial candidate Terry McAuliffe in Richmond ahead of the gubernatorial election.	
Sunday, October 24		
Monday, October 25	President Biden goes to New Jersey to promote his economic agenda, saying that the infrastructure bill is for "rebuilding the arteries of America" and speaking in length about the Portal Bridge at a maintenance facility in Kearny, New Jersey. He also spoke in an elementary school in Plainfield about a fundamental shift in learning.; President Biden rejects the latest executive privilege request by former president Donald Trump to keep the documents of the January 6 Capitol attack out of Congress' hands.	President Biden delivers remarks about the Build Back Better Plan and the infrastructure bill President Biden visits East End Elementary School in Plainfield, New Jersey to promote his Build Back Better agenda
Tuesday, October 26	President Biden briefly participates in the virtual US-ASEAN meeting with 10 leaders from Southeast Asian countries, hosted by Brunei. This is the first time since the beginning of the Trump administration in 2017 when a US president has attended the meeting.; President Biden campaigns with former Virginia governor and gubernatorial candidate Terry McAuliffe in Arlington ahead of the gubernatorial election.	President Biden briefly participates in the US-ASEAN meeting
Wednesday, October 27	President Biden honors the victims of the Pittsburgh synagogue shooting on the third anniversary of it.	
Thursday, October 28	Florida Governor Ron DeSantis sues President Biden over his vaccine mandates, alleging that the president doesn't have the authority and that it violates procurement law.; After months of negotiations, President Biden announces the framework for his infrastructure bill ahead of his trip to Rome. House Speaker Pelosi appeared at an afternoon news conference announcing the proposal, but did not vote on it. Senator Bernie Sanders encouraged progressive colleagues to vote out of the package, saying that it needed to be improved and that it had some gaps.	President Biden delivers remarks about his Path Out of the Pandemic and his economic plan
Friday, October 29	President Biden and First Lady Jill Biden meet with Pope Francis at Vatican City.; President Biden holds bilateral meetings with Italian president Sergio Mattarella and Italian prime minister Mario Draghi.; President Biden holds a bilateral meeting with French president Emmanuel Macron.; Vice President Harris campaigns with former Virginia governor and gubernatorial candidate Terry McAuliffe in Norfolk ahead of the gubernatorial election.	President Biden with Pope Francis President Biden with President Macron
Saturday, October 30	President Biden attends the G20 summit hosted by Italian prime minister Mario Draghi.	G-20 leaders at the 2021 Rome Summit
Sunday, October 31	President Biden convenes with world leaders during the G20 summit to address supply chain changes and other interruptions in the global economy.; President Biden holds a bilateral meeting with Turkish president Recep Tayyip Erdoğan.; President Biden and the leader of the European Union Ursula von der Leyen announce a deal that will crack down on "dirty steel" from China that cause climate change.; White House Press Secretary Jen Psaki announced that she tested positive for COVID-19.	President Biden hosts G20 meeting and delivers remarks on supply chain changes

=== November 2021 ===
Date	Events	Photos/videos
Monday, November 1	President Biden attends the COP26 conference in Glasgow and mainly remarks about climate change.; President Biden holds a bilateral meeting with Indonesian president Joko Widodo to share concerns over the 2021 Myanmar coup d'état and agreed that the Burmese military must cease violence, release political prisoners, and return to democracy.	
Tuesday, November 2	President Biden announces a plan at the COP26 conference that reduces methane emissions, as well as a plan to end and reverse deforestation, joining other world leaders.	President Biden and Boris Johnson at the COP26 conference President Biden delivers remarks at the COP26 press conference
Wednesday, November 3	President Biden returns to the White House early in the morning, in which he declined a question about the 2021 Virginia gubernatorial election.; President Biden nominates Judge Christina Silva and law professor Anne Rachel Traum for federal district judges in Nevada.; The Department of Labor announced that the administration's business vaccine mandate, which was developed by the Occupational Safety and Health Administration, would be published soon.; President Biden remarks about the CDC's authorization for the COVID-19 vaccine for five to eleven years old.; The Biden administration puts the NSO Group, the developer of the controversial spyware Pegasus, on the United States entity list, banning business deals with them.	President Biden delivers remarks about authorization of COVID-19 vaccines for kids ages five to eleven
Thursday, November 4	The Biden administration publishes details of vaccine mandates for workers.; Ben Shapiro's company, The Daily Wire, filed a lawsuit against the Biden administration over the COVID-19 vaccine mandate.; A White House aide who accompanied with President Biden to the COP26 conference has tested positive for COVID-19. He is currently isolating in Scotland.; President Biden and First Lady Jill Biden light a diya in the Blue Room of the White House to celebrate Diwali.	President Biden and First Lady Jill Biden light a diya in the White House to celebrate Diwali
Friday, November 5	President Biden delivers remarks on the economy and job creation figures for October.; Texas Attorney General Ken Paxton files a lawsuit against the Biden administration for the COVID-19 vaccine mandates.; President Biden attends the funeral of former Secretary of State Colin Powell at the Washington National Cathedral. Former presidents George W. Bush and Barack Obama were also in attendance.; The House passes the Infrastructure Investment and Jobs Act by a vote of 228–206.	President Biden delivers remarks about the October jobs report
Saturday, November 6	President Biden delivers remarks about the House passage of the Infrastructure Investment and Jobs Act.; A federal court in Louisiana, with the plaintiffs being Texas, Mississippi, Louisiana, South Carolina, and Utah, has blocked the Biden administrations vaccine mandate for employees.	President Biden delivers remarks about the House passing of the Infrastructure Investment and Jobs Act
Sunday, November 7		
Monday, November 8	The White House said that businesses should move forward with the vaccine mandate for workers, despite the court-ordered pause on Saturday.; President Biden welcomes the Milwaukee Bucks to the White House to celebrate their victory in the 2020–21 NBA season.; Karine Jean-Pierre, spokeswoman for the White House, said in a press meeting that the Army Corps of Engineers is replacing Line 5 of the oil and gas pipeline, which could potentially increase winter gas prices.; Representative Paul Gosar tweets an altered video of the intro of Attack on Titan with him depicted as a hero killing Alexandria Ocasio-Cortez and Biden, and calling for violence against migrants. It was met with immediate backlash, with people saying that he should be banned from Twitter. Ocasio-Cortez herself criticized the video, citing several instances of harassment she has faced on the job.	President Biden welcomes the Milwaukee Bucks to celebrate their championship victory President Biden with Bucks players Giannis and Thanasis Antetokounmpo
Tuesday, November 9	Vice President Harris arrives in France at the start of a European diplomatic tour.; Vice President Harris visits a COVID-19 lab at the Pasteur Institute.	
Wednesday, November 10	First Lady Jill Biden honors children of injured troops in her first solo event.; President Biden delivers remarks about the infrastructure victory and inflation prices at the Port of Baltimore.	President Biden delivers remarks about the infrastructure victory and inflation
Thursday, November 11	President Biden performs a wreath-laying ceremony at the Tomb of the Unknown Soldier at the Arlington National Cemetery and delivers the Veterans Day address at the Memorial Amphitheater.	President Biden lays the wreath at the Tomb of the Unknown Soldier. President Biden's short speech about Satchel Paige
Friday, November 12	The Negro Leagues Baseball Museum was honored by President Biden's mention of Satchel Paige in his Veterans Day speech.; President Biden briefly participates in the virtual APEC summit, hosted by New Zealand.; Jen Psaki returns to the White House after testing positive with COVID-19, saying that she tested negative on Thursday.	
Saturday, November 13		
Sunday, November 14		
Monday, November 15	President Biden celebrates and signs the Infrastructure Investment and Jobs Act into law.; President Biden holds a virtual bilateral meeting with Chinese leader Xi Jinping.	President Biden after signing the infrastructure bill into law President Biden and President Xi meet (first 10 minutes of hours long meeting)
Tuesday, November 16	President Biden promotes his infrastructure law on a snowy day at a bridge located in New Hampshire Route 175.	President Biden delivers remarks on his infrastructure law
Wednesday, November 17	The federal government auctions off oil leases from US-Mexico border for $190 million, despite Biden's promise during his campaign not to sell oil.	
Thursday, November 18	President Biden holds separate bilateral meetings with Canadian prime minister Justin Trudeau and Mexican president Andrés Manuel López Obrador at the White House.; President Biden attends the North American leaders's summit with Canadian prime minister Justin Trudeau and Mexican president Andrés Manuel López Obrador. This is the first time since the end of the Obama administration in 2016 when a US president has attended the meeting.	President Biden and Prime Minister Trudeau in a bilateral meeting President Biden hosts the North American Leaders' Summit, marking the first time since 2016 that a meeting ever happened at the summit President Biden with prime minister Trudeau and president Obrador
Friday, November 19	President Biden undergoes a colonoscopy under sedation at Bethesda Naval Hospital.; Vice President Harris becomes Acting President of the United States from 10:10 am to 11:35 am, under section 3 of the 25th Amendment, making her the first woman in American history to hold presidential power.; President Biden participates in the 2021 National Thanksgiving Turkey Presentation.	President Biden pardons the National Thanksgiving Turkey President Biden, chairman of the National Turkey Federation Phil Seger and turkey farmer Andrea Welp with pardoned turkey "Peanut Butter" during the ceremony
Saturday, November 20	President Biden celebrates his 79th birthday.	
Sunday, November 21		
Monday, November 22	President Biden condemns the Waukesha car rampage at a Christmas parade, where a SUV plowed into it, killing five people and injuring 48, as a "horrific act of violence". He also says that he's monitoring the situation very closely.; President Biden and First Lady Jill Biden travel to Fort Bragg to celebrate a "Friendsgiving" with military personnel and families.; First Lady Jill Biden welcomes the arrival of the 2021 White House Christmas tree.	President and First Lady Biden celebrate "Friendsgiving" at Fort Bragg Joe and Jill Biden serving an early Thanksgiving meal to military members and families First Lady Jill Biden welcomes the White House Christmas tree
Tuesday, November 23	President Biden signs H.R. 1510, which requires the United States Department of Veterans Affairs to report to Congress about the use of cameras in medical facilities, and S. 108, which authorizes the Seminole Tribe of Florida to convey interests in certain off-reservation land owned by them.; President Biden delivers remarks about easing U.S. oil reserves for refining them into gasoline and other energy products. He also delivers remarks about inflation, the biggest since 31 years ago.; President Biden stops by DC Central Kitchen to thank volunteers and help assemble meals for the community.	President Biden delivers remarks about the economy and lowering inflating gas prices President Biden and Vice President Harris assembling Thanksgiving meals at DC Central Kitchen
Wednesday, November 24	President Biden delivers remarks about the guilty verdict of the murder of Ahmaud Arbery trial.	
Thursday, November 25	President Biden celebrates Thanksgiving in Nantucket, Massachusetts, at the home of billionaire David Rubenstein.	
Friday, November 26	President Biden announces that, effective Monday November 29, the US would restrict travel from eight African countries due to concerns over the SARS-CoV-2 Omicron variant.	
Saturday, November 27		
Sunday, November 28	President Biden wishes Jewish people in the United States and around the world a Happy Hanukkah.	
Monday, November 29	President Biden delivers remarks about the Omicron variant.; First Lady Jill Biden unveils the Christmas decorations at the White House for the first time.	President Biden delivers remarks about the Omicron variant First Lady Jill Biden delivers remarks to White House holiday volunteers
Tuesday, November 30	President Biden signs four bills into law relating to military veterans.; Federal Judge Matthew T. Schelp rules that the federal centers for Medicaid and Medicare have no clear authority to enact the vaccine mandate, thus blocking it in 10 states.; President Biden delivers remarks about the Infrastructure Investment and Jobs Act at Dakota County Technical College in Minnesota.	President Biden signs bills that relates to military veteran needs into law. President Biden promoting the Infrastructure Investment and Jobs Act

=== December 2021 ===
Date	Events	Photos/videos
Wednesday, December 1	President Biden delivers remarks about the economy.; On the 33rd anniversary of World AIDS Day, President Biden delivers remarks about the administrations efforts to fight AIDS and HIV.	President Biden wearing the red ribbon on World AIDS Day
Thursday, December 2	President Biden visits the National Institutes of Health in Bethesda, Maryland and delivers remarks on the emerging Omicron variant.; President Biden and First Lady Jill Biden attend the National Christmas Tree Lighting outside of the White House.	President Biden delivers remarks at the National Institutes of Health President Biden and First Lady Jill Biden attend the National Christmas Tree Lighting
Friday, December 3	President Biden delivers remarks on the economy and job creation figures for November.; The Biden administration announced that it was consulting with Congress and allies on options to dissuading Russia from carrying out an attack on Ukraine.	President Biden delivers remarks about the November jobs report
Saturday, December 4		
Sunday, December 5	President Biden releases a statement on the death of former Kansas Senator Bob Dole.	
Monday, December 6	President Biden hosts the 44th Kennedy Center Honor Awards.; The Biden administration announces a diplomatic boycott against the 2022 Winter Olympics to protest human rights abuses in China.	President Biden hosts the 44th Kennedy Center Honor Rewards
Tuesday, December 7	President Biden and First Lady Jill Biden participate in the 80th anniversary of Pearl Harbor Attack.; President Biden speaks with Russian president Vladimir Putin.	President Biden and First Lady Jill Biden attend the Pearl Harbor Attack ceremony President Biden meets with Russian President Vladimir Putin
Wednesday, December 8	President Biden delivers remarks about the Infrastructure Investment and Jobs Act at Kansas City Area Transportation Authority in Missouri.	
Thursday, December 9	President Biden and congressional leaders pay respect to the late Bob Dole as his casket lies in state in the United States Capitol rotunda.; President Biden meets virtually with 100 world leaders in Day 1 of the Summit for Democracy.; President Biden speaks with Ukrainian president Volodymyr Zelenskyy.	President Biden and First Lady Jill Biden honor the late Bob Dole at the U.S. Capitol President Biden participates in the Summit for Democracy President Biden talks with Ukrainian President Zelenskyy on the phone
Friday, December 10	President Biden attends the funeral of former Kansas Senator Bob Dole at the Washington National Cathedral. Former president Bill Clinton was also in attendance.; President Biden hosts the 2nd and final day of the Summit for Democracy.; President Biden speaks with German Chancellor Olaf Scholz.; President Biden makes a virtual appearance on The Tonight Show with Jimmy Fallon.	President Biden delivers remarks on the final day of the Summit for Democracy President Biden calls new German Chancellor Olaf Scholz
Saturday, December 11	President Biden delivers remarks on the damage that was caused during the Tornado outbreak of December 10–11, pledging to send help to the areas affected.	President Biden delivers remarks about the tornado outbreak
Sunday, December 12		
Monday, December 13	President Biden and Senator Joe Manchin had a phone call about the senate vote for the Build Back Better Plan. According to a spokesperson for Manchin, he had a productive conversation with Biden and will talk in the following days. Before the meeting started, Manchin raised serious concern, citing the proposal's entirely relying on temporary programs.; President Biden signs an executive order that streamlines the process for social security and Medicare.	President Biden signs an executive order for streamlining social security and Medicare
Tuesday, December 14	President Biden delivers a proclamation on Bill of Rights Day.; President Biden marks nine years since the Sandy Hook Elementary School shooting by pointing to his administrations efforts to curb gun violence.; President Biden invites newly elected mayors from across the country to discuss infrastructure and the Build Back Better plan.	President Biden marks nine years since the Sandy Hook Elementary shooting President Biden reading materials in the Oval Office in preparation for his afternoon meetings
Wednesday, December 15	President Biden visited and surveyed damage from the Tornado outbreak of December 10–11, 2021 via an areal tour, then flew to Mayfield Graves County Airport in Mayfield, Kentucky via Marine One to receive a briefing from local leaders on the impacts of the 2021 Western Kentucky tornado.; The Biden Administration releases 1,500 previously classified documents relating to the Assassination of John F. Kennedy.	
Thursday, December 16	President Biden presents the Medal of Honor (2 posthumously) to Alwyn Cashe (the first African-American to be awarded since the Vietnam War), Christopher Celiz, and Earl Plumlee.; President Biden signs a debt celling increase into law.	President Biden awards the Medal of Honor to U.S. Army Master Sgt. Earl Plumlee during a ceremony in the East Room
Friday, December 17	President Biden delivers remarks about voting rights and police reforms at South Carolina State University.	
Saturday, December 18	President Biden visits St. Joseph on the Brandywine Church, where Naomi, Neilia, and Beau Biden are resting.	
Sunday, December 19	Senator Joe Manchin said that he would not support the economic and climate agenda of the Biden administration.	
Monday, December 20	President Biden announces a new puppy he adopted, named Commander.; President Biden tests negative for COVID-19 after being in close contact with a White House aide who was revealed to have tested positive in the morning.	President Biden preparing for an interview with ABC in isolation after coming into close contact with a Covid-positive aide. Biden would later test negative.
Tuesday, December 21	President Biden delivers remarks about the Omicron variant.	President Biden delivers remarks about plans to battle Omicron variant
Wednesday, December 22	The Biden administration extends payment pause for student loan borrowers until May 1.; President Biden is interviewed by David Muir mainly about the shortage in COVID-19 testing kits.	
Thursday, December 23	President Biden signs the Uyghur Forced Labor Prevention Act.	President Biden signs the Uyghur Forced Labor Prevention Act
Friday, December 24		
Saturday, December 25	President Biden celebrates the first Christmas Day of his administration.	President Biden and First Lady Jill Biden posing in front of a fireplace
Sunday, December 26		
Monday, December 27	President Biden attends a virtual meeting with several national governors, saying that the Omicron variant "should not be a source of panic".	
Tuesday, December 28	President Biden and Jill Biden take their new dog, Commander, on a walk near their second home in Rehoboth Beach, Delaware. Paparazzi of Washington press agents started taking pictures.; President Biden releases a statement on the death of former Nevada Senator Harry Reid.	
Wednesday, December 29		
Thursday, December 30	President Biden holds a phone call with Russian president Vladimir Putin to discuss rising tensions in Ukraine.; President Biden speaks with Chilean president-elect Gabriel Boric.	President Biden at Greenville, Delaware, where he spoke with Russian President Vladimir Putin
Friday, December 31	President Biden celebrates the first New Year's Day countdown of his administration.	

== See also ==
- First 100 days of the Biden presidency – Period from January to April 2021
- List of executive actions by Joe Biden
- Lists of presidential trips made by Joe Biden (international trips)
- Presidential transition of Joe Biden – Transfer of presidential power from Donald Trump to Joe Biden
- Timeline of the 2020 United States presidential election

U.S. presidential administration timelines
Preceded by Biden presidency (2021 Q3)	Biden presidency (2021 Q4)	Succeeded by Biden presidency (2022 Q1)
