= Timeline of the Joe Biden presidency (2021 Q3) =

The following is a timeline of the presidency of Joe Biden during the third quarter of 2021, from July 1 to September 30, 2021. For a complete itinerary of his travels, see List of presidential trips made by Joe Biden (2021). To navigate between quarters, see timeline of the Joe Biden presidency. For the Q4 timeline see timeline of the Joe Biden presidency (2021 Q4).

== Timeline ==
=== July 2021 ===
Date	Events	Photos/videos
Thursday, July 1	President Biden and First Lady Jill Biden visit Surfside, Florida to offer condolences to the victims of the Surfside condominium building collapse and their families.	
Friday, July 2	President Biden delivers remarks on the economy and job creation figures for June.; President Biden and Vice President Kamala Harris welcome the Los Angeles Dodgers to celebrate their victory in the 2020 World Series. They also received a custom made jersey from the team with their names and term numbers.	President Biden delivers remarks about the June jobs report President Biden and VP Harris with all of the Los Angeles Dodgers
Saturday, July 3		
Sunday, July 4	President Biden hosts his own 4 July party at the White House South Lawn and remarks about honoring the military and remarking about the work on the pandemic right as the Delta variant accounted for 25% of COVID-19 cases.	President Biden taking a selfie with visitors on Independence Day
Monday, July 5		
Tuesday, July 6	President Biden releases a written statement on the 6 month anniversary of the 2021 United States Capitol attack.; President Biden signs S.409 into law.	President Biden signs S.409
Wednesday, July 7	President Biden reacts to the assassination of the president of Haiti Jovenel Moïse condemning it as a "heinous attack". He also sent condolences and well wishes to the people of Haiti and First Lady Martine Moïse who was wounded in the attack.	
Thursday, July 8	President Biden announces that the official conclusion to the War in Afghanistan will be on August 31, 2021.	President Biden delivers remarks about the end of the War in Afghanistan President Biden answering questions after delivering the remarks on the War in Afghanistan
Friday, July 9	President Biden signs an executive order that promotes more competition in the economy.	
Saturday, July 10		
Sunday, July 11		
Monday, July 12		
Tuesday, July 13	President Biden decries Republican efforts for voter suppression asking "Have you no shame?".	President Biden remarks about voting rights at the National Constitution Center
Wednesday, July 14	Olivia Rodrigo arrives at the White House to participate in a COVID-19 vaccine campaign.	President Biden and Olivia Rodrigo
Thursday, July 15	President Biden holds a bilateral meeting and joint press conference with German Chancellor Angela Merkel at the White House.; President Biden signs a proclamation declaring July 16 National Atomic Veterans Day.	President Biden and German Chancellor Angela Merkel A Joint Press Conference between President Biden and German Chancellor Angela Merkel
Friday, July 16	President Biden participates in his first APEC summit as president, hosted virtually by New Zealand Prime Minister Jacinda Ardern.	President Biden and the rest of the world leaders participating APEC virtually
Saturday, July 17		
Sunday, July 18		
Monday, July 19	President Biden holds a bilateral meeting with King Abdullah II of Jordan at the White House.	President Biden with First Lady Jill Biden, Abdullah II of Jordan, Queen Rania of Jordan, and Hussein, Crown Prince of Jordan
Tuesday, July 20	President Biden welcomes the Tampa Bay Buccaneers to the White House to celebrate their victory in the Super Bowl LV. Biden received a custom made jersey from the team with his surname and presidency number.; The United States conducts a drone strike against Al-Shabaab militants near the Somalia town of Galkayo, making it the first military action in the country that was carried by the Biden administration.	President Biden with all of the Tampa Bay Buccaneers
Wednesday, July 21	President Biden attends a CNN town hall located in Cincinnati, Ohio hosted by Don Lemon.	President Biden and Don Lemon at the CNN Town Hall while Biden is talking to Americans
Thursday, July 22	President Biden signs the Crime Victims Fund Act.	The bill itself, with the signatures of President Biden and Speaker Pelosi.
Friday, July 23	U.S. ambassador to the UN Linda Thomas-Greenfield cuts her visit to Haiti short following gunshots at the funeral of assassinated Haitian President Jovenel Moïse.	
Saturday, July 24		
Sunday, July 25		
Monday, July 26	President Biden holds a bilateral meeting with Iraqi prime minister Mustafa Al-Kadhimi at the White House.	President Biden and Iraqi Prime Minister Mustafa Al-Kadhimi
Tuesday, July 27		
Wednesday, July 28	President Biden meets with Sviatlana Tsikhanouskaya, the main opposition candidate in the 2020 Belarusian presidential election.	President Biden with Sviatlana Tsikhanouskaya
Thursday, July 29	President Biden urges local governments to pay people for COVID-19 vaccinations.; President Biden refuses to extend the federal eviction moratorium from last September. The moratorium expired on July 31.	
Friday, July 30	A picture of President Biden holding a note handed to him from an aide saying "Sir, there is something on your chin." received viral media attention.	
Saturday, July 31		

=== August 2021 ===
Date	Events	Photos/videos
Sunday, August 1		
Monday, August 2	Two days after the federal moratorium for evictions expired, the Biden administration urged landlords to hold off on evictions and called on states and cities to make their own policies to keep renters in homes. President Biden has requested from the CDC a more scaled down pandemic-related moratorium, which they turned down citing a lack of legal authority.	
Tuesday, August 3	President Biden calls for New York Governor Andrew Cuomo to resign after an investigation corroborates sexual harassment allegations against him. Biden dodged a question of whether he should be impeached saying he was "taking things one step at a time to see how the situation would unfold."	
Wednesday, August 4	President Biden nominates Mark Brzezinski as United States ambassador to Poland pending Senate confirmation.	
Thursday, August 5	President Biden signs an executive order aiming for half of all new vehicles sold in 2030 to be electric. General Motors CEO Mary Barra and Ford CEO Jim Farley were in attendance;Tesla CEO Elon Musk was not.; President Biden honors members of the Capitol Police and the Washington Metropolitan Police Department who defended the U.S. Capitol on the morning of January 6 by signing legislation and awarding them Congressional Gold Medals and urging the country not to rewrite the history of the storming of the Capitol.	President Biden signing the legislation to award Congressional Gold Medals to police officers
Friday, August 6	President Biden delivers remarks on the economy and job creation figures for July.; President Biden begins a vacation in Wilmington, Delaware.	President Biden delivers remarks about the July jobs report
Saturday, August 7		
Sunday, August 8	President Biden sends B-52 bombers to attack the Taliban in Afghanistan after the terrorist group captured two major cities in the country on Saturday.	
Monday, August 9		
Tuesday, August 10	After the Senate passes the Infrastructure Investment and Jobs Act by a vote of 69–31, President Biden compares it to the passing of other landmark bills.	President Biden and Vice President Harris watch the American Jobs Plan being passed on C-SPAN.
Wednesday, August 11	President Biden's plan to spend two weeks in Wilmington was uplifted by the Senate and he spent the week at Camp David.	
Thursday, August 12		
Friday, August 13		
Saturday, August 14		
Sunday, August 15		
Monday, August 16	Cutting his stay at Camp David short, President Biden returns to Washington to address the nation on the Taliban takeover in Afghanistan. Biden says that he "stands squarely behind" the decision to withdraw from Afghanistan and admits that the collapse of their government was "quicker than anticipated".	President Biden delivers remarks on the Fall of Kabul, in which he met various criticism from both parties after.
Tuesday, August 17		
Wednesday, August 18	President Biden announces a mandate that requires staff from nursing homes to get fully vaccinated.; President Biden is interviewed by George Stephanopoulos, mainly talking about the evacuation of troops from Afghanistan.	President Biden gets interview by Stephanopoulos in the Roosevelt Room
Thursday, August 19		
Friday, August 20	President Biden addresses the nation for a second time this week regarding the evacuations from Afghanistan.	President Biden delivers remarks on the evacuations from Afghanistan
Saturday, August 21		
Sunday, August 22	President Biden says that American troops may remain in Afghanistan past the August 31 deadline. He also announced that 11,000 people have been evacuated in the past 36 hours.; Vice President Harris arrives in Singapore at the start of a Southeast Asia diplomatic tour.	Vice President Harris being welcomed in Singapore by Vivian Balakrishnan
Monday, August 23	President Biden pleas for employers to require vaccinations the day the CDC's announced full approval of the Pfizer and BioNTech's vaccine to people as young as 16 years old.; President Biden welcomes the Seattle Storm to the White House to celebrate their victory in the 2020 WNBA season. Biden received a custom made jersey from the team with his surname and presidency number.	President Biden with all of the Seattle Storm
Tuesday, August 24	Vice President Harris concludes a three-day trip in Singapore, where she continued her sharp rhetoric against Beijing and unveiled support for Vietnam. Harris' travel to Vietnam was initially delayed due to a possible case of Havana syndrome.; President Biden states that he will not extend the August 31st deadline for withdrawal of troops from Afghanistan.; The Supreme Court ruled that the Biden administration had to reinstate the Remain in Mexico policy.	
Wednesday, August 25	Vice President Harris arrives in Vietnam as part of a Southeast Asia diplomatic tour. During the meeting, Harris announced the launch of a new CDC office in the country.	
Thursday, August 26	President Biden addresses the nation following the death of 103 individuals including 13 United States service members in a series of terrorist attacks on the Hamid Karzai International Airport. He stated that evacuations will continue despite the terrorist attacks.	President Biden delivers remarks on the Kabul airport attack
Friday, August 27	President Biden holds a bilateral meeting with Israeli prime minister Naftali Bennett at the White House.	President Biden and Israeli Prime Minister Naftali Bennett
Saturday, August 28		
Sunday, August 29	President Biden and First Lady Jill Biden attend a dignified transfer of fallen troops at the Dover Air Force Base for the 13 service members killed in the 2021 Kabul airport attacks.	President Biden honors 13 fallen troops
Monday, August 30	The Department of Defense acknowledged a U.S. military drone strike targeting a vehicle carrying explosives in Kabul, Afghanistan.; General Frank McKenzie, the chief of U.S. Central Command, announces the last C-17s left Hamid Karzai International Airport around 3:29 p.m. Washington, D.C., time, leaving that facility and Afghanistan in possession of the Taliban.	
Tuesday, August 31	The United States Senate votes with unanimous consent to pass the Emergency Repatriation Assistance for Returning Americans Act, a bill that would boost emergency funding for Americans departing Afghanistan.; President Biden defends his decision to withdraw troops from Afghanistan in an address to the nation.	President Biden delivers remarks on the end of war in Afghanistan

=== September 2021 ===
Date	Events	Photos/videos
Wednesday, September 1	President Biden holds a bilateral meeting with Ukrainian president Volodymyr Zelenskyy at the White House.	President Biden and Ukrainian President Volodymyr Zelenskyy
Thursday, September 2	President Biden delivers remarks about the response efforts of Hurricane Ida.	
Friday, September 3	President Biden signs an executive order designating the declassification of documents related to the September 11 attacks.; President Biden delivers remarks on the economy and job creation figures for August.; President Biden visits Louisiana to survey the damage caused by Hurricane Ida.	President Biden delivers remarks about the August jobs report President Biden in Louisiana with Governor John Bel Edwards and Cedric Richmond
Saturday, September 4		
Sunday, September 5		
Monday, September 6		
Tuesday, September 7	President Biden delivers remarks about the climate change and Hurricane Ida after he surveyed the damage of the storm in neighborhoods in New York and New Jersey.	President Biden tours New Jersey and New York
Wednesday, September 8	Vice President Harris campaigns with California Governor Gavin Newsom in San Leandro ahead of the September 14 recall election.	
Thursday, September 9	President Biden announces "Path out of the Pandemic," a plan which includes new wide-ranging requirements for federal employees and employees of companies with more than 100 workers to receive the COVID-19 vaccine or undergo regular testing at least once a week, with no option of testing for unvaccinated federal employees.; President Biden speaks with China's leader Xi Jinping.	President Biden delivers remarks about the Path of the Pandemic
Friday, September 10		
Saturday, September 11	President Biden attends a memorial event at Ground Zero commemorating the 20th anniversary of the September 11 attacks. Former presidents Bill Clinton and Barack Obama were also in attendance.	From left to right: Bill Clinton, Hillary Clinton, Barack Obama, Michelle Obama, Joe Biden, Jill Biden.
Sunday, September 12		
Monday, September 13	President Biden campaigns with California Governor Gavin Newsom in Long Beach ahead of the September 14 recall election.; President Biden delivers remarks about the wildfire season, climate change, and the damage caused by the Caldor Fire in Lake Tahoe.	President Biden delivers remarks about climate change in Boise, Idaho
Tuesday, September 14	Secretary of State Antony Blinken defends Biden's withdrawal from Afghanistan, saying that Biden inherited a deadline from the previous administration, not the plan.	
Wednesday, September 15	President Biden holds a virtual trilateral meeting of the AUKUS with British prime minister Boris Johnson and Australian prime minister Scott Morrison to announce that the U.S. will share their nuclear submarine technology with Australia.; President Biden meets with the CEO's of The Walt Disney Company, Columbia Sportswear, Microsoft, Walgreens Boots Alliance, and Fox News, in an effort to get vaccines to employees.	A trilateral meeting of the AUKUS between President Biden with Prime Ministers of Australia and the United Kingdom President Biden hosts a meeting with CEO's of countless companies for the efforts of the "Path out of the Pandemic"
Thursday, September 16	U.S. District Court Judge Emmet G. Sullivan blocks the Biden administration from using Title 42, a Trump-era policy that authorized to expel migrant families from arriving at the U.S. southern border. The ruling took effect in 14 days.	
Friday, September 17	President Biden urges seven world leaders to follow a climate change policy that he says is good for the economy.	Antony Blinken, Joe Biden, and John Kerry deliver remarks about the economic climate change policy.
Saturday, September 18		
Sunday, September 19		
Monday, September 20	Jen Psaki responds to questioning about images of border patrol agents on horseback with reins chasing Haitian migrants in Del Rio, Texas.; The Biden administration announces an interagency plan to deal with effects of frequent extreme heat waves caused by global warming.; President Biden meets with U.N. Secretary General António Guterres.	President Biden and UN Secretary-General António Guterres
Tuesday, September 21	Alejandro Mayorkas says he will investigate reports of alleged abuse of Haitian immigrants.; President Biden delivers a speech at the General debate of the seventy-sixth session of the United Nations General Assembly.; President Biden meets with Australian prime minister Scott Morrison following the AUKUS deal and his speech to the United Nations General Assembly.; President Biden holds a bilateral meeting with British prime minister Boris Johnson at the White House.	President Biden addresses the United Nations General Assembly President Biden and Australian Prime Minister Scott Morrison President Biden and British Prime Minister Boris Johnson
Wednesday, September 22	President Biden announces at a COVID summit at the UN General Assembly that the US is doubling its purchase of Pfizer vaccines and the goal to get vaccines to 70% of the population by next year.; President Biden's approval rating drops to 43% while Vice President Harris' rating is 49%. Harris' rating matches with Biden's rating when he was vice president back in 2009.; Vice President Harris meets with British prime minister Boris Johnson a day after a meeting with President Biden.	President Biden delivers remarks at a COVID summit at the UN General Assembly
Thursday, September 23	The U.S. Environmental Protection Agency finalizes a rule that will phase out the use of Hydrofluorocarbon, an organic compound usually found in refrigerators.; Daniel Lewis Foote resigns as US Envoy to Haiti in protest of the inhumane treatment and expulsions of migrants from Haiti.; Jen Psaki announces that the horse patrols in Del Rio, Texas have been temporarily suspended.; Vice President Harris meets with Zambian president Hakainde Hichilema (making the first Zambian president to be in the White House since 1992), Ghanaian president Nana Akufo-Addo, and Indian prime minister Narendra Modi.	Vice President Harris meeting with Zambian president Hakainde Hichilema, making him the first president of Zambia to be in the White House since 1992 when George H. W. Bush was president.
Friday, September 24	President Biden holds a bilateral meeting with Indian prime minister Narendra Modi at the White House.; President Biden holds a meeting of the Quadrilateral Security Dialogue with Australian prime minister Scott Morrison, Indian prime minister Narendra Modi, and Japanese prime minister Yoshihide Suga. This marks the first quad meeting in the administration.; Vice President Harris gets interviewed in The View. Before the interview started, co-hosts Sunny Hostin and Ana Navarro were asked to leave the set since they tested positive for COVID-19. Harris was interviewed virtually with the remaining hosts.	President Biden and Indian Prime Minister Narendra Modi President Biden with prime ministers Suga, Modi and Morrison
Saturday, September 25	Vice President Harris holds a quad meeting with Australian prime minister Scott Morrison and Japanese prime minister Yoshihide Suga a day after a quad meeting with President Biden. Unlike Biden's quad meeting, Indian prime minister Narendra Modi skipped this one, presumably because he met her two days prior.	Vice President Harris meets with world leaders in quad meeting.
Sunday, September 26		
Monday, September 27	President Biden receives his COVID-19 booster shot in front of cameras and says he will press for more vaccine mandates and that unvaccinated people can cause an "awful lot of damage to this country".	President Biden delivers remarks and receives a COVID-19 booster shot
Tuesday, September 28	Top generals, including Frank McKenzie, told lawmakers under oath that they advised President Biden earlier in his presidency to keep several troops in Afghanistan.; President Biden opposes changing filibuster to raise or suspend the debt ceiling. Earlier that day, Treasury Secretary Janet Yellen warned congressional leaders that her department could run out of money by October 18.	
Wednesday, September 29		
Thursday, September 30	President Biden signs legislation that would extend funding for the U.S. government through December 3, thereby avoiding a government shutdown. Government funds were due to run out at midnight.	

== See also ==
- First 100 days of the Biden presidency – Period from January to April 2021
- List of executive actions by Joe Biden
- Lists of presidential trips made by Joe Biden (international trips)
- Presidential transition of Joe Biden – Transfer of presidential power from Donald Trump to Joe Biden
- Timeline of the 2020 United States presidential election

U.S. presidential administration timelines
Preceded by Biden presidency (2021 Q2)	Biden presidency (2021 Q3)	Succeeded by Biden presidency (2021 Q4)
