= Timeline of the Joe Biden presidency (2021 Q2) =

The following is a timeline of the presidency of Joe Biden during the second quarter of 2021, from April 1 to June 30, 2021. For a complete itinerary of his travels, see List of presidential trips made by Joe Biden (2021). To navigate between quarters, see timeline of the Joe Biden presidency. For the Q3 timeline see timeline of the Joe Biden presidency (2021 Q3).

== Timeline ==
=== April 2021 ===
Date	Events	Photos/videos
Thursday, April 1	President Biden holds the first meeting of his cabinet to discuss his infrastructure plan.	President Biden holds a cabinet meeting
Friday, April 2	President Biden speaks with Ukrainian president Volodymyr Zelenskyy to discuss the latter's anti-corruption efforts and reports of a Russian military build-up in eastern Ukraine.	President Biden delivers remarks about the March jobs report (transcript)
Saturday, April 3	President Biden orders an investigation into a car attack at a United States Capitol security checkpoint on Friday, which killed William Evans, a Capitol Police officer.	President Biden, Jen Psaki, Brian Deese and Ali Zaidi discuss the American Jobs Plan
Sunday, April 4	President Biden issues a presidential proclamation on the Days of Remembrance of the Victims of the Holocaust.	
Monday, April 5	President Biden delivers remarks about the tradition of Easter and continues the Easter Egg Roll tradition, albeit adapted to the ongoing pandemic.; President Biden reveals his plan to raise corporate taxes to 28%, which Democratic senator Joe Manchin threatened to block.	President Biden delivers remarks about the tradition of Easter (transcript)
Tuesday, April 6	President Biden announces that all adults should be eligible to receive COVID-19 vaccine appointments by April 19, 2021.	President Biden delivers remarks on the COVID-19 vaccination program (transcript)
Wednesday, April 7	President Biden speaks with King Abdullah II of Jordan.	President Biden speaks with Jordan's King Abdullah II on the telephone
Thursday, April 8	In an executive order, President Biden instructs the Department of Justice to draft a red flag law and propose rules on ghost guns and pistol stabilizing braces.	President Biden, Vice President Harris and Attorney General Merrick Garland deliver remarks on gun violence prevention Photo of Biden delivering remarks on gun control
Friday, April 9	President Biden offers his condolences on the death of Prince Philip, Duke of Edinburgh.; President Biden releases his presidential portrait, taken by Chief Official White House Photographer Adam Schultz.; President Biden creates the Presidential Commission on the Supreme Court of the United States, a nonpartisan commission to study the question of reforming the Supreme Court, such as by increasing the number of justices.	President Biden's official presidential portrait
Saturday, April 10		Cabinet members discuss the American Jobs Plan
Sunday, April 11		
Monday, April 12	President Biden discusses the American Jobs Plan with Democratic and Republican members of Congress.	President Biden and Vice President Harris discuss the American Jobs Plan with a bipartisan group of Members of Congress
Tuesday, April 13	President Biden and First Lady Jill Biden attend the viewing of remains of slain U.S. Capitol police officer William Evans at the U.S. Capitol.; President Biden speaks with Russian president Vladimir Putin to propose a summit meeting.	President Biden at a service honoring Officer William Evans
Wednesday, April 14	President Biden speaks with Afghan president Ashraf Ghani.; President Biden speaks with German Chancellor Angela Merkel.; President Biden formally announces the full withdrawal of American troops from Afghanistan by September 11, 2021, ending America's longest war.	President Biden delivers remarks on Afghanistan (transcript) Biden calls President Asraf Ghani
Thursday, April 15	President Biden announces sanctions on Russia over a cyber attack.; Joe and Jill Biden publish their tax returns.	President Biden delivers remarks on Russia (transcript)
Friday, April 16	President Biden holds a bilateral meeting and joint press conference with Japanese prime minister Yoshihide Suga at the White House. Suga is the first foreign leader to visit Biden since his inauguration.	President Biden and Japanese Prime Minister Yoshihide Suga A Joint Press Conference between President Biden and Japanese Prime Minister Yoshihide Suga
Saturday, April 17		President Biden speaks in a video call with Susie, a caregiver from Texas
Sunday, April 18		
Monday, April 19	President Biden releases a statement on the death of former vice president Walter Mondale.	Vice President Harris delivers remarks on the American Jobs Plan at Guilford Technical Community College in North Carolina
Tuesday, April 20	President Biden holds a national address hours after Derek Chauvin is found guilty of the murder of George Floyd.	President Biden and Vice President Harris deliver remarks on the verdict of Derek Chauvin's trial (transcript) President Biden, Second Gentleman Doug Emhoff, Vice President Harris, and First Lady Jill Biden in the Red Room after delivering remarks on the guilty verdict of Chauvin
Wednesday, April 21	President Biden offers to fly George Floyd's family to Washington as he promises police reform.; President Biden speaks with Canadian prime minister Justin Trudeau.	President Biden delivers remarks on COVID-19 and vaccinations
Thursday, April 22	President Biden meets with 40 world leaders in the 2021 Leaders Summit on Climate.	President Biden participates in the 2021 Leaders Summit on Climate
Friday, April 23	President Biden hosts the 2nd and final day of the 2021 Leaders Summit on Climate.	President Biden delivers remarks on the final day of the 2021 Leaders Summit on Climate
Saturday, April 24	President Biden becomes the first U.S. president to formally recognize the Ottoman killings of Armenians during World War I as genocide.	
Sunday, April 25		
Monday, April 26	President Biden speaks with Indian prime minister Narendra Modi.; President Biden signs an executive order establishing the White House Task Force on Worker Organising and Empowerment.	
Tuesday, April 27	President Biden delivers remarks on COVID-19 after an announcement by the CDC about wearing masks.	President Biden delivers remarks on COVID-19
Wednesday, April 28	President Biden unveils the American Families Plan.; President Biden delivers his first address before a joint session of the members of Congress, on the eve of his first 100 days in office.	President Biden delivers an address during a joint session of Congress (transcript)
Thursday, April 29	President Biden visits Duluth, Georgia, to mark the first 100 days of his administration.; President Biden and First Lady Jill Biden visit former president Jimmy Carter and former first lady Rosalynn Carter at their home in Plains, Georgia.	Video celebrating the first 100 days of the administration
Friday, April 30	President Biden visits Philadelphia to celebrate the 50th anniversary of Amtrak.; Biden offers condolences to the 45 victims of the 2021 Meron stampede by calling Israeli prime minister Benjamin Netanyahu	President Biden delivers remarks in Philadelphia

=== May 2021 ===
Date	Events	Photos/videos
Saturday, May 1		
Sunday, May 2		
Monday, May 3	First Lady Jill Biden and President Biden deliver remarks at Tidewater Community College.; President Biden raises the refugee admission limit to 62,500 after criticism.	President Biden delivers remarks in Portsmouth
Tuesday, May 4	President Biden announces that he plans to vaccinate 70% of American adults against COVID-19 by July 4.; President Biden speaks with Abu Dhabi Crown Prince Mohammed bin Zayed Al Nahyan.	President Biden delivers remarks on COVID-19 and vaccinations
Wednesday, May 5	President Biden declares May 5 as Missing and Murdered Indigenous Persons Awareness Day.	President Biden delivers remarks the American Rescue Plan
Thursday, May 6	President Biden delivers remarks promoting American Jobs Plan at Lake Charles, Louisiana.	President Biden delivers remarks on the American Jobs Plan
Friday, May 7	President Biden delivers remarks on the Economy and Job creation figures for April.	President Biden delivers remarks about the April jobs report
Saturday, May 8		
Sunday, May 9		
Monday, May 10	President Biden attends the online Bucharest Nine summit in Bucharest, Romania, hosted by President Klaus Iohannis.; The Department of Health and Human Services announces the enforcement of Section 1557 and Title IX, which prohibits sex discrimination.	
Tuesday, May 11	President Biden holds a bipartisan meeting with governors of the U.S.	President Biden meets with a bipartisan group of governors
Wednesday, May 12	Republicans tell President Biden in a meeting in the Oval Office that they're drawing a line to raise taxes to pay for infrastructure.; President Biden delivers remarks on the Colonial Pipeline, which he expects good news about it in the next 24 hours, and the COVID-19 vaccine and response program that is partnered with Uber and Lyft.	President Biden and Vice President Harris meet with congressional leaders in the Oval office. This ultimately led to the red line drawn by Republicans
Thursday, May 13	President Biden talks about the new CDC guideline that makes fully vaccinated people able to not wear masks.	
Friday, May 14		
Saturday, May 15	President Biden speaks with Israeli prime minister Benjamin Netanyahu and Palestinian Authority President Mahmoud Abbas regarding Gaza situation.	President Biden talking with Prime Minister Netanyahu on the phone
Sunday, May 16		
Monday, May 17	President Biden and Vice President Harris release their tax returns from 2020.; President Biden announces that he will share 20 million doses of the vaccine to the world in the following 6 weeks.; President Biden approves the sale of $735 million in precision-guided weapons to Israel.	President Biden delivers remarks on COVID-19 and vaccinations
Tuesday, May 18	President Biden tours the Ford Rouge Electric Vehicle Center ahead of the reveal of the F-150 Lightning.	President Biden visits Ford's Rouge Electric Vehicle Center
Wednesday, May 19	President Biden delivers remarks in the commencement speech at the U.S. Coast Guard Academy.	President Biden at the U.S. Coast Guard Academy's 140th Commencement Exercises
Thursday, May 20	President Biden signs the COVID-19 Hate Crimes Act.	President Biden delivers remarks and signs the COVID-19 Hate Crimes Act
Friday, May 21	President Biden holds a bilateral meeting and joint press conference with South Korean president Moon Jae-in at the White House. Moon is the second foreign leader to visit Biden since his inauguration.; At the press conference, he awards Korean War veteran Ralph Puckett the Medal of Honor for his bravery during the war.	President Biden and South Korean President Moon Jae-in A Joint Press Conference between President Biden and South Korean President Moon Jae-in President Biden awards Ralph Puckett the Medal of Honor
Saturday, May 22		
Sunday, May 23		
Monday, May 24	President Biden condemns the physical or verbal assaults against Jewish Americans caused by the 2021 Israel–Palestine crisis, despite over 500 Democrats who were former staffers for his campaign urging Biden to hold Israel responsible for the crisis.; President Biden and Anthony Fauci host a YouTube Town hall with famous YouTubers (Brave Wilderness, Manny MUA, and Jackie Aina) to promote vaccinations.; President Biden signs the Alaska Tourism Restoration Act into law.	President Biden signs the Alaska Tourism Restoration Act into law President Biden's YouTube Town Hall
Tuesday, May 25	The family of George Floyd meets with President Biden in a private conversation in the hopes of him signing the George Floyd Justice in Policing Act on the first anniversary of Floyd's murder, but Biden says he will sign it on a later date.	President Biden meets with the family of George Floyd
Wednesday, May 26	President Biden reveals that earlier in 2021, he ordered a closer intelligence review of two possible scenarios on the origin of COVID-19, including the theory that the virus escaped from a Wuhan lab.	
Thursday, May 27		
Friday, May 28	President Biden proposes a 6 trillion dollar budget plan.	
Saturday, May 29		
Sunday, May 30		
Monday, May 31	President Biden performs a wreath-laying ceremony at the Tomb of the Unknown Soldier at the Arlington National Cemetery and delivers the Memorial Day address at the Memorial Amphitheater.	President Biden, Vice President Harris and Secretary Austin at Arlington National Cemetery

=== June 2021 ===
Date	Events	Photos/videos
Tuesday, June 1	President Biden commemorates the 100th anniversary of the Tulsa race massacre by telling America to confront its past and cruel acts towards African-Americans in recent months.; The Biden administration officially revokes the "Remain in Mexico" policy set by the previous administration.; The Biden administration suspends oil drilling leases in the Arctic National Wildlife Refuge.	President Biden delivers remarks on the 100th anniversary of the Tulsa massacre
Wednesday, June 2	President Biden declares June "a national month of action" for people to get vaccinated by Independence Day.	
Thursday, June 3	President Biden announces an executive order that will come into effect by August 2 that will ban Americans investing into 59 Chinese firms, including Huawei. Before it was announced, China said it would retaliate against it.	
Friday, June 4	President Biden delivers remarks on the Economy and Job creation figures for May.; President Biden recognizes the 40th year of the AIDS epidemic.	President Biden delivers remarks about the May jobs report
Saturday, June 5		
Sunday, June 6	Vice President Harris arrives in Guatemala at the start of a Central America diplomatic tour.	Vice President Harris being welcomed in Guatemala
Monday, June 7	Vice President Harris arrives in Mexico as part of a Central America diplomatic tour.	
Tuesday, June 8	The Biden administration announces that they will target China with a new strike force to combat unfair trade practices.; President Biden ends infrastructure talks with the Republican senator group, led by Shelley Moore Capito.	
Wednesday, June 9	President Biden and First Lady Jill Biden depart Washington D.C. to the United Kingdom for the 2021 G7 summit in Cornwall and their first visit to Queen Elizabeth II.; President Biden addresses troops shortly after landing at RAF Mildenhall.	
Thursday, June 10	President Biden and First Lady Jill Biden meet with British prime minister Boris Johnson and his wife Carrie Johnson in Carbis Bay ahead of the G7 summit to be held the next day.	President Biden and British Prime Minister Boris Johnson
Friday, June 11	President Biden attends the 47th G7 summit in Carbis Bay.; President Biden meets Queen Elizabeth II earlier than expected when she showed up to the G7 summit reception at the Eden Project for a photo-op in the evening. They were originally scheduled to meet for the first time on June 13. Their meeting makes Biden the 13th incumbent US president the Queen has met during her reign.	President Biden and other world leaders at the 47th G7 summit
Saturday, June 12	President Biden holds a bilateral meeting with French president Emmanuel Macron.	
Sunday, June 13	President Biden and First Lady Jill Biden meet with Queen Elizabeth II at Windsor Castle.	President Biden and First Lady Jill Biden with Queen Elizabeth II at Windsor Castle.
Monday, June 14	President Biden attends NATO summit and meets with multiple world leaders as part of his 8-day tour in Europe.	
Tuesday, June 15	Biden meets with Vice President of Switzerland Ignazio Cassis.	
Wednesday, June 16	President Biden and Russian President Vladimir Putin participate in the summit at the Villa La Grange in Geneva, Switzerland.	President Biden and Russian President Vladimir Putin
Thursday, June 17	President Biden signs the bill making Juneteenth the eleventh federal holiday.	President Biden signs Juneteenth into law, making it the eleventh federal holiday
Friday, June 18		
Saturday, June 19		
Sunday, June 20		
Monday, June 21	President Biden extends the executive order that declares the nuclear plan by North Korea a national emergency for a year.	
Tuesday, June 22		
Wednesday, June 23	President Biden outlines and talks about his plans to curb gun violence crimes.	
Thursday, June 24	President Biden announces his support of a bipartisan infrastructure deal after meeting with both Republican and Democratic Party Senators at the White House.; President Biden visits Raleigh, North Carolina and speaks at a community center to encourage citizens to get the COVID-19 vaccine.	
Friday, June 25	President Biden holds a bilateral meeting with Afghan president Ashraf Ghani at the White House.; President Biden signs a law that designates the Pulse nightclub a National memorial site, on the fifth anniversary of the Orlando nightclub shooting.	President Biden and Afghan President Ashraf Ghani President Biden signs the law that designates the Pulse nightclub as a memorial ground.
Saturday, June 26		
Sunday, June 27	President Biden orders airstrikes in Syria which the military personnel launched in retaliation for drone attacks.	
Monday, June 28	President Biden holds a bilateral meeting with Israeli president Reuven Rivlin at the White House.	President Biden and Israeli President Reuven Rivlin
Tuesday, June 29		
Wednesday, June 30	President Biden nominates Amy Gutmann as the U.S. ambassador to Germany.; President Biden holds a virtual meeting with state governors.	

== See also ==
- First 100 days of the Biden presidency – Period from January to April 2021
- List of executive actions by Joe Biden
- Lists of presidential trips made by Joe Biden (international trips)
- Presidential transition of Joe Biden – Transfer of presidential power from Donald Trump to Joe Biden
- Timeline of the 2020 United States presidential election

U.S. presidential administration timelines
Preceded by Biden presidency (2021 Q1)	Biden presidency (2021 Q2)	Succeeded by Biden presidency (2021 Q3)
