= Timeline of the Joe Biden presidency =

List of lists of notable events relating to Joe Biden's presidency

Joe Biden, a Democrat from Delaware, was elected president of the United States on November 3, 2020. He was inaugurated on January 20, 2021, as the nation's 46th president, and his presidency ended on January 20, 2025, with the second inauguration of Donald Trump.

The following articles cover the timeline of Joe Biden, and the time leading up to it:

- Pre-presidency: 2019–2021
  - Joe Biden 2020 presidential campaign
  - Presidential transition of Joe Biden
- Presidency: 2021
  - First 100 days of the Biden presidency
  - Timeline of the Joe Biden presidency (2021 Q1)
  - Timeline of the Joe Biden presidency (2021 Q2)
  - Timeline of the Joe Biden presidency (2021 Q3)
  - Timeline of the Joe Biden presidency (2021 Q4)
- Presidency: 2022
  - Timeline of the Joe Biden presidency (2022 Q1)
  - Timeline of the Joe Biden presidency (2022 Q2)
  - Timeline of the Joe Biden presidency (2022 Q3)
  - Timeline of the Joe Biden presidency (2022 Q4)
- Presidency: 2023
  - Timeline of the Joe Biden presidency (2023 Q1)
  - Timeline of the Joe Biden presidency (2023 Q2)
  - Timeline of the Joe Biden presidency (2023 Q3)
  - Timeline of the Joe Biden presidency (2023 Q4)
- Presidency: 2024–2025
  - Timeline of the Joe Biden presidency (2024 Q1)
  - Timeline of the Joe Biden presidency (2024 Q2)
  - Timeline of the Joe Biden presidency (2024 Q3)
  - Timeline of the Joe Biden presidency (2024 Q4–January 2025)

== See also ==
- Timeline of the Donald Trump presidencies, for his predecessor and successor
