= Timeline of the Joe Biden presidency (2021 Q1) =

The following is a timeline of the presidency of Joe Biden during the first quarter of 2021, beginning from his inauguration as the 46th president of the United States on January 20, 2021, to March 31, 2021. For his time as president-elect, see the presidential transition of Joe Biden; for a detailed account of his first months in office, see First 100 days of the Biden presidency; for a complete itinerary of his travels, see List of presidential trips made by Joe Biden (2021). To navigate between quarters, see timeline of the Joe Biden presidency. For the Q2 timeline see timeline of the Joe Biden presidency (2021 Q2).

== Timeline ==
=== January 2021 ===
Date	Events	Photos/videos
Wednesday, January 20	Joe Biden takes the oath of office as the 46th president of the United States and Kamala Harris takes the oath of office as the 49th vice president. Outgoing president Trump does not attend the ceremony, though outgoing vice president Pence does attend.; President Biden proclaims a National Day of Unity.; President Biden rejoins the Paris Climate Agreement, from which the United States formally withdrew on November 4, 2020. The action took effect in 30 days.; In a letter to UN Secretary-General António Guterres, President Biden rescinds the United States' July 2020 intended withdrawal from the World Health Organization. Biden also names Anthony Fauci as the head of the United States' WHO delegation.; President Biden issues an executive order to revoke the Keystone XL Pipeline permit and overturn various other Trump administration environmental policies.; President Biden issues an executive order to halt funding for the Mexico–United States border wall.; President Biden issues a proclamation to repeal the travel ban from Muslim-majority countries.; The Senate confirms Avril Haines as Director of National Intelligence in a vote of 84–10.; President Biden directs the Department of Education to extend the pause on federal student loans through September 30, 2021.; Press Secretary Jen Psaki holds the first press briefing of the Biden administration, during which she mentions that the administration will hold briefings daily.	Joe Biden is inaugurated as the 46th president of the United States President Biden delivers his inaugural address
Thursday, January 21	President Biden signs ten executive orders related to the country's COVID-19 response and vaccination efforts. These include activating the Defense Production Act in order to speed up vaccine distribution.; Sources confirm that FBI Director Christopher Wray will remain in his position.; President Biden delivers remarks regarding his administration's planned COVID-19 response.; The House of Representatives votes 326–78 and the Senate votes 69–27 to pass H.R. 335, a waiver allowing Gen. Lloyd Austin to waive a law which forces retired generals to wait seven years before assuming office as secretary of defense.; Vice President Kamala Harris makes her first notable phone call as vice president with WHO director-general Tedros Adhanom Ghebreyesus.; President Biden fires National Labor Relations Board general counselor Peter B. Robb.; President Biden proposes to extend the New START nuclear treaty with Russia by 5 years. The treaty would have expired in February 2021.; President Biden announces a suspension on distribution of new oil and gas drilling permits, effective for 60 days.	President Biden signs the executive orders for COVID-19 testing
Friday, January 22	The Senate confirms Lloyd Austin as secretary of defense in a vote of 93–2.; President Biden signs an executive order to ask agencies to boost food aid and improve the delivery of stimulus checks.; President Biden signs an executive order to restore collective bargaining power for federal workers.; President Biden signs an executive order to increase the minimum wage for federal employees to $15 per hour.; President Biden discusses plans with Canadian prime minister Justin Trudeau.; President Biden discusses plans with Mexican president Andrés López.	President Biden signs H.R. 335 into law, thus allowing Lloyd Austin to become Secretary of Defense. President Biden signs the executive orders for Economic Relief of the COVID-19 pandemic
Saturday, January 23	President Biden speaks with British prime minister Boris Johnson.	President Biden talks with UK Prime Minister Boris Johnson on the phone
Sunday, January 24	President Biden speaks with French president Emmanuel Macron.	
Monday, January 25	President Biden signs an executive order to repeal Department of Defense Instruction 1300.28, which effectively banned transgender individuals from joining the U.S. military under the Trump administration.; President Biden imposes travel restrictions on South Africa, the United Kingdom, and Brazil to mitigate the spread of newly identified COVID-19 strains.; The Senate confirms Janet Yellen as Secretary of the Treasury in a vote of 84–15.; The House of Representatives brings the impeachment charge against former president Donald Trump to the Senate, with the trial scheduled to start February 9.; President Biden signs an executive order to increase government buying from U.S. manufacturers. The order will likely take 45 days or more to get approved by the federal government.; President Biden speaks with German Chancellor Angela Merkel.	President Biden signs the executive order named "Made in America"
Tuesday, January 26	The Senate confirms Antony Blinken as secretary of state in a vote of 78–22.; President Biden speaks with Russian president Vladimir Putin.; President Biden signs executive orders relating to racism (xenophobia against Asian Americans due to the COVID-19 pandemic; ending Department of Justice contracts with private prisons due to the growing number of incarcerated African Americans; discriminatory housing rules) and for the relationships of Indian and Alaska Native Tribal Nations. Prior to the signing, domestic policy adviser Susan Rice held her first White House press conference, discussing the executive actions.; Acting United States Attorney General Monty Wilkinson announces that Biden has rescinded the Trump administration's zero-tolerance policy, which led to the separation of over 3,000 migrant families on the Mexico–United States border.; President Biden orders 200 million doses of the COVID-19 vaccine to be distributed by the end of August.; President Biden speaks with NATO Secretary General Jens Stoltenberg.; Vice President Harris receives her second shot of the Moderna COVID-19 vaccine at the National Institutes of Health (NIH) in Bethesda, Maryland. She gave remarks about the efficacy of the vaccine.	President Biden signs the executive orders related to racial equity President Biden speaks with NATO Secretary General Jens Stoltenberg Vice President Harris receives her second COVID-19 vaccination at the NIH
Wednesday, January 27	The White House COVID-19 Response Team holds its first weekly public briefing featuring Anthony Fauci, Marcella Nunez-Smith, Jeff Zients, Andy Slavitt and Rochelle Walensky.; The White House focuses on climate change, with President Biden signing an executive action to suspend new natural gas and oil development leases on federal lands and waters. Special Climate Envoy John Kerry and White House National Climate Advisor Gina McCarthy participated in their first press conference, discussing the administration's climate policies.; Vice President Harris swears in Antony Blinken as secretary of state.; President Biden speaks with Japanese prime minister Yoshihide Suga.	President Biden signs the executive orders related to climate change Vice President Harris swears in Antony Blinken
Thursday, January 28	President Biden signs executive orders expanding the Affordable Care Act and Medicaid, revoking an abortion policy by the Trump administration, and revoking the Mexico City policy.; Second Gentleman Douglas Emhoff had his first solo event, visiting an urban farm in Washington, D.C. He gave remarks about food insecurity being exacerbated during the pandemic.	President Biden signs the executive orders related to health care
Friday, January 29	President Biden meets with two wounded soldiers at Walter Reed National Military Medical Center.	President Biden visits Walter Reed
Saturday, January 30		
Sunday, January 31	President Biden writes a letter to Nancy Pelosi and Patrick Leahy proposing the withdrawals of 73 proposed rescissions by Congress.	

=== February 2021 ===
Date	Events	Photos/videos
Monday, February 1	President Biden threatens sanctions on Myanmar in response to a coup.; Acting Solicitor General Elizabeth Prelogar asked the Supreme Court to remove two cases related to Trump administration policy: Biden v. Sierra Club and Pekoske v. Innovation Law Lab.; President Biden and Vice President Harris meet with ten Republican senators in the Oval Office to negotiate a deal on a coronavirus aid package.; Vice President Harris speaks with Canadian prime minister Justin Trudeau.	President Biden meets with Republican senators to discuss COVID-19 relief measures
Tuesday, February 2	The Senate confirms Pete Buttigieg as secretary of transportation in a vote of 86–13.; The Senate confirms Alejandro Mayorkas as Secretary of Homeland Security in a vote of 56–43.; President Biden signs three immigration-related executive orders: creating a task force to reunite children separated from their families as a result of the Trump administration family separation policy; an order to review legal immigration programs, including Remain in Mexico and the Central American Minors Program; and a review of immigration policies for "integration and inclusion" including the naturalization process.; White House COVID-19 coordinator Jeffrey Zients announced the administration would ship almost 1 million doses to 6,500 pharmacies across the country to increase vaccine availability.; President Biden and First Lady Jill Biden attend the viewing of remains of slain U.S. Capitol police officer Brian Sicknick at the U.S. Capitol.	President Biden signs executive orders related to immigration President Biden and First Lady Jill Biden attend the memorial for Capitol police officer Brian Sicknick
Wednesday, February 3	Vice President Harris and Second Gentleman Douglas Emhoff attend the viewing of the remains of U.S. Capitol police officer Brian Sicknick at the U.S. Capitol.; Vice President Harris swears in Pete Buttigieg as 19th secretary of transportation and Alejandro Mayorkas as 7th secretary of homeland security.; President Biden and Vice President Harris meet with ten Democratic senators in the Oval Office to negotiate a deal on a coronavirus aid package.; President Biden speaks with South Korean president Moon Jae-in.; President Biden speaks with Australian prime minister Scott Morrison.	Vice President Harris swears in Alejandro Mayorkas President Biden meets with Democratic senators to discuss COVID-19 relief measures
Thursday, February 4	President Biden signs an executive order to increase refugee admissions and allow a safe haven for about 125,000 refugees.; President Biden signs three memoranda; one on LGBTQ rights, one on renewing the National Security Council (NSC), and one on revitalizing America's foreign worker policy.; President Biden makes his first visit to the State Department headquarters as president, delivering remarks to employees.	President Biden delivers remarks to State Department employees
Friday, February 5	The Senate passes a budget resolution as a step to approve President Biden's $1.9 trillion stimulus package but rejects the minimum wage package he proposed. Additionally, Vice President Kamala Harris casts her first tiebreaking vote as vice president.; President Biden and Vice President Harris meet with Democratic House leaders in the Oval Office to negotiate a deal on a coronavirus aid package.	President Biden meets with Democratic House leaders to discuss COVID-19 relief measures
Saturday, February 6		
Sunday, February 7	President Biden and First Lady Jill Biden deliver a video message during Super Bowl LV to thank frontline health workers and offer a moment of silence to the victims of the COVID-19 pandemic in the United States.; President Biden releases a statement on the death of former secretary of state George Shultz.	First Lady Jill Biden and Biden family dog Major prepare to record a Super Bowl LV video message
Monday, February 8	President Biden speaks with Indian prime minister Narendra Modi.; Secretary of State Antony Blinken announces that the administration will reengage with the United Nations Human Rights Council.; The Senate confirms Denis McDonough as secretary of veterans affairs in a vote of 87–7.	President Biden and Vice President Harris virtually tour the State Farm Stadium vaccination center
Tuesday, February 9	Vice President Kamala Harris swears in Denis McDonough as Secretary of Veterans Affairs.	Vice President Harris swears in Denis McDonough
Wednesday, February 10	President Biden announces sanctions on the military leaders who directed the coup in Myanmar.; President Biden makes his first visit to the Defense Department headquarters as president, delivering remarks to employees.; President Biden speaks with Chinese leader Xi Jinping.	President Biden delivers remarks in the response to the Myanmar coup d'état
Thursday, February 11	President Biden visits the National Institutes of Health and delivers an address to the staff, declaring that there will be enough vaccines for 300 million Americans by the end of July. He also announces that the United States has signed contracts with Pfizer and Moderna for 200 million more COVID-19 vaccine doses.	President Biden delivers remarks to the staff at the National Institutes of Health
Friday, February 12	President Biden announces a review of closing of the U.S. military prison at Guantanamo Bay in Cuba by the end of his term.; President Biden, First Lady Jill Biden and their granddaughters depart Washington to spend Presidents Day weekend at Camp David, in his first visit there as president.	President Biden and First Lady Jill Biden deliver a Lunar New Year message from the Red Room
Saturday, February 13	White House Deputy Press Secretary TJ Ducklo resigns from his position after being suspended the previous day over comments he made towards a female journalist. His departure marks the first resignation of the Biden administration.; President Biden reacts to the Senate acquittal of former president Donald Trump by saying that "democracy is fragile".	
Sunday, February 14	President Biden speaks on the third anniversary of the Stoneman Douglas High School shooting, in Parkland, Florida, and calls on Congress to strengthen gun control laws.	
Monday, February 15	President Biden and his family return to Washington from Camp David.; Vice President Harris speaks with French president Emmanuel Macron.	President Biden delivers a Presidents Day message
Tuesday, February 16	President Biden extends the foreclosure ban and mortgage forbearance through the end of June in an effort to address the economic impact of the COVID-19 pandemic.; White House Press secretary Jen Psaki states that the administration will "recalibrate" relations with Saudi Arabia, which means that President Biden will only engage with King Salman and not Crown Prince Mohammed bin Salman, the country's de facto ruler.; President Biden attends a CNN town hall located in Milwaukee, Wisconsin hosted by Anderson Cooper.	President Biden and Anderson Cooper at the CNN Town Hall while Biden is talking to Americans
Wednesday, February 17	President Biden speaks with Israeli Prime Minister Benjamin Netanyahu.	President Biden discusses his proposed American Rescue Plan with labor leaders in the Oval Office
Thursday, February 18	President Biden's immigration reform bill is introduced in the House of Representatives. If passed, the bill would create a path to citizenship for undocumented immigrants, increase funding for immigration courts and enhance border security, among smaller changes.; Tribal Nation leaders pressure President Biden and White House to speak on issues the tribal nations are facing such as poverty, poor healthcare and other basic issues they are facing.; President Biden and Vice President Harris congratulate NASA for landing its rover Perseverance.	President Biden watches Perseverance land on Mars
Friday, February 19	President Biden participates in his first G7 summit as president, hosted virtually by British prime minister Boris Johnson.; President Biden delivers remarks to the Munich Security Conference in which he affirmed the United States's commitment to the Transatlantic partnership and stated the "United States is determined to re-engage with Europe."; President Biden pledges $2 billion for the COVAX program under WHO.	President Biden participates in a virtual G7 summit from the White House Situation Room
Saturday, February 20	President Biden declares a major disaster in Texas arising from the severe frost conditions, clearing the way for more federal funds to be spent on relief efforts.; President Biden visits his friend and former Kansas senator Bob Dole, following Dole's recent stage four lung cancer diagnosis.	
Sunday, February 21		
Monday, February 22	President Biden holds a moment of silence outside the White House to commemorate the 500,000 Americans who have died from COVID-19.; President Biden ends the use of a more difficult version of the English language and civics test required to acquire American citizenship which was introduced by the Trump administration in December 2020, reverting the test back to the 2008 version.	President Biden speaks and holds a moment of silence to commemorate American deaths from COVID-19
Tuesday, February 23	The Senate confirms Linda Thomas-Greenfield as United States ambassador to the United Nations in a vote of 78–20.; The Senate confirms Tom Vilsack as Secretary of Agriculture in a vote of 92–7.; President Biden holds a virtual bilateral meeting and joint press conference with Canadian prime minister Justin Trudeau, to discuss COVID-19, economic recovery, climate change, and refugees and migration.; President Biden speaks with Iraqi prime minister Mustafa Al-Kadhimi.	A virtual joint press conference between President Biden and Canadian Prime Minister Justin Trudeau
Wednesday, February 24	President Biden reverses a ban on the issue of permanent residency green cards to immigrants implemented by former president Donald Trump.; Vice President Harris swears in Linda Thomas-Greenfield as United States ambassador to the United Nations and Tom Vilsack as secretary of agriculture.	Vice President Harris virtually swears in Tom Vilsack
Thursday, February 25	The Senate confirms Jennifer Granholm as Secretary of Energy in a vote of 64–35. Vice President Harris swears her in.; President Biden participates in an event commemorating the 50 millionth COVID-19 vaccine shot.; President Biden attends the Winter Meeting of the National Governors Association.; President Biden speaks with King Salman of Saudi Arabia and Kenyan President Uhuru Kenyatta.; President Biden approves a retaliatory military strike against Iranian-backed militia in Syria, which leaves 17 militants dead.	Vice President Harris swears in Jennifer Granholm President Biden takes part in an event commemorating the 50 millionth COVID-19 vaccine shot
Friday, February 26	Vice President Harris speaks with Danish prime minister Mette Frederiksen.; Vice President Harris speaks with Democratic Republic of the Congo President Felix Tshisekedi.; President Biden travels to Houston, Texas.	The White House Black History Month celebration (note: a copyrighted performance by Anthony Hamilton has been edited out)
Saturday, February 27	After debating it through Friday night, the House passes the $1.9 trillion American Rescue Plan Act by a vote of 220–211, in the early morning.	President Biden gives remarks on the passage of the American Rescue Plan Act through the House (transcript)
Sunday, February 28	President Biden speaks in favor of workers at an Amazon warehouse in Bessemer, Alabama, as they conduct a vote considering unionization, saying that employers should use "no intimidation, no coercion, no threats, no anti-union propaganda."	President Biden discusses workers and unionization

=== March 2021 ===
Date	Events	Photos/videos
Monday, March 1	President Biden holds a virtual bilateral meeting with Mexican president Andrés Manuel López Obrador, to discuss migration, COVID-19 and economic and security cooperation.; The Senate confirms Miguel Cardona as secretary of education in a vote of 64–33.	A virtual bilateral meeting between President Biden and Mexican President Andrés Manuel López Obrador
Tuesday, March 2	The Senate confirms Gina Raimondo as Secretary of Commerce in a vote of 84–15.; The Senate confirms Cecilia Rouse as Chair of the Council of Economic Advisers in a vote of 95–4.; President Biden says that the United States government expects to take delivery of enough COVID-19 vaccine for all Americans adult by the end of May 2021.; President Biden withdraws his nomination of Neera Tanden as Director of the Office of Management and Budget following controversy.; Vice President Harris speaks with Australian prime minister Scott Morrison.; Vice President Harris swears in Miguel Cardona as secretary of education.	President Biden delivers remarks on the COVID-19 pandemic (transcript)
Wednesday, March 3	Vice President Harris swears in Gina Raimondo as Secretary of Commerce.; President Biden criticizes "Neanderthal thinking" in reference to the lifting of mask mandates by the governors of Texas and Mississippi.; President Biden pledges deeper cooperation and ties with Indo-Pacific nations and to stand against Chinese influence in the region.; Biden's official presidential portrait is taken on this day.	President Biden participates in a virtual House Democratic Caucus event
Thursday, March 4	President Biden speaks with Guatemalan President Alejandro Giammattei.; Vice President Harris speaks with Israeli prime minister Benjamin Netanyahu.	Vice President Harris speaks with Prime Minister Benjamin Netanyahu of Israel on the telephone
Friday, March 5	President Biden imposes sanctions on Myanmar's Ministry of Defence and Ministry of Home Affairs, following the recent military coup.	President Biden takes part in a roundtable meeting about the American Rescue Plan Act
Saturday, March 6	After debating it through Friday night, the Senate passes the $1.9 trillion American Rescue Plan Act by a vote of 50–49, in the early morning.	President Biden gives remarks on the passage of the American Rescue Plan Act through the Senate (transcript)
Sunday, March 7	President Biden signs an executive order promoting voting rights.; Defense secretary Lloyd Austin warns foreign enemies and says that the administration will continue to protect American troops and interests following an attack on American troops in Iraq.	President Biden signs an executive order promoting voting rights
Monday, March 8	President Biden signs two executive orders relating to gender equality; one on creating a Gender Policy Council and another on directing the Department of Education to review Title IX changes made by previous administration.; President Biden appoints Jacqueline Van Ovost to lead the U.S. Transportation Command and Laura J. Richardson to lead the U.S. Southern Command.	President Biden delivers remarks on International Women's Day Biden and Harris pose with female generals of the U.S. Armed Forces.
Tuesday, March 9	President Biden grants temporary protected status (TPS) to Venezuelan immigrants.	President Biden visits a store which has received a loan under the Paycheck Protection Program
Wednesday, March 10	The House approves the $1.9 trillion American Rescue Plan by a vote of 220–211.; The Senate confirms Marcia Fudge as Secretary of Housing and Urban Development in a vote of 66–34. Vice President Harris swears her in.; The Senate confirms Merrick Garland as Attorney General in a vote of 70–30.; The Senate confirms Michael S. Regan as Administrator of the Environmental Protection Agency in a vote of 66–34.	Vice President Harris virtually swears in Marcia Fudge
Thursday, March 11	President Biden signs the American Rescue Plan into law.; Vice President Harris swears in Merrick Garland as Attorney General.; President Biden addresses the nation on television marking the first anniversary of the COVID-19 pandemic. During the address, Biden announces that all American adults will be eligible to receive a COVID-19 vaccination by May 1, 2021.	President Biden signs the American Rescue plan President Biden addresses the nation on the first anniversary of the COVID-19 pandemic (transcript)
Friday, March 12	President Biden holds a virtual meeting of the Quadrilateral Security Dialogue with Australian prime minister Scott Morrison, Indian prime minister Narendra Modi, and Japanese prime minister Yoshihide Suga.; Vice President Harris swears in Cecilia Rouse as the chair of the Council of Economic Advisers.; President Biden and Vice President Harris celebrate the American Rescue Plan with House Speaker Nancy Pelosi and Senate Majority Leader Chuck Schumer.; Vice President Harris swears in Michael S. Regan as Administrator of the Environmental Protection Agency.	A quadrilateral meeting between President Biden with Prime Ministers of Australia, India, and Japan President Biden and Vice President Harris delivers remarks on the American Rescue Plan
Saturday, March 13		
Sunday, March 14		
Monday, March 15	The Senate confirms Deb Haaland as Secretary of Interior in a vote of 51–40.	President Biden delivers remarks on the American Rescue Plan (transcript)
Tuesday, March 16	The Senate confirms Isabel Guzman as the 27th Administrator of the Small Business Administration in a vote of 81–17.; Vice President Harris swears in Deb Haaland as Secretary of the Interior.; President Biden travels to Chester, Pennsylvania as part of his "Help is Here" tour.	Vice President Harris delivers remarks to the 65th Session of the United Nations Commission on the Status of Women
Wednesday, March 17	The Senate confirms Katherine Tai as the 19th United States Trade Representative in a vote of 98–0.; President Biden holds a virtual bilateral meeting with Taoiseach Micheál Martin of Ireland at the White House.; In an interview with ABC News, President Biden calls Russian president Vladimir Putin "a killer" and claimed he "would pay the price" for election interference.	A virtual bilateral meeting between President Biden and Taoiseach Micheál Martin
Thursday, March 18	Russian president Vladimir Putin responds negatively to President Biden's claim that he is a "violent killer". Shortly before this, Biden had commented suggesting that he has no interest in repairing relations with Russia.; 21 states file lawsuits against President Biden seeking to undo his rescinding of the Keystone XL Pipeline permit.; The Senate confirms Xavier Becerra as Secretary of Health and Human Services in a vote of 50–49.; Vice President Harris swears in Katherine Tai as United States Trade Representative.	President Biden delivers remarks on the COVID-19 vaccination program (transcript)
Friday, March 19	President Biden stumbles three times while trying to climb the stairs on Air Force One.; President Biden and Vice President Harris travel to Atlanta, Georgia to meet with Asian American leaders.; Former Florida senator and former astronaut Bill Nelson is nominated as Administrator of NASA.	President Biden delivers remarks in Atlanta, Georgia on the recent spa shootings there and the American Rescue Plan (transcript)
Saturday, March 20		
Sunday, March 21		
Monday, March 22	The Senate confirms Marty Walsh as Secretary of Labor in a vote of 68–29.; Vice President Harris swears in Isabel Guzman as Administrator of the Small Business Administration.	Vice President Harris swears in Isabel Guzman
Tuesday, March 23	Vice President Harris swears in Marty Walsh as Secretary of Labor.; President Biden travels to Columbus to celebrate the 11th anniversary of the Affordable Care Act.	President Biden delivers remarks on the Boulder shooting (transcript)
Wednesday, March 24	US women's national soccer team players Megan Rapinoe and Margaret Purce join President Biden and the First Lady to mark Equal Pay Day.; Vice President Harris is given the task of reducing the number of unaccompanied minors and asylum seekers at the border with Mexico. She will lead negotiations with Mexico, El Salvador, Guatemala and Honduras.	Margaret Purce takes a selfie with Megan Rapinoe, President Biden and First Lady Jill Biden
Thursday, March 25	President Biden holds his first press conference, during which he confirms his intention to run for re-election in the 2024 presidential election.	President Biden holding his first press conference (transcript)
Friday, March 26	Vice President Harris swears in Xavier Becerra as Secretary of Health and Human Services.; President Biden invites forty world leaders including Chinese leader Xi Jinping and Russian president Vladimir Putin to a virtual climate summit held on April 22 and April 23.	Vice President Harris swears in Xavier Becerra
Saturday, March 27		
Sunday, March 28		
Monday, March 29	President Biden and First Lady Jill Biden participate in the Vietnam War Veterans Day.	President Biden delivers remarks on COVID-19 and vaccinations (transcript)
Tuesday, March 30	President Biden signs the PPP Extension Act of 2021, a bill that would extend the Paycheck Protection Program deadline from March 31 to May 31.	President Biden signs the Paycheck Protection Program into law
Wednesday, March 31	President Biden declares March 31 as International Transgender Day of Visibility, aiming to celebrate the achievements of trans rights activists and increase awareness about ongoing challenges faced by transgender and gender-nonconforming people.; President Biden introduces the American Jobs Plan during a speech in Pittsburgh, Pennsylvania.	President Biden delivers remarks on his economic plans in Pittsburgh

== See also ==
- First 100 days of the Biden presidency – Period from January to April 2021
- List of executive actions by Joe Biden
- Lists of presidential trips made by Joe Biden (international trips)
- Presidential transition of Joe Biden – Transfer of presidential power from Donald Trump to Joe Biden
- Timeline of the 2020 United States presidential election

U.S. presidential administration timelines
Preceded by First Trump presidency (2020 Q4–January 2021)	Biden presidency (2021 Q1)	Succeeded by Biden presidency (2021 Q2)
