= Timeline of the Joe Biden presidency (2022 Q2) =

The following is a timeline of the presidency of Joe Biden during the second quarter of 2022, from April 1 to June 30, 2022. For a complete itinerary of his travels, see List of presidential trips made by Joe Biden (2022). To navigate between quarters, see timeline of the Joe Biden presidency. For the Q3 timeline see timeline of the Joe Biden presidency (2022 Q3).

== Timeline ==
=== April 2022 ===
Date	Events	Photos/videos
Friday, April 1	President Biden promises to send more aid to Ukraine.	
Saturday, April 2	President Biden and First Lady Jill Biden attend the commissioning ceremony for USS Delaware (SSN-791) at the Port of Wilmington in Delaware.	President Biden and First Lady Jill Biden with crew members of USS Delaware
Sunday, April 3		
Monday, April 4		
Tuesday, April 5	President Biden orders national research of the long term effects of COVID-19.; Former President Barack Obama visits the White House to mark the 12th anniversary of the Affordable Care Act. It was the first time for Obama to visit the White House since leaving office at the end of his presidency in January 2017.; President Biden signs Executive Order 14070, which expands the Affordable Care Act.	President Biden and Vice President Harris with former president Barack Obama
Wednesday, April 6	President Biden signs the Postal Service Reform Act of 2022 into law.	President Biden after signing the Postal Service Reform Act
Thursday, April 7	The Senate confirms Ketanji Brown Jackson as an Associate Justice of the Supreme Court in a vote of 53–47.	President Biden and Jackson watch her Senate confirmation
Friday, April 8	President Biden announces six actions against gun violence, including asking the Department of Justice to regulate ghost guns.; President Biden signs Jackson's Supreme Court commission, despite the fact she can't work until Justice Stephen Breyer retires in June 2022.	President Biden signs Jackson's Supreme Court commission President Biden delivers remarks upon Jackson's confirmation
Saturday, April 9		
Sunday, April 10		
Monday, April 11	President Biden holds a virtual bilateral meeting with Indian Prime Minister Narendra Modi.	President Biden meets with Indian Prime Minister Narendra Modi
Tuesday, April 12	President Biden calls Russia's war in Ukraine following the invasion of Ukraine a "genocide".	
Wednesday, April 13	President Biden speaks with Ukrainian president Volodymyr Zelenskyy, which they discussed the invasion of Ukraine. He then announced that the government authorized an additional $800 million to security assistance in Ukraine.	President Biden speaks with Ukrainian president Zelenskyy
Thursday, April 14	President Biden urges Congress to pass the Bipartisan Innovation Act while at his visit in the North Carolina Agricultural and Technical State University.; President Biden says that top U.S. officials are deciding that whether or not to send a senior official in Kyiv to show support for Ukraine.	President Biden visits the North Carolina Agricultural and Technical State University
Friday, April 15	Vice President Harris holds a meeting with Tanzanian President Samia Suluhu Hassan.; President Biden remarks about Russia and the sanctions.	Vice President Harris holds a bilateral meeting with Tanzanian President Samia Hassan
Saturday, April 16		
Sunday, April 17		
Monday, April 18	President Biden and First Lady Jill Biden host the White House Easter Egg Roll with Jimmy Fallon and Kristin Chenoweth as guests.	President Biden and First Lady Jill Biden attend the White House Easter Egg Roll
Tuesday, April 19	President Biden signs the Save the Liberty Theater Act of 2021 and the Shadow Wolves Enhancement Act into law.; President Biden visits Portsmouth Harbor in New Hampshire and delivers remarks about the Infrastructure Investment and Jobs Act.	President Biden signs the Shadow Wolves Enhancement Act
Wednesday, April 20		
Thursday, April 21	President Biden holds a bilateral meeting with Ukrainian Prime Minister Denys Shmyhal at the White House to announce an additional $800 million in military assistance to Ukraine.	President Biden and Ukrainian Prime Minister Denys Shmyhal
Friday, April 22	President Biden reveals a plan to protect old-growth forests on Earth Day at Seward Park in Seattle.	President Biden signs an executive order on Earth Day
Saturday, April 23		
Sunday, April 24		
Monday, April 25	President Biden welcomes the Tampa Bay Lightning to the White House to celebrate their victory in the 2020 and 2021 Stanley Cup seasons.	President Biden celebrates the Tampa Bay Lightning victory
Tuesday, April 26	President Biden grants three pardons and 75 commutations, his first actions on clemency.	
Wednesday, April 27	President Biden attends the funeral of former Secretary of State Madeleine Albright at the Washington National Cathedral. Former presidents Bill Clinton and Barack Obama were also in attendance.	President Biden gives a speech at Albright's funeral
Thursday, April 28	President Biden says he is considering student loan forgiveness, but less than $50,000 per borrower.; President Biden proposes a $33 billion bill in support of Ukraine.	President Biden delivers remarks on Ukraine
Friday, April 29		
Saturday, April 30	President Biden attends the White House Correspondents' Association Dinner, hosted by Trevor Noah. In his speech he roasted Donald Trump, Kevin McCarthy, Fox News, Meet the Press, Joe Manchin and Kyrsten Sinema, and the anti-woke movement.	

=== May 2022 ===
Date	Events	Photos/videos
Sunday, May 1	President Biden gave remarks at the Memorial Service for Walter Mondale, 42nd Vice President of the United States.	President Biden delivers remarks at the memorial service of Vice President Walter Mondale
Monday, May 2		
Tuesday, May 3	President Biden criticizes the leaked Supreme Court draft opinion of Dobbs vs. Jackson Women's Health Organization.	
Wednesday, May 4	During remarks at the White House, President Biden referred to former President Trump's Make America Great Again movement, saying, "This MAGA crowd is really the most extreme political organization that's existed in American history, in recent American history."	
Thursday, May 5	President Biden held a meeting with 39 national labor leaders, including representatives from the Amazon Labor Union and the Starbucks New York City Roastery.	President Biden meets with glasswork worker organizers
Friday, May 6	President Biden issues a proclamation for Military Spouse Appreciation Day.; First Lady Jill Biden goes on a solo trip in Romania and Slovakia to support Ukraine refugees and U.S. troops.; President Biden takes a trip in Ohio and announces that five major companies will join in an agreement to boost their reliance on 3D printing manufacturing.	President Biden delivers remarks in Ohio
Saturday, May 7		
Sunday, May 8		
Monday, May 9	President Biden announces that he reached an agreement with twenty internet providers to lower the cost of broadband speeds through the Infrastructure Investment and Jobs Act.; President Biden signs the Ukraine Democracy Defense Lend-Lease Act of 2022 into law.	President Biden delivers remarks on internet connectivity President Biden signs the Defense Lend-Lease Act into law
Tuesday, May 10	President Biden holds a bilateral meeting with Italian Prime Minister Mario Draghi at the White House.	President Biden and Italian prime minister Mario Draghi
Wednesday, May 11	During a Democratic fundraiser in Chicago, President Biden called his predecessor, former president Donald Trump, "the great MAGA king", and criticized Republicans months before the 2022 United States elections.	
Thursday, May 12	President Biden ordered flags lowered to half-staff to honor the Americans who have died from COVID-19 as the United States death toll nears 1 million.; President Biden hosts ASEAN leaders at the White House as part of the U.S.-ASEAN special summit.	President Biden and ASEAN leaders
Friday, May 13	President Biden holds a bilateral meeting with King Abdullah II of Jordan at the White House.	President Biden and King Abdullah II of Jordan
Saturday, May 14		
Sunday, May 15		
Monday, May 16	President Biden holds bilateral meeting with Greek Prime Minister Kyriakos Mitsotakis at the White House.	President Biden and Greek Prime Minister Kyriakos Mitsotakis
Tuesday, May 17	President Biden visits Buffalo, New York, and mourns the deaths of the victims in the recent mass shooting there.	President Biden delivers remarks about the 2022 Buffalo shooting
Wednesday, May 18	President Biden invokes the Defense Production Act to speed baby formula shipments. He also created "Operation Fly Formula", which provides commercial airplanes from the Defense Department to distributors to pick up some baby formula.	President Biden invokes the Defense Production Act to speed baby formula shipments.
Thursday, May 19	President Biden holds a trilateral meeting and joint press conference with Finnish President Sauli Niinistö and Swedish Prime Minister Magdalena Andersson at the White House.	Presidents Biden with Finnish President Sauli Niinistö and Swedish Prime Minister Magdalena Andersson
Friday, May 20	A federal judge in Louisiana named Robert R. Summerhays blocked the Biden administration from lifting Title 42.; President Biden arrives in Seoul, South Korea. Before he arrived, two secret service agents were arrested, one of them was drunk and he assaulted a South Korean citizen.	President Biden visits Samsung Electronics
Saturday, May 21	President Biden holds a joint press conference with South Korean President Yoon Suk-yeol at People's House. Immediately after the meeting was over, North Korea test-fired three ballistic missiles.	President Biden and South Korean president Yoon Suk-yeol
Sunday, May 22	President Biden arrives in Tokyo, Japan.	
Monday, May 23	President Biden meets with Emperor Naruhito at the Tokyo Imperial Palace.; President Biden holds a joint press conference with Japanese Prime Minister Fumio Kishida at the Akasaka Palace.; President Biden launches the Indo-Pacific Economic Framework with 13 countries signing up, including India, Japan, and South Korea.	President Biden and Emperor Naruhito President Biden and Japanese prime Minister Fumio Kishida
Tuesday, May 24	President Biden attends the QUAD Leaders Summit with Australian Prime Minister Anthony Albanese, Indian Prime Minister Narendra Modi, and Japanese Prime Minister Fumio Kishida to discuss worldwide issues.; Following the Robb Elementary School shooting, President Biden addresses the nation.	President Biden with prime ministers Albanese, Kishida and Modi President Biden addresses the nation following the Robb Elementary School shooting
Wednesday, May 25	President Biden signs Executive Order 14074 two years after the murder of George Floyd that reforms federal police policies and establishes a database of police misconduct. The executive order serves as a replacement for the George Floyd Justice in Policing Act.	President Biden signs Executive Order 14074
Thursday, May 26	USDA secretary Tom Vilsack announced that the administration will bring in new rules that will "strengthen the American food supply chain, promote fair and competitive markets, and prevent abuse of farmers from poultry processers".	
Friday, May 27	A White House spokesperson said that the plans on forgiving students loans that the media was reporting was inaccurate and that no one paid anything for student loans since Biden took office.; President Biden salutes the 2022 graduates of the United States Naval Academy and remarks about various problems.	President Biden at the U.S. Naval Academy commencement ceremony
Saturday, May 28		
Sunday, May 29	President Biden and First Lady Jill Biden visit Uvalde, Texas to honor those who were shot in the Robb Elementary School shooting.	President Biden at Robb Elementary School in Ulvade
Monday, May 30	President Biden performs a wreath-laying ceremony at the Tomb of the Unknown Soldier at the Arlington National Cemetery and delivers the Memorial Day address at the Memorial Amphitheater.	President Biden, Vice President Harris and Secretary Austin at Arlington National Cemetery
Tuesday, May 31	President Biden holds a bilateral meeting with New Zealand Prime Minister Jacinda Ardern at the White House.; President Biden, in a New York Times opinion piece, announces that he'll provide more rocket power to Ukraine.; South Korean boyband BTS attends a White House press meeting with Press Secretary Karine Jean-Pierre, drawing in a massive spike in viewers on social media in the process.; President Biden met with South-Korean boy band BTS to discuss efforts of combating Asian hate crimes.	President Biden and New Zealand prime minister Jacinda Ardern BTS attends White House press conference with Karine Jean-Pierre President Biden meeting with BTS

=== June 2022 ===
Date	Events	Photos/videos
Wednesday, June 1	President Biden meets with baby formula manufacturers in light of the recent shortage. He also remarked about how he wasn't briefed about the shortage until April and that manufacturing is being delayed for another two months.	
Thursday, June 2	In an address to the nation, President Biden calls on Congress to pass a federal assault weapons ban, a high-capacity magazine ban, red flag laws and other legislation.	President Biden delivers remarks on gun violence
Friday, June 3	President Biden delivers remarks about the May jobs report.	President Biden delivers remarks about the May Jobs Report
Saturday, June 4		
Sunday, June 5		
Monday, June 6	Transportation Secretary Pete Buttigieg tests positive for COVID-19.; The Wall Street Journal publishes information that President Biden won't come up with a decision for student loan forgiveness until July or August.	
Tuesday, June 7	President Biden signs four bipartisan bills into law that honor war veterans lifetime achievements.	President Biden signs veterans health care bills
Wednesday, June 8	The House of Representatives pass the Protecting Our Kids Act at a vote of 223–204, which limits the access to guns.; President Biden arrives in Los Angeles for the 9th Summit of the Americas, with him being greeted by Governor Gavin Newsom and Mayor Eric Garcetti.; President Biden gets interviewed on Jimmy Kimmel Live!.	President Biden appearing on “Jimmy Kimmel Live!”
Thursday, June 9	President Biden announces that the administration is restoring communication between the Palestinians that had been canceled by the Trump Administration through the Palestinian Affairs Unit.; On the second day of the 9th summit of the Americas, President Biden meets with the Prime Minister of Canada Justin Trudeau, President of Brazil Jair Bolsonaro, and many more leaders and CEOs, including the CEO of Alphabet Inc. Sundar Pichai.	President Biden delivers remarks at the 9th Summit of the Americas President Biden meets with Justin Trudeau
Friday, June 10	The Biden administration announces that it will no longer require travelers to test negative for COVID-19 in order to come in the United States. The order took effect at 12:01 am on Sunday.; The Biden administration scraps a proposal from the Trump administration that would paint Air Force One to the colors of the American flag. This plan was scrapped due to engineering and budgetary issues.	President Biden at the 9th Summit of the Americas
Saturday, June 11	President Biden receives a briefing on the New Mexico wildfires at a state emergency operation center. He announced that the federal government will pay for emergency response and debris removal in full.	President Biden receives a briefing on New Mexico wildfires
Sunday, June 12		
Monday, June 13	President Biden signs the "Commission To Study the Potential Creation of a National Museum of Asian Pacific American History and Culture Act" and the "Congressional Passage of Ocean Shipping Reform Act" into law.	
Tuesday, June 14	President Biden attends the AFL–CIO convention, praising unions and criticizing Republicans.	Biden at the AFL-CIO convention
Wednesday, June 15	President Biden sends a letter to several oil refiners to produce more gasoline and diesel in a letter in order to stop the rising inflation of it.; President Biden announces that the United States will send an additional $1 billion aid to Ukraine.	
Thursday, June 16	In a rare press interview with the AP, President Biden commented on the nation's mood after the COVID-19 pandemic, saying the American people are "really, really down" and he mentioned the need for mental health services, "has skyrocketed because people have seen everything upset".; President Biden also stated that a recession is "not inevitable", and "Secondly, we're in a stronger position than any nation in the world to overcome this inflation."	
Friday, June 17		
Saturday, June 18	During a morning bicycle ride on a Rehoboth Beach, Delaware bike path, the president fell when he stopped to greet supporters wishing him happy Father's Day. When asked if he was OK, the president replied, "I'm good."	
Sunday, June 19	President Biden delivers remarks on commemorating Juneteenth.	
Monday, June 20	President Biden tells reporters that he will soon make a decision on suspending the federal tax on gasoline while heading from Rehoboth Beach to the White House.	
Tuesday, June 21	President Biden speaks to reporters at the Major Economies Forum on Energy and Climate. At the forum, when asked about the letter sent by Cheveron CEO Mike Wirth, he said "He's mildly sensitive. I didn't know they'd get their feelings hurt that quickly."	
Wednesday, June 22	President Biden calls on Congress to suspend federal gasoline and diesel taxes for three months.	
Thursday, June 23	President Biden states he is "deeply disappointed by the Supreme Court's ruling in New York State Rifle & Pistol Association, Inc. v. Bruen." He added that the ruling "contradicts common sense and the Constitution, and should deeply trouble us all."; President Biden meets with 11 state governors in the Roosevelt Room about speeding up the growth of the offshore wind industry. Notably, Biden accidentally showed a cue card which had extremely simple commands.	President Biden meeting with 11 state governors about the growth of the offshore wind industry
Friday, June 24	President Biden addresses the nation on the Supreme Court ruling over the landmark case of Dobbs v. Jackson Women's Health Organization, in which Roe v. Wade (1973) and Planned Parenthood v. Casey (1992), which had guaranteed abortion as a legal right nationwide, were overturned.	President Biden addresses the nation on Dobbs v. Jackson Women's Health Organization
Saturday, June 25	President Biden signs a bipartisan firearm bill into law that prevents dangerous people from accessing them.; President Biden arrives at Franz-Josef-Strauß Airport in Munich for the G7 summit and is greeted by Bavarian Minister-President Markus Söder.	President Biden and the Minister-President of Bavaria at Munich Airport
Sunday, June 26	German Chancellor Olaf Scholz welcomes President Biden in the Bavarian Alps ahead of the G7 summit and holds a bilateral meeting with him.; President Biden attends the 48th G7 summit at Schloss Elmau in Krün.; President Biden announces that the G7 nations will ban imports of Russian gold.; President Biden and other G7 leaders launch the Partnership for Global Infrastructure and Investment.	President Biden meets with Chancellor Scholz at Schloss Elmau G7 leaders at the 48th G7 summit
Monday, June 27	The G7 leaders hold a virtual meeting with Ukrainian President Volodymyr Zelenskyy on day 2 of the G7 summit and issue a statement pledging to stand with Ukraine. Afterwards, the G7 leaders met with guests from G7 partner countries and international organizations to discuss climate, health and food security among other topics.; President Biden holds bilateral meetings with Japanese Prime Minister Fumio Kishida and Senegalese President Macky Sall at the G7 summit.	G7 leaders speaking with Ukrainian President Zelenskyy G7 leaders meeting with invited guests
Tuesday, June 28	The Biden administration announces that over 296,000 doses of the monkeypox vaccine will be distributed to combat the monkeypox outbreak, including 56,000 doses of the Jynneos vaccine.; President Biden arrives in Madrid, Spain and meets with Prime Minister Pedro Sánchez and King Felipe VI.	President Biden and King Felipe VI of Spain Group photo of NATO leaders before a dinner at Royal Palace of Madrid
Wednesday, June 29	Justice Stephen Breyer, in a letter to President Biden, said that his retirement would be effective on June 30 at noon.; President Biden announces that all federal workers will be required to prove their COVID-19 vaccine status.; President Biden attends the 32nd NATO Summit at IFEMA.; President Biden meets with Turkish President Recep Tayyip Erdoğan.; President Biden meets with Japanese prime minister Fumio Kishida and South Korean president Yoon Suk-yeol.	President Biden and NATO leaders President Biden and Turkish President Recep Tayyip Erdoğan
Thursday, June 30	President Biden delivers remarks at a press conference in Spain, during the final day of the NATO conference.; After Stephen Breyer's retirement became effective, President Biden's nominee Ketanji Brown Jackson was sworn in as the Supreme Court Justice, making her the first black woman to do so.; In a 5-4 opinion written by Chief Justice John Roberts in the cases of Biden v. Texas, the Supreme Court rejected arguments by Republican led states that forced officials to keep the Remain in Mexico policy, and that it did not violate the Illegal Immigration Reform and Immigrant Responsibility Act of 1996, thus clearing the way for the administration to end the policy.	Biden delivers remarks at a press conference in Spain during the final day of the NATO conference Jackson sworn in by Breyer

== See also ==
- First 100 days of the Biden presidency – Period from January to April 2021
- List of executive actions by Joe Biden
- Lists of presidential trips made by Joe Biden (international trips)
- Presidential transition of Joe Biden – Transfer of presidential power from Donald Trump to Joe Biden
- Timeline of the 2020 United States presidential election

U.S. presidential administration timelines
Preceded by Biden presidency (2022 Q1)	Biden presidency (2022 Q2)	Succeeded by Biden presidency (2022 Q3)
