= 2021 Joe Biden speech to a joint session of Congress =

Speech by US President Joe Biden

- Full video of the speech as published by the White House
- Date: April 28, 2021
- Time: 9:00 p.m. EDT
- Duration: 1 hour, 5 minutes
- Venue: House Chamber, United States Capitol
- Location: Washington, D.C.; 38°53′19.8″N 77°00′32.8″W
- Type: Unofficial State of the Union Address
- Participants: Joe Biden; Kamala Harris; Nancy Pelosi
- Footage: C-SPAN
- Previous: 2020 State of the Union Address
- Next: 2022 State of the Union Address
- Website: Full text by Archives.gov

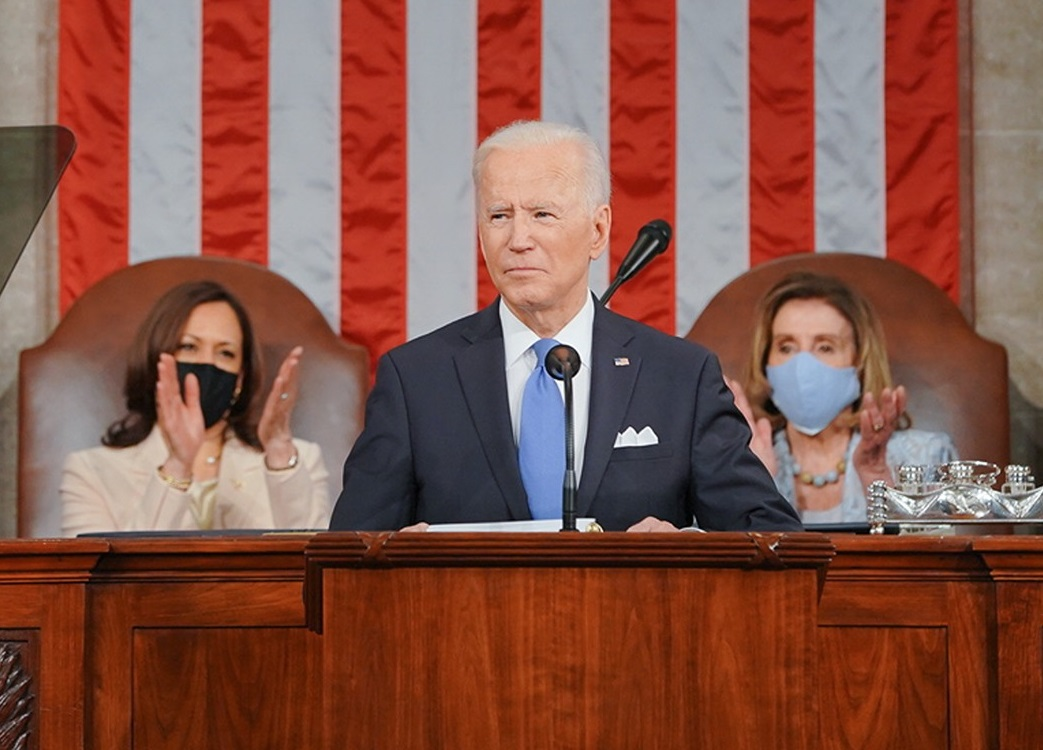
President Joe Biden addressing the Congress, with Vice President Kamala Harris and House Speaker Nancy Pelosi.

Joe Biden, the 46th president of the United States, addressed a joint session of the United States Congress on April 28, 2021, the eve of his 100th day in office. It was his first public address before a joint session. Like a State of the Union Address, it was delivered before the 117th United States Congress in the Chamber of the House of Representatives in the United States Capitol. Presiding over this joint session was the House speaker, Nancy Pelosi, accompanied by Kamala Harris, the vice president in her capacity as the president of the Senate. It was the first time in the U.S. history that two women and two Californians presided over an address to Congress, seated on the rostrum behind the president.

== Background ==
Speaker Pelosi invited Biden to address a joint session on April 13, 2021, asking him to "share [his] vision for addressing the challenges and opportunities" of the time. Biden delivered his speech on the 99th day of his presidency amidst the ongoing COVID-19 pandemic and economic recovery, campaign to vaccinate Americans, ratification of the American Rescue Plan, Democratic efforts to advance legislation on infrastructure, guns, social justice, and voting rights, Derek Chauvin's conviction in the murder of George Floyd, and planned withdrawal of U.S. forces from Afghanistan.

=== Security and public health measures ===
The joint session was designated a National Special Security Event due to an ongoing security threat to Congress that began with the U.S. Capitol attack in January 2021. Due to the ongoing COVID-19 pandemic, face covering requirements and social distancing were used to protect attendees, and members of Congress were not allowed to invite guests, breaking with tradition. Measures were coordinated by the House Sergeant of Arms and Attending Physician. A limited number of members of Congress were in attendance; overall, 200 people were gathered in the House Chamber. No designated survivor was chosen because Cabinet members watched the address remotely.

== Speech ==
Biden's address centered on his plans to expand the size and scope of the federal government to create blue-collar jobs, raise the federal minimum wage to $15 per hour, reduce economic inequality, and invest in early childhood education, community colleges, infrastructure, research, and technology in the fight against climate change. He cited the COVID-19 economic recovery and vaccination campaign as successes during his first 100 days in office.

Biden used the word "jobs" 43 times during the speech. He proposed the American Families Plan, a US$1.8 trillion package that includes new spending on child care, education, and paid leave. He asserted that autocratic adversaries, such as Chinese Communist Party leader Xi Jinping, see political divisiveness among Americans as "proof that the sun is setting on American democracy" and that America is "too riven by hostility to effectively govern." On racial justice, he declared that Congress should pass the George Floyd Justice in Policing Act, to eliminate systemic racism in housing, education and public health. Biden declared that the "forever war in Afghanistan" will end with the withdrawal of U.S. forces.

== Response ==
=== Republican Party ===
Republican Senator Tim Scott delivered the party's formal rebuttal to Biden's joint address to Congress.

=== Working Families Party ===
Rep. Jamaal Bowman delivered the progressive response to Biden's joint address to Congress.

== Viewership ==
Biden's speech, total cable and network viewers

Network	Viewers
ABC	4,025,000
MSNBC	3,941,000
NBC	3,542,000
CBS	3,367,000
CNN	3,180,000
FNC	2,920,000
Fox	1,630,000

Scott's response, total cable and network viewers

Network	Viewers
FNC	3,197,000
ABC	2,897,000
MSNBC	2,725,000
NBC	2,469,000
CBS	2,311,000
CNN	2,080,000

Broadcast networks Cable news networks

== See also ==
- First 100 days of the Biden presidency – Period from January to April 2021
- List of joint sessions of the United States Congress
- Timeline of the Joe Biden presidency (2021 Q2)

Preceded by 2020 State of the Union Address	State of the Union addresses 2021 joint session speech	Succeeded by 2022 State of the Union Address
