= Timeline of the Joe Biden presidency (2022 Q1) =

The following is a timeline of the presidency of Joe Biden during the first quarter of 2022, from January 1 to March 31, 2022. For a complete itinerary of his travels, see List of presidential trips made by Joe Biden (2022). To navigate between quarters, see timeline of the Joe Biden presidency. For the Q2 timeline see timeline of the Joe Biden presidency (2022 Q2).

== Timeline ==
=== January 2022 ===
Date	Events	Photos/videos
Saturday, January 1	Joe Biden begins his first full year as President	
Sunday, January 2		
Monday, January 3		
Tuesday, January 4		
Wednesday, January 5		
Thursday, January 6	President Biden and Vice-president Harris give speeches in Statuary Hall of the United States Capitol on the first anniversary of the January 6 United States Capitol attack.	President Biden delivers remarks on the first anniversary of the January 6 United States Capitol attack.
Friday, January 7	President Biden travelled to see the aftermath of the recent Colorado wildfire and met with those impacted.	President Biden in a town-hall following the Colorado wildfires.
Saturday, January 8	President Biden spoke at the memorial service of former majority leader, Nevada senator Harry Reid.	President Biden at the memorial service of Harry Reid
Sunday, January 9		
Monday, January 10		
Tuesday, January 11	President Biden calls for the John Lewis Voting Rights Act to be passed and for the filibuster rules to be changed.	President Biden speaking in Georgia to promote the John Lewis Voting Rights Act.
Wednesday, January 12		
Thursday, January 13	President Biden met with the Senate Democratic Caucus on Capitol Hill to discuss the passage of the John Lewis Voting Rights Act and filibuster reform.; The Supreme Court of the United States blocks President Biden's workplace COVID-19 vaccine mandate in a 6–3 majority.	President Biden speaks at a meeting of the Senate Democratic Caucus.
Friday, January 14		
Saturday, January 15		
Sunday, January 16		
Monday, January 17	President Biden gives a speech for Martin Luther King Jr. Day.	
Tuesday, January 18		
Wednesday, January 19	During a news conference, President Biden talks about the Russo-Ukrainian crisis and mentions the possibility of a "minor incursion" by Russia.	President Biden at a news conference
Thursday, January 20	President Biden completes his first year in office.; Following criticism by Ukrainian president Volodymyr Zelenskyy and foreign minister Dmytro Kuleba on President Biden's comments he made Wednesday, Biden and press secretary Jen Psaki say Russian units moving across the Ukrainian border would be an invasion and would result in an economic response.	
Friday, January 21	President Biden holds a virtual bilateral meeting with Japanese prime minister Fumio Kishida.	President Biden meets with Japanese Prime Minister Fumio Kishida
Saturday, January 22		
Sunday, January 23		
Monday, January 24		
Tuesday, January 25		
Wednesday, January 26		
Thursday, January 27	President Biden holds a bilateral meeting with Norwegian prime minister Jonas Gahr Støre at the White House.; Senior Supreme Court Justice Stephen Breyer announces his retirement from the Supreme Court, effective June 2022.	President Biden and Norwegian prime minister Jonas Gahr Støre Justice Stephen Breyer announces his retirement with President Biden.
Friday, January 28	During a trip originally meant for touting the Infrastructure Investment and Jobs Act, President Biden visits the site of the collapse of the Fern Hollow Bridge in Pittsburgh before giving a speech, promising to rebuild that bridge and thousands of other ones elsewhere.	President Biden at the Fern Hollow Bridge
Saturday, January 29		
Sunday, January 30		
Monday, January 31	President Biden holds a bilateral meeting with Emir Tamim bin Hamad Al Thani of Qatar at the White House.; The Biden administration said that it began deporting Venezuelan migrants to Colombia without a chance to seek asylum after entering the United States from Mexico.	President Biden and Emir Tamim bin Hamad Al Thani of Qatar

=== February 2022 ===
Date	Events	Photos/videos
Tuesday, February 1	President Biden hosts senators Dick Durbin and Chuck Grassley in the White House to discuss filling the vacancy in the Supreme Court of the United States being left by retiring Justice Stephen Breyer.	President Biden greets Senator Chuck Grassley
Wednesday, February 2	President Biden announces that he would be sending approximately 2,000 troops from Fort Bragg, North Carolina, to Poland and Germany in early February and sending part of an infantry Stryker squadron of about 1,000 troops based in Germany to Romania.	
Thursday, February 3	President Biden confirms that ISIS leader Abu Ibrahim al-Hashimi al-Qurashi detonated an explosive vest in a confrontation with American troops in northwest Syria, killing himself and 12 other people, including members of his own family.	President Biden announces the death of ISIS leader Abu Ibrahim al-Hashimi al-Qurashi
Friday, February 4	President Biden delivers remarks on the January 2022 jobs report, highlighting that 6.6 million jobs have been added since January 2021.; President Biden signs an executive order requiring the use of project labor agreement's in federal construction contracts that cost more than $35 million.; The Republican National Committee votes to censure representatives Adam Kinzinger and Liz Cheney over their participation in the United States House Select Committee on the January 6 Attack.	President Biden after signing the executive order pertaining to labor practices
Saturday, February 5		
Sunday, February 6	President Biden speaks with Israeli prime minister Naftali Bennett on issues including security and Iran.	
Monday, February 7	President Biden holds a bilateral meeting and joint press conference with German Chancellor Olaf Scholz at the White House.; Eric Lander, the director of the Office of Science and Technology Policy, resigns after admitting to demeaning and disrespectful behavior towards colleagues.	President Biden and German Chancellor Olaf Scholz
Tuesday, February 8	President Biden delivers remarks touting the Infrastructure Investment and Jobs Act, highlighting a recent Tritium factory opening in Lebanon, Tennessee that will manufacture electric vehicle chargers. In the remarks, the President acknowledged Tesla as the nation's largest electric vehicle manufacturer.; The United States House of Representatives passes a stop-gap funding bill that will avoid a government shutdown and fund the government until March 11 if also passed by the Senate and signed by President Biden.	President Biden standing with Tritium CEO Jane Hunter
Wednesday, February 9	President Biden holds a roundtable with Energy Secretary Jennifer Granholm and utility company executives to promote the Build Back Better Act and to discuss climate change.; President Biden speaks with Salman bin Abdulaziz Al Saud of Saudi Arabia, discussing issues relating to the Houthi–Saudi Arabian conflict and other regional issues.; President Biden speaks with French president Emmanuel Macron about his recent meeting with Vladimir Putin and Volodymyr Zelenskyy and the 2021–2022 Russo-Ukrainian crisis.	President Biden speaks during a meeting with energy executives
Thursday, February 10	President Biden delivers remarks at Germanna Community College in Culpeper, Virginia promoting the Build Back Better Act, speaking on prescription drug prices and Medicare.; President Biden hosts the Democratic members of the United States Senate Committee on the Judiciary to discuss filling the vacancy in the Supreme Court of the United States being left by retiring Justice Stephen Breyer.	President Biden speaks at Germanna Community College President Biden hosts Democratic lawmakers for a meeting
Friday, February 11	President Biden signs Executive Order 14064, freeing up $7 billion in frozen assets from Da Afghanistan Bank that was seized after the Fall of Kabul. Half of the assets will be used for humanitarian aid in Afghanistan and half will be used as compensation for victims of the September 11 attacks.; President Biden's National Security Advisor Jake Sullivan announces during a press conference that a Russian invasion of Ukraine is imminent, and urging any American citizens in Ukraine to leave.; President Biden speaks with Canadian prime minister Justin Trudeau, expressing his concern about the ongoing Freedom Convoy which has slowed trade between the two countries.; President Biden orders 3,000 additional combat troops from Fort Bragg to Poland as a show of support for NATO allies.; President Biden participates in a video conference with trans-Atlantic leaders including British prime minister Boris Johnson and Secretary General of NATO Jens Stoltenberg, among others, to discuss the ongoing 2021–2022 Russo-Ukrainian crisis.	President Biden speaks during a video conference with NATO leaders
Saturday, February 12	President Biden speaks with Russian president Vladimir Putin for 62 minutes, telling him that an invasion of Ukraine would result in "swift and severe costs".; The United States Department of State orders all employees of the U.S. Embassy in Ukraine to leave the country.; United States secretary of defense Lloyd Austin orders all U.S. military personnel to leave Ukraine and reposition themselves in other areas of Europe.	President Biden at Camp David, where he spoke with Russian President Vladimir Putin
Sunday, February 13	President Biden speaks with Ukrainian president Volodymyr Zelenskyy, assuring him that if Russia were to invade Ukraine the United States would respond "swiftly and decisively". President Zelenskyy asks for increased financial and military aid in addition to inviting President Biden to visit Ukraine.	
Monday, February 14	President Biden speaks with British prime minister Boris Johnson, discussing the ongoing 2021–2022 Russo-Ukrainian crisis.	
Tuesday, February 15	President Biden speaks with representatives of the National Association of Counties at the Washington Hilton to promote the Infrastructure Investment and Jobs Act.; President Biden speaks with French president Emmanuel Macron, discussing the ongoing 2021–2022 Russo-Ukrainian crisis.; President Biden delivers an Address to the Nation, highlighting that Russia still has 150,000 soldiers surrounding Ukraine and "analysts indicate that they very much in a threatening position".	President Biden speaks to the National Association of Counties
Wednesday, February 16	President Biden speaks with German Chancellor Olaf Scholz, discussing the 2021–2022 Russo-Ukrainian crisis.	
Thursday, February 17	President Biden says to reporters that Russia will invade Ukraine "within a few days" while he left for a trip in Ohio.	
Friday, February 18	One day after his trip to Ohio, Biden provides an update in the Roosevelt Room about the situation between Russia and Ukraine.	President Biden speaks about the situation in Ukraine
Saturday, February 19		
Sunday, February 20		
Monday, February 21	President Biden signs an executive order to prohibit investment between U.S. individuals and the two breakaway regions of Eastern Ukraine (which was recognized as independent by Russia on the same day).	President Biden signs Executive Order 14065
Tuesday, February 22	President Biden announces the United States response to Russia invading Ukraine.	President Biden speaks about the situation in Ukraine
Wednesday, February 23		
Thursday, February 24	President Biden condemns Russia's invasion of Ukraine, saying Russian president Vladimir Putin "chose this war" and announcing new sanctions against Russia.	President Biden delivers remarks on Russia's invasion of Ukraine
Friday, February 25	President Biden nominates Ketanji Brown Jackson as an Associate Justice of the Supreme Court to fill the vacancy created upon the retirement of Stephen Breyer.; The White House announces the US will personally sanction Russian president Vladimir Putin and foreign minister Sergey Lavrov.	
Saturday, February 26		
Sunday, February 27		
Monday, February 28		

=== March 2022 ===
Date	Events	Photos/videos
Tuesday, March 1	President Biden delivers his first official State of the Union Address.	President Biden delivers his first official State of the Union Address (transcript)
Wednesday, March 2		
Thursday, March 3		
Friday, March 4	President Biden holds a bilateral meeting with Finnish president Sauli Niinistö at the White House. During the meeting, President Biden made a phone call with Swedish prime minister Magdalena Andersson.	President Biden and Finnish President Sauli Niinistö
Saturday, March 5		
Sunday, March 6		
Monday, March 7		
Tuesday, March 8	President Biden announces further sanctions against Russia due to Russia's invasion of Ukraine targeting Russian oil imports into United States.	President Biden announces a ban on Russian oil imports.
Wednesday, March 9	President Biden makes a phone call with President-elect of South Korea Yoon Suk-yeol to congratulate him on his victory in the 2022 South Korean presidential election.; Biden signs Executive Order 14067, which addresses the development of digital assets, such as Cryptocurrency.	
Thursday, March 10	President Biden holds a bilateral meeting with Colombian president Iván Duque Márquez at the White House.; Vice President Harris begins her trip to Poland and Romania.; Vice President Harris holds a joint press conference with President of Poland Andrzej Duda.	President Biden and Colombian President Iván Duque Márquez
Friday, March 11	Vice President Harris holds a joint press conference with Romanian president Klaus Iohannis.	Vice President Harris and Romanian President Klaus Iohannis
Saturday, March 12		
Sunday, March 13		
Monday, March 14		
Tuesday, March 15	President Biden signs the Consolidated Appropriations Act of 2022 into law in the Indian Treaty Room.; President Biden meets with First Lady of Iceland Eliza Reid at the White House.	President Biden signs the Consolidated Appropriations Act of 2022
Wednesday, March 16	President Biden delivers remarks about Volodymyr Zelenskyy's speech and U.S. military aid in Ukraine.	President Biden speaks about U.S. economic aid to Ukraine
Thursday, March 17	President Biden holds a virtual bilateral meeting with Taoiseach Micheál Martin of Ireland at the White House.	President Biden and Taoiseach Micheál Martin
Friday, March 18	President Biden holds a virtual bilateral meeting with Chinese leader Xi Jinping.	President Biden meets virtually with Chinese leader Xi
Saturday, March 19		
Sunday, March 20		
Monday, March 21	President Biden gives a proclamation on Greek Independence Day.; President Biden gives a statement that Russia has the potential to plant cyberattacks in the US.	
Tuesday, March 22	White House Press Secretary Jen Psaki tests positive for COVID-19 again.	
Wednesday, March 23	President Biden heads to the Brussels extraordinary summit in Brussels.	
Thursday, March 24	President Biden releases a statement on the death of former secretary of state Madeleine Albright.; President Biden attends an extraordinary NATO summit and meets with multiple world leaders.	President Biden at the NATO summit in Brussels
Friday, March 25	President Biden meets with Polish president Andrzej Duda.	President Biden and Polish President Andrzej Duda receive a briefing on Ukraine
Saturday, March 26	President Biden delivers an address in the courtyard of Warsaw's Royal Castle regarding the efforts to support Ukraine. Most notably, Biden said that Russian president Vladimir Putin "cannot remain in power" and he called him a "brutal dictator".	President Biden Delivers Remarks on the United Efforts to Support the People of Ukraine
Sunday, March 27		
Monday, March 28	President Biden submits a $5.79 trillion plan that calls for Congress to provide military and financial aid to Ukraine.	President Biden at the announcement of the budget for fiscal year 2023
Tuesday, March 29	President Biden holds a bilateral meeting and joint press conference with Singaporean prime minister Lee Hsien Loong at the White House.; President Biden signs the Emmett Till Antilynching Act into law.	President Biden and Singaporean Prime Minister Lee Hsien Loong President Biden signs the Emmett Till Antilynching Act.
Wednesday, March 30	The Biden administration announces the launch of COVID.gov, a website that helps citizens access vaccines and treatments for COVID-19.; President Biden receives his second COVID-19 booster shot and warns that the U.S. will not have enough vaccines to ensure free access for all Americans by fall if Congress does not approve $22.5 billion in additional funding.	President Biden receives a second COVID-19 booster shot
Thursday, March 31	President Biden orders the release of 1 million barrels of oil per day from the nation's petroleum reserve every day for six months. Biden will also call on Congress to impose financial penalties on oil and gas companies that lease public land without producing energy.	President Biden speaks about efforts to reduce energy prices.

== See also ==
- First 100 days of the Biden presidency – Period from January to April 2021
- List of executive actions by Joe Biden
- Lists of presidential trips made by Joe Biden (international trips)
- Presidential transition of Joe Biden – Transfer of presidential power from Donald Trump to Joe Biden
- Timeline of the 2020 United States presidential election

U.S. presidential administration timelines
Preceded by Biden presidency (2021 Q4)	Biden presidency (2022 Q1)	Succeeded by Biden presidency (2022 Q2)
