= Job creation index =

Economic indicator

A job creation index is a measure of net hiring of full- and part-time adult workers. In the US, the index score is derived by subtracting the percentage of American workers who say their employers are 'firing' from the percentage of workers who say their employers are 'hiring'.

== United States ==
The job creation index has been increasing since falling to -5 in February 2009 during the Great Recession.

According to Gallup, in 2013 North Dakota was ranked number 1 for job creation in the US and had the highest job creation index with a score of 40, thus surpassing its closest competitors District of Columbia and South Dakota's score by 10 points. North Dakota has held this spot since 2009. Rhode Island earned a spot at the bottom of the job creation index with a score of 12. In 2013, the average score in the U.S. was 20, up 2 points from 2012. Nearly all states have shown significant improvement in job creation. The survey showed that northern states in the midwest are seeing a growth in jobs much more so than in other parts of the US. The results are based on telephone interviews from Gallup, which took place from January 2, 2013 - December 29, 2013. Gallup surveyed 208,758 adults employed full or part-time in all 50 states.

In July 2017, the job creation index returned to its all-time high of +37. This was one point higher than the index score in June.

=== Politics ===
Three of the top five job creation index scores of 2013 are heavily Republican while a significant number of the states with the bottom index scores (six out of the bottom seven) are heavily Democratic. However, Gallup assessed, “Apart from this, there is little correspondence between net hiring and partisan affiliation in the states."

== United States 2013 scores ==
Top 10 scores of 2013
States	Job creation index
North Dakota	40
District of Columbia	30
South Dakota	30
Delaware	29
Nebraska	29
Minnesota	28
Texas	27
Michigan	25
Iowa	25
Arizona	23

Bottom 10 scores of 2013
States	Job Creation Index
Rhode Island	12
New Mexico	13
Vermont	13
West Virginia	14
New York	15
Connecticut	15
Maine	16
North Carolina	16
New Hampshire	16
Kentucky	16

== See also ==
- Bureau of Labor Statistics
- Conference Board Leading Economic Index
- Economic mobility
- Economy of the United States
- Ghost job
- List of U.S. states and territories by unemployment rate
- Occupational Outlook Handbook
- Unemployment in the United States
