= First 100 days of the Biden presidency =

Period from January to April 2021

- Part of the presidency of Joe Biden
- Date: January 20, 2021 – April 30, 2021

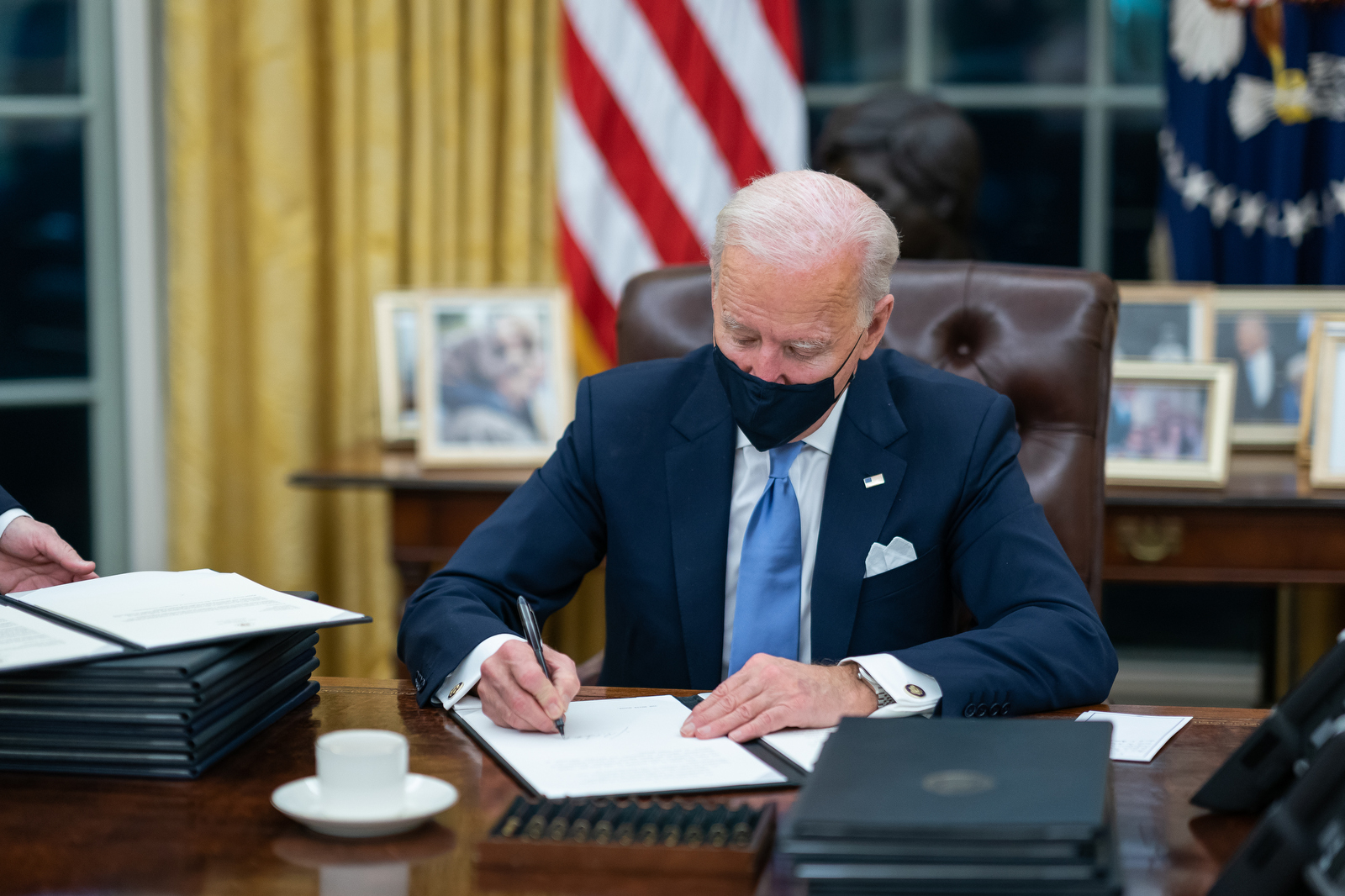
Biden signing multiple executive actions on the first day of his presidency

The first 100 days of the Biden presidency began on January 20, 2021, the day Joe Biden was inaugurated as the 46th president of the United States. The first 100 days of a presidency took on symbolic significance during Franklin D. Roosevelt's first term in office, and the period is considered a benchmark to measure the early success of a president. The 100th day of Biden's presidency was April 30, 2021.

In his first 100 days, President Biden signed 42 executive orders, more than any of his predecessors since Harry S. Truman. Many of these executive orders were reversals to Donald Trump's policies and to resume where Barack Obama—under whom Biden served as vice president—left off after his two terms in office. On March 11, he signed the American Rescue Plan, a $1.9 trillion bill to help relieve economic strain due to the COVID-19 pandemic.

Biden's first two years in office was concurrent with the Democrats holding a slim majority in both the House of Representatives and the Senate, with the elections of Jon Ossoff and Raphael Warnock in Georgia, marked an overall government trifecta for the Democrats for the first time since the 111th Congress in 2009 at the beginning of Obama's presidency. This was crucial in ensuring the passage of the American Rescue Plan, as every Republican senator voted against it.

== Pledges ==
Biden pledged to do the following in the first 100 days of his presidency:

- Provide 100 million doses of the COVID-19 vaccine; this goal was later doubled to 200 million doses
- Utilize the Defense Production Act to produce personal protective equipment
- Raise the refugee cap set by Donald Trump from 15,000 to 125,000
- Revoke the permit for the Keystone XL Pipeline
- Stop construction on the Mexico–United States border wall
- End travel restrictions from Muslim countries ("Muslim Ban")
- Rejoin the Paris Climate Agreement and the World Health Organization
- End United States involvement in the War in Afghanistan and the Yemeni Civil War
- No new oil drilling on federal lands

=== Fulfillment of pledges ===
While Biden pledged to do the above within his first 100 days in office, by the end of his 100 days Biden had completed:

==== Complete fulfillment ====
- Provide 100 million doses of the COVID-19 vaccine; (later doubled to 200 million doses)
- Revoke the permit for the Keystone XL Pipeline
- Rejoin the Paris Climate Agreement and the World Health Organization
- End travel restrictions from Muslim countries associated with terrorism ("Muslim Ban")
- Use the Defense Production Act to produce personal protective equipment

==== Fulfillment after first 100 days ====
- End United States involvement in the War in Afghanistan

==== Partial fulfillment ====
- Stop construction of the southern border wall (Biden paused construction during first 100 days, but later resumed it at a smaller capacity)
- Raise refugee cap set by Donald Trump from 15,000 to 125,000 (with the increased cap, 60,014 refugees have been admitted as of mid-2023)

==== Unfulfilled ====
- No new oil drilling on federal lands
- End the US involvement in the Yemeni Civil War (The United States remains in support of Saudi-Arabian backing in the Yemeni Civil War, although involvement is reduced somewhat)

== Inauguration ==
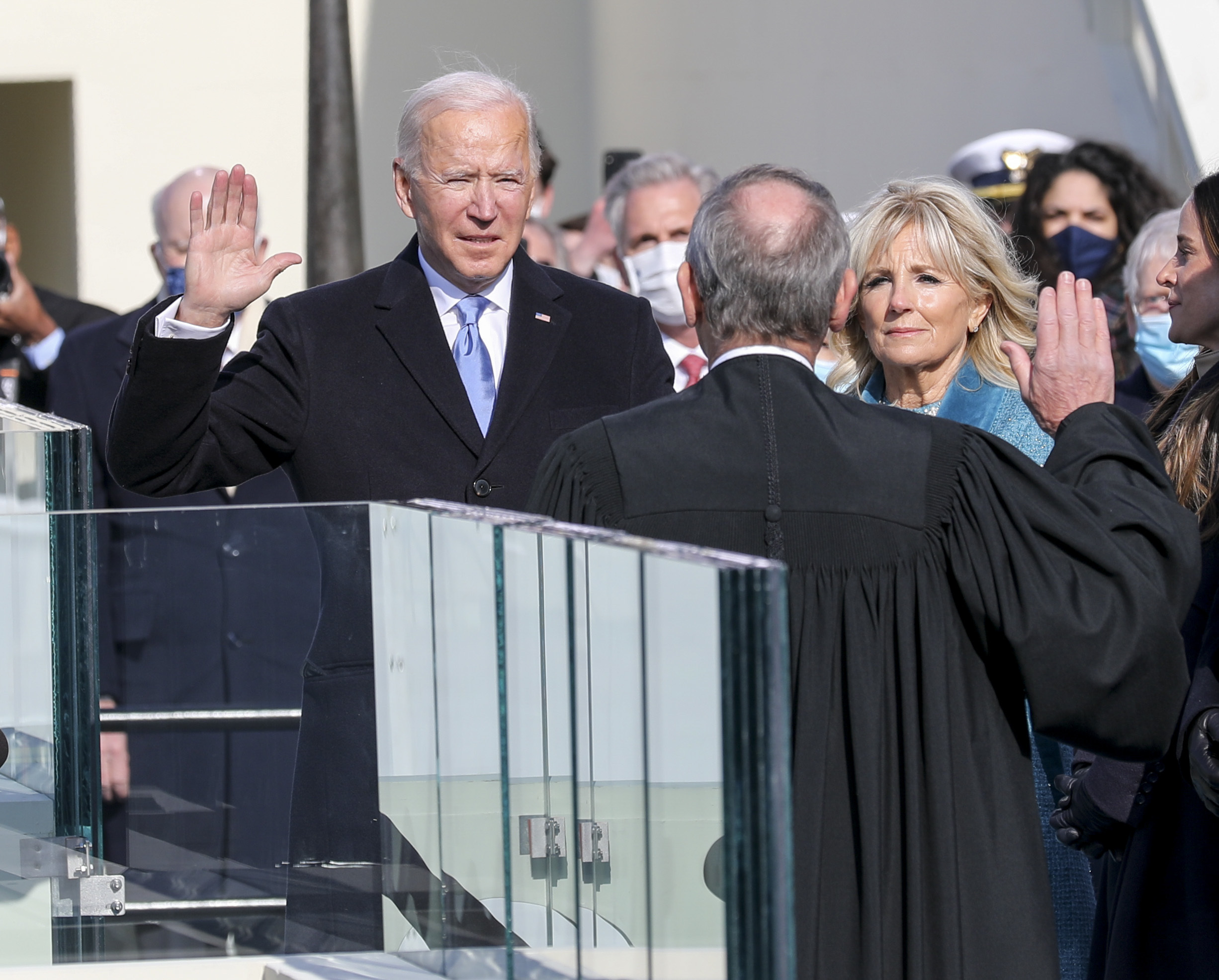
Biden takes his oath of office, administered by Chief Justice John Roberts at the Capitol.

Biden delivers his 2021 inaugural address.

The inauguration of Joe Biden was the 59th presidential inauguration and it marked the completion of Biden's Presidential transition which began the morning of November 7, 2020 after his victory in the 2020 presidential election and concluded at noon of January 20, 2021. Joe Biden and Kamala Harris were formally inaugurated as the 46th President and 49th Vice President of the United States at noon on January 20, 2021, at the Capitol, marking the start of the first 100 days of the Biden presidency.

=== Presidential Communications ===
The content of Whitehouse.gov was switched from the First Trump Administration version to the Biden Administration version, while the prior was archived as TrumpWhiteHouse This was the fourth time the presidential website had switched between administrations and the second time switching control of social media accounts such as Twitter. As Biden took the oath of office, the official @POTUS Twitter account switched to President Biden and Donald Trump's previous tweets were moved to @POTUS45. Members of the Biden administration assumed control of numerous social media accounts while former First Trump Administration accounts were similarly archived such as Jill Biden assuming @FLOTUS, Kamala Harris assuming @VP, Doug Emhoff assuming @SGOTUS, Jen Psaki assuming @PressSec, along with others. Biden's cabinet members were given new social media accounts as previous administrations had done and new executive branch websites were created while previous administration websites reside in the National Archives.

=== Attempts to overturn the 2020 United States presidential election ===
Following Joe Biden's victory in the 2020 United States presidential election, then-President Donald Trump, along with his campaign and political allies, pursued an effort to dispute the election. These efforts culminated in the January 6 United States Capitol attack, in which thousands of President Trump's supporters stormed the Capitol while the electoral votes were being counted, despite President Trump's admonition to be peaceful. Of the hundreds of people who stormed the Capitol, the Department of Justice under the Biden Administration found none of them guilty of sedition.

Trump and his allies encouraged election officials to throw out legitimate votes, especially in states where Biden won with a narrow lead. In a phone call in early January, Trump pressed Georgia's Secretary of State, Brad Raffensperger, to "find" 11,780 votes, the number of votes by which he lost in the state. President Trump refused to concede until January 7, 2021, when he publicly acknowledged that he would not serve a second term.

== Administration and Cabinet ==
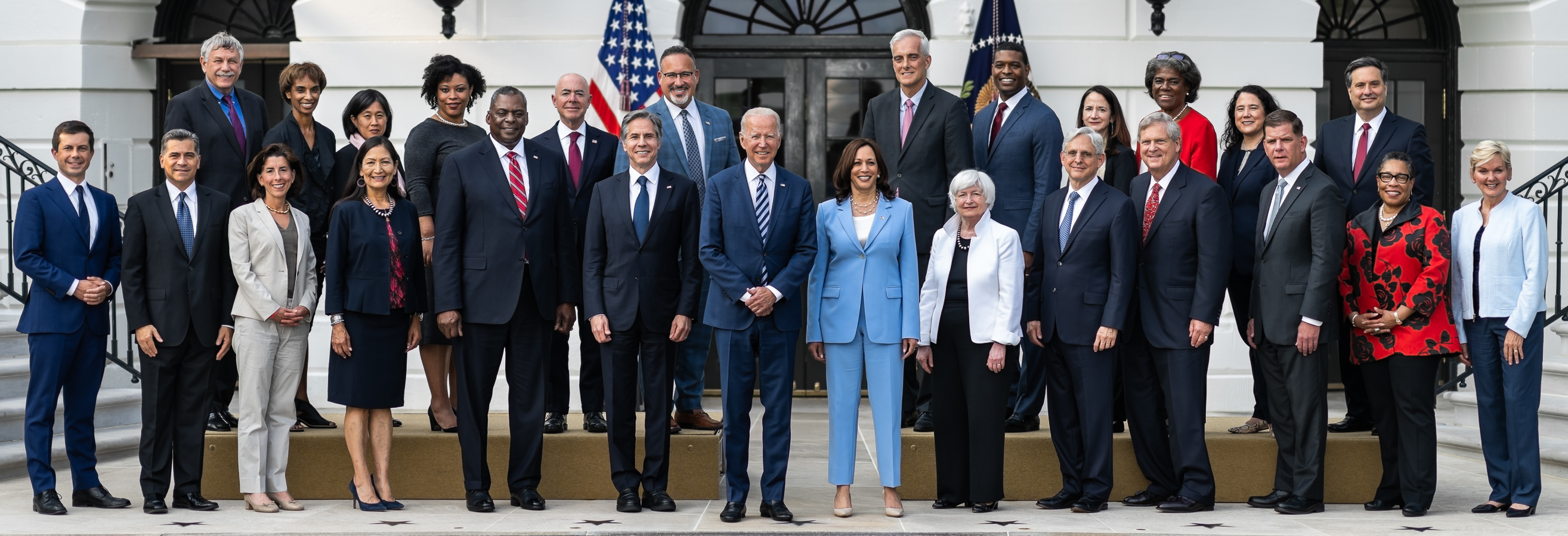
Cabinet of President Biden in July 2021

On January 18, 2021, Biden announced his 23-member cabinet. These included Secretary of State Antony Blinken, Attorney General Merrick Garland, Treasury Janet L. Yellen, Defense Lloyd Austin, the Interior Deb Haaland, Agriculture Tom Vilsack, Envoy for Climate John Kerry, Commerce Gina Raimondo, Labor Martin J. Walsh, Health Xavier Becerra, Security Advisor Jake Sullivan, UN Ambassador Linda Thomas-Greenfield, Trade Representative Katherine Tai, Domestic Policy Susan Rice, Veterans Affairs Denis McDonough, Intelligence Avril D. Haines, Homeland Security Alejandro N. Mayorkas, Housing Marcia L. Fudge, Energy Jennifer M. Granholm, Transportation Pete Buttigieg, Climate Gina McCarthy, EPA Administrator Michael S. Regan, and Education Miguel A. Cardona.

== Domestic policy ==
=== American Rescue Plan ===
The American Rescue Plan is a $1.9 trillion economic stimulus package, which passed the 117th United States Congress on March 10, 2021, and signed into law by President Biden the next day. Building on the CARES Act, it created a number of measures to relieve the economy due to the COVID-19 pandemic, including the following:

- Sending $1,400 direct payments to citizens making under $75,000 a year, with the benefits phasing out for high-income taxpayers
- Paid leave benefits for 100 million workers by offering a tax credit for employers who offer paid leave
- Extending the child tax credit for 2021 from $2,000 per child to $3,000 per child
- Grants to small businesses, including over $28 billion for restaurants through the Restaurant Revitalization Fund

The Act passed on a near party-line vote, with 50 Senate Democrats voting for the bill and 49 Republicans voting against. An amended version passed the House with 220 votes for it and 211 votes against, with one Democrat joining every Republican in voting against it.

=== COVID-19 vaccine distribution ===
A major goal of President Biden was to distribute 100 million doses of the COVID-19 vaccine by the end of his first 100 days. By the time Biden took office, Operation Warp Speed was already distributing a million doses a day on average. This goal was reached by the 59th day of his presidency, and he soon after doubled the goal to 200 million doses. This goal was met on April 21, 2021, with a week to spare until his 100th day in office.

Timeline of daily COVID-19 vaccine doses administered in the US. See the latest date on the timeline at the bottom.

=== Immigration policy ===
Biden campaigned on the promise he would roll back President Trump's hard-line stance on illegal immigration. Shortly after taking office, he ended construction on the Mexico–United States border wall. Biden had pledged to raise the Trump-era immigration cap from 15,000 people a year to 125,000, but backtracked on this promise shortly after becoming president, citing humanitarian concerns. His administration worked to protect hundreds of thousands of illegal immigrants, mainly from Venezuela and Myanmar, from deportation. Lack of significant action has drawn criticism, especially since Biden has failed to deliver on many of his immigration-related promises.

== Foreign policy ==
=== Rejoining international organizations ===
On June 1, 2017, President Trump announced that the United States would pull out of the 2015 Paris Agreement on climate change mitigation. The withdrawal took place on November 4, 2020, one day after the 2020 election. Following the election, President-Elect Biden pledged to rejoin the agreement, which he did on his first day in office. The United States formally rejoined the agreement on February 19, 2021.

In July 2020, President Trump formally announced plans to withdraw the United States from the World Health Organization, accusing the WHO of being under China's control. The withdrawal was to be effective as of July 6, 2021. In a letter to UN Secretary-General Antonio Guteres on January 20, 2021, President Biden stated that the United States would resume funding the WHO.

=== China ===
The Biden administration made competing with China a top priority. The United States sanctioned Chinese officials over human rights abuses and kept in place the tariffs which were introduced by the Trump administration. Biden has emphasized the importance of rebuilding ties with allies to counter Chinese growth.

=== Defense ===
When Biden took office, the US military budget was at an all-time high—the Trump administration had requested a budget of over $740 billion for FY 2020. Biden promised to repair relationships with allies, and stated that the United States was "fully committed" to the NATO alliance. During his address to the Munich Security Conference, he said that the United States would "earn back [its] position of trusted leadership."

== Speech to a joint session of Congress ==
The 46th President of the United States, Joe Biden, gave his first public address before a joint session of the United States Congress on April 28, 2021, the eve of his 100th day in office.

== See also ==
- Presidential transition of Joe Biden
- Opinion polling on the Joe Biden administration
