= Ellis Island: The Dream of America =

21st-century composition by Peter Boyer

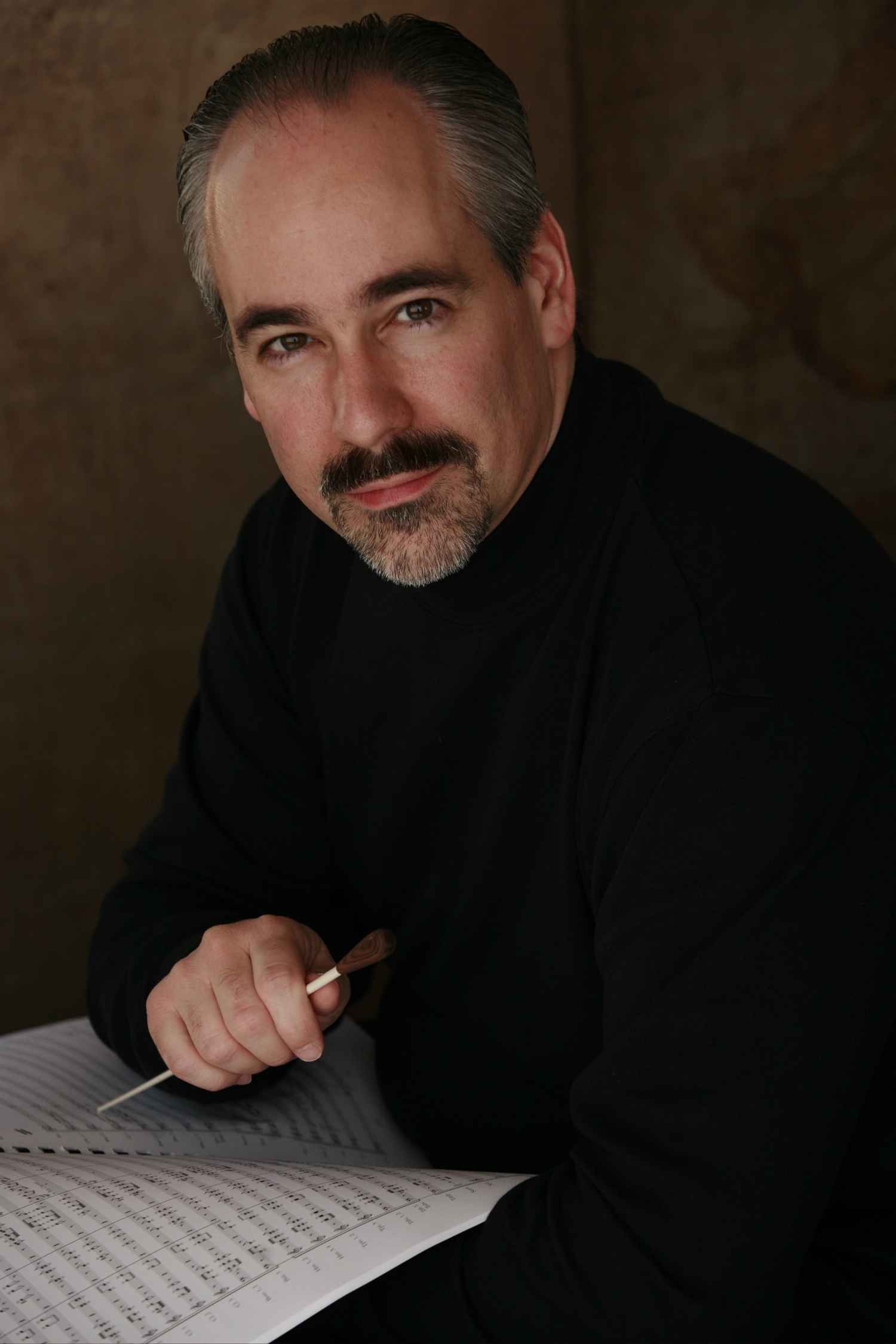
Peter Boyer

Ellis Island: The Dream of America is a work for actors and orchestra with projected images by American composer Peter Boyer, composed in 2001-02, commissioned by the Bushnell Center for the Performing Arts in Hartford, Connecticut. The work combines first-person narrations of seven immigrants who entered the United States through Ellis Island between 1910 and 1940, selected by Boyer from the Ellis Island Oral History Project, with Boyer’s original orchestral music. The work has received over 300 performances by more than 130 orchestras. A recording of the work released on the Naxos record label was nominated for a Grammy Award for Best Classical Contemporary Composition in the 48th annual Grammy Awards. In April 2017, performances by Pacific Symphony of Ellis Island: The Dream of America were filmed for broadcast on PBS’ Great Performances series in the 2017-18 broadcast season. Boyer has credited this work to leading to other commissions dealing with American subject matter, including Balance of Power (commissioned by Bonnie McElveen-Hunter in honor of Henry Kissinger's 95th birthday), Fanfare for Tomorrow (commissioned for President Biden's January 2021 presidential inauguration), Rolling River (sketches on "Shenandoah"), and In the Cause of the Free (commissioned as a reflection on Veteran's Day and the WWI Armistice, and inspired by Laurence Binyon's poem For the Fallen). Among the most high-profile orchestras to perform Ellis Island: The Dream of America was The Cleveland Orchestra, in April 2023.
