= A Hundred Years On =

Oratorio by Peter Boyer, premiered 2026

- Oratorio by Peter Boyer
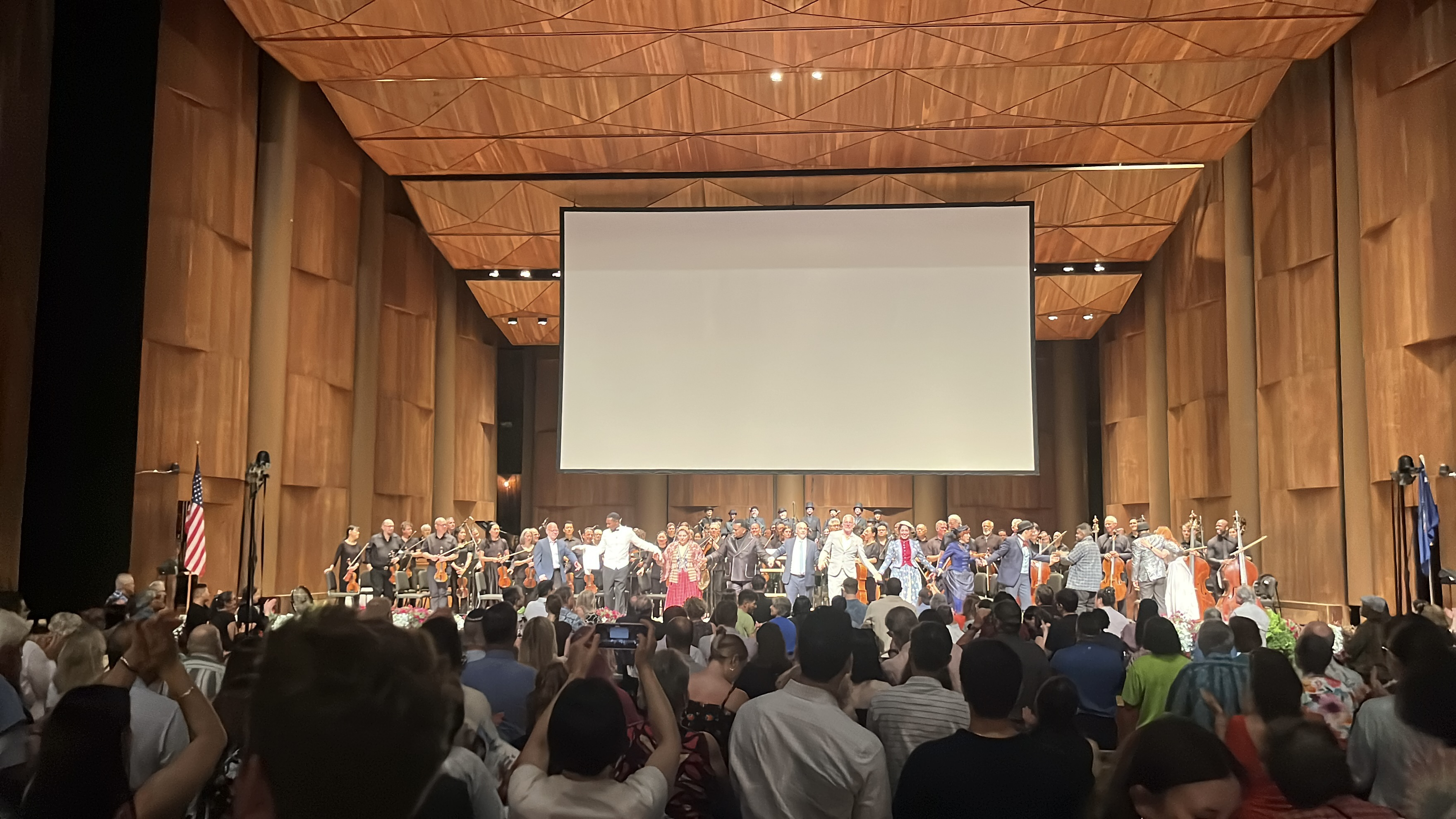
- The piece's premiere's bows
- Composed: 2024–2026
- Duration: 45 minutes
- Vocal: SATB choir and five soloists
- Instrumental: Orchestra

Premiere
- Date: June 17, 2026
- Location: Highmark Mann, Philadelphia
- Conductor: Anthony Parnther
- Performers: The Philadelphia Orchestra; The Crossing; Mary Dunleavy; Meredith Lustig; Eve Gigliotti; David Portillo; Malcolm J. Merriweather

A Hundred Years On is an English-language oratorio by American composer Peter Boyer commissioned to celebrate the 50-year anniversary of Highmark Mann in Philadelphia, Pennsylvania. Its libretto was written by Mark Campbell and honors the 150 year anniversary 1876 Philadelphia Centennial Exposition, which took place in Fairmount Park, Philadelphia; the same location where the Mann sits in the present. The commission was given to Boyer in 2024 with a grant of $360,000.

Its premiere came shortly after the Center's $70 million renovation and was conducted by Anthony Parnther. It took place at the Mann on June 17, 2026 and was performed by the Philadelphia Orchestra, The Crossing, and the soloists: Mary Dunleavy, Meredith Lustig, Eve Gigliotti, David Portillo and Malcolm J. Merriweather.

== History ==
In 2024, the Mann Center commissioned Peter Boyer with a grant of $360,000 to compose a piece to celebrate the venue's 50 year anniversary.

=== Premiere ===
The piece was premiered at The Mann Center, on June 17, 2026, by the Philadelphia Orchestra and The Crossing under conductor Anthony Parnther. The 50-year anniversary performance also included The Star-Spangled Banner (conducted by Cherelle Parker), John Williams's Liberty Fanfare, Julia Wolfe's Liberty Bell and John Philip Sousa's The Stars and Stripes Forever.

== Composition ==
The work is roughly 45 minutes long and is orchestrated for SATB choir, five soloists and orchestra.

Each section within the piece focuses on a different character and their experience with the exposition. The characters within the piece include: Amelia Dunning, a mother who "mournfully watches" children play on decommissioned cannon due to her son's death during the American Civil War; Susan McCormick, a Ohioan housewife visiting the Women's Pavilion; Horace Clarke, an ecstatic man viewing a brand-new telephone; Ignatius Thomas, a black server at the Restaurant of the South; and Marion Jozwiak, a Polish immigrant viewing the exposition from the Statue of Liberty's torch.

== Reception ==
On the piece premiere, both John McWhorter of The New York Times and Maayan Voss de Bettancourt of OperaWire questioned the use of images during the performance; but while McWhorter "gradually found that they made the piece a more complete experience", De Bettencourt stated that the use of AI to animate images "ruined the experience" and made her "physically nauseous". She stated that while she found the film's genuine archival image use and non-AI parts "legitimately great", she believed that the AI sections "sloppified them gave the impression that the creative team didn't trust the audience to be sufficiently thrilled by these depictions of a lesser-known part of our history".
