= 2021 National Day of Unity =

Presidential proclamation by Joe Biden

National Day of Unity, 2021

Presidential proclamation
- Signed by: Joe Biden
- Signed: January 20, 2021

National Day of Unity, 2021 was the first Presidential proclamation signed by President Joe Biden.

== History ==
A presidential proclamation is a statement issued by a president on a matter of public policy, issued under specific authority granted to the President by Congress and typically on a matter of widespread interest. Executive orders, Presidential memoranda, and Presidential proclamations are compiled by the Office of the Federal Register (within the National Archives and Records Administration) and is printed by the Government Printing Office which are published daily, except on federal holidays. A free source to get a copy of these documents is the Federal Register that contains government agency rules, proposed rules, and public notices. There are no copyright restrictions on the Federal Register; as a work of the U.S. government, it is in the public domain.

National Day of Unity, 2021 was proclaimed on January 20, 2021, for Biden's presidential inaugural address.

== National Day of Unity ==
The proclamation is as follows:

- I am humbled before God and my fellow Americans to take the sacred oath of President of our beloved country. Today, we celebrate the triumph of democracy after an election that saw more Americans voting than ever before in our Nation's history, and where the will of the people has been heard and heeded.
- We do so at a moment of great peril and promise for our Nation. A once-in-a-century deadly pandemic. A historic and deepening economic crisis. Calls for racial justice some 400 years in the making. A climate crisis with force and fury. We also feel the rise in political extremism and domestic terrorism — unleashed just days ago on our Capitol, the citadel of freedom, but brewing long before — that we must confront and defeat.
- Yet in this dire moment, democracy prevailed. On this day, we set our sights on the Nation we know we can and must be. I am honored to do so alongside Vice President Kamala Harris, the first woman who has taken the oath to serve in elected national office, and who will not be the last. Together, we know that to overcome the challenges before all of us, to restore the soul of America, requires the beating heart of a democracy: Unity.
- With unity, we can save lives and beat this pandemic. We can build our economy back better and include everyone. We can right wrongs and root out systemic racism in our country. We can confront the climate crisis with American jobs and ingenuity. We can protect our democracy by seeing each other not as adversaries but as fellow Americans. For the world to see, with unity we can lead not just by the example of our power, but by the power of our example.
- As we start the hard work to be done, I pray this moment gives us the strength to rebuild this house of ours upon a rock that can never be washed away. And, as in the Prayer of St. Francis, for where there is discord, union; where there is doubt, faith, where there is darkness, light.
- On this Inauguration Day I swear an oath to be a President for all Americans and ask every American to join me in this cause of democracy. May this be the story that unites us as fellow Americans and as the United States of America.
- NOW, THEREFORE, I, JOSEPH R. BIDEN JR., President of the United States of America, by the authority vested in me by the Constitution and the laws of the United States, do hereby proclaim January 20, 2021, a National Day of Unity and call upon the people of our Nation to join together and write the next story of our democracy — an American story of decency and dignity, of love and of healing, and of greatness and of goodness.
- IN WITNESS WHEREOF, I have hereunto set my hand this twentieth day of January, in the year of our Lord two thousand twenty-one, and of the Independence of the United States of America the two hundred and forty-fifth.
