= Peter Boyer =

American classical composer

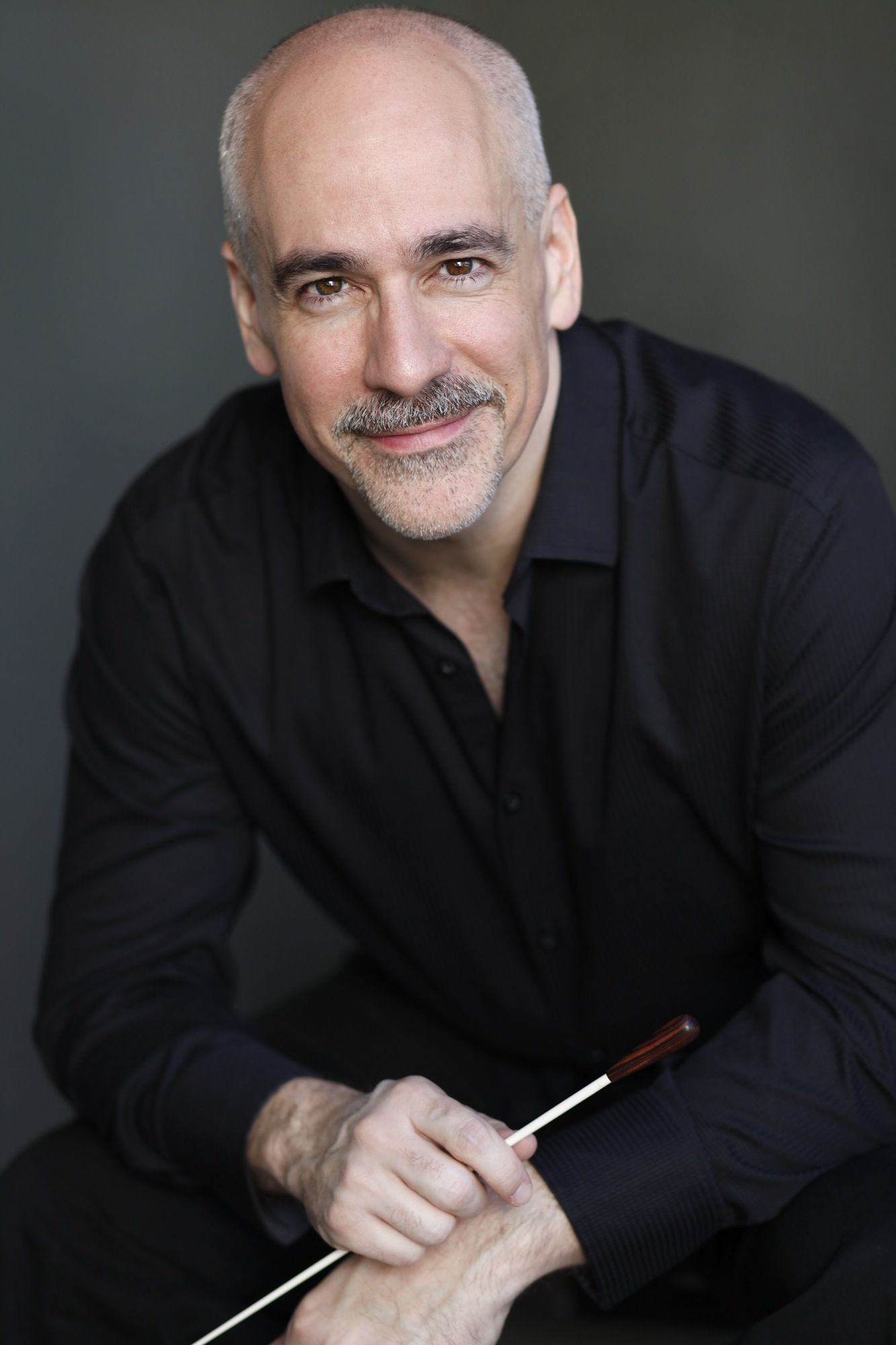
Peter Boyer

Peter Boyer (born February 10, 1970, in Providence, Rhode Island, United States) is an American composer, conductor, orchestrator, and former professor of music. He is known primarily for his orchestral works, which have received over 900 performances, by more than 300 orchestras, and most notably his compositions on American themes.

== Biography and work ==
Boyer received a Bachelor of Arts degree from Rhode Island College. While an undergraduate, USA Today named him to its first All-USA College Academic Team (1990), composed of "the 20 best and brightest" college students in the United States, and he received the Young American Award. He received Master of Music and Doctor of Musical Arts degrees from The Hartt School of the University of Hartford, where he studied composition with Larry Alan Smith and Robert Carl and conducting with Harold Farberman. Boyer then studied privately with composer John Corigliano in New York, before relocating to Los Angeles to attend the Scoring for Motion Pictures and Television Program at the USC Thornton School of Music. There Boyer studied with composers including Elmer Bernstein, David Raksin, Buddy Baker and Christopher Young. On completing his studies in 1996, Boyer was appointed to the faculty of Claremont Graduate University, and in 1999 he was named the first recipient of its Helen M. Smith Chair in Music. He held this professorship until 2025, when he resigned in order to focus exclusively on composition work. In 2003, Boyer established the publishing company Propulsive Music, which continues to publish his compositions.

Boyer has received a number of significant commissions for his work. Among the many orchestras that have performed Boyer's works are the Boston Symphony Orchestra, National Symphony Orchestra, Hollywood Bowl Orchestra, Philadelphia Orchestra, Cleveland Orchestra, Dallas Symphony, Cincinnati Pops Orchestra, Pittsburgh Symphony, Houston Symphony, Detroit Symphony, Baltimore Symphony, San Diego Symphony, Utah Symphony, Nashville Symphony, Pacific Symphony, Colorado Symphony, Indianapolis Symphony, Phoenix Symphony, Brooklyn Philharmonic, Buffalo Philharmonic, Fort Worth Symphony, Kansas City Symphony, Virginia Symphony, Hartford Symphony, Des Moines Symphony, Pasadena Symphony, and Bamberg Symphony. In 2001, Boyer conducted the London Symphony Orchestra at Abbey Road Studios in his debut commercial recording. On its release, Boyer became one of the youngest composers to have an entire album of his orchestral music recorded with a world-class orchestra and distributed by an international record label (Koch). This recording was widely broadcast and acclaimed: "Peter Boyer makes a most impressive debut on disc as composer and conductor of his own music. At its finest, his music is attractive, finely crafted with a genuine humanity, refreshing for being non-didactic in these times of preachy self-importance."

In 2003, Boyer conducted London's Philharmonia Orchestra in a recording of his work Ellis Island: The Dream of America, later working with a distinguished cast of actors in New York City to complete this recording project, which was released on the Naxos record label. The recording received a Grammy Award nomination for Best Classical Contemporary Composition in the 48th annual Grammy Awards (2006). Ellis Island has become Boyer's best-known work, with over 300 performances given by more than 130 orchestras, and has been much acclaimed: "Peter Boyer's Ellis Island: The Dream of America is a work of rare authenticity and directness."

In February 2010, the Boston Pops Orchestra and Conductor Keith Lockhart announced that they had commissioned Boyer to compose a work entitled The Dream Lives On: A Portrait of the Kennedy Brothers, celebrating the legacy of John F. Kennedy, Robert F. Kennedy, and Edward M. Kennedy as the centerpiece of the orchestra's 125th anniversary season.^{,} In April 2010, the Boston Pops announced the participation of Hollywood actors Robert De Niro, Morgan Freeman, and Ed Harris as the narrators for Boyer's work. The Dream Lives On was premiered at Boston's Symphony Hall on May 18, 2010. The event received extensive media attention, was attended by many members of the Kennedy family, and was recorded and telecast on Boston's WCVB-TV.^{,} The Boston Globe wrote: "Boyer's work accomplishes the goals… of amplifying the texts by these three American icons. His writing draws from the traditions of Williams-esque Hollywood film scores, Broadway musicals, and American neo-Romanticism."

Conductor Miguel Harth-Bedoya appointed Boyer as the Composer-in-Residence for the Fort Worth Symphony Orchestra for the 2010–11 season. Conductor Gerard Schwarz commissioned Boyer to compose Festivities in celebration of the 50th anniversary of the Eastern Music Festival in 2011. Boyer was appointed as the 2012-13 Composer-in-Residence for the Pasadena Symphony, which commissioned his Symphony No. 1; he conducted the premiere of that work on April 27, 2013. In June 2013, Boyer conducted the London Philharmonic Orchestra at Abbey Road Studios for his third recording, including his Symphony No. 1 and four other works. Naxos released this recording in 2014 to positive reviews: "Boyer writes in a fluent, powerful style that fuses conservative American currents with Hollywood-ish size and populist sentiment."

In June 2015, Boyer's Silver Fanfare was chosen to open the Hollywood Bowl season, in a performance by the Hollywood Bowl Orchestra conducted by Thomas Wilkins, on a gala concert that featured the rock band Journey. In January 2016, the Pacific Symphony announced that Boyer's Ellis Island would be the centerpiece of its annual American Composers Festival in 2017. In March 2017, Pacific Symphony announced that their performances of Boyer's Ellis Island would be filmed for PBS' highly prestigious Great Performances series, to be broadcast in the 2017–18 season. These Ellis Island performances received critical acclaim in the Los Angeles Times and Orange County Register, which stated, "Boyer writes in an accessible style… which at its best is warm, attractive, emotionally persuasive and expertly crafted." The PBS Great Performances national television debut of Ellis Island: The Dream of America with Pacific Symphony took place on June 29, 2018.^{,}

“The President’s Own” United States Marine Band commissioned Boyer to compose a work in celebration of its 220th anniversary season in 2018, and premiered Boyer's Fanfare, Hymn and Finale in July 2018. The John F. Kennedy Center for the Performing Arts commissioned Boyer's Balance of Power for the National Symphony Orchestra’s 90th anniversary season in 2020-2021. In a review of the premiere of Balance of Power, which was delayed due to the coronavirus pandemic, The Washington Post wrote of the audience reaction, “the applause went on like a fourth movement.” Boyer was again commissioned by the United States Marine Band to compose a work, Fanfare for Tomorrow, to be premiered at the inauguration of President Joe Biden on January 20, 2021.^{,}

In July 2022, Naxos released Boyer's album Balance of Power – Orchestral Works, with the composer conducting the London Symphony Orchestra. The album received positive reviews; among them, BBC Music Magazine wrote, “Peter Boyer’s broad-brush cinematic works have the orchestral buoyancy of John Williams and the absorbing emotionalism of the late James Horner.” Boyer was commissioned for a work celebrating the coronation of King Charles III by the London-based ORA Singers and conductor Suzi Digby; the premiere of Today We Ask, with text by Grahame Davies and music by Boyer, at St. Paul's, Covent Garden, was broadcast by Classic FM on May 5, 2023, the eve of the coronation. In June 2023, pianist Jeffrey Biegel premiered Boyer's Rhapsody in Red, White & Blue with the Utah Symphony, launching a multi-year project called the “Rhapsody National Initiative,” celebrating the centennial of George Gershwin’s Rhapsody in Blue, which will include performances of Boyer's work by Biegel with orchestras in all fifty of the United States.^{,}

In addition to his work for the concert hall, Boyer's career has included work in the film and television music industry. He has composed scores for The History Channel, and has served as an orchestrator for composers such as Michael Giacchino, Thomas Newman, James Newton Howard, James Horner, Alan Menken, Mark Isham, Aaron Zigman, Harry Gregson-Williams, Heitor Pereira, Michael Kamen, Graeme Revell, and others, on films from Warner Bros., 20th Century Fox, Paramount Pictures, Disney, Pixar, Touchstone Pictures, Universal Studios, Columbia Pictures, and Relativity Media.

Boyer's awards include two BMI Student Composer Awards (1994 and 1996), the First Music Carnegie Hall commission of the New York Youth Symphony (1997), the Ithaca College Heckscher Prize in composition (2002), the Alumnus of the Year Award from The Hartt School (2002), an honorary Doctor of Music degree from Rhode Island College (2004), and the Lancaster Symphony Orchestra Composer's Award (2010). In February 2019, the Ellis Island Honors Society named Boyer a recipient of the 2019 Ellis Island Medal of Honor.

== Selected compositions ==
- A Hundred Years On for five vocal soloists, chorus and orchestra (libretto by Mark Campbell) (2024–26)
- American Mosaic for narrator and orchestra with video by Joe Sohm (2024–25)
- Festive Fanfare (For Akron’s Bicentennial) for brass and percussion (2025)
- Horizons for orchestra (2024)
- Today We Ask for chorus, brass quintet and timpani (2023)
- Rhapsody in Red, White & Blue for piano and orchestra (2022–23)
- Radiance for string orchestra (2021)
- Elegy for English horn, harp and string orchestra (2021)
- Mount Ararat for cello and piano (2021)
- Fanfare for Tomorrow for concert band or orchestra (2021)
- Balance of Power for orchestra (2019)
- Fanfare, Hymn and Finale for concert band (2018) or orchestra (2020)
- In the Cause of the Free for trumpet and orchestra (2017)
- Curtain Raiser for concert band (2017) or orchestra (2020)
- Rolling River (Sketches on "Shenandoah") for orchestra (2014)
- Symphony No. 1 for orchestra (2012–13)
- Festivities for orchestra (2011)
- The Dream Lives On: A Portrait of the Kennedy Brothers for narrators, chorus and orchestra (2009–10)
- American Rhapsody for piano and orchestra (2007–08)
- Dreaming a World for narrator, children's chorus, mixed chorus, percussion and orchestra (2006)
- And the night shall be filled with music for chorus and piano (2005)
- Silver Fanfare for orchestra (2004)
- On Music's Wings for soprano, baritone, children's chorus, mixed chorus and orchestra (2003–04)
- Ellis Island: The Dream of America for actors and orchestra with projected images (2001–02)
- Ghosts of Troy for orchestra (2000)
- New Beginnings for orchestra (2000)
- Three Olympians for string orchestra (2000)
- At the Crossings for four brass quartets and four percussion (1998)
- The Phoenix for orchestra (1997)
- Celebration Overture for orchestra (1997)
- Titanic for orchestra (1995)
- perchance to dream… for soprano and chamber orchestra (1993–94)
- Mosaic for orchestra (1992–93)
- I Can Recall for soprano and piano (1990)
