= Archival image =

Image meant to have lasting utility

An archival image is an image meant to have lasting utility. Archival images are usually kept off-line on a cheaper storage medium such as CD-ROM or magnetic tape, in a secure environment. Archival images are usually of a higher resolution and quality than the digital image delivered to the user on-screen. The file format most often associated with archival images is Tag Image File Format (TIFF) as compared to on-screen viewing file formats, which are usually JPEGs and GIFs.
