= Fanfare for Tomorrow =

Orchestral work by Peter Boyer

Fanfare for Tomorrow is a musical composition written by the American composer Peter Boyer. It was originally composed in 2020 as a short fanfare for solo horn on a commission from the Cincinnati Symphony Orchestra and Cincinnati Pops Orchestra and was given its premiere by the horn player Elizabeth Freimuth on YouTube on May 29, 2020. A version for concert band was later commissioned by "The President's Own" United States Marine Band in honor of the inauguration of Joe Biden as the 46th president of the United States; this version of the piece was given its world premiere by the United States Marine Band (to which this version is dedicated) under the direction of Colonel Jason Fettig at the inaugural ceremony of President Joe Biden and Vice President Kamala Harris in Washington, D.C., on January 20, 2021. Boyer also arranged a version of Fanfare for Tomorrow for orchestra; this version was premiered by the Eastern Festival Orchestra conducted by Gerard Schwarz on July 3, 2021.

== Composition ==
=== Background ===
Fanfare for Tomorrow lasts about two-and-a-half minutes in performance. The original solo horn version was commissioned as part of Cincinnati Symphony Orchestra's Fanfare Project—an initiative to stream new music for solo instruments while much of the United States was in COVID-19 lockdowns.

After the 2020 United States presidential election was called for Joe Biden, Boyer sent an email to Col. Jason Fettig, with whom he had previously collaborated, offering to compose a piece for the inauguration. Boyer did not receive an official commission request until January 1, 2021, however, giving the composer only 12 days to complete the work. Boyer was unable to attend the inaugural ceremony due to heightened security following the January 6 United States Capitol attack, but streamed the premiere on both CNN and C-SPAN from his home in Altadena, California.

=== Instrumentation ===
The concert band version of the piece is scored for piccolo, three flutes (3rd optionally doubling piccolo), two oboes, E-flat clarinet (optional), three clarinets, two bass clarinets, two bassoons, two alto saxophones, tenor saxophone, baritone saxophone, four horns, five trumpets, four trombones, two euphoniums, three tubas, timpani, and five or six percussionists.

The orchestral version of the piece is scored for piccolo, three flutes (3rd optional), three oboes (3rd optional), two clarinets, bass clarinet, two bassoons, contrabassoon, four horns, three trumpets, three trombones, tuba, timpani, four or five percussionists, and strings.

== Recording ==
A recording of the orchestral version of Fanfare for Tomorrow, in addition to several other Boyer works, was released on album through Naxos in July 2022.
