= Timeline of the Joe Biden presidency (2023 Q1) =

The following is a timeline of the presidency of Joe Biden during the first quarter of 2023, from January 1 to March 31, 2023. For a complete itinerary of his travels, see List of presidential trips made by Joe Biden (2023). To navigate between quarters, see timeline of the Joe Biden presidency. For the Q2 timeline see timeline of the Joe Biden presidency (2023 Q2).

== Timeline ==
=== January 2023 ===
Date	Events	Photos/videos
Sunday, January 1		
Monday, January 2	The final session of the Democratic-controlled House of Representatives took place.	
Tuesday, January 3	The 118th United States Congress convenes with the Republican Party controlling the House of Representatives while the Democratic caucus retains their majority in the Senate. (Note: Kyrsten Sinema, whose seat was not up for election in 2022, left the Democratic Party and became an independent politician in December 2022, after the election but before the swearing in of the next Congress. As a result, 48 Democrats (rather than 49), plus Angus King and Bernie Sanders, independents who caucus with Democrats, were in the Senate upon commencement of the 118th United States Congress, on January 3, 2023. Sinema opted to caucus with neither party but continued to align with the Democrats, bringing the Democratic Senate majority to 51 seats.); No candidates in the January 2023 Speaker of the United States House of Representatives election reach the threshold of 218 needed to be elected speaker after 3 rounds of voting. Democrat Hakeem Jeffries leads the ballot with 212 votes.	
Wednesday, January 4	No candidates in the January 2023 Speaker of the United States House of Representatives election reach the threshold of 218 needed to be elected speaker after 6 rounds of voting. Democrat Hakeem Jeffries maintains his lead of 212 votes.	
Thursday, January 5	President Biden says Russian president Vladimir Putin is "trying to find oxygen" after announcing a 36-hour ceasefire from the invasion of Ukraine for the Russian Orthodox Christmas.; No candidates in the January 2023 Speaker of the United States House of Representatives election reach the threshold of 218 needed to be elected speaker after 11 rounds of voting. Democrat Hakeem Jeffries maintains his lead of 212 votes.	
Friday, January 6	President Biden awards 14 individuals the Presidential Citizens Medal on the second anniversary of the January 6 United States Capitol attack for their service in either protecting the United States Capitol or preventing attempts to overturn the 2020 presidential election.; No candidates in the January 2023 Speaker of the United States House of Representatives election reach the threshold of 218 needed to be elected speaker after 14 rounds of voting. Republican Kevin McCarthy takes a small lead with 216 votes to Hakeem Jeffries' consistent 212 votes.	President Biden awards the Presidential Citizens Medal
Saturday, January 7	Republican Kevin McCarthy is elected as Speaker of the United States House of Representatives after 15 rounds of voting.	House Speaker Kevin McCarthy
Sunday, January 8	President Biden condemns the invasion of the Brazilian Congress by former Brazilian president Jair Bolsonaro's supporters after his election defeat to Luiz Inácio Lula da Silva.; President Biden travels to El Paso, Texas, to visit the U.S.–Mexico border.	President Biden with U.S. Customs and Border Protection officers
Monday, January 9	President Biden declares an emergency in California after a bomb cyclone.; The White House Counsels Office comments, after a news report, that President Biden is cooperating with an inquiry in to classified documents found in an office of the Penn Biden Center in November 2022. The documents were from his time as vice president in the Obama Administration.	
Tuesday, January 10	President Biden attends the North American leaders's summit with Canadian Prime Minister Justin Trudeau and Mexican President Andrés Manuel López Obrador in Mexico.	President Biden with Canadian Prime Minister Justin Trudeau and Mexican President Andrés Manuel López Obrador
Wednesday, January 11	The Biden administration extended the COVID-19 public health emergency to April following the spread of the XBB.1.5 variant.	
Thursday, January 12	The White House Counsels Office announce that lawyers for President Biden found additional classified documents in the garage of his home in Wilmington, Delaware. Attorney General, Merrick Garland, announced his appointment of Robert K. Hur as a special counsel for the investigation into the documents.	
Friday, January 13	President Biden holds a bilateral meeting with Japanese prime minister Fumio Kishida at the White House.	President Biden and Japanese Prime Minister Fumio Kishida
Saturday, January 14		
Sunday, January 15	President Biden delivers a sermon at the Ebenezer Baptist Church on 94th anniversary of Martin Luther King Jr.'s birthday.	President Biden delivering a sermon at the Ebenezer Baptist Church
Monday, January 16	President Biden delivers remarks at an event hosted by the National Action Network on Martin Luther King Jr. Day.	President Biden delivering remarks at the National Action Network
Tuesday, January 17	President Biden holds a bilateral meeting with Dutch prime minister Mark Rutte at the White House.; President Biden and Vice President Harris celebrate the Golden State Warriors NBA championship.	President Biden and Dutch Prime Minister Mark Rutte President Biden and Vice President Harris celebrate the Golden State Warriors 2022 NBA Victory
Wednesday, January 18		
Thursday, January 19	President Biden visits California to see the storm-related damage.	President Biden delivers remarks in Aptos, California about the storm-related damage
Friday, January 20	President Biden completes his second year in office.; The FBI conducted a search of the entire premises of Biden's Wilmington home. They identified and removed six documents containing classified markings from Biden's home office. CNN reported the search was conducted with the consent of Biden's attorneys.	President Biden and Vice President Harris Reflect the First Two Years of the administration
Saturday, January 21		
Sunday, January 22		
Monday, January 23	President Biden orders American flags to half-staff due to the Monterey Park shooting.	
Tuesday, January 24		
Wednesday, January 25	President Biden announces that thirty-one Abrams tanks will be sent to Ukraine by the U.S. Army.; Members of the Senate Intelligence Committee demand to see Biden's and Trump's classified documents, saying that the current administration is blocking them from seeing the materials.; The Smithsonian Museum displays First Lady Jill Biden's outfits from her husband's inauguration.	President Biden delivers remarks on Ukraine
Thursday, January 26	President Biden delivers remarks on the economy in Springfield, Virginia.	President Biden delivering remarks at Steamfitters Local 602
Friday, January 27	President Biden telephones the parents of Tyre Nichols a black man who was fatally beaten during a traffic stop by five police officers who are now facing murder charges.	
Saturday, January 28		
Sunday, January 29		
Monday, January 30		
Tuesday, January 31	President Biden announced the end to the COVID-19 emergency declarations as of May 11, 2023.	

=== February 2023 ===
Date	Events	Photos/videos
Wednesday, February 1	President Biden meets with Speaker of the House Kevin McCarthy at the White House.; The FBI conducted a planned search of the Rehoboth, Delaware, beach home of President Biden, as part of a classified documents investigation.	President Biden and Speaker of the House Kevin McCarthy
Thursday, February 2	President Biden holds a bilateral meeting with King Abdullah II and Crown Prince Hussein of Jordan for a private lunch at the White House.; Former president Bill Clinton visits the White House to mark the 30th anniversary of the Family and Medical Leave Act.	President Biden, King Abdullah II and Crown Prince Hussein of Jordan President Biden and Vice President Harris with former president Bill Clinton
Friday, February 3		
Saturday, February 4	President Biden orders U.S. military aircraft to shoot down an alleged surveillance balloon from China over the Atlantic Ocean near Myrtle Beach, South Carolina.	
Sunday, February 5		
Monday, February 6		
Tuesday, February 7	President Biden delivers his second official State of the Union Address to a joint session of the 118th United States Congress.	President Biden delivers his second official State of the Union Address (transcript)
Wednesday, February 8		
Thursday, February 9		
Friday, February 10	President Biden holds a bilateral meeting with Brazilian president Luiz Inácio Lula da Silva at the White House.	President Biden and Brazilian President Luiz Inácio Lula da Silva
Saturday, February 11		
Sunday, February 12		
Monday, February 13		
Tuesday, February 14		
Wednesday, February 15	President Biden delivers remarks on the economy in Lanham, Maryland.	President Biden delivering remarks at IBEW Local 26
Thursday, February 16		
Friday, February 17		
Saturday, February 18		
Sunday, February 19		
Monday, February 20	President Biden makes a surprise visit to Kyiv, Ukraine and holds a bilateral meeting and joint press conference with Ukrainian president Volodymyr Zelenskyy at the Mariinskyi Palace. (Note: For more details, see 2023 visit by Joe Biden to Ukraine.); President Biden departs Ukraine on Air Force One landing in Warsaw, Poland in the evening.	President Biden and Ukrainian President Volodymyr Zelenskyy
Tuesday, February 21	President Biden meets with Polish president Andrzej Duda and Prime Minister Mateusz Morawiecki. President Biden delivers an address in the courtyard of Warsaw's Royal Castle regarding the Russian invasion of Ukraine hours after Russian president Vladimir Putin's State of the Nation speech.; The Biden administration unveils a new rule that could tighten restrictions for tens of thousands of asylum seekers arriving at the country's southern border with Mexico.	President Biden and Polish Prime Minister Mateusz Morawiecki
Wednesday, February 22	President Biden meets with leaders of the Bucharest Nine nations.	President Biden and leaders of the Bucharest Nine nations
Thursday, February 23		
Friday, February 24		
Saturday, February 25		
Sunday, February 26		
Monday, February 27		
Tuesday, February 28		

=== March 2023 ===
Date	Events	Photos/videos
Wednesday, March 1		
Thursday, March 2		
Friday, March 3	President Biden awards the Medal of Honor at the White House to Paris Davis, a former army medic who served during the Vietnam War.; President Biden holds a bilateral meeting with German chancellor Olaf Scholz at the White House.	President Biden presents the Medal of Honor to Paris Davis President Biden and German Chancellor Olaf Scholz
Saturday, March 4		
Sunday, March 5		
Monday, March 6		
Tuesday, March 7	President Biden announces new Medicare plan through 2050 which increases taxes to the wealthy and allowing more negotiations for prescription drug prices.	
Wednesday, March 8		
Thursday, March 9	President Biden holds a bilateral meeting with Finnish president Sauli Niinistö at the White House.	President Biden and Finnish President Sauli Niinistö
Friday, March 10	President Biden holds a bilateral meeting with European Commission President Ursula von der Leyen at the White House.	President Biden and European Commission President Ursula von der Leyen
Saturday, March 11		
Sunday, March 12		
Monday, March 13	President Biden arrives in San Diego for an AUKUS meeting.	President Biden, Australian Prime Minister Anthony Albanese and British Prime Minister Rishi Sunak
Tuesday, March 14		
Wednesday, March 15		
Thursday, March 16		
Friday, March 17	President Biden celebrates Saint Patrick's Day, the national holiday of Ireland. As is tradition on this day in the White House, President Biden received a bowl of shamrock from the Taoiseach of Ireland Leo Varadkar and held a bilateral meeting with him. This was the first time since 2020 (and the Biden Presidency overall) that the shamrock bowl was received in person as the 2021 and 2022 ceremonies were virtual due to the COVID-19 pandemic.	President Biden and Irish Taoiseach Leo Varadkar
Saturday, March 18		
Sunday, March 19		
Monday, March 20	President Biden issued his first veto, overturning a law that would have banned the federal government from considering the environmental impact of investments in retirement funds.	
Tuesday, March 21	President Biden establishes Avi Kwa Ame National Monument (located in Clark County, Nevada) and Castner Range National Monument (located in El Paso County, Texas) under the authority of the Antiquities Act.	President Joe Biden signs the establishment of the Avi Kwa Ame National Monument.
Wednesday, March 22		
Thursday, March 23	President Biden arrives in Ottawa, Canada.	The Bidens at Rideau Cottage
Friday, March 24	President Biden holds a bilateral meeting and joint press conference with Canadian prime minister Justin Trudeau.; President Biden addresses a joint session of the Canadian Parliament.	President Biden and Canadian Prime Minister Justin Trudeau
Saturday, March 25		
Sunday, March 26		
Monday, March 27		
Tuesday, March 28		
Wednesday, March 29	President Biden holds a bilateral meeting with Argentine President Alberto Fernández at the White House.	President Biden and Argentine President Alberto Fernández
Thursday, March 30		
Friday, March 31		

== See also ==
- First 100 days of the Biden presidency – Period from January to April 2021
- List of executive actions by Joe Biden
- Lists of presidential trips made by Joe Biden (international trips)
- Presidential transition of Joe Biden – Transfer of presidential power from Donald Trump to Joe Biden
- Timeline of the 2020 United States presidential election

== Notes ==
U.S. presidential administration timelines
Preceded by Biden presidency (2022 Q4)	Biden presidency (2023 Q1)	Succeeded by Biden presidency (2023 Q2)
