= Timeline of the Joe Biden presidency (2023 Q3) =

The following is a timeline of the presidency of Joe Biden during the third quarter of 2023, from July 1 to September 30, 2023. For a complete itinerary of his travels, see List of presidential trips made by Joe Biden (2023). To navigate between quarters, see timeline of the Joe Biden presidency. For the Q4 timeline see timeline of the Joe Biden presidency (2023 Q4).

== Timeline ==
=== July 2023 ===
Date	Events	Photos/videos
Saturday, July 1		
Sunday, July 2		
Monday, July 3	President Biden nominated Utah Solicitor General Melissa Holyoak and Virginia Solicitor General Andrew Ferguson to fill Republican slots at the Federal Trade Commission. The Senate must confirm them.	
Tuesday, July 4	President Biden and his family celebrates Independence Day.	President Biden host 4th of July celebrations at the White House
Wednesday, July 5	President Biden holds a bilateral meeting with Swedish Prime Minister Ulf Kristersson at the White House.	President Biden and Swedish Prime Minister Ulf Kristersson
Thursday, July 6		
Friday, July 7		
Saturday, July 8		
Sunday, July 9	President Biden arrives in the United Kingdom, beginning a three-nation trip before heading to Lithuania for a NATO summit.	
Monday, July 10	President Biden meets with King Charles III for the first time since his coronation at Windsor Castle. Their meeting makes Biden the first incumbent US president the King has met during his reign.; President Biden holds a bilateral meeting with British Prime Minister Rishi Sunak at 10 Downing Street.	President Biden and King Charles III President Biden and British Prime Minister Rishi Sunak
Tuesday, July 11	President Biden holds a bilateral meeting with Lithuanian President Gitanas Nausėda at the Presidential Palace.; President Biden attends the 33rd NATO Summit at LITEXPO.; President Biden holds a bilateral meeting with Turkish President Recep Tayyip Erdoğan.	President Biden and NATO leaders President Biden and Turkish President Recep Tayyip Erdoğan
Wednesday, July 12	President Biden attends the inaugural meeting of the NATO-Ukraine Council.; President Biden delivers remarks on NATO unity and support for Ukraine at Vilnius University.	President Biden delivers remarks at Vilnius University
Thursday, July 13	President Biden travels to Helsinki and meets with Finnish President Sauli Niinistö, Danish Prime Minister Mette Frederiksen, Swedish Prime Minister Ulf Kristersson, Norwegian Prime Minister Jonas Gahr Støre, and Icelandic Prime Minister Katrín Jakobsdóttir.	President Biden and Nordic leaders
Friday, July 14		
Saturday, July 15		
Sunday, July 16		
Monday, July 17		
Tuesday, July 18	President Biden holds a bilateral meeting with Israeli President Isaac Herzog at the White House.	President Biden and Israeli President Isaac Herzog
Wednesday, July 19		
Thursday, July 20		
Friday, July 21		
Saturday, July 22		
Sunday, July 23		
Monday, July 24	Vice President Kamala Harris delivers remarks at the UnidosUS 2023 Annual Conference in Chicago, Illinois.	
Tuesday, July 25	President Biden signs a declaration designating a national monument to honor lynching victim Emmett Till and his mother.	President Biden signs a proclamation
Wednesday, July 26		
Thursday, July 27	President Biden holds a bilateral meeting with Italian Prime Minister Giorgia Meloni at the White House.; The Biden administration announces the first cancer-focused initiative under its advanced health research agency.	President Biden and Italian Prime Minister Giorgia Meloni
Friday, July 28		
Saturday, July 29		
Sunday, July 30		
Monday, July 31		

=== August 2023 ===
Date	Events	Photos/videos
Tuesday, August 1		
Wednesday, August 2		
Thursday, August 3		
Friday, August 4		
Saturday, August 5		
Sunday, August 6		
Monday, August 7	President Biden celebrates the World Series Houston Astros championship.	President Biden celebrates the 2022 Houston Astros World Series championship
Tuesday, August 8	President Biden signs a proclamation establishing the Baaj Nwaavjo I'tah Kukveni – Ancestral Footprints of the Grand Canyon National Monument.	President Biden signs a proclamation
Wednesday, August 9		
Thursday, August 10		
Friday, August 11		
Saturday, August 12		
Sunday, August 13		
Monday, August 14	The White House has defended President Biden after being criticized by conservatives for his "no comment" remarks when asked about the 2023 Hawaii wildfires.	
Tuesday, August 15	Aboard Air Force One enroute to the disaster, President Biden reviews maps of damage assessments, made by FEMA and the Civil Air Patrol's geospatial team in response to the 2023 Hawaii wildfires.	President Biden reviews imagery
Wednesday, August 16		
Thursday, August 17		
Friday, August 18	President Biden holds a trilateral meeting and joint press conference with Japanese Prime Minister Fumio Kishida and South Korean President Yoon Suk Yeol at Camp David.	President Biden, Japanese Prime Minister Fumio Kishida and South Korean President Yoon Suk Yeol
Saturday, August 19		
Sunday, August 20		
Monday, August 21	President Biden visits Maui, Hawaii to survey the damage caused by the wildfires and meets with local officials and community members.	President Biden speaks at a community event at Lahaina Civic Center
Tuesday, August 22		
Wednesday, August 23		
Thursday, August 24		
Friday, August 25		
Saturday, August 26		
Sunday, August 27		
Monday, August 28		
Tuesday, August 29	President Biden holds a bilateral meeting with Costa Rican President Rodrigo Chaves Robles at the White House.	President Biden and Costa Rican President Rodrigo Chaves Robles
Wednesday, August 30	President Biden delivers remarks on the federal government's response to the Maui wildfires and Hurricane Idalia.	President Biden delivers remarks
Thursday, August 31	President Biden visits the headquarters of the Federal Emergency Management Agency to thank staff coordinating the response to the Maui wildfires and Hurricane Idalia.	President Biden delivers remarks at FEMA headquarters

=== September 2023 ===
Date	Events	Photos/videos
Friday, September 1	President Biden delivers remarks in the White House Rose Garden about the August 2023 Bureau of Labor Statistics Job Report.	President Biden delivers a speech in the White House Rose Garden
Saturday, September 2	President Biden visits Florida to survey the damage caused by Hurricane Idalia and meets with local officials.	President Biden and First Lady Jill Biden in Live Oak, Florida
Sunday, September 3		
Monday, September 4	President Biden delivers remarks in Philadelphia, Pennsylvania celebrating Labor Day and touting the Infrastructure Investment and Jobs Act.	President Biden delivers Labor Day remarks
Tuesday, September 5	President Biden awards the Medal of Honor at the White House to Captain Larry Taylor, a former army medic who served during the Vietnam War.	President Biden presents the Medal of Honor to Larry Taylor
Wednesday, September 6	President Biden delivers remarks celebrating the finalized contract between the International Longshore and Warehouse Union and the Pacific Maritime Association.; The Biden Administration cancels the seven remaining oil and gas leases on the Arctic National Wildlife Refuge.	President Biden speaks about the ILWU and PMA agreement
Thursday, September 7		
Friday, September 8	President Biden arrives in India ahead of the G20 summit and has a meeting with the Prime Minister of India Narendra Modi, discussing a multitude of topics including infrastructure and 6G technology.	President Biden greets Ambassador Eric Garcetti
Saturday, September 9	President Biden attends the G20 summit hosted by Indian Prime Minister Narendra Modi.; President Biden participates in the launch of the Global Biofuel Alliance, a group created to promote biofuel.	President Biden participates in the G20 summit
Sunday, September 10	President Biden arrives in Hanoi, Vietnam, holding a bilateral meeting and joint press conference with Vietnamese General Secretary Nguyễn Phú Trọng.	President Biden and Vietnamese General Secretary Nguyễn Phú Trọng
Monday, September 11	President Biden meets with Vietnamese Prime Minister Phạm Minh Chính and CEOs of Vietnamese companies in the semiconductor, aviation, and tech industries. At the meeting, a purchase of 50 Boeing 737 MAX jets by Vietnam Airlines is announced.; President Biden faces criticism for failing to attend Ground Zero, The Pentagon, or the Flight 93 National Memorial to commemorate the 22nd anniversary of the September 11, 2001 attacks, becoming the first president in 22 years to not commemorate the attacks at any of these locations, instead holding a commemoration at Joint Base Elmendorf-Richardson in Anchorage, Alaska.	President Biden at the John McCain memorial marker in Hanoi President Biden at Joint Base Elmendorf–Richardson
Tuesday, September 12	Speaker of the House Kevin McCarthy announces that the House of Representatives will launch a formal impeachment inquiry against President Biden.	Speaker McCarthy announces a formal impeachment inquiry against President Biden
Wednesday, September 13	President Biden convenes his Cancer Cabinet to speak about advances in cancer research.	President Biden speaks with the Cancer Cabinet
Thursday, September 14	President Biden's son, Hunter Biden, is federally indicted on three counts related to gun possession and drug use.; President Biden speaks in Largo, Maryland, touting Bidenomics and criticizing the economic policies of the Donald Trump administration.; President Biden hosts a virtual meeting with Rabbis a day before Rosh Hashanah and speaks about combatting antisemitism.	President Biden speaks about his economic policy in Largo, Maryland
Friday, September 15	President Biden delivers remarks regarding the 2023 United Auto Workers strike and ongoing negotiations between the United Auto Workers and automakers.	President Biden speaks about the UAW strikes
Saturday, September 16		
Sunday, September 17		
Monday, September 18		
Tuesday, September 19	President Biden delivers a speech at the General debate of the seventy-eighth session of the United Nations General Assembly.; President Biden meets with the leaders of Kazakhstan, Kyrgyzstan, Uzbekistan, Tajikistan, and Turkmenistan in a C5+1 summit at the United Nations General Assembly.	President Biden addresses the United Nations General Assembly President Biden and Central Asian Presidents
Wednesday, September 20	President Biden meets with the Israeli Prime Minister Benjamin Netanyahu, speaking about issues including the two-state solution and the nuclear program of Iran.; President Biden holds a bilateral meeting and press conference with Brazilian President Luiz Inácio Lula da Silva, speaking on issues such as labor rights.	President Biden and Brazilian President Luiz Inácio Lula da Silva
Thursday, September 21	President Biden holds a bilateral meeting with Ukrainian President Volodymyr Zelenskyy at the White House.	President Biden and Ukrainian President Volodymyr Zelenskyy
Friday, September 22		
Saturday, September 23		
Sunday, September 24		
Monday, September 25	President Biden meets with Pacific Island leaders in the second ever US–Pacific Island Country Summit.	Presiden Biden and Pacific Islands Forum leaders
Tuesday, September 26	President Biden joins the picket line of the United Auto Workers strike at the General Motors' Willow Run Redistribution Center. He becomes the first president of the United States to join a picket line of strikers.	President Biden at the UAW picket line
Wednesday, September 27		
Thursday, September 28	President Biden delivers a speech in Arizona, where he also pays tribute to his friend, the late Republican Senator John McCain.	
Friday, September 29	President Biden attends the Armed Forces farewell to the 20th Chairman of the Joint Chiefs General Mark Milley and the swearing-in of the 21st Chairman General Charles Q. Brown, Jr. at Joint Base Myer-Henderson Hall.	President Biden at Joint Base Myer-Henderson Hall
Saturday, September 30		Biden interviewed by ProPublica in September 2023

== See also ==
- First 100 days of the Biden presidency – Period from January to April 2021
- List of executive actions by Joe Biden
- Lists of presidential trips made by Joe Biden (international trips)
- Presidential transition of Joe Biden – Transfer of presidential power from Donald Trump to Joe Biden
- Timeline of the 2020 United States presidential election

== Notes ==
U.S. presidential administration timelines
Preceded by Biden presidency (2023 Q2)	Biden presidency (2023 Q3)	Succeeded by Biden presidency (2023 Q4)
