= Timeline of the Joe Biden presidency (2023 Q2) =

The following is a timeline of the presidency of Joe Biden during the second quarter of 2023, from April 1 to June 30, 2023. For a complete itinerary of his travels, see List of presidential trips made by Joe Biden (2023). To navigate between quarters, see timeline of the Joe Biden presidency. For the Q3 timeline see timeline of the Joe Biden presidency (2023 Q3).

== Timeline ==
=== April 2023 ===
Date	Events	Photos/videos
Saturday, April 1	Vice President Kamala Harris arrives at farm in Lusaka, Zambia, on the final day of her trip to Africa.; In Lusaka, Zambia, Vice President Kamala Harris delivers remarks on increasing climate resilience, adaptation and mitigation across Africa.	
Sunday, April 2	President Biden approves a major disaster declaration for the areas in the state of Arkansas affected by severe storms and tornadoes on March 31, 2023.	
Monday, April 3	President Biden approves a major disaster declaration for the areas in the state of California affected by severe winter storms, straight-line winds, flooding, landslides, and mudslides beginning on February 21, 2023.	
Tuesday, April 4	President Biden talks Britain’s King Charles III in a phone call that First Lady Jill Biden will attend the monarch’s coronation ceremony in May. Biden also congratulates Charles III on his coronation and says that he would like to meet him in the United Kingdom at a later date.; President Biden delivers remarks in the meeting with the President’s Council of Advisors on Science and Technology.; President Biden congratulated Finland on becoming the 31st member of NATO. Biden also urged Hungary and Turkey to approve Sweden's membership bid as soon as possible.	
Wednesday, April 5		
Thursday, April 6		
Friday, April 7		
Saturday, April 8		
Sunday, April 9		
Monday, April 10	President Biden and First Lady Jill Biden host the White House Easter Egg Roll.	President Biden and First Lady Jill Biden attend the White House Easter Egg Roll
Tuesday, April 11	President Biden speaks with the family of Wall Street Journal reporter Evan Gershkovich after calling the reporter’s detention in Russia “totally illegal”.; President Biden leaves Washington for Belfast, Northern Ireland alongside his son Hunter Biden and his sister Valerie Biden. This is the first stop of his four-day, two-country trip.; Northern Ireland police says that four devices, described as pipe bombs, were found in a cemetery based in the Creggan area of Derry, on the same day ahead of President Joe Biden's visit to the country. Derry City and Strabane area commander Superintendent Nigel Goddard says that the main line of inquiry into the incident was attributed to the New IRA (a paramilitary group).; President Biden arrives in Belfast, Northern Ireland to mark the 25th anniversary of the Good Friday Agreement.	President Biden arrives in Belfast, Northern Ireland
Wednesday, April 12	President Biden meets with British Prime Minister Rishi Sunak and delivers remarks at Ulster University.	President Biden and British Prime Minister Rishi Sunak
Thursday, April 13	Irish President Michael D. Higgins welcomes President Biden to Áras an Uachtaráin and holds a bilateral meeting with him.; President Biden meets with Taoiseach Leo Varadkar at Farmleigh House.; President Biden delivers an address to the Irish parliament, becoming the fourth president of the United States to do so.; President Biden invites singer Lady Gaga to be co-chair of the Presidential Committee on the Arts and Humanities.; During a visit to Northern Ireland, President Biden says that he is "very close" to finding the person responsible for the leak of US intelligence service documents, which have been circulating on social media for days.	President Biden addresses the Houses of the Oireachtas
Friday, April 14	President Biden departs Dublin, arriving in Knock, Ireland, in County Mayo.; President Biden delivers remarks in Ballina, County Mayo, on the west coast of Ireland, where he ends his trip with a speech in the same city, home of his paternal ancestors.	President Biden delivers remarks at St Muredach's Cathedral, Ballina
Saturday, April 15		
Sunday, April 16		
Monday, April 17		
Tuesday, April 18	President Biden signs an executive order related to childcare and eldercare during an event in the Rose Garden of the White House, in Washington, D.C.	
Wednesday, April 19		
Thursday, April 20	President Biden holds a bilateral meeting with Colombian President Gustavo Petro at the White House.; President Biden officially announces that he will ask his Congress for US$500 million for the Amazon Fund, the Brazilian government's program that finances actions to combat deforestation in the Amazon rainforest with funds from foreign governments.	President Biden and Colombian President Gustavo Petro
Friday, April 21		
Saturday, April 22		
Sunday, April 23	President Biden confirms that United States embassy staff and their families were evacuated by US forces from Sudan’s war-torn capital Khartoum due to the conflict between the Sudanese army and the paramilitary Rapid Support Forces (RSF).	
Monday, April 24		
Tuesday, April 25	President Biden formally announces his reelection campaign for president in the upcoming 2024 election. His announcement is made during a joint news conference with South Korean President Yoon Suk Yeol.; South Korean President Yoon Suk-yeol, accompanied by his wife Kim Keon-hee, begins a five-day state visit to the US, the second during the Biden presidency.	
Wednesday, April 26	President Biden holds a bilateral meeting and joint press conference with South Korean President Yoon Suk-yeol at the White House. This day marks the 70th anniversary of the United States-South Korea alliance.; President Biden and First Lady Jill Biden host their second state dinner in honor of South Korean President Yoon Suk-yeol and his wife, Kim Keon-hee.; Hunter Biden’s lawyers meet with United States Department of Justice (DOJ) officials to discuss the long-running criminal investigation into the president’s son.	President Biden and First Lady Jill Biden with South Korean President Yoon Suk-yeol and Kim Keon-hee
Thursday, April 27	Vice President Kamala Harris and Secretary Antony Blinken host a state luncheon for President of South Korea Yoon Suk-yeol at the Department of State.	From left: Evan Ryan, Antony Blinken, Jodie Haydon, Anthony Albanese, Kamala Harris, and Doug Emhoff at the Department of State
Friday, April 28		
Saturday, April 29	President Biden attends the White House Correspondents' Association Dinner, hosted by Roy Wood Jr.	President Biden at the White House Correspondents' Association Dinner
Sunday, April 30		

=== May 2023 ===
Date	Events	Photos/videos
Monday, May 1	President Biden holds a bilateral meeting with Filipino President Bongbong Marcos at the White House. Marcos is the first Filipino leader to visit the White House in 10 years.	President Biden and Filippino President Bongbong Marcos
Tuesday, May 2		
Wednesday, May 3	The GOP-led House Oversight Committee issues a subpoena demanding the FBI produce a record related to an alleged "criminal scheme involving then-Vice President Joe Biden and a foreign national".	
Thursday, May 4		
Friday, May 5		
Saturday, May 6	First Lady Jill Biden attends the Coronation of Charles III and Camilla which President Biden chose not to attend.	First Lady Jill Biden and King Charles III
Sunday, May 7	President Biden renews calls for a ban on assault weapons after the Dallas, Texas shooting which left nine people dead, including the gunman.	
Monday, May 8		
Tuesday, May 9		
Wednesday, May 10		
Thursday, May 11		
Friday, May 12	President Biden holds a bilateral meeting with Spanish Prime Minister Pedro Sánchez at the White House.	President Biden and Spanish Prime Minister Pedro Sánchez
Saturday, May 13	President Biden delivers the commencement address at Howard University and receives an honorary Doctor of Letters from the university.	President Biden at Howard University
Sunday, May 14		
Monday, May 15	President Biden attends the graduation commencement of his granddaughter Maisy, daughter of his son Hunter, from the University of Pennsylvania in Philadelphia.	
Tuesday, May 16		
Wednesday, May 17	President Biden cancels a planned visit to Australia for a summit of Quad leaders from the United States, India, Australia, and Japan, citing ongoing negotiations over the US debt ceiling.	
Thursday, May 18	President Biden arrives in Hiroshima, Japan for the 49th G7 summit.; Japanese Prime Minister Fumio Kishida welcomes President Biden at the Hiroshima Prefecture ahead of the G7 summit and holds a bilateral meeting with him.	President Biden meets with Japanese Prime Minister Kishida in Hiroshima
Friday, May 19	President Biden attends the 49th G7 summit in Hiroshima.	G7 leaders at the 49th G7 summit
Saturday, May 20	President Biden attends the QUAD Leaders Summit with Australian Prime Minister Anthony Albanese, Indian Prime Minister Narendra Modi, and Japanese Prime Minister Fumio Kishida on the sideline of the G7 summit.	President Biden with prime ministers Albanese, Kishida and Modi
Sunday, May 21		
Monday, May 22		
Tuesday, May 23		
Wednesday, May 24		
Thursday, May 25	President Biden announces the nomination of Air Force General Charles Q. Brown Jr. as the next Chairman of the Joint Chiefs of Staff in the Rose Garden of the White House. General Brown is the Air Force's first Black commander of the Pacific Air Forces and the first Black chief of staff.	President Biden announces the nomination of General C.Q. Brown
Friday, May 26	President Biden celebrates the NCAA champion LSU Tigers and UConn Huskies championship.	President Biden celebrates the LSU Tigers NCAA championship President Biden celebrates the UConn Huskies NCAA championship
Saturday, May 27		
Sunday, May 28	President Biden attends the graduation commencement of his granddaughter Natalie, daughter of his late son Beau, from St. Andrew's School in Middletown, Delaware.	
Monday, May 29	President Biden performs a wreath-laying ceremony at the Tomb of the Unknown Soldier at the Arlington National Cemetery and delivers the Memorial Day address at the Memorial Amphitheater.	President Biden, Vice President Harris and Secretary Austin at Arlington National Cemetery
Tuesday, May 30		
Wednesday, May 31	The House passes the Fiscal Responsibility Act of 2023 by a vote of 314–117.	

=== June 2023 ===
Date	Events	Photos/videos
Thursday, June 1	President Biden falls down at the Air Force Academy graduation in Colorado Springs, CO.; The Senate passes the Fiscal Responsibility Act of 2023 by a vote of 63–36 to suspend the country's debt limit until January 1, 2025, in a race to avoid the country's first default.	President Biden at the U.S. Air Force Academy commencement ceremony
Friday, June 2	President Biden addresses the nation on prime-time television in the Oval Office for a first time concerning the ongoing debt ceiling crisis.	President Biden addresses the nation on the debt ceiling crisis
Saturday, June 3	President Biden signs the Fiscal Responsibility Act of 2023 into law.	President Biden signing the bipartisan budget agreement into law
Sunday, June 4		
Monday, June 5	President Biden holds a bilateral meeting with Danish Prime Minister Mette Frederiksen at the White House.; President Biden celebrates the Super Bowl Kansas City Chiefs championship.; House Oversight Chairman James Comer will move ahead this week with efforts to view an internal law enforcement document known as an FD-1023. According to Republicans, the document includes an unverified allegation that Joe Biden, while vice president, was involved in a bribery scheme involving a foreign national.; A Federal Appeals Court ruled that the Biden administration still cannot implement certain immigration policies at the southern border.	President Biden and Danish Prime Minister Mette Frederiksen President Biden celebrates the Super Bowl Kansas City Chiefs LVII championship
Tuesday, June 6		
Wednesday, June 7	Members of the Freedom House Caucus, the most right-wing caucus of the Republican Party, block the United States House of Representatives for the second day in a row, in protest against Kevin McCarthy's leadership.	
Thursday, June 8	President Biden holds a bilateral meeting and joint press conference with British Prime Minister Rishi Sunak at the White House.; President Biden sends additional firefighters and aid to Canada in fighting the wildfires.	President Biden and British Prime Minister Rishi Sunak
Friday, June 9		
Saturday, June 10		
Sunday, June 11		
Monday, June 12	President Biden underwent a root canal, delaying his meeting with NATO Secretary, Jens Stoltenberg, to Tuesday, June 13; President Biden misses attending College Athlete Day on the South Lawn at the White House due to his root canal; Vice President Harris attends in his place instead.	
Tuesday, June 13	President Biden holds a bilateral meeting with NATO Secretary General Jens Stoltenberg at the White House.; President Biden holds a bilateral meeting with Uruguayan President Luis Lacalle Pou at the White House.	President Biden and NATO Secretary General Jens Stoltenberg President Biden and Uruguayan President Luis Lacalle Pou
Wednesday, June 14		
Thursday, June 15		
Friday, June 16	President Biden delivers remarks at the National Safer Communities Summit at the University of Hartford.	President Biden and Senator Chris Murphy
Saturday, June 17	President Biden speaks before an audience of union members in Philadelphia in what is his first rally since he declared his bid for a second term.	
Sunday, June 18		
Monday, June 19		
Tuesday, June 20	Indian Prime Minister Narendra Modi, begins a four-day state visit to the US, the third during the Biden presidency.; Hunter Biden, President Biden’s son, agrees to plead guilty to a pair of tax-related misdemeanors and enter into a pretrial diversion agreement that would enable him to avoid prosecution on one felony gun charge, potentially ending the yearslong probe.	
Wednesday, June 21		
Thursday, June 22	President Biden holds a bilateral meeting and joint press conference with Indian Prime Minister Narendra Modi at the White House.; President Biden and First Lady Jill Biden host their third state dinner in honor of Indian Prime Minister Narendra Modi.	President Biden and First Lady Jill Biden with Indian Prime Minister Narendra Modi
Friday, June 23	Vice President Harris and Secretary Blinken host a state luncheon for Indian Prime Minister Modi at the Department of State.; Indian Prime Minister Narendra Modi meets US and Indian business leaders in Washington, on the final day of a state visit.	Antony Blinken, Narendra Modi, and Kamala Harris at the Department of State
Saturday, June 24	President Biden delivers a speech denouncing GOP abortion restrictions.; Vice President Kamala Harris delivers remarks on the anniversary of the United States Supreme Court decision in the Dobbs v. Jackson Women's Health Organization.	
Sunday, June 25		
Monday, June 26		
Tuesday, June 27	President Biden has a private lunch with former President Barack Obama.	
Wednesday, June 28		
Thursday, June 29		
Friday, June 30	The United States Supreme Court blocks President Biden’s student loan forgiveness program and limits LGBTQ protections in a separate case.	

== See also ==
- First 100 days of the Biden presidency – Period from January to April 2021
- List of executive actions by Joe Biden
- Lists of presidential trips made by Joe Biden (international trips)
- Presidential transition of Joe Biden – Transfer of presidential power from Donald Trump to Joe Biden
- Timeline of the 2020 United States presidential election

== Notes ==
U.S. presidential administration timelines
Preceded by Biden presidency (2023 Q1)	Biden presidency (2023 Q2)	Succeeded by Biden presidency (2023 Q3)
