= School of Hotel Administration =

School of Hotel Administration may refer to:

- Cornell University School of Hotel Administration
- William F. Harrah College of Hotel Administration, at University of Nevada, Las Vegas
- School of Hotel Administration (Ithaca), a private school
- Graduate School of Hotel Administration (Pai), a unit of the Dr. T. M. A. Pai Foundation in India
