= Russel Wheel and Foundry Company =

- Company type: Private
- Industry: Foundry
- Founded: 1878, 1883
- Fate: The manufacture of Railcars, railroad wheels and logging equipment ceased in 1916
- Headquarters: Detroit, Michigan
- Products: Railcar manufacturing, wheelset manufacturing, logging equipment and structural steel

Russel Wheel and Foundry Company display ad from Hardwood Recorder October 11, 1906

Russel Wheel and Foundry Company manufactured railroad cars, rail car wheels, logging equipment and structural steel, Tall Skeletal Lighthouses in Detroit, Michigan between 1876 and 1916. In 1916, the company name was changed to Russel Steel Construction Company. Russel Wheel & Foundry supplied and erected the iron and structural steel for the Hammond Building in Detroit. When the Great Depression hit, they closed their doors and never reopened.

Russell Car and Snow Plow Company of Ridgeway, Pennsylvania and the Russel Wheel and Foundry Company of Detroit, MI have no relation.

Walter S. Russel of the Russel Wheel and Foundry Company purchased the K-R-I-T Motor Car Company in 1911
