= National Automobile Museum =

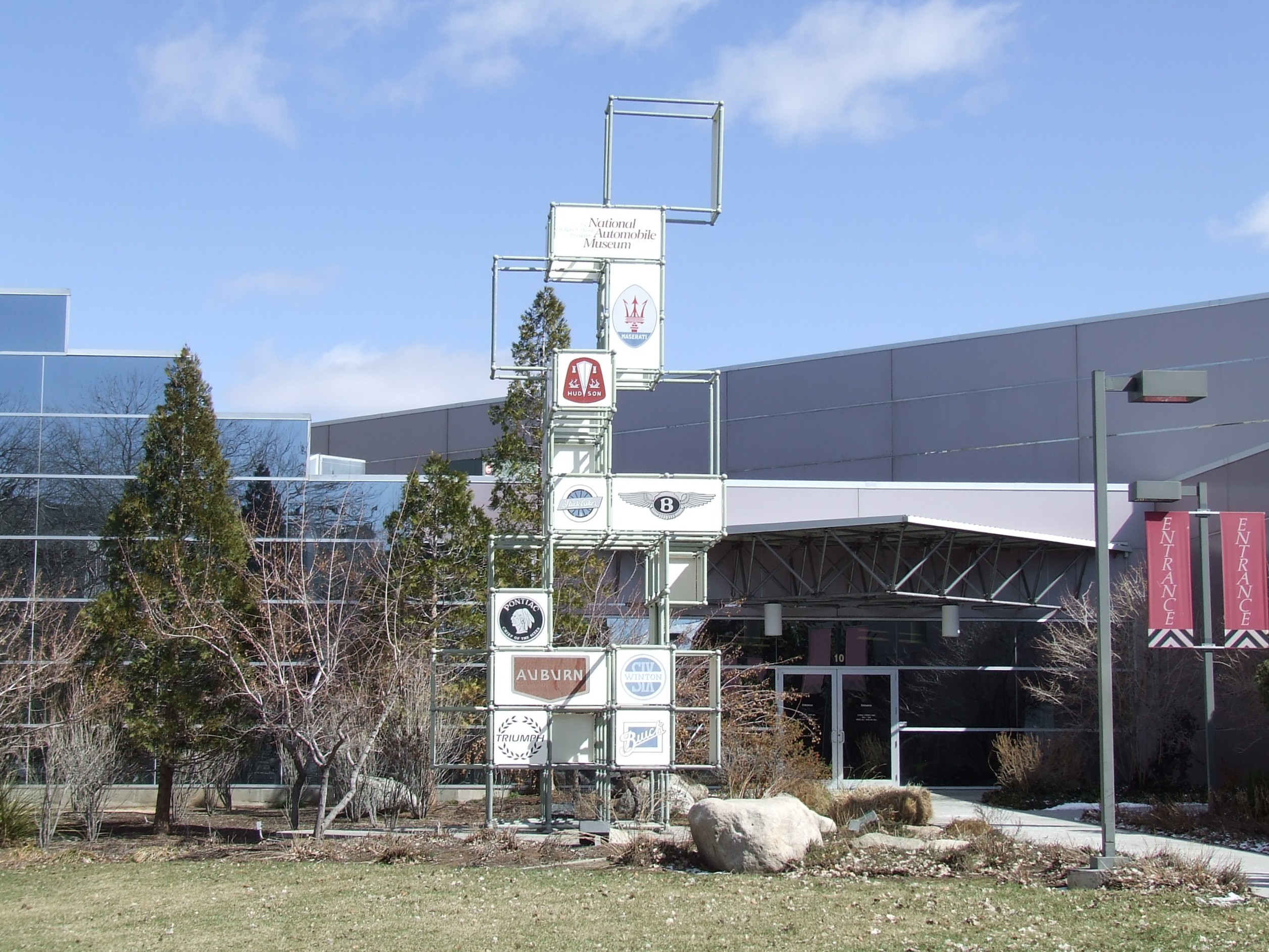
- Established: November 5, 1989; 36 years ago
- Location: Reno, Nevada, U.S.
- Coordinates: 39.52586°N 119.80960°W
- Type: Automobile museum
- Collection size: 200+ cars Automotive Research Library
- Website: automuseum.org

The National Automobile Museum is a museum in Reno, Nevada. Most of the vehicles displayed are from the collection of William F. Harrah. The museum opened on November 5, 1989.

== History ==
William F. Harrah collected approximately 1,450 automobiles, which he stored inside warehouses in Sparks, Nevada. It was the world's largest collection of historic automobiles, and was open to the public. When Harrah died in 1978, Holiday Inn acquired his hotel-casino company and the automobile collection. In 1981, Holiday Inn announced that it would sell the entire collection, a decision that received some opposition. Nevada governor Robert List attempted to delay the sale while working on a plan to have the state enact legislation that would save the collection. Businessman Thomas Perkins led a group that was interested in purchasing the collection. Both efforts to save the collection failed. However, a nonprofit organization was formed that ultimately built the museum. Holiday Inn donated 175 of Harrah's automobiles to the group and sold the rest of the collection through three auctions in the mid-1980s. Private owners donated another 60 vehicles. The museum opened on November 5, 1989 in downtown Reno, Nevada.

== Collection ==
The museum has over 200 cars spread over four galleries. Gallery 1 showcases cars built during the 1890s & 1900s, Gallery 2 features cars from the 1910s to 1930s, Gallery 3 the 1930s through to the 1950s, and Gallery 4 displays cars from 1950 onward. Gallery 4 also includes race cars. Each gallery is linked by a themed "street", featuring vehicles as well as faux shop fronts.

Celebrity owned cars include:

- Elvis Presley's 1973 Cadillac Eldorado,
- Frank Sinatra's 1961 Ghia L6.4,
- John F. Kennedy assigned 1962 Lincoln Continental,
- John Wayne's 1953 Chevrolet Corvette.

Movie featured cars include:

- 1892 Philion Road Carriage, from The Magnificent Ambersons,
- 1912 Rambler 73-400 Cross-Country, from the 1997 version of Titanic,
- 1949 Mercury Eight, driven by James Dean in Rebel Without a Cause.

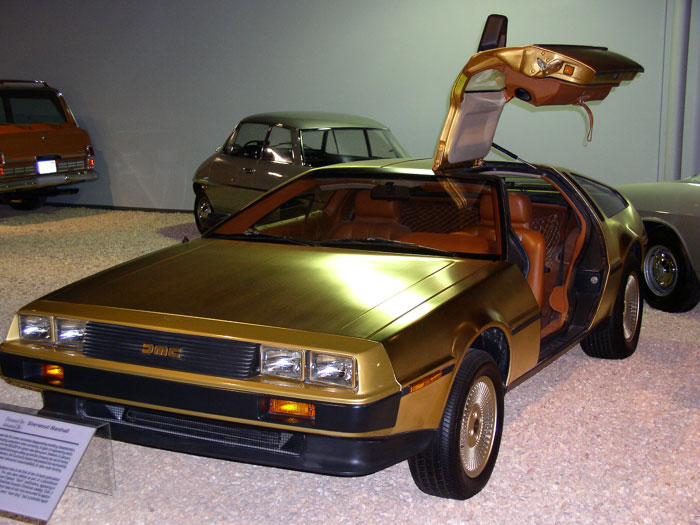
The Golden DeLorean at the National Automobile Museum

The collection includes examples from marques such as: Auburn, Bugatti, Cord, Duesenberg, Ferrari, Franklin, Jaguar, K-R-I-T, McLaren, Mercedes-Benz, Pierce-Arrow, Porsche, Rolls-Royce, and Stutz.

Also on display is one of three 24kt gold plated DeLoreans built for American Express, a "Jerrari", a Jeep Wagoneer fitted with a V-12 Ferrari engine and formerly used for winter driving by William F. Harrah, and the only surviving prototype of Buckminster Fuller's Dymaxion car. The one-of-a-kind Phantom Corsair is also displayed at the museum.

In addition, the prototype of the Aero Car, which was planned to use a two-cycle engine to drive a propeller, is on display.

The museum has been named in the 'Top Ten Museums' by Car Collector magazine, one of "America's Five Greatest Automobile Museums" and one of the top sixteen auto museums in the world by AutoWeek, and has been repeatedly selected as the best museum in Northern Nevada by Nevada Magazine's annual reader's poll.
