= Jerrari =

American custom built automobiles

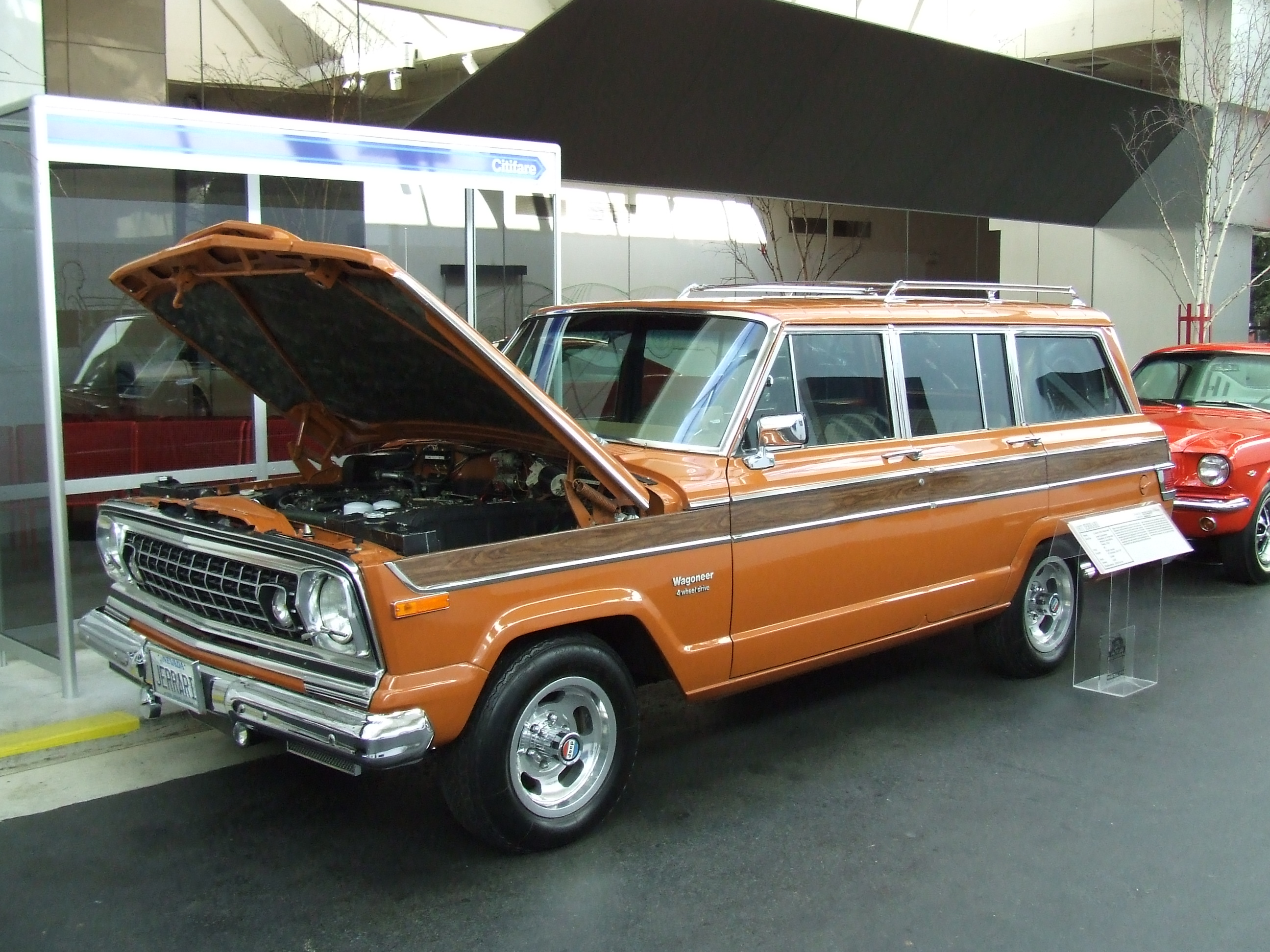
The 1977 Jerrari at the National Automobile Museum

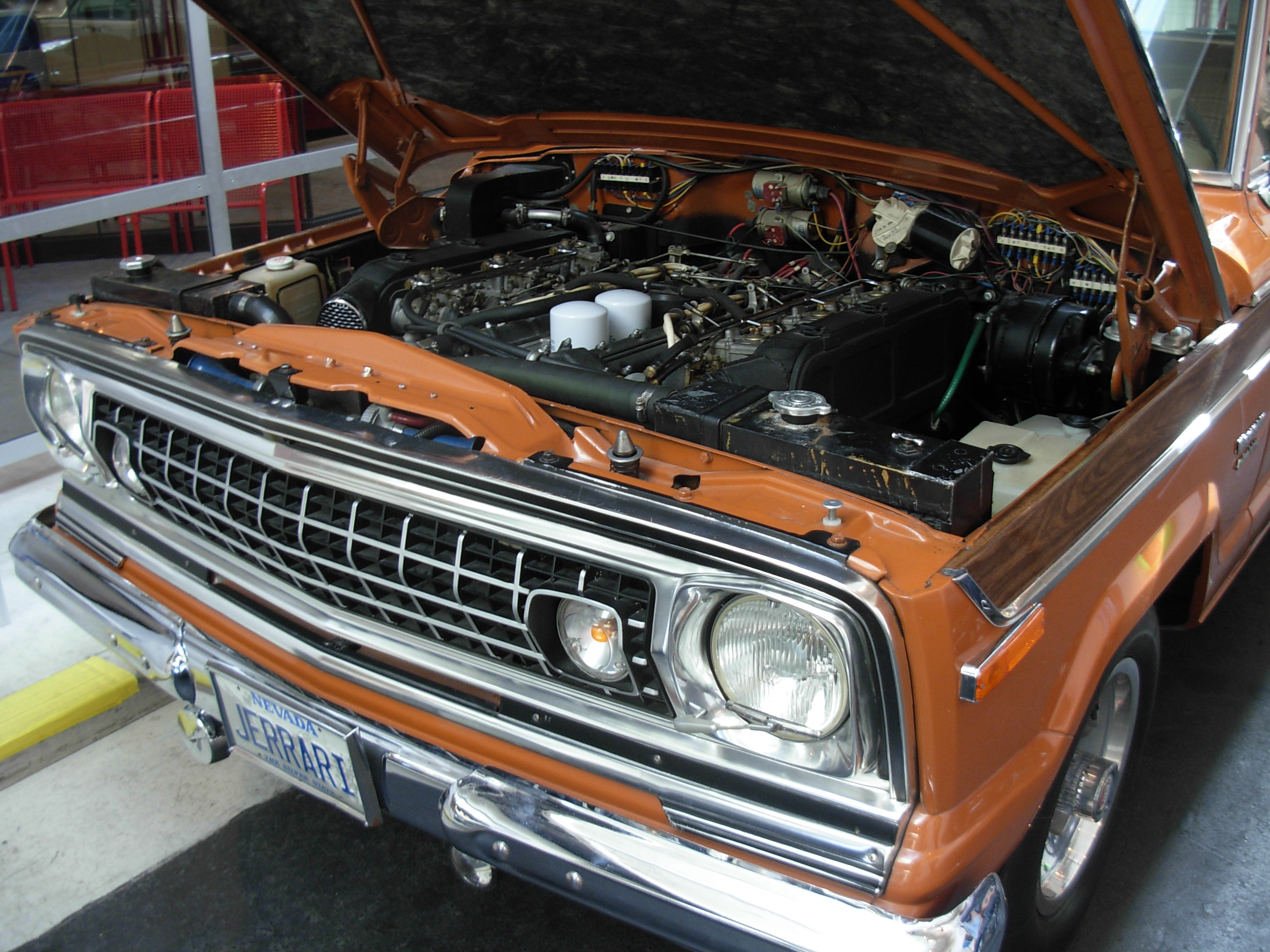
View of the Ferrari V12 in the 1977 Jerrari

The Jerrari Wagoneers are a pair of 1969 and 1977 Jeep Wagoneers built for William Fisk Harrah, founder of Harrah's Hotel and Casinos, that have had their stock 360 cu in (5.9 L) AMC V8 engines replaced with a 4.4 liter V12 engine and 5-speed manual transmission from a Ferrari 365 GT. Both Jerrari Wagoneers have received considerable publicity in books and magazines, including Road & Track, Forza magazine, 365 Cars You Must Drive, and Stars, Cars and Infamy.

== Origin ==
The Jerrari idea came after Bill Harrah had requested that Enzo Ferrari build a four-wheel drive Ferrari and Enzo refused. Harrah then commissioned the first Jerrari to be built by combining a 1969 Jeep Grand Wagoneer with the engine, transmission, and front end from a Ferrari 365 GT. Harrah used the finished car for transportation between his casinos in Reno and Lake Tahoe. He later commissioned the second Jerrari to be built for the same purpose, although this time keeping the original Jeep bodywork intact.

== 1969 Jerrari ==
The 1969 Jerrari Wagoneer had the entire front end from a Ferrari 365 GT grafted onto the stock Wagoneer body in addition to the Ferrari's engine and transmission. The latter was later removed from the car and used in the 1977 Jerrari.

The car received mixed reviews from the press regarding the looks of the car, with some even saying it was "a crime against nature". The 1969 Jerrari was posted on eBay in May 2008 with a Chevy 350 V8 in place of the original Ferrari V12. Bidding exceeded $21,000.

== 1977 Jerrari ==
The 1977 Jerrari Wagoneer's exterior was kept mostly original, with only minor changes such as headlight wipers, a bumper-mounted ice alert system, custom emblems, and license plates, the original quad-tip exhaust from the Ferrari donor car and lengthened front sheet-metal to be able to accommodate the engine. The interior received a few minor changes as well, including a Ferrari steering wheel, aftermarket gauge cluster, power mirrors, and a radar detector. The defining change, as before, was the addition of the 4.4 liter Ferrari V12 engine and 5-speed manual transmission taken from the 1969 Jerrari replacing the Jeep's standard 360 cu in (5.9 L) AMC V8 engine and automatic transmission. The 1977 Jerrari is on permanent display at the National Automobile Museum in Reno, Nevada.
