= William F. Harrah =

American businessman

- Born: William Fisk Harrah; September 2, 1911; South Pasadena, California, U.S.
- Died: June 30, 1978 (aged 66); Rochester, Minnesota, U.S.
- Resting place: Hailey Cemetery; Hailey, Idaho, U.S.
- Education: University of California, Los Angeles (did not graduate)
- Occupations: Founder, Harrah's Hotel and Casinos
- Spouses: Thelma Batchelor (m. 1940; div. 1948); Scherry Teague (m. 1948; div. 1969); Bobbie Gentry (m. 1969; div. 1970); Mary Burger (m. 1970; div. 1971); Roxana Carlson (m. 1972; div. 1973); Verna Rae Harrison (m. 1974)

William Fisk Harrah (September 2, 1911 – June 30, 1978) was an American businessman and the founder of Harrah's Hotel and Casinos, now part of Caesars Entertainment.

== Early years and education ==
Harrah was born in South Pasadena, California, the son of attorney and politician John Harrah.

Harrah studied mechanical engineering at UCLA where he was a member of the Phi Delta Theta fraternity. Harrah was forced to drop out of college because of the Great Depression. He worked at various family businesses including a pool hall, a hot dog stand, a shooting gallery, and a bingo-style operation called the "Circle" or "Reno Game."

== Gaming beginnings ==
Bingo was illegal in California, but games of skill based on bingo were legal. The Reno Game (later called the Circle Game) involved rolling a ball down a board where it would register a card suit and number. If one of the 33 players seated in a circle around the board matched a four-card sequence, he or she won, unless they were a shill and, working for the house. (The use of shills to fill the games upset players, but John Harrah felt they were necessary.)

The Reno Game was shut down several times by local authorities, but each time, lawyer John Harrah would get his permit reinstated. Still, the cost of doing business was high. When twenty-year-old Bill told his father he should get rid of the shills and put more money into the business, John challenged him to run the operation by himself. Bill said, "Dad, that would suit me just fine," and paid his father $500 for the business. He then headed down to the pier and fired the shills.

In the course of just three years Harrah made the $100-a-week game into a $25,000 per year business. However, Harrah grew tired of fighting the politicians and wanted to expand his operations into Reno. On October 29, 1937, he opened his first club at 124 North Center Street, called Harrah's Club Bingo. The location was two blocks from the Bank Club and Palace Club that had dominated gaming in Reno.

=== Building the business ===
As the locals expected, his tiny Tango bingo parlor closed up fast, lasting only until November the 15th. In July 1938 Harrah opened another bingo parlor, this time closer to the action, called Harrah's Plaza Tango. Virgil Smith was the main financier and a partner in the operation, and also in the club that opened in 1938, called the Plaza Tango at 14 East Commercial Row. Two months later Harrah found a better location at 242 North Virginia Street, close to Harolds Club, called Ed Howe's Tango Club.

After a meeting with Nick Abelman, Bill Graham, and Jim McKay, Harrah waited to be accepted into the Reno gaming fraternity. Eventually, Cal Custer, a respected ex-bootlegger and a long-time confidant of John Harrah, stood up for Bill. His new business ventures were given the green light, after a cash payment was made.

Ed Howe wanted $25,000 for his Tango Club, but accepted just $3,000. Over time, Harrah tried other locations and expanded his casino on Virginia Street several times. A hotel tower opened in 1969.

At Lake Tahoe, Harrah purchased George's Gateway Club in 1955 to expand his empire. Harrah-owned properties included the Lake Club on the lake side of highway 50, Harrah's Tahoe, on the mountain side at the old Stateline Country Club. The hotel tower opened in 1973. Harrah also owned the Zephyr Cove restaurant past Cave Rock which offered slots and blackjack.

Harrah expanded to Las Vegas in 1973 by purchasing the Holiday Casino on the Las Vegas Strip from Shelby and Claudine Williams. The property was close to the successful Sands Casino and across from where the Mirage now stands.

== Influence ==
Harrah used his influence to create the Nevada Gaming Control Board in 1955, an organization designed to regulate gaming in Nevada. In 1959, Harrah helped create an even stronger Gaming Commission to rid the state's casinos of corruption.

Harrah was known for his relations with both his customers and employees. The main theater in Harrah's Reno, originally called the Headliner Room, was renamed Sammy's Showroom after entertainer Sammy Davis Jr. (whose Duesenberg replica now resides in the museum that bears Harrah's name), and actor-comedian Bill Cosby recalls Harrah as a good friend.

== Personal life ==
Harrah was married seven times to six women, including a four-month marriage to the singer-songwriter Bobbie Gentry in 1969; the sugar baby relationship was alluded to in Gentry's fictionalized account of her life, "Fancy," in which a "benevolent man" (Harrah) takes in an impoverished Southern prostitute (Gentry).

With ex-wife Scherry (whom he married twice), he adopted two boys named John and Tony. His widow, Verna, worked as a film producer on such features as Anaconda.

== Car collection ==
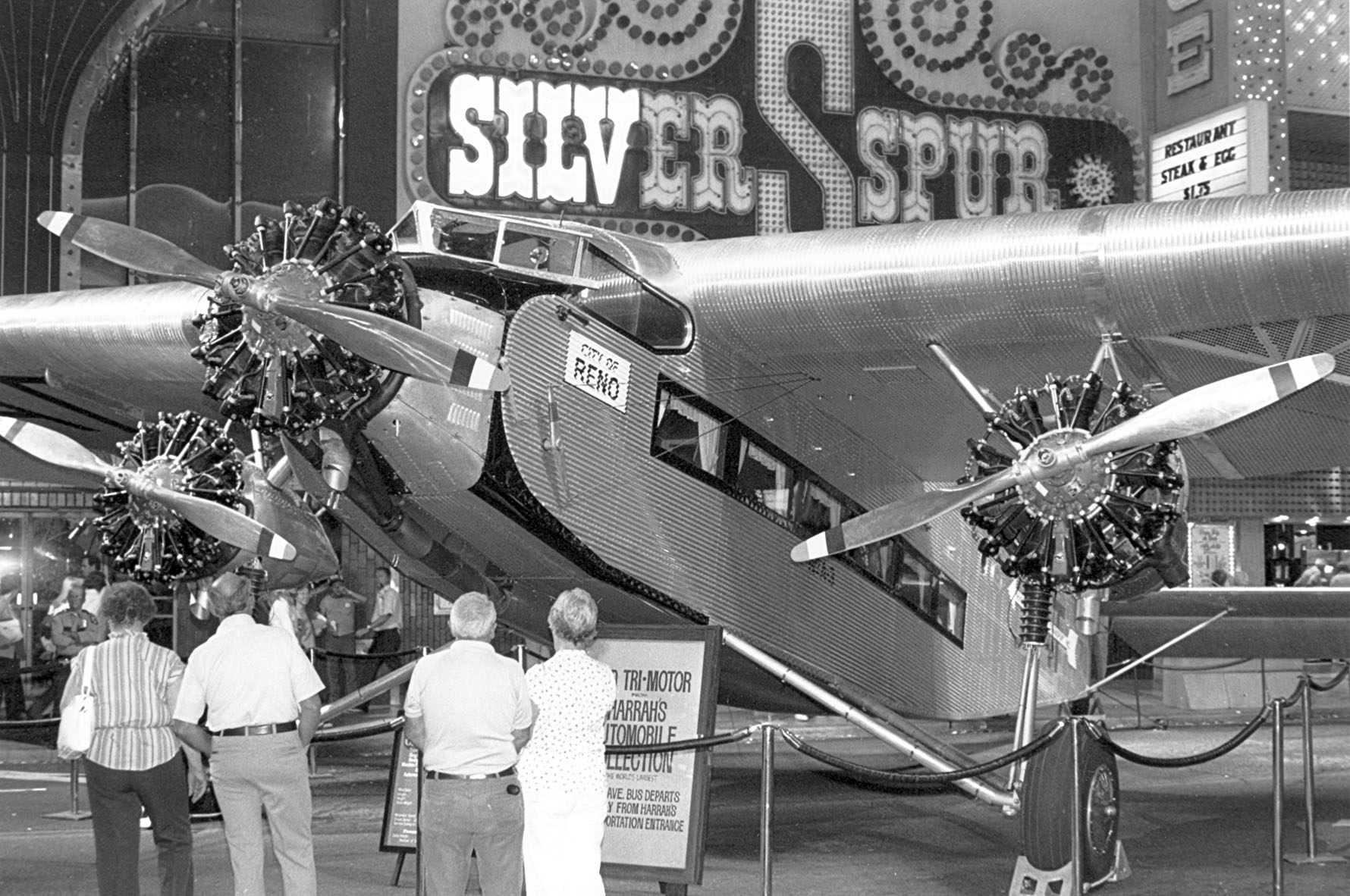
Ford Trimotor NC9645, the aircraft owned by Harrah, on display in Reno in 1983

When the car his father bought him was stolen and stripped, Harrah vowed to his sister that one day he would own a duplicate of every automobile the family had ever owned.

Harrah had an extensive collection of cars. Many of his cars enjoyed 'best' or 'one-of-a kind' status. Some notable items of his collection were the two Bugatti Type 41s, the Phantom Corsair, two Ferraris and a pair of Jerrari Wagoneers. In 1966 his Bugatti Type 41 Coupe de Ville won Best of Show at Pebble Beach Concours d'Elegance. He also won the competition in 1963, 1964 and 1976. As well as cars, Harrah owned a Ford Trimotor, early airliner.

After Bill Harrah's death, Holiday Corp, then parent of Holiday Inn, acquired Harrah's, including the car collection. The bulk of the collection was sold at several auctions between 1984 and 1986, garnering more than $100 million. An outcry by the people of Reno and Sparks led to Holiday Inn donating 175 vehicles to establish the William F. Harrah Automobile Museum in downtown Reno, Nevada. Some of the cars were donated to form the Imperial Palace Auto Collection in Las Vegas.

== Death ==
Harrah died at the Mayo Clinic Hospital in Rochester, Minnesota, at the age of 66, during a cardiac surgery operation to repair an aortic aneurysm. He left an estate valued at $138 million which was split into two trusts, one for his wife Verna and one for his sons.

== Legacy ==
The William F. Harrah College of Hotel Administration at the University of Nevada, Las Vegas, which opened in 1967, was renamed in his honor in 1989, in recognition of a $5 million gift from his widow.

Harrah also used the sport of unlimited hydroplane racing to promote his businesses. In 1962, he purchased Maverick, a champion boat, and renamed it Harrah's Tahoe Miss. In 1966, his third Tahoe Miss won five races, including the APBA Gold Cup, and was the national champion, driven by the late pilot Mira Slovak. In 1968, the boat's name was changed to Harrah's Club to further promote his casino holdings.
