= K-R-I-T Motor Car Company =

Former american car manufacturer 1909 to 1916

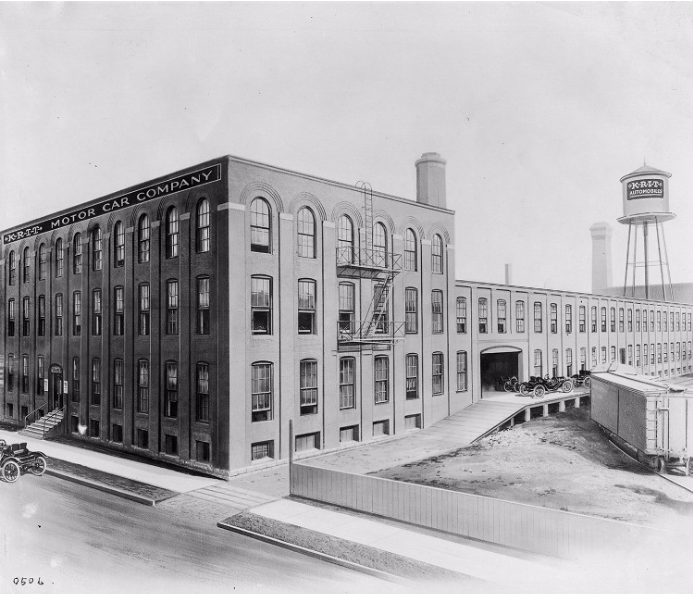
- Krit Motor Car Company factory located at 1608 East Grand Boulevard
- Type: Automobile Manufacturing
- Industry: Automotive
- Genre: Touring cars, roadsters
- Founded: 1909; 117 years ago
- Defunct: 1916; 110 years ago
- Headquarters: Detroit, Michigan, United States
- Area served: United States
- Products: Vehicles; Automotive parts

K-R-I-T (or simply "Krit") was a small automobile manufacturing company (1909–1916) based in Detroit, Michigan.

== History ==
Krit Motor Car Company's name probably originated from Kenneth Crittenden, who provided financial backing and helped design the cars. The emblem of the cars was a swastika (a symbol that was not yet associated with Nazism, Nazi Germany, Adolf Hitler, or antisemitism) which was popular at the time.

Krit occupied two different sites during its history: the first one it took over from the Blomstrom car, and in 1911 moved to the works that had been used by R. M. Owen & Company who had moved to become Owen Magnetic.

In 1911 the KRIT Motor Company was purchased by Walter S Russel of the Russel Wheel and Foundry Company.

The cars were conventional 4-cylinder models and many were exported to Europe and Australia. In 1913 a six-cylinder car was introduced and Krit tried to increase sales by engineering cars for other marques. The outbreak of World War I seriously damaged the company and it failed in 1915. A few cars were subsequently assembled from remaining parts.

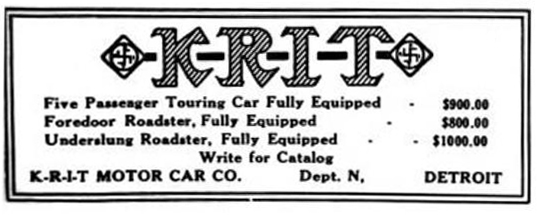
1912 KRIT motor car Advertisement

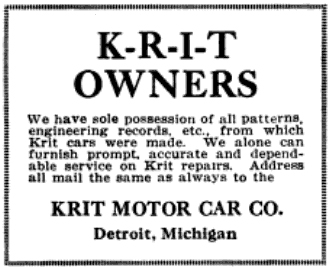
1917 KRIT Motor Car Co. - Patterns available

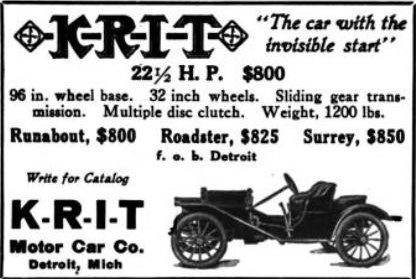
1911 Krit Advertising

Krit Model KR (1913)

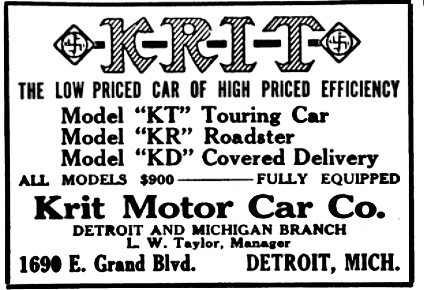
1914 Krit Advertising

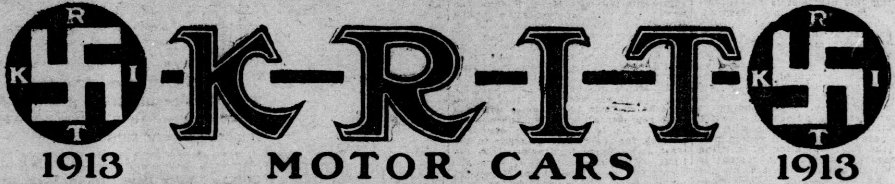
Logo prominently showing the swastika emblem

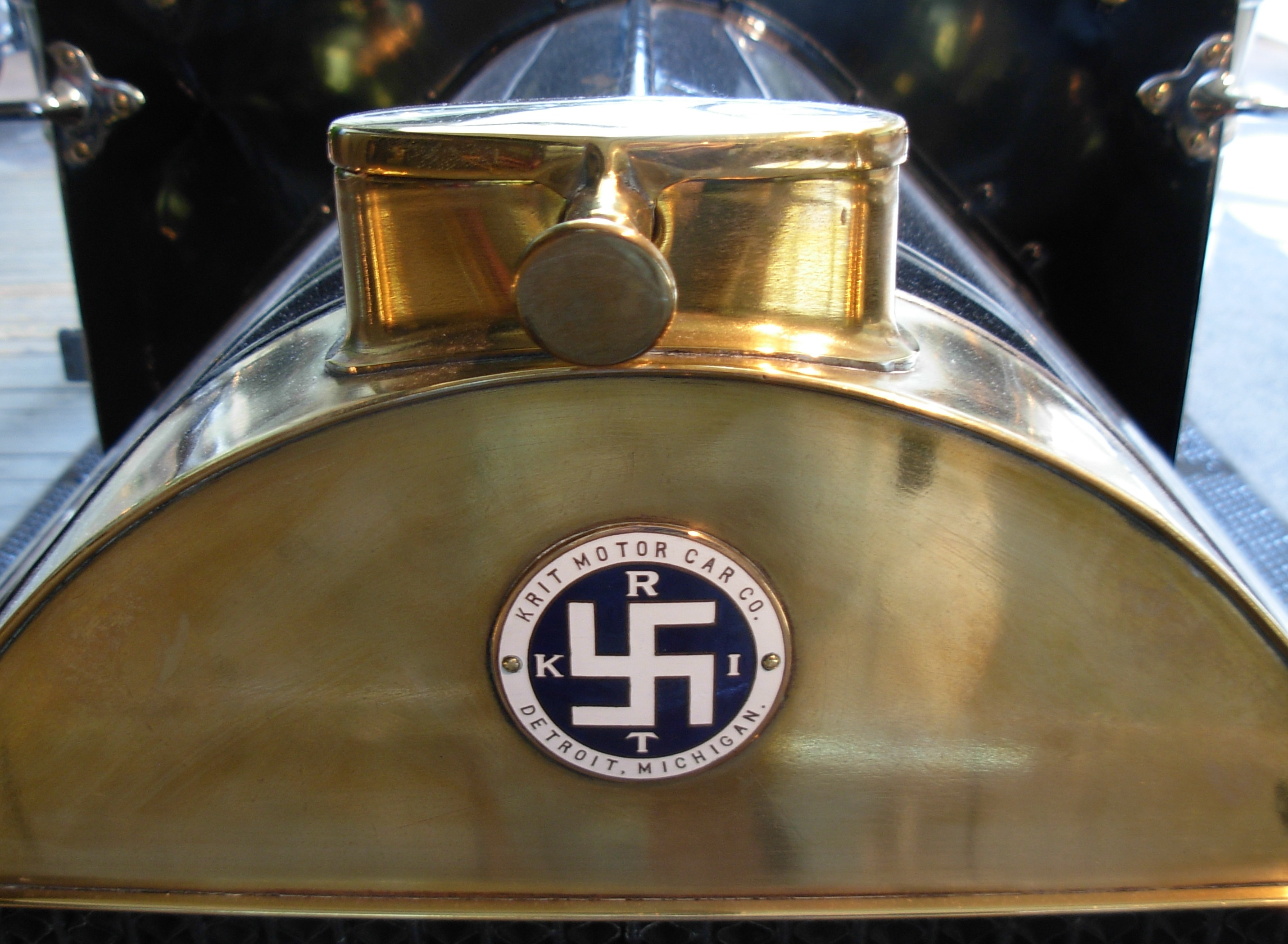
swastika on car in National Automobile Museum

== See also ==
- 1913 K-R-I-T "KT" 5-Passenger Touring at the National Automobile Museum.
