= Timeline of the Joe Biden presidency (2023 Q4) =

The following is a timeline of the presidency of Joe Biden during the fourth quarter of 2023, from October 1 to December 31, 2023. For a complete itinerary of his travels, see List of presidential trips made by Joe Biden (2022). To navigate between quarters, see timeline of the Joe Biden presidency.

== Timeline ==
=== October 2023 ===
Date	Events	Photos/videos
Sunday, October 1		
Monday, October 2		
Tuesday, October 3	Speaker of the House Kevin McCarthy is removed through a motion to vacate.; Vice President Harris swears in Laphonza Butler to the United States Senate, succeeding the late Dianne Feinstein.	Senator Butler is sworn in by Vice President Harris
Wednesday, October 4		
Thursday, October 5		
Friday, October 6	President Biden holds a bilateral meeting with German President Frank-Walter Steinmeier at the White House on German-American Day.	President Biden and German President Frank-Walter Steinmeier
Saturday, October 7	President Biden condemns the Hamas attacks in Israel, saying that he is ready to offer "all appropriate means of support to the Government and people of Israel".	President Biden delivers remarks on the Hamas attacks in Israel
Sunday, October 8		
Monday, October 9		
Tuesday, October 10	At the White House, President Biden delivers remarks on the terrorist attacks in Israel. In a speech, the Democrat says that his administration will provide additional military assistance to Israel, which has since declared war on Hamas.; President Biden solidifies United States support for Israel and its right to defend itself.	President Biden delivers remarks on the Hamas attacks in Israel
Wednesday, October 11	President Biden meets with Jewish community leaders in the White House in the aftermath of Hamas' attack on Israel.	President Biden meets with Jewish Community leaders
Thursday, October 12	Secretary of State Antony Blinken visits Israel to express strong solidarity, but he also urges protection of Palestinian civilians in Gaza.	
Friday, October 13	President Biden meets virtually with relatives of American citizens held hostage in Gaza.; Following his brief visit to Israel, Secretary of State Antony Blinken meets with the Palestinian Authority President, Mahmoud Abbas, in Amman, Jordania. This is reportedly the first face-to-face meeting between a US official and the Palestinian Authority's leader since the Hamas' attack on Israel started on 7 October 2023.	President Biden meets virtually with relatives of Americans held hostage
Saturday, October 14	President Biden delivers remarks at the Human Rights Campaign national dinner.	President Biden at the Human Rights Campaign national dinner
Sunday, October 15		
Monday, October 16		
Tuesday, October 17	No candidates in the October 2023 Speaker of the United States House of Representatives election reach the threshold of 217 needed to be elected speaker after first round of voting. Democrat Hakeem Jeffries leads the ballot with 212 votes.; At morning, Secretary of State Antony Blinken talks with Israeli Prime Minister Benjamin Netanyahu in Tel Aviv.	
Wednesday, October 18	No candidates in the October 2023 Speaker of the United States House of Representatives election reach the threshold of 217 needed to be elected speaker after second round of voting. Democrat Hakeem Jeffries leads the ballot with 212 votes.; President Biden travels to Tel Aviv to express support for Israel in the Gaza war, meeting with Prime Minister Benjamin Netanyahu and first responders and victims impacted by the Hamas attacks.; President Biden announces a deal to allow humanitarian aid to enter Gaza, after a call with Egyptian President Abdel Fattah el-Sisi.; The United States vetoes a United Nations Security Council resolution calling for Israel to allow humanitarian assistance into the Gaza Strip.	President Biden and Israeli Prime Minister Benjamin Netanyahu
Thursday, October 19	President Biden addresses the nation on prime-time television in the Oval Office for a second time concerning the ongoing Gaza and Ukraine wars.	President Biden addresses the nation on the Gaza and Ukraine wars
Friday, October 20	No candidates in the October 2023 Speaker of the United States House of Representatives election reach the threshold needed to be elected speaker after third round of voting. Democrat Hakeem Jeffries leads the ballot with 210 votes.	
Saturday, October 21		
Sunday, October 22		
Monday, October 23	Australian Prime Minister Anthony Albanese, accompanied by his wife Jodie Haydon, begins a four-day state visit to the US, the fourth during the Biden presidency.	
Tuesday, October 24	President Biden awards the National Medal of Science and National Medal of Technology and Innovation to 19 individuals.	President Biden delivers remarks
Wednesday, October 25	President Biden holds a bilateral meeting and joint press conference with Australian Prime Minister Anthony Albanese at the White House.; President Biden and First Lady Jill Biden host their fourth state dinner in honor of Australian Prime Minister Anthony Albanese and his wife, Jodie Haydon.; Republican Mike Johnson is elected as Speaker of the United States House of Representatives after 4 rounds of voting, which previous 3 rounds were all failed to elect Republican Jim Jordan as Speaker.	President Biden and First Lady Jill Biden with Australian Prime Minister Anthony Albanese and Jodie Haydon
Thursday, October 26	Vice President Harris and Secretary Blinken host a state luncheon for Prime Minister Albanese at the Department of State.; Incumbent U.S. Representative Dean Phillips filed paperwork to run against President Biden for the Democratic nomination for president.	From left: Evan Ryan, Antony Blinken, Jodie Haydon, Anthony Albanese, Kamala Harris, and Doug Emhoff at the Department of State
Friday, October 27		
Saturday, October 28		
Sunday, October 29	In an interview with CBS, Vice President Kamala Harris that US troops will not be sent to Israel or Gaza.	
Monday, October 30	President Biden and First Lady Jill Biden participate in the 2023 White House Halloween event.	President Biden and First Lady Jill Biden at a Halloween event
Tuesday, October 31	President Biden issues a sweeping executive order to regulate the development of artificial intelligence (AI) amid growing concern about its potential impact on everything from national security to public health.	

=== November 2023 ===
Date	Events	Photos/videos
Wednesday, November 1	Vice President Harris attends the 2023 AI Safety Summit in the United Kingdom.	Vice President Harris delivering remarks at the 2023 AI Safety Summit
Thursday, November 2	President Biden holds a bilateral meeting with Dominican Republic President Luis Abinader at the White House.; President Biden holds a bilateral meeting with Chilean President Gabriel Boric at the White House.	President Biden and Dominican Republic President Luis Abinader President Biden and Chilean President Gabriel Boric
Friday, November 3	President Biden hosts the inaugural Americas Partnership for Economic Prosperity Leaders' Summit at the White House.; President Biden and First Lady Jill Biden visit Lewiston, Maine to honor the victims of the mass shooting.	President Biden with national leaders of Latin America at the White House President Biden and First Lady Jill Biden at a memorial in Lewiston, Maine
Saturday, November 4		
Sunday, November 5		
Monday, November 6	President Biden announces $16.4 billion funding from the Infrastructure Investment and Jobs Act for passenger rail improvement projects on the Northeast Corridor in Bear, Delaware.	President Biden delivers remarks
Tuesday, November 7	Vice President Harris holds an early Diwali celebration at Number One Observatory Circle.	
Wednesday, November 8	The United States House of Representatives issues subpoenas to Hunter and James Biden, President Joe Biden's son and brother.	
Thursday, November 9		
Friday, November 10		
Saturday, November 11	President Biden performs a wreath-laying ceremony at the Tomb of the Unknown Soldier at the Arlington National Cemetery and delivers the Veterans Day address at the Memorial Amphitheater. Vice President Kamala Harris also attends. This is the first appearance together since the election.	President Biden, Vice President Harris and Secretary McDonough at Arlington National Cemetery
Sunday, November 12		
Monday, November 13	President Biden holds a bilateral meeting with Indonesian President Joko Widodo at the White House.	President Biden and Indonesian President Joko Widodo
Tuesday, November 14		
Wednesday, November 15	President Biden meets with Chinese President and CCP General Secretary Xi Jinping in San Francisco on the sidelines of APEC United States 2023.	President Biden and Chinese leader Xi Jinping
Thursday, November 16	President Biden hosts leaders for the APEC summit meeting in San Francisco.; President Biden and fellow Indo-Pacific Economic Framework (IPEF) leaders announce that agreement has been reached on three of the four IPEF pillars.; President Biden holds a trilateral meeting with Japanese Prime Minister Fumio Kishida and South Korean President Yoon Suk Yeol.	President Biden with APEC leaders President Biden with IPEF leaders
Friday, November 17	President Biden holds a bilateral meeting with Mexican President Andrés Manuel López Obrador in San Francisco.	President Biden and Mexican President Andres Manuel Lopez Obrador
Saturday, November 18	President Biden publishes an op-ed with The Washington Post, writing about the ongoing Russian invasion of Ukraine and Gaza war.	
Sunday, November 19	President Biden and First Lady Jill Biden travel to Norfolk to celebrate a "Friendsgiving" with military personnel and families.	President Biden and First Lady Jill Biden at Naval Station Norfolk
Monday, November 20	President Biden celebrates his 81st birthday and participates in the National Thanksgiving Turkey Presentation.; First Lady Jill Biden welcomes the arrival of the 2023 White House Christmas Tree at the White House.	President Biden celebrates his 81st birthday President Biden delivers remarks at the National Thanksgiving Turkey Presentation
Tuesday, November 21		
Wednesday, November 22		
Thursday, November 23	President Biden celebrates his third Thanksgiving with his family's traditional trip in Nantucket, Massachusetts.	President Biden in Nantucket, Massachusetts
Friday, November 24		
Saturday, November 25		
Sunday, November 26		
Monday, November 27	First Lady Jill Biden unveils the White House holiday decor for the third time.; In a statement during the first meeting of the new White House Council on Strengthening Production Chains, the White House reports that the government of the United States announces measures to strengthen production chains.	The White House Christmas Tree
Tuesday, November 28	President Biden and First Lady Jill Biden attend the memorial service for former First Lady Rosalynn Carter.	
Wednesday, November 29		
Thursday, November 30	President Biden holds a bilateral meeting with Angolan President João Lourenço at the White House.; President Biden and First Lady Jill Biden attend the National Christmas Tree Lighting outside of the White House.	President Biden and Angolan President João Lourenço President Biden at the National Christmas Tree Lighting

=== December 2023 ===
Date	Events	Photos/videos
Friday, December 1		
Saturday, December 2		
Sunday, December 3		
Monday, December 4		
Tuesday, December 5	President Biden delivers the statement at an event to raise money for the 2024 presidential campaign near the city of Boston.	
Wednesday, December 6	President Biden holds a virtual meeting with G7 leaders and Ukrainian President Volodymyr Zelenskyy.; President Biden attends the White House Tribal Nations Summit and signs an executive order to improve access to federal funding for tribal communities.	President Biden in a virtual meeting President Biden at the White House Tribal Nations Summit
Thursday, December 7	The United States Department of Justice says that Hunter Biden, the son of President Joe Biden, is charged with involvement in a scheme to avoid paying about $1.4 million in taxes between 2016 and 2019.	
Friday, December 8	The United States Department of State bypasses Congress to send thousands of munitions to Israel on an emergency basis.	
Saturday, December 9		
Sunday, December 10		
Monday, December 11	President Biden vows to continue arming Israel in its war with Hamas during a Hanukkah reception at the White House.	
Tuesday, December 12	President Biden holds a bilateral meeting and joint press conference with Ukrainian President Volodymyr Zelenskyy at the White House. This is Zelenskyy's third visit to the capital of the United States since the Russian invasion of Ukraine.; The United States votes against the a non-binding United Nations Security Council resolution demanding an "immediate humanitarian ceasefire" in Gaza.; President Biden says to donors during a fundraiser that Israel risks losing international support over its "indiscriminate bombing" of civilians in its war against Hamas in the Gaza Strip.	President Biden and Ukrainian President Volodymyr Zelenskyy
Wednesday, December 13	The House of Representatives votes to formally endorse the impeachment inquiry 221–212, mostly along partisan lines.	
Thursday, December 14		
Friday, December 15	United States Secretary of State Antony Blinken condemns Hong Kong authorities for announcing bounties against five pro-democracy activists based overseas, including a US citizen, calling on the international community to oppose "transnational repression".	
Saturday, December 16		
Sunday, December 17		
Monday, December 18		
Tuesday, December 19	President Biden attends the funeral of former Supreme Court Justice Sandra Day O'Connor at the Washington National Cathedral.	President Biden Delivers Remarks at a Memorial Service for Justice Sandra Day O'Connor
Wednesday, December 20		
Thursday, December 21		
Friday, December 22	President Biden commutes the sentences of 11 individuals serving time for nonviolent drug offenses and pardons additional marijuana offenses.; The United States abstains on a UN Security Council resolution that called on all parties involved "to authorize and facilitate the immediate, safe and unhindered delivery of large-scale humanitarian assistance" to Gaza.; President Biden and First Lady Jill Biden visit to Children's National Hospital in Washington to meet young patients and their families.	
Saturday, December 23	Democratic Congressman Dean Phillips calls for Biden to "thoughtfully exit" the 2024 race.	
Sunday, December 24		
Monday, December 25	President Biden celebrates the third Christmas Day of his administration.	President Biden and First Lady Jill Biden at Camp David on Christmas Day
Tuesday, December 26		
Wednesday, December 27	President Biden and First Lady Jill Biden travel to the US Virgin Islands, vacationing there until after the new year.	
Thursday, December 28	Hunter Biden, the son of US President Joe Biden, agrees to testify before the House Oversight Committee, but only in public.	
Friday, December 29	The Biden administration bypasses Congress to approve an emergency weapons sale to Israel. This is for the second time in a month.	
Saturday, December 30		
Sunday, December 31	President Biden celebrates the third New Year's Day countdown of his administration in the Virgin Islands.	

== See also ==
- First 100 days of the Biden presidency – Period from January to April 2021
- List of executive actions by Joe Biden
- Lists of presidential trips made by Joe Biden (international trips)
- Presidential transition of Joe Biden – Transfer of presidential power from Donald Trump to Joe Biden
- Timeline of the 2020 United States presidential election

== Notes ==
U.S. presidential administration timelines
Preceded by Biden presidency (2023 Q3)	Biden presidency (2023 Q4)	Succeeded by Biden presidency (2024 Q1)
