= List of presidential trips made by Joe Biden (2023) =

This is a list of presidential trips made by Joe Biden during 2023, the third year of his presidency as the 46th president of the United States.

This list excludes trips made within Washington, D.C., the U.S. federal capital in which the White House, the official residence and principal workplace of the president, is located. Also excluded are trips to Camp David, the country residence of the president, as well as Joint Base Andrews. International trips are included. The number of visits per state or territory where he traveled are:

- One: Alabama, Connecticut, Hawaii, Kentucky, Michigan, Mississippi, New Mexico, Ohio, South Carolina, Texas and Utah
- Two: Arizona, Colorado, Florida, Georgia, Illinois, Maine, Massachusetts, Minnesota, North Carolina and the U.S. Virgin Islands
- Three: Alaska and Wisconsin
- Four: Nevada
- Five: New York
- Seven: Virginia
- Eight: California
- Eleven: Maryland and Pennsylvania
- Thirty-one: Delaware

International

- (7 trips to 13 countries)

Locations in the contiguous United States that President Joe Biden has visited in 2023.

January (blue) – February (yellow) – March (brown) – April (pink) – May (grey) – June (orange) – July (purple) – August (light blue) – September (magenta) – October (green) – November (red) –

December (light green)
Locations in Alaska that President Joe Biden has visited.
Locations in Hawaii that President Joe Biden has visited.
Locations in US Virgin Islands that President Joe Biden has visited.

== January ==
| Country/ U.S. state | Areas visited | Dates | Details | Image |
|---|---|---|---|---|
| U.S. Virgin Islands | St. Croix | January 1–2 | President Biden, First Lady Jill Biden, their daughter Ashley Biden, their granddaughter Natalie and their grandson Hunter continued their vacation in St. Croix for New Year's Holiday. On Sunday, President Biden attended Mass at Holy Cross Catholic Church. | |
| Kentucky | Covington | January 4 | Arriving via Cincinnati/Northern Kentucky International Airport, President Biden delivered remarks on his economic plan and rebuilding infrastructure at the Brent Spence Bridge He was joined by senators Mitch McConnell and Sherrod Brown, former senator Rob Portman, Kentucky governor Andy Beshear and Ohio governor Mike DeWine. | |
| Ohio | Cincinnati | January 4 | President Biden stopped by at Just Q'in BBQ for lunch following his remarks on his economic plan and rebuilding infrastructure. He was joined by Senator Sherrod Brown and Cincinnati Mayor Aftab Pureval. | |
| Delaware | Wilmington, Greenville | January 6–8 | Arriving via Wilmington-New Castle Airport on Marine One, President Biden visited his Delaware home for the weekend. On Saturday, he attended Mass at St. Joseph on the Brandywine in Greenville. On Sunday, he returned to St. Joseph on the Brandywine to visited the burial site of his mother Catherine Eugenia Finnegan on the 13th anniversary of her death. | |
| Texas | El Paso | January 8 | Arriving via El Paso International Airport, President Biden visited the US–Mexico border wall in El Paso. He also personally inspected at the Bridge of the Americas and then visited the El Paso County Migrant Services Center. | |
| Mexico | Mexico City | January 8–10 | Arriving via Felipe Ángeles International Airport, President Biden spent the night at InterContinental Presidente. On January 9, President Biden held a bilateral meeting with President Andrés Manuel López Obrador. Then, he and First Lady Jill Biden participated in a trilateral dinner with President López Obrador along with First Lady Dr. Beatriz Gutiérrez Müller and Canadian prime minister Justin Trudeau with his wife Sophie Grégoire Trudeau at the National Palace. On January 10, President Biden held a bilateral meeting with Canadian prime minister Justin Trudeau and attended the 10th North American Leaders' Summit. | |
| Maryland | Bethesda | January 11 | President Biden flew on Marine One to Walter Reed National Military Medical Center to accompany First Lady Jill Biden for her skin cancer removal surgery. | |
| Delaware | Wilmington, Greenville | January 13–15 | Arriving via Wilmington-New Castle Airport on Marine One, President Biden visited his Delaware home for Martin Luther King Jr. Day weekend. On Saturday, he attended Mass at St. Joseph on the Brandywine in Greenville. | |
| Georgia | Atlanta | January 15 | Arriving via Hartsfield–Jackson Atlanta International Airport, President Biden delivered remarks on Martin Luther King Jr. Day at Ebenezer Baptist Church. He was joined by Senator Raphael Warnock. | |
| Delaware | Wilmington | January 15–16 | Arriving via Wilmington-New Castle Airport, President Biden returned to Wilmington to spend the remainder of Martin Luther King Jr. Day weekend at his Delaware home. On Monday, he attended a viewing to paid his respects for a longtime family friend Rev. Monsignor J. Thomas Cini at St. Elizabeth Roman Catholic Church. | |
| California | Capitola, Aptos | January 19 | Arriving via Moffett Federal Airfield and flying to Watsonville Municipal Airport on Marine One, President Biden visited and surveyed the damage from severe flooding. He was joined by California governor Gavin Newsom and they met with business owners and local residents impacted by the devastation from recent storms at Capitola Pier. They also visited first responders, state and local officials to survey recovery efforts and delivered remarks on the recovery and rebuilding from the impact of recent extreme weather at Seacliff State Park. | |
| Delaware | Rehoboth Beach | January 20–23 | Arriving via Cape Henlopen State Park on Marine One, President Biden visited his Delaware beach home for the weekend. On Saturday, he attended Mass at St. Edmond Catholic Church. | |
| Virginia | Springfield | January 26 | President Biden delivered remarks on the economic progress at Steamfitters Local 602. | |
| Delaware | Wilmington | January 29–30 | Flying from Camp David to Wilmington-New Castle Airport on Marine One, President Biden and First Lady Jill Biden visited their Delaware home for the remainder of weekend. | |
| Maryland | Baltimore | January 30 | Flying from Wilmington-New Castle Airport to Fort McHenry Landing Zone on Marine One, President Biden discussed on the Infrastructure Investment and Jobs Act at the Baltimore and Potomac Tunnel. He was joined by Transportation Secretary Pete Buttigieg and Maryland governor Wes Moore. | |
| New York | New York City | January 31 | Arriving via John F. Kennedy International Airport and flying to Manhattan Harbor on Marine One, President Biden discussed on the Infrastructure Investment and Jobs Act funding for the North River Tunnels at the West Side Yard. He then participated in a reception for the Democratic National Committee. | |

== February ==
| Country/ U.S. state | Areas visited | Dates | Details | Image |
|---|---|---|---|---|
| Pennsylvania | Philadelphia | February 3 | Arriving via Philadelphia International Airport, President Biden delivered remarks on the economic agenda that continues to deliver results for the American people at Belmont Water Treatment Center. He was joined by Vice President Kamala Harris. They both participated in a reception for the Democratic National Committee and also delivered remarks at the DNC Winter Meeting at Sheraton Philadelphia Hotel. | |
| Delaware | Wilmington | February 3–4 | Arriving via Wilmington-New Castle Airport, President Biden visited his Delaware home for the beginning of the weekend. | |
| New York | Syracuse | February 4 | Arriving via Hancock Field Air National Guard Base, President Biden and his son Hunter Biden visited a private residence following the death of President Biden's brother-in-law Michael E. Hunter who was the brother of his first wife Neilia Hunter Biden. Then, they traveled to Camp David via Hagerstown Regional Airport for the remainder of the weekend. | |
| Wisconsin | DeForest | February 8 | Arriving via Truax Field Air National Guard Base, President Biden discussed on economic plan, creating good-paying, union jobs and delivering real results for the American people at Liuna Training Center. | |
| Florida | Tampa | February 9 | Arriving via Tampa International Airport, President Biden discussed on Social Security, Medicare and lower healthcare costs at the University of Tampa. | |
| Maryland | Lanham | February 15 | President Biden delivered remarks on building an economy, lower costs, and reward work, not wealth while reducing the deficit at IBEW Local 26. | |
| Maryland | Bethesda | February 16 | President Biden flew on Marine One to Walter Reed National Military Medical Center for his annual physical examination. | |
| Germany | Rhineland-Palatinate | February 20 | President Biden briefly stopped at Ramstein Air Base as Air Force One was being refueled. | |
| Poland | Rzeszów, Przemyśl | February 20 | Arriving via Rzeszów–Jasionka Airport and traveling via motorcade to Przemyśl, President Biden took a train to Kyiv in an unannounced visit. | |
| Ukraine | Kyiv | February 20 | Arriving via train at Kyiv-Pasazhyrskyi railway station in an unannounced visit, President Biden met with President Volodymyr Zelenskyy and First Lady Olena Zelenska at the Mariinskyi Palace ahead of the first anniversary of the Russian invasion of Ukraine. Both of the leaders later visited St. Michael's Golden-Domed Monastery. President Biden also visited the U.S. Embassy. | |
| Poland | Przemyśl, Rzeszów, Warsaw | February 20–22 | In Przemyśl, President Biden arrived via train from Kyiv in Ukraine, then flew to Rzeszów–Jasionka Airport on Air Force One. In Warsaw, arriving via Warsaw Chopin Airport, President Biden spent the night at Marriott Hotel Warsaw. On February 21, President Biden held a meeting with President Andrzej Duda and Prime Minister Mateusz Morawiecki to discuss bilateral cooperation to support Ukraine and bolster NATO's deterrence at the Presidential Palace. Additionally, he also held a meeting with Moldovan president Maia Sandu. He delivered remarks on its first anniversary of the Russian invasion of Ukraine at the Gardens of the Royal Castle. On February 22, President Biden, along with NATO Secretary General Jens Stoltenberg, met with the leaders of the Bucharest Nine (B9) nations, excluding the prime minister of Hungary. | |
| Delaware | Wilmington, Greenville | February 24–27 | Arriving via Wilmington-New Castle Airport on Marine One, President Biden visited his Delaware home for the weekend. On Saturday, he attended Mass at St. Joseph on the Brandywine in Greenville. | |
| Pennsylvania | Kennett Square | February 25 | President Biden visited the residence of his younger sister Valerie Biden Owens in Kennett Square for dinner. He then returned to Wilmington. | |
| Virginia | Virginia Beach | February 28 | Arriving via Naval Air Station Oceana, President Biden discussed on his plan to protect American's access to affordable health care at Kempsville Recreation Center. | |

== March ==
| Country/ U.S. state | Areas visited | Dates | Details | Image |
|---|---|---|---|---|
| Maryland | Baltimore | March 1 | Arriving via Fort McHenry Landing Zone on Marine One, President Biden delivered remarks at the House Democratic Caucus Issues Conference at Hyatt Regency Baltimore Inner Harbor. | |
| Delaware | Wilmington, Greenville | March 3–5 | Arriving via Wilmington-New Castle Airport, President Biden visited his Delaware home for the weekend. On Saturday, he attended Mass at St. Joseph on the Brandywine in Greenville and visited at Fieldstone Golf Club for dinner. | |
| Alabama | Selma | March 5 | Arriving via Maxwell Air Force Base and flying to Craig Air Field Landing Zone on Marine One, President Biden delivered remarks to commemorate the 58th anniversary of Bloody Sunday. He then participated in the annual Selma Bridge Crossing at the Edmund Pettus Bridge. | |
| Pennsylvania | Philadelphia | March 9 | Arriving via Philadelphia International Airport and flying to Northeast Philadelphia Airport on Marine One, President Biden released his Budget for Fiscal Year 2024 and delivered remarks on continue to lower costs for families, protect and strengthen Social Security and Medicare at the Finishing Trades Institute. | |
| Delaware | Wilmington, Greenville | March 10–12 | Arriving via Wilmington-New Castle Airport, President Biden visited his Delaware home for the weekend. On Saturday, he attended Mass at St. Joseph on the Brandywine in Greenville. | |
| California | San Diego, Rancho Santa Fe, Monterey Park | March 13–14 | Arriving via Naval Air Station North Island, President Biden met with British prime minister Rishi Sunak and Australian prime minister Anthony Albanese. He delivered remarks on the Australia, the United Kingdom and the United States (AUKUS) Partnership at Naval Base Point Loma. Then flying from San Diego International Airport to Del Mar Country Club on Marine One, he then participated in a reception for the Democratic National Committee in Rancho Santa Fe. On March 14, arriving via Los Angeles International Airport and flying to San Gabriel Valley Airport on Marine One, President Biden discussed his efforts to reduce gun violence following the mass shooting in January 2023 at the Boys & Girls Club of West San Gabriel Valley. | |
| Nevada | Las Vegas | March 14–15 | Arriving via Harry Reid International Airport, President Biden participated in a reception for the Democratic National Committee. On March 15, President Biden discussed his plan to lower prescription drug costs at the William F. Harrah College of Hospitality on the campus of the University of Nevada, Las Vegas. | |
| Delaware | Wilmington, Greenville | March 17–19 | Arriving via Wilmington-New Castle Airport on Marine One, President Biden visited his Delaware home for the weekend. On Saturday, he attended Mass at St. Joseph on the Brandywine in Greenville. | |
| Canada | Ottawa | March 23–24 | Arriving via Ottawa International Airport, President Biden and First Lady Jill Biden met with Canadian Prime Minister Justin Trudeau with his wife Sophie Grégoire Trudeau and Canadian Governor General Mary Simon with her husband Whit Fraser. On March 24, President Biden addressed the Canadian Parliament at Parliament Hill and, together with Trudeau, announced tougher immigration policies for people traveling through the Canada-U.S. border. | |
| Delaware | Wilmington, Greenville | March 24–26 | Arriving via Wilmington-New Castle Airport, President Biden and First Lady Jill Biden visited their Delaware home for the weekend. On Saturday, he attended Mass at St. Joseph on the Brandywine in Greenville. | |
| North Carolina | Durham | March 28 | Arriving via Raleigh–Durham International Airport, President Biden toured and discussed on job growth, stronger infrastructure, and a Made in America manufacturing boom that is strengthening supply chains and national security at Wolfspeed. | |
| Mississippi | Rolling Fork | March 31 | Arriving via Jackson Air National Guard Base and flying to Yazoo County Airport on Marine One, President Biden and First Lady Jill Biden received an operational briefing by federal, local, and state officials on the impacts of Mississippi tornado at South Delta Elementary School. They met community leaders and local residents impacted by the storms. Then he delivered remarks to reaffirm his commitment to supporting the people of Mississippi as they recover and rebuild from the devastating storms. | |
| Delaware | Wilmington | March 31 | Arriving via Philadelphia International Airport and flying to Wilmington-New Castle Airport on Marine One, President Biden and First Lady Jill Biden visited their Delaware home for the weekend. | |

== April ==
| Country/ U.S. state | Areas visited | Dates | Details | Image |
|---|---|---|---|---|
| Pennsylvania | Philadelphia | April 1 | President Biden, First Lady Jill Biden, their son Hunter Biden, their daughter Ashley Biden and their granddaughters Finnegan and Maisy and their grandson Beau visited the University of Pennsylvania Charles Addams Fine Arts Hall where Maisy was part of a senior art show. They also stopped by for lunch at Parc Restaurant and Ashley's Wellness Center. | |
| Delaware | Wilmington | April 1–3 | President Biden and First Lady Jill Biden continued their weekend stay at their Delaware home. On Sunday, he attended Mass at St. Anthony of Padua Roman Catholic Church and visited at Fieldstone Golf Club for dinner. | |
| Minnesota | Fridley | April 3 | Arriving via Minneapolis-Saint Paul International Airport, President Biden toured and discussed on economic agenda, job growth, stronger supply chains and a Made in America manufacturing and clean energy boom at Cummins Power Generation Facility. | |
| United Kingdom | Belfast | April 11–12 | Arriving via Belfast International Airport, President Biden spent the night at Grand Central Hotel Belfast. On April 12, President Biden met with Prime Minister Rishi Sunak. He delivered remarks on the 25th anniversary of the Good Friday Agreement at Ulster University. | |
| Ireland | Dublin, Carlingford, Dundalk, Knock, Ballina | April 12–14 | Arriving via Dublin Airport, President Biden visited his ancestral homeland in County Louth, touring Carlingford Castle. He also visited Dundalk and participated in a community gathering. The president then returned to Dublin and spent the night at Conrad Hotel Dublin. On April 13, President Biden met with President Michael D. Higgins at Áras an Uachtaráin and An Taoiseach Leo Varadkar at Farmleigh House. He addressed both Houses of the Oireachtas at Leinster House before attending a state dinner at Dublin Castle. On April 14, arriving via Ireland West Airport, President Biden visited his ancestral homeland in County Mayo, touring The Sanctuary of Our Lady Knock and Mayo Roscommon Hospice. He visited the North Mayo Heritage and Genealogical Centre's Family History Research Unit and delivered a public address to the people of County Mayo at St Muredach's Cathedral. | |
| Delaware | Rehoboth Beach | April 15–16 | Arriving via Dover Air Force Base, President Biden visited his Delaware beach home for the weekend. Upon arrival, he attended Mass at St. Edmond Catholic Church. | |
| Maryland | Accokeek | April 19 | President Biden delivered remarks on the economy at the International Union of Operating Engineers Local 77. | |

== May ==
| Country/ U.S. state | Areas visited | Dates | Details | Image |
|---|---|---|---|---|
| New York | Valhalla, New York City | May 10 | Arriving via John F. Kennedy International Airport and flying to Westchester County Airport on Marine One, President Biden discussed on Debt ceiling at Westchester Community College. He then flew to Manhattan Harbor on Marine One and participated a campaign reception at the private residences of former Blackstone Inc. executive Hamilton E. James and executive chairman of Libra Group George Logothetis. | |
| Delaware | Rehoboth Beach | May 13–15 | Arriving via Dover Air Force Base, President Biden visited his Delaware beach home for the weekend. Upon arrival, he attended Mass at St. Edmond Catholic Church. On Sunday, he went on a bike ride at Cape Henlopen State Park. | |
| Pennsylvania | Philadelphia | May 15 | Arriving via Philadelphia International Airport, President Biden, First Lady Jill Biden, their son Hunter Biden and their daughter Ashley Biden attended the University of Pennsylvania's commencement of President Biden's granddaughter Maisy's graduation at Franklin Field. | |
| Alaska | Anchorage | May 17 | President Biden briefly stopped at Joint Base Elmendorf–Richardson as Air Force One was getting refueled, while on the way to his state visit in Japan. | |
| Japan | Hiroshima | May 18–21 | Arriving via Marine Corps Air Station Iwakuni and flying to Hiroshima Heliport Landing Zone on Marine One, President Biden held a bilateral meeting with Prime Minister Fumio Kishida at Rihga Royal Hotel Hiroshima. On May 19, President Biden attended the 49th G7 summit at Grand Prince Hotel Hiroshima. He visited the Hiroshima Peace Memorial Museum to participate in a wreath-laying ceremony and tree planting with G7 leaders and also visited Itsukushima Shrine. On May 20, President Biden attended the QUAD Leaders meeting with Prime Minister Kishida, Australian prime minister Anthony Albanese and Indian prime minister Narendra Modi. On May 21, President Biden held a bilateral meetings with South Korean president Yoon Suk Yeol and Ukrainian president Volodymyr Zelenskyy. | |
| Alaska | Anchorage | May 21 | President Biden briefly stopped at Joint Base Elmendorf–Richardson as Air Force One was getting refueled, while on his return trip from Japan. | |
| Delaware | Middletown | May 28 | Arriving via Summit Airport on Marine One, President Biden and First Lady Jill Biden attended the high school graduation of their granddaughter Natalie of the late Beau Biden at St. Andrew's School. | |
| Virginia | Arlington | May 29 | President Biden and First Lady Jill Biden participated in a wreath-laying ceremony at the Tomb of the Unknown Soldier in Arlington National Cemetery on Memorial Day. They were joined by Vice President Kamala Harris, Second Gentleman Doug Emhoff, Secretary of Defense Lloyd Austin and Chairman of the Joint Chiefs of Staff Mark Milley. President Biden delivered the Memorial Day address at the Memorial Amphitheater. | |
| Delaware | Wilmington, Greenville, New Castle | May 29–30 | Arriving via Wilmington-New Castle Airport, President Biden and First Lady Jill Biden spent the remainder of Memorial Day weekend at their Delaware home. On Tuesday, they attended mass and visited the burial site of their late son Beau Biden at their home parish, St. Joseph on the Brandywine in Greenville on the eighth anniversary of his death. He then visited and paid his respects at Veterans Memorial Park. | |
| Colorado | Colorado Springs | May 31 | Arriving via Peterson Space Force Base, President Biden spent the night in Colorado Springs ahead of the United States Air Force Academy Graduation Ceremony. | |

== June ==
| Country/ U.S. state | Areas visited | Dates | Details | Image |
|---|---|---|---|---|
| Colorado | Colorado Springs | June 1 | President Biden delivered the Commencement Address at the United States Air Force Academy Graduation Ceremony at Falcon Stadium. | |
| Maryland | Prince George's County | June 4 | President Biden played a round of golf with his brother James Biden at the golf course at Joint Base Andrews. | |
| North Carolina | Rocky Mount, Fort Bragg | June 9 | Arriving via Seymour Johnson Air Force Base and flying to Rocky Mount-Wilson Regional Airport on Marine One, President Biden and First Lady Jill Biden discussed how career-connected learning and workforce training programs are preparing students for good-paying jobs in North Carolina at Nash Community College. They then flew to Pope Field on Marine One and met with service members and their families and delivered remarks at an event in support of Joining Forces at Hercules Fitness Center. | |
| Connecticut | West Hartford, Greenwich | June 16 | Arriving via Bradley International Airport, President Biden delivered remarks at the National Safer Communities Summit at the University of Hartford. He then flew to Westchester County Airport and participated in a campaign reception at the private residence of Stephen Mandel, founder and managing director of Lone Pine Capital. | |
| Pennsylvania | Philadelphia | June 17 | Arriving via Philadelphia International Airport, President Biden went on an aerial tour on Marine One and received briefing on emergency repair and reconstruction efforts of the I-95 highway collapse. He and First Lady Jill Biden attended a campaign rally with union workers at the Philadelphia Convention Center. | |
| Delaware | Rehoboth Beach | June 17–19 | Arriving via Dover Air Force Base, President Biden and First Lady Jill Biden visited their Delaware beach home for Juneteenth weekend. Upon arrival, he attended Mass at St. Edmond Catholic Church with his daughter Ashley and his granddaughter Natalie. | |
| California | Palo Alto, Los Gatos, Atherton, San Francisco, Kentfield | June 19–21 | Arriving via Moffett Federal Airfield, President Biden delivered remarks on climate change at Lucy Evans Baylands Nature Interpretive Center and Preserve. He participated in campaign receptions hosted by Reid Hoffman, co-founder and executive chairman of LinkedIn and Kevin Scott, Microsoft's Chief Technology Officer in Los Gatos and at the private residence of Steve Westly, founder of The Westly Group in Atherton. On June 20, President Biden discussed on Artificial Intelligence with technology leaders at the Fairmont San Francisco. He then participated in campaign receptions in Kentfield and San Francisco. | |
| Maryland | Chevy Chase | June 27 | President Biden participated two campaign receptions, the first event at the private residence of Susie and Michael Gelman, and the second event at the private residence of Stewart W. Bainum Jr., chairman of Choice Hotels. | |
| Illinois | Chicago | June 28 | Arriving via Chicago O'Hare International Airport, President Biden delivered remarks on the major economy at the Old Chicago Main Post Office. He then participated in campaign reception with Illinois Governor J. B. Pritzker at JW Marriott Chicago. | |
| New York | New York City | June 29 | Arriving via John F. Kennedy International Airport and flying to Manhattan Harbor on Marine One, President Biden joined live interview with Nicolle Wallace of MSNBC at 30 Rockefeller Plaza. He then participated two campaign receptions, the first event at the private residences of Mark Gallogly, co-founder of Centerbridge Partners and the second event hosted by Jonathan D. Gray, president and chief operating officer of Blackstone Group and Blair Effron, co-founder of Centerview Partners at The Pool. | |

== July ==
| Country/ U.S. state | Areas visited | Dates | Details | Image |
|---|---|---|---|---|
| South Carolina | West Columbia | July 6 | Arriving via Columbia Metropolitan Airport, President Biden toured and delivered remarks on Bidenomics including new partnership between Enphase Energy and Flex at Flex LTD. | |
| Delaware | Rehoboth Beach | July 7–9 | Arriving via Dover Air Force Base, President Biden visited his Delaware beach home for the weekend. On Saturday, he attended mass at St. Edmond Catholic Church and spent the day at the beach with First Lady Jill Biden and their granddaughter Finnegan. On Sunday, he flew on Marine One to Dover Air Force Base and then he traveled to England. | |
| United Kingdom | London, Windsor | July 9–10 | Arriving via London Stansted Airport and flying to Winfield House on Marine One, President Biden spent the night at Winfield House. On July 10, President Biden met with Prime Minister Rishi Sunak at 10 Downing Street and King Charles III at Windsor Castle. | |
| Lithuania | Vilnius | July 10–12 | Arriving via Vilnius International Airport, President Biden spent the night at the Grand Hotel Kempinski Vilnius. On July 11, President Biden held a bilateral meeting with President Gitanas Nausėda at the Presidential Palace. He also attended the 33rd NATO summit and held a bilateral meeting with Turkish president Recep Tayyip Erdoğan at LITEXPO. On July 12, President Biden held a bilateral meeting with Ukrainian president Volodymyr Zelenskyy. He delivered remarks on supporting the United States and Ukraine at Vilnius University. | |
| Finland | Helsinki | July 12–13 | Arriving via Helsinki-Vantaa International Airport, President Biden spent the night at Radisson Blu Royal Hotel. On July 13, President Biden attended the U.S.–Nordic Summit and held a bilateral meeting with President Sauli Niinistö at the Presidential Palace. | |
| Pennsylvania | Philadelphia | July 20 | Arriving via Philadelphia International Airport, President Biden toured and delivered remarks on Bidenomics at Philly Shipyard. | |
| Maine | Auburn, Freeport | July 28 | Arriving via Brunswick Executive Airport and flying to Auburn/Lewiston Municipal Airport on Marine One, President Biden delivered remarks on Bidenomics at Auburn Manufacturing. He then participated in a campaign reception in Freeport. | |
| Delaware | Rehoboth Beach | July 28–31 | Arriving via Dover Air Force Base, President Biden visited his Delaware beach home for summer vacation. On Saturday, he attended mass at St. Edmond Catholic Church with his grandson Hunter. On Sunday, he spent the day at the beach with First Lady Jill Biden. On Monday, they both went on a bike ride at Cape Henlopen State Park. | |

== August ==
| Country/ U.S. state | Areas visited | Dates | Details | Image |
|---|---|---|---|---|
| Delaware | Rehoboth Beach, Lewes, Wilmington, Greenville | August 1–7 | President Biden and First Lady Jill Biden continued their summer vacation at their Delaware beach home. On Friday, he and First Lady Jill Biden flew from Cape Henlopen State Park to Wilmington-New Castle Airport on Marine One and spent time at their Delaware home. On Saturday, President Biden attended Mass at St. Joseph on the Brandywine in Greenville. On Sunday, President Biden played a round of golf with Jack Owens and Ron Olivere, and then he and First Lady Jill Biden had dinner with Valerie Biden Owens at the Fieldstone Golf Club. | |
| Arizona | Grand Canyon Village | August 7–8 | Arriving via Grand Canyon National Park Airport, President Biden spent the night in Grand Canyon Village. On August 8, President Biden delivered remarks on how the Inflation Reduction Act in Climate change at Red Butte Airfield. He visited at Grand Canyon National Park for a lookout of the Grand Canyon. | |
| New Mexico | Albuquerque, Belen | August 8–9 | Arriving via Kirtland Air Force Base, President Biden participated in a campaign reception in Albuquerque. On August 9, President Biden delivered remarks on Bidenomics, clean energy and manufacturing boom, one year after the Inflation Reduction Act and the CHIPS Act signed into law at Arcosa Wind Towers. | |
| Utah | Salt Lake City, Park City | August 9–10 | Arriving via Salt Lake City International Airport, President Biden spent the night in Salt Lake City. On August 10, President Biden delivered remarks on the first anniversary of the PACT Act at the George E. Wahlen VA Medical Center. He participated in a campaign reception in Park City. | |
| Delaware | Rehoboth Beach | August 11–14 | Arriving via Cape Henlopen State Park on Marine One, President Biden visited his Delaware beach home for the weekend. On Saturday, President Biden attended Mass at St. Edmond Catholic Church. On Sunday, President Biden went on a bike ride at Cape Henlopen State Park and he also spent the day at the beach with First Lady Jill Biden. | |
| Wisconsin | Milwaukee | August 15 | Arriving via Milwaukee Mitchell International Airport, President Biden delivered remarks on Bidenomics, ahead of the first anniversary of the Inflation Reduction Act at Ingeteam Inc. | |
| Pennsylvania | Scranton | August 17 | Arriving via Wilkes-Barre/Scranton International Airport, President Biden attended a viewing to paid his respects to former Pennsylvania first lady Ellen Casey at St. Peter's Cathedral. He then traveled to Camp David via Hagerstown Regional Airport. | |
| Nevada | Lake Tahoe | August 18–21 | Arriving via Reno–Tahoe International Airport, President Biden, First Lady Jill Biden, and other family members traveled to Lake Tahoe for summer vacation, staying at the home of Tom Steyer. On Saturday, President Biden attended mass at Our Lady of Tahoe Catholic Church. | |
| Hawaii | Lahaina | August 21 | Arriving via Kahului Airport and flying to Kapalua Airport on Marine One, President Biden and First Lady Jill Biden visited and surveyed the damages from Maui wildfire. They participate in a blessing ceremony with Lahaina elders at Mokuʻula. They also met with first responders, families and community members impacted by the wildfire and attended a community event at the Lahaina Civic Center. | |
| Nevada | Lake Tahoe | August 22–26 | Arriving via Reno–Tahoe International Airport, President Biden and First Lady Jill Biden returned to Lake Tahoe for the remainder of their summer vacation. | |
| California | South Lake Tahoe | August 23 and 25 | President Biden went shopping and exercised at a local gym with members of his family. | |

== September ==
| Country/ U.S. state | Areas visited | Dates | Details | Image |
|---|---|---|---|---|
| Florida | Live Oak | September 2 | Arriving via Gainesville Regional Airport and flying to Suwannee County Airport on Marine One, President Biden and First Lady Jill Biden visited and surveyed the damages from Hurricane Idalia. They also met with first responders, families and community members impacted by the hurricane at Suwannee Pineview Elementary. They were joined by Senator Rick Scott. | |
| Delaware | Rehoboth Beach | September 2–4 | Arriving via Dover Air Force Base and flying to Cape Henlopen State Park on Marine One, President Biden and First Lady Jill Biden visited their Delaware beach home for Labor Day weekend. On Sunday, President Biden attended mass at St. Edmond Catholic Church. | |
| Pennsylvania | Philadelphia | September 4 | Arriving via Philadelphia International Airport, President Biden delivered remarks on celebrating Labor Day and honoring the America's workers and unions at the Annual Tri-State Labor Day Parade at the Sheet Metal Workers' Local 19. | |
| Delaware | Wilmington | September 4 | Arriving via Wilmington-New Castle Airport, President Biden visited in Wilmington to spend the remainder of Labor Day at his Delaware home. | |
| Germany | Rhineland-Palatinate | September 8 | President Biden briefly stopped at Ramstein Air Base as Air Force One was being refueled, while on the way to his visit in India and Vietnam. | |
| India | New Delhi | September 8–10 | Arriving via Indira Gandhi International Airport, President Biden held a bilateral meeting with Prime Minister Narendra Modi at 7, Race Course Road. He then spent the night at the ITC Maurya. On September 9, President Biden attended the G20 summit at Bharat Mandapam International Exhibition-Convention Centre. On September 10, President Biden visited at Raj Ghat Memorial with G20 leaders to paid respect to Mahatma Gandhi. | |
| Vietnam | Hanoi | September 10–11 | Arriving via Noi Bai International Airport, President Biden met with Communist Party General Secretary Nguyễn Phú Trọng at the Presidential Palace for welcome ceremony and they also participated in a meeting at the Communist Party of Vietnam Headquarters to sign a strategic partnership agreement. He spent the night at JW Marriott Hotel Hanoi. On September 11, President Biden met with Prime Minister Phạm Minh Chính at the Office of the Government, President Võ Văn Thưởng at the Presidential Palace and Chairman of the National Assembly Vương Đình Huệ at the National Assembly. He visited the John McCain Memorial. | |
| Alaska | Anchorage | September 11 | President Biden delivered remarks to service members, first responders, and their families to commemorate the twenty-second anniversary of the September 11 attacks at Joint Base Elmendorf–Richardson. | |
| Virginia | McLean | September 13 | President Biden participated in a campaign fundraising reception with Virginia senators Mark Warner and Tim Kaine, former Virginia governor Terry McAuliffe and Richmond mayor Levar Stoney at the private residence of David Frederick and Sophie Lynn. | |
| Maryland | Largo | September 14 | President Biden delivered remarks on Bidenomics at Prince George's Community College. | |
| Delaware | Wilmington, Greenville | September 15–17 | Arriving via Wilmington-New Castle Airport on Marine One, President Biden visited his Delaware home for the weekend. On Saturday, President Biden attended Mass at St. Joseph on the Brandywine in Greenville. | |
| New York | New York City | September 17–20 | Arriving via John F. Kennedy International Airport and flying to Manhattan Harbor on Marine One, President Biden stopped at Il Cantinori had dinner to celebrated his granddaughter Finnegan's birthday. He spent the night at the InterContinental New York Barclay Hotel. On September 18, President Biden participated two campaign receptions, the first event hosted by the Black Economic Alliance at the St. Regis New York, and the second event held a "Broadway for Biden" at the Lunt-Fontanne Theatre. On September 19, President Biden addressed at the United Nations General Assembly at the Headquarters of the United Nations. He met with United Nations General Assembly President Dennis Francis and United Nations Secretary-General António Guterres. He hosted the C5+1 meeting at the United States Mission to the United Nations. He also hosted with First LadyJill Biden the Leader's Reception at the Metropolitan Museum of Art. On September 20, President Biden held a bilateral meetings with Israeli prime minister Benjamin Netanyahu and Brazilian president Lula da Silva. He participated two campaign receptions, the first event at the private residence of Amy Goldman Fowler, and the second event held a "Lawyers for Biden" with Second Gentleman Doug Emhoff at the InterContinental New York. | |
| Michigan | Belleville | September 26 | Arriving via Detroit Metropolitan Wayne County Airport, President Biden joined the picket line of the United Auto Workers strike at the General Motors' Willow Run Redistribution Center, UAW Local 174. | |
| California | Atherton, San Francisco | September 26–27 | Arriving via Moffett Federal Field, President Biden participated in a campaign reception hosted by Mark Heising and Liz Simons in Atherton. He then spent the night at the Fairmont San Francisco. On September 27, President Biden held a meeting with the President's Council of Advisors on Science and Technology (PCAST). He then participate two campaign receptions, the first event hosted by Tom Steyer and Kat Taylor and the second event hosted by Andrew McCollum, co-founder of Facebook with his wife Gretchen Sisson at the Century Club of California. | |
| Arizona | Phoenix, Tempe | September 27–28 | Arriving via Phoenix Sky Harbor International Airport, President Biden spent the night at Renaissance Phoenix Downtown Hotel. On September 28, President Biden delivered remarks honoring the legacy of the late Senator John McCain at the Tempe Center for the Arts. He then participate in a campaign reception hosted by Phoenix Mayor Kate Gallego at the private residence of Roberta and Jim Pederson. | |
| Virginia | Arlington | September 29 | President Biden delivered remarks at the Armed Forces Farewell Tribute to General Mark Milley and participated in an Armed Forces Hail to Chairman of the Joint Chiefs of Staff Charles Q. Brown at Joint Base Myer–Henderson Hall. He was joined by Vice President Kamala Harris and Second Gentlemen Doug Emhoff. | |

== October ==
| Country/ U.S. state | Areas visited | Dates | Details | Image |
|---|---|---|---|---|
| Pennsylvania | Philadelphia | October 13 | Arriving via Philadelphia International Airport, President Biden toured and discussed on Bidenomics at the Tioga Marine Terminal. | |
| Delaware | Wilmington | October 13 | Arriving via Wilmington-New Castle Airport on Marine One, President Biden visited his Delaware home briefly, before returning to Washington. | |
| Israel | Tel Aviv | October 18 | Arriving via Ben Gurion Airport, President Biden met with Prime Minister Benjamin Netanyahu to support Israel in the Gaza war and also met with first responders and families impacted by terror war at the Kempinski Hotel. | |
| Delaware | Rehoboth Beach | October 20–23 | Arriving via Dover Air Force Base and flying to Cape Henlopen State Park on Marine One, President Biden and First Lady Jill Biden visited their Delaware beach home for the weekend. On Saturday, President Biden attended mass at St. Edmond Catholic Church. On Sunday, President Biden stopped at Egg Restaurant for breakfast then he and First Lady Jill Biden spent the day at the beach. | |
| Delaware | Wilmington, Greenville | October 27–30 | Flying from Fort Lesley J. McNair to Wilmington-New Castle Airport on Marine One, President Biden visited his Delaware home for the weekend. On Saturday, President Biden attended Mass at St. Joseph on the Brandywine in Greenville. | |

== November ==
| Country/ U.S. state | Areas visited | Dates | Details | Image |
|---|---|---|---|---|
| Minnesota | Northfield, Minneapolis | November 1 | Arriving via Minneapolis–Saint Paul International Airport and flying to Northfield Landing Zone on Marine One, President Biden toured and delivered remarks on Bidenomics and his Investing in America agenda at Dutch Creek Farms. He was joined by Agriculture Secretary Tom Vilsack. He then participated in a campaign reception at Minneapolis Event Centers. | |
| Maine | Lewiston | November 3 | Arriving via Brunswick Executive Airport and flying to Auburn/Lewiston Municipal Airport on Marine One, President Biden and First Lady Jill Biden traveled to Lewiston following the mass shooting which occurred on October 25 and claimed the lives of eighteen people at Just-In-Time Recreation and Schemengees Bar & Grille Restaurant. They met first responders, nurses and families of victims and delivered remarks to pay respects to the victims of this horrific attack. They met privately with families of the victims at Raymond A. Geiger Elementary School. | |
| Delaware | Rehoboth Beach, Bear | November 3–6 | Arriving via Dover Air Force Base and flying to Cape Henlopen State Park on Marine One, President Biden and First Lady Jill Biden visited their Delaware beach home for the weekend. On Saturday, President Biden attended mass at St. Edmond Catholic Church. On Monday, flying from Cape Henlopen State Park to Wilmington-New Castle Airport on Marine One, President Biden greeted with Amtrak workers and delivered remarks on Bidenomics and his Investing in America agenda since the creation of Amtrak at the Amtrak Maintenance Facility. | |
| Illinois | Belvidere, Chicago | November 9 | Arriving via Chicago Rockford International Airport, President Biden delivered remarks and met with UAW autoworkers and UAW President Shawn Fain discussed the UAW's historic agreement and the reopening of a local assembly plant at Community Building Complex of Boone County. He then flew from O'Hare International Airport to Midway International Airport on Marine One and participated in a campaign reception at Ignite Glass Studios. | |
| Virginia | Arlington | November 11 | President Biden and First Lady Jill Biden participated Presidential Armed Forces Full Honor wreath-laying ceremony at the Tomb of the Unknown Soldier in Arlington National Cemetery on Veterans Day and he delivered the Veterans Day address at the Memorial Amphitheater. | |
| Delaware | Wilmington, Greenville | November 11–13 | Arriving via Wilmington-New Castle Airport on Marine One, President Biden and First Lady Jill Biden visited their Delaware home for Veterans Day weekend. Upon arrival, he attended Mass at St. Joseph on the Brandywine in Greenville. | |
| California | San Francisco, Redwood City, Woodside | November 14–17 | Arriving via San Francisco International Airport, President Biden participated in a campaign reception at the Merchants Exchange Building. He was joined by Vice President Kamala Harris and California governor Gavin Newsom. He then spent the night at the Fairmont San Francisco. On November 15, President Biden held bilateral meeting with Chinese president Xi Jinping at Filoli. He and First Lady Jill Biden hosted an APEC Leaders welcome reception at the Exploratorium. On November 16, President Biden hosted members of the Asia-Pacific Economic Cooperation for the APEC summit meeting and held trilateral meetings with Japanese prime minister Fumio Kishida and South Korean president Yoon Suk Yeol at the Moscone Center. On November 17, President Biden held bilateral meeting with Mexican president Andrés Manuel López Obrador. | |
| Delaware | Wilmington, Greenville | November 17–19 | Arriving via Philadelphia International Airport and flying to Wilmington-New Castle Airport on Marine One, President Biden visited his Delaware home for the weekend. On Saturday, President Biden visited at Fieldstone Golf Club for lunch, stopped by at Jos. A. Bank outlet in Greenville. He also attended mass at St. Joseph on the Brandywine. | |
| Virginia | Norfolk | November 19 | Arriving via Norfolk Naval Station, President Biden and First Lady Jill Biden attended an advance screening of Wonka for military service members and their families at Naval Support Activity Hampton Roads. They also participated in Thanksgiving Dinner with service members and military families from the USS Dwight D. Eisenhower and the USS Gerald R. Ford as part of the Joining Forces initiative, co-hosted by the USO and Robert Irvine Foundation at Norfolk Naval Station. | |
| Massachusetts | Nantucket | November 21–26 | Arriving via Nantucket Memorial Airport, President Biden, First Lady Jill Biden and other family members traveled to Nantucket for the Thanksgiving Holiday and they stayed at David Rubenstein's home. On November 23, President Biden and First Lady Jill Biden visited at Nantucket Fire Department. On November 24, President Biden delivered remarks on the release of hostages from Gaza at White Elephant Hotel, then he, First Lady Jill Biden and other family members attended Christmas tree lighting ceremony. On November 25, they attended Mass at St. Mary, Our Lady of the Isle Catholic Church. | |
| Georgia | Atlanta | November 28 | Arriving via Dobbins Air Reserve Base, President Biden and First Lady Jill Biden attended a tribute service for former first lady Rosalynn Carter at Glenn Memorial Church on the campus of Emory University. They were joined by Vice President Kamala Harris, Second Gentlemen Doug Emhoff, former presidents Jimmy Carter and Bill Clinton and former first ladies Hillary Clinton, Laura Bush, Michelle Obama and Melania Trump. | |
| Colorado | Denver, Pueblo | November 28–29 | Arriving via Denver International Airport, President Biden participated in a campaign reception at the private residence of Tamara Totah. On November 29, arriving via Pueblo Memorial Airport, President Biden toured and delivered remarks on Bidenomics at CS Wind Factory. | |

== December ==
| Country/ U.S. state | Areas visited | Dates | Details | Image |
|---|---|---|---|---|
| Massachusetts | Boston, Weston | December 5 | Arriving via Boston Logan International Airport, President Biden participated in three campaign receptions, the first event at the Westin Boston Seaport, the second event at the private residence of Alan Solomont, former U.S. Ambassador to Spain and Andorra in Weston and the third event held a "You've Got a Friend in Joe" with James Taylor at Shubert Theatre. | |
| Nevada | Las Vegas | December 8 | Arriving via Harry Reid International Airport, President Biden delivered remarks on how his Investing in America Agenda is advancing his vision for world-class infrastructure across the country at Carpenter International Training Center. | |
| California | Los Angeles, Beverly Hills, Brentwood, Pacific Palisades | December 8–10 | Arriving via Los Angeles International Airport to Santa Monica Airport on Marine One, President Biden and First Lady Jill Biden participated in a campaign reception at the private residence of Michael Smith and James Costos. On December 9, President Biden participated two campaign meetings in Beverly Hills and Brentwood. He attended a shiva in honor the passing of Norman Lear at the private residence of Lyn Lear. He then also participated in a campaign reception in Pacific Palisades. | |
| Pennsylvania | Philadelphia | December 11 | Arriving via Philadelphia International Airport, President Biden delivered remarks at the event that fund firefighters salary and benefits and enable the Philadelphia Fire Department to reopen three fire companies at Engine 13 Firehouse. He participated in a campaign reception at Hilton Philadelphia at Penn's Landing. | |
| Maryland | Bethesda | December 14 | President Biden delivered remarks on lower prescription drug costs at the National Institutes of Health. | |
| Delaware | Wilmington, Greenville | December 17–19 | Arriving via Wilmington-New Castle Airport, President Biden and First Lady Jill Biden visited their Delaware home for the remainder of weekend. Upon arrival, they visited the campaign headquarters in Wilmington. On Monday, they attended Mass and visited the burial site of his first wife Neilia Hunter Biden and first daughter Naomi at St. Joseph on the Brandywine in Greenville on their 51st anniversary of their death. | |
| Maryland | Bethesda | December 19 | President Biden attended a campaign reception in Bethesda. | |
| Wisconsin | Milwaukee | December 20 | Arriving via Milwaukee Mitchell International Airport, President Biden visited Hero Plumbing then he discussed small business growth and Bidenomics at the Wisconsin Black Chamber of Commerce. | |
| U.S. Virgin Islands | St. Croix | December 27–31 | Arriving via Henry E. Rohlsen Airport, President Biden, First Lady Jill Biden and other family members traveled to St. Croix for New Year's Holiday and they stayed at the private residence of Bill and Connie Neville. On Saturday, they attended Mass at Holy Cross Catholic Church, also they taped their appearance on ABC's Dick Clark's New Year's Rockin' Eve with Ryan Seacrest and also they stopped at Too.Chez Restaurant and Bar for dinner. | |

== See also ==
- List of international presidential trips made by Joe Biden
- Lists of presidential trips made by Joe Biden
