= William F. Harrah College of Hospitality =

Collage in Nevada, US

Coordinates: 36.10618°N 115.14134°W

The William F. Harrah College of Hospitality (formerly known as the William F. Harrah College of Hotel Administration) offers graduate and undergraduate degrees in hospitality management at the University of Nevada, Las Vegas (UNLV). The school is named after William F. Harrah, the founder of Harrah's Entertainment.

Located 1.5 miles from the Las Vegas Strip. Of UNLV’s nearly 30,000 students, an average of 2,500 students are enrolled in the Harrah Hotel College, 22% of which are international students. Of the college’s 15,000 alumni, 50% reside outside of Las Vegas. Notable alumni include Guy Fieri, William Hornbuckle, Booze Davis, Randall Cunningham, and George Maloof.

Since 1974, the college has been involved in a world-known annual wine and food event known as UNLVino, which serves to generate scholarships for students of the college. With the support of long-time co-sponsor Southern Glazer’s Wine and Spirits, UNLVino has branched out into three separate concept events, attracting thousands of attendees.

== History ==
UNLV's hotel management program began in 1967, when the school was called Nevada Southern University. At the time, the program only had two full time employees and relied heavily on part-time workers from the Strip, a practice that continued for years as the college grew. In 1969, founding dean Jerry Vallen established the newly-renamed College of Hotel Administration as a stand-alone program. In 1989 the college was officially named for William F. Harrah, in recognition of a $5 million gift from his widow.

In 2007, the college received a $2.5 million gift from Caesar's Entertainment, which in 2005 had been acquired by Harrah’s Entertainment, toward the construction of a hospitality-focused academic building on the UNLV campus. Fundraising for the building subsequently stalled due to a nationwide economic downturn.

In 2013-14, the College of Hospitality revived the long-delayed project and began fundraising for a 93,500 square feet academic facility with some 10 classroom spaces, a café, meeting and event space, and a 2,800 square-foot learning kitchen. Joining Caesar’s as Hospitality Hall “Founders” were Las Vegas Sands, Konami Gaming, MGM Resorts International, Boyd Gaming Corporation, Stations Casinos, J. Willard and Alice S. Marriott Foundation, and the Engelstad Family Foundation. Founders’ gifts, along with additional industry partner donations, have helped the Harrah College of Hospitality move closer to its private funding goal. Matching funds by the State of Nevada also helped construction move forward. The building opened in January 2018.

== Degree programs ==
- B.S. in Hospitality Management
- M.H.A. or Master of Hospitality Administration
- M.S. in Hotel Administration
- Dual MBA/MS in Hotel Administration/Business Administration
- Ph.D. in Hospitality Administration
