= Timeline of the Joe Biden presidency (2022 Q3) =

The following is a timeline of the presidency of Joe Biden during the third quarter of 2022, from July 1 to September 30, 2022. For a complete itinerary of his travels, see List of presidential trips made by Joe Biden (2022). To navigate between quarters, see timeline of the Joe Biden presidency. For the Q4 timeline see timeline of the Joe Biden presidency (2022 Q4).

== Timeline ==
=== July 2022 ===
Date	Events	Photos/videos
Friday, July 1	President Biden announces 17 Presidential Medal of Freedom recipients.	
Saturday, July 2		
Sunday, July 3		
Monday, July 4	President Biden said that Illinois Governor J. B. Pritzker and Highland Park Mayor Nancy Rotering offered full support for the federal government to investigate the perpetrator of the Highland Park parade shooting. He also remarked about gun control legislation.; President Biden and his family celebrates Independence Day.	
Tuesday, July 5	President Biden awards the Medal of Honor to four Vietnam War veterans. Dwight Birdwell (who fought an ambush in 1968 at the Tan Son Nhut Air Base), Major John J. Duffy (who was wounded at the Easter Offensive), Dennis Fujii, and a posthumous medal to Sargent Edward Kaneshiro, who died from an enemy gunshot. Kaneshiro's son accepted the award.	President Biden awards Mr. Duffy with the Medal of Honor
Wednesday, July 6		
Thursday, July 7	President Biden awards 17 people, including Gabby Giffords, Simone Biles, and John McCain, the Presidential Medal of Freedom.	President Biden hosting the Presidential Medal of Freedom ceremony
Friday, July 8	President Biden pays condolences to former Japanese Prime Minister Shinzo Abe after he was assassinated.; President Biden signs an executive order that restores access to abortion but does not limit trigger laws.	President Biden at the Japanese Embassy to pay condolences to Shinzo Abe President Biden delivers remarks about abortion rights and signs an executive order to partially restore abortion access
Saturday, July 9		
Sunday, July 10		
Monday, July 11	First Lady Jill Biden addresses the Latino non-profit advocacy group UnidosUS in San Antonio, Texas.	
Tuesday, July 12	President Biden holds a bilateral meeting with Mexican President Andrés Manuel López Obrador at the White House.; First Lady Jill Biden is criticized by multiple Latino advocacy groups, including the National Association of Hispanic Journalists, for her remark about comparing the Latino community to the tacos in San Antonio. A White House spokesperson said she apologized.	President Biden and Mexican president Andrés Manuel López Obrador
Wednesday, July 13	President Biden arrives in Israel to restore relations with Arab nations and to talk about oil.; President Biden talks to opposition leader Benjamin Netanyahu about relations with Iran.; President Biden lays down a wreath at Yad Vashem in Jerusalem.	Israeli President Isaac Herzog and Prime Minister Yair Lapid welcomes President Biden President Biden lays down a wreath at Yad Vashem in honor of those who lost their lives in the Holocaust
Thursday, July 14	President Biden is awarded the Presidential Medal of Honor by Israel.; President Biden and Prime Minister Yair Lapid signs a joint declaration between the U.S. and Israel.	President Biden receives the Presidential Medal of Honor from Israeli president Isaac Herzog President Biden and Israeli prime minister Yair Lapid
Friday, July 15	President Biden visits Saudi Arabia and fist bumps Crown Prince Mohammed bin Salman despite vowing to make him a "pariah".; Judge Charles E. Atchley Jr. temporarily bars LGBTQ+ protection laws in 20 states, claiming they infringe on state rights.	
Saturday, July 16	First Lady Jill Biden criticizes her own husband's tenure during a private DNC fundraiser in Nantucket, Massachusetts, saying that he puts the blame on foreign problems for his crises in office and that he had "so many hopes and plans". She also blamed congressional Republicans.	
Sunday, July 17	President Biden participates in the GCC+3 special summit in Jeddah.	President Biden and GCC+3 leaders
Monday, July 18		
Tuesday, July 19	President Biden signs an executive order into law that supports citizens and families that are wrongfully detained or held hostage overseas.; President Biden and First Lady Jill Biden meet with Ukrainian First Lady Olena Zelenska in the Blue Room.	From left to right: Second Gentleman Emhoff, Vice President Harris, First Ukrainian lady Zelenska, President Biden, First Lady Jill Biden
Wednesday, July 20	President Biden announces new executive steps to combat climate change, but did not declare it a national emergency.	
Thursday, July 21	President Biden tests positive for COVID-19 for the first time and enters isolation.; The Supreme Court decides that they will not block a lower court ruling that prevents the administration for setting new enforcements for immigration policies. They will take issue with the ruling in December. Notably, it was the first ruling that Ketanji Brown Jackson voted on.	President Biden announces his first positive COVID-19 test
Friday, July 22		
Saturday, July 23		
Sunday, July 24		
Monday, July 25		
Tuesday, July 26		
Wednesday, July 27	President Biden tests negative for COVID-19 for the first time, and he left isolation.	President Biden's negative COVID-19 test
Thursday, July 28	President Biden speaks with China's leader Xi Jinping and discuss Taiwan, a possible face to face meeting in the future, and other things.; Representative Dean Phillips of Minnesota becomes the first incumbent Democratic member of Congress to say President Biden should not run for re-election and called for "generational change" pointing to Biden's age.	
Friday, July 29		
Saturday, July 30	President Biden tests positive for COVID-19 for the second time and enters isolation.	President Biden announces his second positive COVID-19 test
Sunday, July 31		

=== August 2022 ===
Date	Events	Photos/videos
Monday, August 1	President Biden confirms that Al Qaeda leader Ayman al-Zawahiri has been killed.	President Biden announces the death of Al Qaeda leader Ayman al-Zawahiri
Tuesday, August 2		
Wednesday, August 3	The United States Department of Health and Human Services calls for a new White House office that focuses on the research of long COVID.	
Thursday, August 4		
Friday, August 5		
Saturday, August 6	President Biden tests negative for COVID-19 for the second time, and he left isolation.	
Sunday, August 7	The United States Senate passes the Inflation Reduction Act of 2022 with Vice President Kamala Harris casting the tiebreaking vote.	
Monday, August 8	President Biden travels to Kentucky to survey the flood damage and promises federal support.	President Biden surveys damage in Kentucky
Tuesday, August 9	President Biden signs the bipartisan CHIPS Act into law that boosts manufacturing competitiveness with China.; President Biden signs documents that approve Finland's and Sweden's accessions to NATO.	President Biden signs the CHIP Act President Biden signs the approval of Finland's and Sweden's accessions to NATO
Wednesday, August 10	President Biden signs the Honoring our PACT Act of 2022, which expands health benefits to military veterans exposed to toxic burn pits.	President Biden signs the PACT act
Thursday, August 11		
Friday, August 12		
Saturday, August 13		
Sunday, August 14		
Monday, August 15		
Tuesday, August 16	President Biden signs the Inflation Reduction Act into law.; First Lady Jill Biden tests positive for COVID-19.	President Biden signs the Inflation Reduction Act
Wednesday, August 17	President Biden called congresswoman Liz Cheney after her loss to Trump-backed candidate Harriet Hageman in the Republican primary in Wyoming. The White House spokesperson declined to comment on the call.	
Thursday, August 18		
Friday, August 19		
Saturday, August 20		
Sunday, August 21		
Monday, August 22		
Tuesday, August 23		
Wednesday, August 24		
Thursday, August 25	President Biden returns from his vacation in Delaware to deliver remarks at a political rally in Rockville, Maryland at Richard Montgomery High School.	
Friday, August 26	President Biden commemorates the 13 soldiers who died on the first anniversary of the 2021 Kabul airport attack.	
Saturday, August 27		
Sunday, August 28		
Monday, August 29		
Tuesday, August 30	President Biden condemns the National Rifle Association of America and Trump supporters in his Safer America Plan speech at Wilkes University.	President Biden delivers remarks on his safer America plan
Wednesday, August 31		

=== September 2022 ===
Date	Events	Photos/videos
Thursday, September 1	President Biden delivers a primetime speech outside of the Independence Hall in Philadelphia.	President Biden gives a speech on the battle for the soul of the nation
Friday, September 2		
Saturday, September 3		
Sunday, September 4		
Monday, September 5	President Biden travels to Milwaukee and Pittsburgh to give speeches on Labor Day.	President Biden at Milwaukee Laborfest
Tuesday, September 6		
Wednesday, September 7	President Biden and First Lady Jill Biden invite former President Barack Obama and former First Lady Michelle Obama back to the White House for the unveiling of the latter's official White House portraits.	President Biden and former president Obama with their spouses
Thursday, September 8	President Biden pays tribute to Elizabeth II after her death on this day saying she was "more than a monarch" and that she "defined an era". He ordered all flags on U.S. public buildings, including the White House, to be flown at half-staff until sundown on the day her body is laid to rest.	
Friday, September 9		
Saturday, September 10		
Sunday, September 11	President Biden and First Lady Jill Biden lay a wreath at the September 11 Memorial at the Pentagon commemorating the 21st anniversary of the September 11 attacks, and later pay tribute to the nearly three thousand Americans killed that day, pledging to continue to confront radical Islamic terrorism.	President Biden speaks at the Pentagon on 9/11
Monday, September 12		
Tuesday, September 13		
Wednesday, September 14	President Biden speaks with King Charles III.	
Thursday, September 15		
Friday, September 16	President Biden delivers remarks about the US economy.; President Biden holds a bilateral meeting with South African President Cyril Ramaphosa at the White House.	President Biden and South African president Cyril Ramaphosa
Saturday, September 17		
Sunday, September 18	President Biden arrives at Westminster Hall, England to pay respects to Queen Elizabeth II on the eve of her state funeral.	
Monday, September 19	President Biden attends the state funeral of Queen Elizabeth II in London, England.	
Tuesday, September 20		
Wednesday, September 21	President Biden delivers a speech at the General debate of the seventy-seventh session of the United Nations General Assembly.; President Biden meets with U.N. Secretary General António Guterres and British Prime Minister Liz Truss following his speech to the United Nations General Assembly.	President Biden addresses the United Nations General Assembly President Biden and British Prime Minister Liz Truss
Thursday, September 22	President Biden meets with Philippine President Bongbong Marcos.	President Biden and Philippine President Bongbong Marcos
Friday, September 23	President Biden awards Elton John the National Humanities Medal.	
Saturday, September 24		
Sunday, September 25	Vice President Harris begins her trip to Japan and South Korea.	
Monday, September 26	Vice President Harris meets with Japanese prime minister Fumio Kishida.	Vice President Harris and Japanese prime minister Fumio Kishida
Tuesday, September 27	Vice President Harris attends the state funeral of former Japanese prime minister Shinzo Abe in Tokyo, Japan.	
Wednesday, September 28	President Biden meets with Pacific Island leaders in the first ever U.S.-Pacific Island Country Summit.	President Biden with Pacific Island leaders.
Thursday, September 29	President Biden makes a disaster declaration for Hurricane Ian in Florida saying it could be "the deadliest hurricane in Florida's history" and orders federal assistance in response efforts.; President Biden suffered a blunder during a speech where he asked if deceased congresswoman Jackie Walorski was in the audience.; Vice President Harris visits the Korean Demilitarized Zone.	President Biden receives a briefing on Hurricane Ian at FEMA headquarters Vice President Harris at the Korean Demilitarized Zone
Friday, September 30	In response to Russian President Vladimir Putin's annexation of four Ukrainian regions, President Biden states that the United States will "never, never, never" recognise the four regions as Russian territories. He also announced further sanctions on Russia.	

== See also ==
- First 100 days of the Biden presidency – Period from January to April 2021
- List of executive actions by Joe Biden
- Lists of presidential trips made by Joe Biden (international trips)
- Presidential transition of Joe Biden – Transfer of presidential power from Donald Trump to Joe Biden
- Timeline of the 2020 United States presidential election

U.S. presidential administration timelines
Preceded by Biden presidency (2022 Q2)	Biden presidency (2022 Q3)	Succeeded by Biden presidency (2022 Q4)
