= Official White House portraits of Michelle and Barack Obama =

Paintings by Robert McCurdy and Sharon Sprung

Michelle Obama by Sharon Sprung

Barack Obama by Robert McCurdy

Official White House portraits, c. 2018

The official White House portraits of President Barack Obama and First Lady Michelle Obama were painted in 2021 and unveiled in 2022. The former president's portrait was painted by Robert McCurdy and the former first lady's by Sharon Sprung.

== Unveiling ==
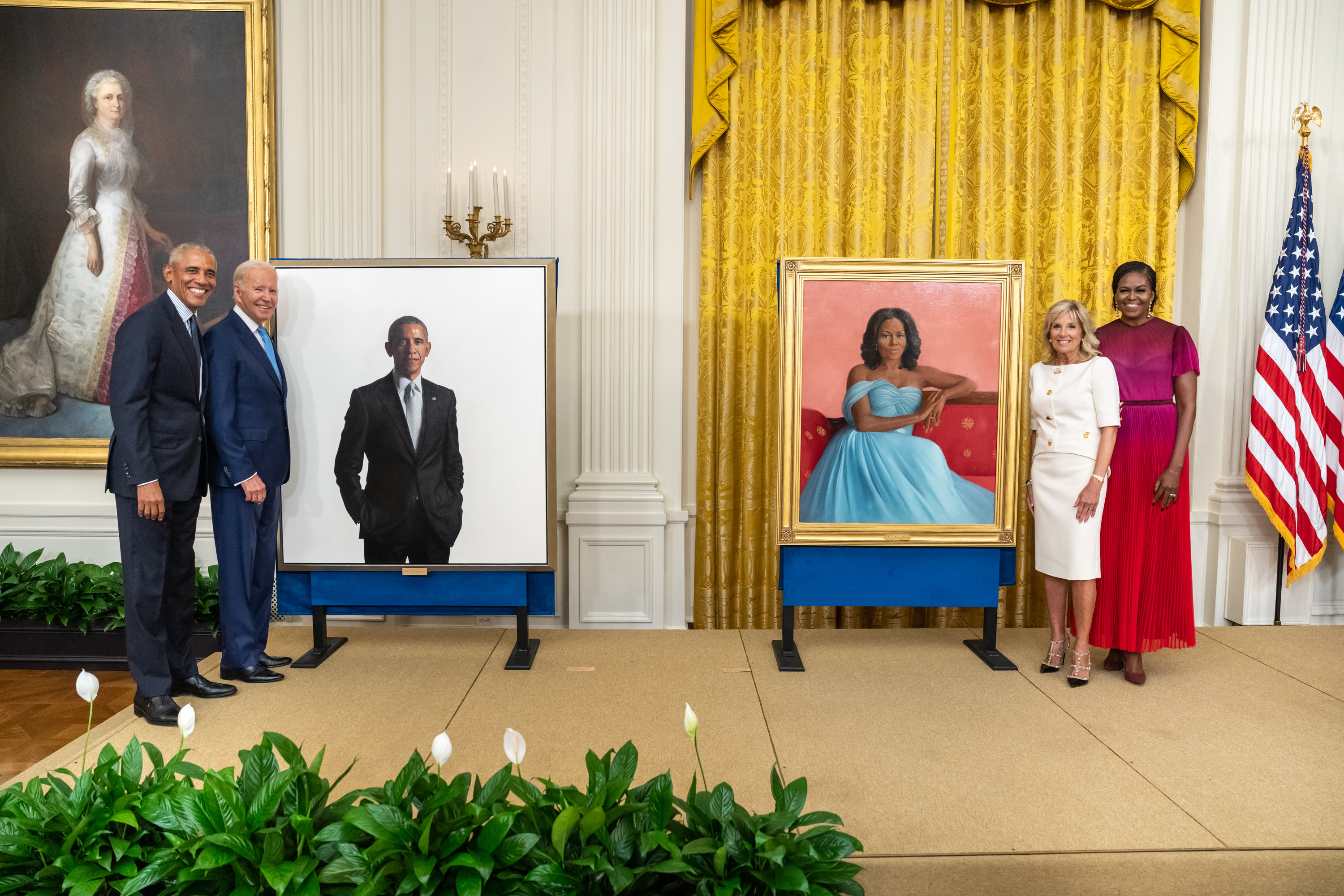
The Obamas at the unveiling of the portraits with President Joe Biden and Jill Biden in 2022

The paintings were commissioned by the White House Historical Association. The unveiling ceremony took place on September 7, 2022, in the East Room of the White House. Following a private lunch, President Joe Biden and First Lady Jill Biden hosted the ceremony. This was a break in tradition as unveiling ceremonies are hosted by each president's immediate successor, who in Obama's case was Donald Trump, but he did not schedule the ceremony during his first term. Per customs, the artists were selected by Michelle and Barack Obama before the latter's presidency came to an end. Following the unveiling ceremony, the portraits were hung at the White House where they remain part of the White House Collection. The former president stated: "When future generations walk these halls and look up at these portraits, I hope they get a better, honest sense of who Michelle and I were."

== Description ==
=== Portrait of Barack Obama ===
Barack Obama's portrait was painted by Robert McCurdy, who focused on working off of a photograph of the former president. In the photorealistic portrait, Obama is dressed in a black suit with a gray tie, and painted against a minimal white backdrop, a signature of McCurdy's artworks. McCurdy worked on the portrait for about a year.

=== Portrait of Michelle Obama ===
The official portrait for First Lady Michelle Obama was painted by realism artist Sharon Sprung. In First Lady Obama's oil painting portrait, she appears in an off-the-shoulder turquoise gown designed by Jason Wu against a warm pink wall, looking "intent but alluring and unmistakably herself." She is depicted seated on a red sofa against the backdrop of the Red Room. The portrait was painted from photographs taken in different locations on the White House's State Floor. The artist initially wanted to have Obama standing, but then decided to have her in a seated position to keep her at her own eye level. Work on the painting lasted for 9-18 months and Sprung faced minor challenges in White House protocol when she wanted to move things around in different rooms to improve the lighting or the scene.

According to Maegan Vazquez of CNN, the portrait shows Obama "appearing to take a brief moment to get comfortable inside one of the most formal rooms in the White House". Vazquez also noted that it was the first time such a portrait depicted someone in a strapless dress.

== Reception ==
At the event, the former president thanked Sprung for "capturing everything I love about Michelle, her grace, her intelligence -- and the fact that she's fine".

Dan Kois of Slate said Michelle Obama's portrait "pays tribute to the past while pulling presidential portraiture gently into the 21st century" and praised the gilded frame. He had a less favorable review on Barack Obama's portrait, stating "It looks like the Photoshopped jacket of a dull Obama biography" that "leaps straight from the staid 19th-century tradition to an unpleasantly contemporary, grimly corporate one". Will Heinrich of The New York Times compared Michelle Obama's portrait to those by other artists, noting the way Sprung's work "is a reminder that oil paint remains the best technology for really looking at someone" and presents a "compromise between the Obamas' desire to innovate and the imperative to respect the White House aesthetic".

== See also ==
- Art in the White House
- Portraits of presidents of the United States
