= Timeline of the Joe Biden presidency (2022 Q4) =

The following is a timeline of the presidency of Joe Biden during the fourth quarter of 2022, from October 1 to December 31, 2022. For a complete itinerary of his travels, see List of presidential trips made by Joe Biden (2022). To navigate between quarters, see timeline of the Joe Biden presidency.

== Timeline ==
=== October 2022 ===
Date	Events	Photos/videos
Saturday, October 1	President Biden calls United States Coast Guard diver Zach Loesch to congratulate him for rescuing Florida residents during Hurricane Ian just days before he was due to be dismissed over refusing to comply with Biden's COVID-19 vaccine mandate for US service personnel.	
Sunday, October 2	President Biden agrees to a prisoner swap with President of Venezuela Nicolás Maduro. President Biden agreed to release two of President Maduro's wife's nephews who had been held in the US on drug charges since 2015, in exchange for the release of seven American citizens held in Venezuela, including five American oil executives, a US Marine veteran and another US citizen.	
Monday, October 3	President Biden announces during a visit to Puerto Rico that his administration would allocate $60 million in funding to help coastal areas in the territory become more storm-resilient.; Vice President Kamala Harris is involved in a car accident in which the vehicle in which she was riding in her motorcade struck a curb, disabling its back wheel. She was promptly moved to another vehicle and sustained no injuries. Secret Service director Kim Cheatle was satisfied the incident was accidental and no disciplinary action was taken against the driver	President Biden delivers remarks at the Port of Ponce in Puerto Rico
Tuesday, October 4		
Wednesday, October 5	President Biden visits Florida to survey the damage caused by Hurricane Ian.	President Biden with Governor Ron DeSantis
Thursday, October 6		
Friday, October 7	Speaking at a Democratic fundraiser in New York, President Biden says: "For the first time since the Cuban missile crisis, we have a direct threat of the use of nuclear weapons", adding "I don't think there's any such thing as the ability to easily use a tactical nuclear weapon and not end up with Armageddon".	
Saturday, October 8		
Sunday, October 9		
Monday, October 10		
Tuesday, October 11	President Biden says that his administration would "re-evaluate" the U.S. relationship with Saudi Arabia after oil production cuts.	
Wednesday, October 12	President Biden dedicates Camp Hale, a World War II training site, as his administrations' first National Monument in Leadville, Colorado.; During the speech, President Biden mistakenly states that his late son, Beau, "lost his life in Iraq" (Beau survived his service in Iraq and died of brain cancer in the United States in May 2015).	President Biden establishes the Camp Hale-Continental Divide National Monument
Thursday, October 13		
Friday, October 14		
Saturday, October 15		
Sunday, October 16		
Monday, October 17		
Tuesday, October 18		
Wednesday, October 19		
Thursday, October 20	President Biden reacts to the resignation of British prime minister Liz Truss after just 45 days in office, making her the shortest-serving prime minister in British history, saying she "had been a good partner on the Russia and Ukraine, and that the British are going to solve their problems".	
Friday, October 21		
Saturday, October 22		
Sunday, October 23		
Monday, October 24		
Tuesday, October 25	President Biden receives his third COVID-19 booster shot.	President Biden receives a third COVID-19 booster shot
Wednesday, October 26	President Biden holds a bilateral meeting with Israeli President Isaac Herzog at the White House.	President Biden and Israeli President Isaac Herzog
Thursday, October 27		
Friday, October 28		
Saturday, October 29	President Biden votes early in the midterm legislative elections in the United States.	
Sunday, October 30		
Monday, October 31	President Biden and First Lady Jill Biden participate in the 2022 White House Halloween event.	President Biden and First Lady Jill Biden at the White House Halloween event

=== November 2022 ===
Date	Events	Photos/videos
Tuesday, November 1	President Biden campaigns with Florida gubernatorial candidate Charlie Crist and U.S. Senate candidate Val Demings in Miami Gardens ahead of the gubernatorial and senate elections.	
Wednesday, November 2		
Thursday, November 3		
Friday, November 4	President Biden campaigns with New Mexico governor Michelle Lujan Grisham in Albuquerque ahead of the gubernatorial election.	
Saturday, November 5	President Biden and former president Barack Obama campaign with Pennsylvania gubernatorial candidate Josh Shapiro and U.S. Senate candidate John Fetterman in Philadelphia ahead of the gubernatorial and Senate elections.	
Sunday, November 6	President Biden campaigns with New York governor Kathy Hochul in Yonkers ahead of the gubernatorial election.	
Monday, November 7	President Biden campaigns with Maryland gubernatorial candidate Wes Moore and Senator Chris Van Hollen in Bowie ahead of the gubernatorial and Senate elections.	
Tuesday, November 8	The midterm elections are held. The Democratic caucus maintained control of the Senate while Republicans gained control of the House of Representatives.	
Wednesday, November 9		
Thursday, November 10		
Friday, November 11	President Biden speaks at the 2022 United Nations Climate Change Conference in Sharm El Sheikh.; President Biden holds a bilateral meeting with Egyptian President Abdel Fattah el-Sisi.	President Biden and Egyptian President Abdel Fattah el-Sisi
Saturday, November 12	President Biden attends the East Asia summit in Phnom Penh.	President Biden at the East Asia Summit
Sunday, November 13	President Biden holds a trilateral meeting with Japanese Prime Minister Fumio Kishida and South Korea President Yoon Suk-yeol.; President Biden holds a bilateral meeting with Australian Prime Minister Anthony Albanese.	President Biden and Australian prime minister Anthony Albanese
Monday, November 14	President Biden holds a bilateral meeting with Chinese President and CCP General Secretary Xi Jinping.; President Biden holds a bilateral meeting with Indonesian President Joko Widodo.	President Biden and Chinese leader Xi Jinping
Tuesday, November 15	President Biden attends the G20 summit hosted by Indonesian President Joko Widodo.; Former President Donald Trump, who was defeated by President Biden in the 2020 election, officially announces his candidacy for president in the 2024 election, paving the way for the first potential rematch between two candidates since 1956.	President Biden participates in the G20 summit
Wednesday, November 16		
Thursday, November 17		
Friday, November 18		
Saturday, November 19		
Sunday, November 20	President Biden celebrates his 80th birthday. He is the first President to reach 80 years of age while still in office.	President Biden celebrates his 80th birthday
Monday, November 21	President Biden participates in the 2022 National Thanksgiving Turkey Presentation.; President Biden and First Lady Jill Biden travel to Havelock to celebrate a "Friendsgiving" with military personnel and families.; First Lady Jill Biden welcomes the arrival of the 2022 White House Christmas tree.	President Biden delivers remarks at the National Thanksgiving Turkey Presentation President Biden with military personnel and families
Tuesday, November 22		
Wednesday, November 23		
Thursday, November 24	President Biden celebrates his second Thanksgiving with his family's traditional trip in Nantucket, Massachusetts at the home of billionaire David Rubenstein while visiting local firefighters.	President Biden and First Lady Jill Biden
Friday, November 25		
Saturday, November 26		
Sunday, November 27		
Monday, November 28	First Lady Jill Biden unveils the Christmas decorations at the White House for the second time.	First Lady Jill Biden unveiling the 2022 Christmas decorations
Tuesday, November 29	French President Emmanuel Macron, accompanied by his wife Brigitte Macron, begins a four-day state visit to the US, the first during the Biden presidency.	
Wednesday, November 30	President Biden and First Lady Jill Biden attend the National Christmas Tree Lighting outside of the White House.	President Biden at the National Christmas Tree Lighting

=== December 2022 ===
Date	Events	Photos/videos
Thursday, December 1	President Biden holds a bilateral meeting and joint press conference with French President Emmanuel Macron at the White House.; President Biden and First Lady Jill Biden host their first state dinner in honor of French President Emmanuel Macron and his wife, Brigitte.	President Biden and French President Emmanuel Macron
Friday, December 2		
Saturday, December 3		
Sunday, December 4		
Monday, December 5		
Tuesday, December 6	Democrat incumbent Raphael Warnock is declared the winner of the 2022 Senate runoff election in Georgia, defeating Republican Herschel Walker. This gives the Senate a 51/49 split between the Democratic caucus and the Republican party. (Note: Kyrsten Sinema, whose seat was not up for election in 2022, left the Democratic Party and became an independent politician in December 2022, after the election but before the swearing in of the next Congress. As a result, 48 Democrats (rather than 49), plus Angus King and Bernie Sanders, independents who caucus with Democrats, were in the Senate upon commencement of the 118th United States Congress, on January 3, 2023. Sinema opted to caucus with neither party but continued to align with the Democrats, bringing the Democratic Senate majority to 51 seats.)	
Wednesday, December 7	President Biden signs the Speak Out Act, which protects victims of sexual harassment and misconduct.	
Thursday, December 8		
Friday, December 9		
Saturday, December 10		
Sunday, December 11		
Monday, December 12	Following the conclusion to the mandatory recount in Colorado District 3 the midterm elections results are now fully completed with all races called. The final tallies was 48/49 in the Senate with 3 Independents aligning with the Democrats bringing their working total to 51 seats. 213/222 in the House of Representatives with Republicans leading and 24/26 Governors with Republicans leading.; President Biden and First Lady Jill Biden host a Toys for Tots event.	
Tuesday, December 13	President Biden signs the Respect for Marriage Act into law, which protects same-sex and interracial marriages.	President Biden signs the Respect for Marriage Act
Wednesday, December 14	President Biden speaks at the U.S.–Africa Business Forum.	President Biden speaks at the U.S.–Africa Business Forum
Thursday, December 15	President Biden meets with African leaders in the United States–Africa Leaders Summit 2022.; President Biden releases new de-classified documents of the JFK assassination.; President Biden mocks his predecessor Donald Trump's announcement of trading cards on Twitter.	President Biden with African leaders
Friday, December 16	The Biden family holds a private memorial to mark the 50th anniversary of the death of Joe Biden's first wife Neilia Biden and their infant daughter Naomi in a car accident.; President Biden signs a short-term funding bill, averting the shutdown of the U.S. government.	
Saturday, December 17		
Sunday, December 18		
Monday, December 19	President Biden holds a bilateral meeting with Ecuadorian President Guillermo Lasso at the White House.	President Biden and Ecuadorian President Guillermo Lasso
Tuesday, December 20		
Wednesday, December 21	President Biden holds a bilateral meeting and joint press conference with Ukrainian President Volodymyr Zelenskyy at the White House. Zelenskyy later addressed a joint session of congress. (Note: For more details, see 2022 visit by Volodymyr Zelenskyy to the United States.); During a visit to Washington DC, Ukrainian president Volodymyr Zelenskyy presents the medal to the Democrat.	President Biden and Ukrainian President Volodymyr Zelenskyy
Thursday, December 22		
Friday, December 23		
Saturday, December 24		
Sunday, December 25	President Biden celebrates the second Christmas Day of his administration.	President Biden and First Lady Jill Biden decorating a Christmas tree
Monday, December 26		
Tuesday, December 27	President Biden and First Lady Jill Biden travel to the US Virgin Islands, vacationing there until after the new year.	
Wednesday, December 28		
Thursday, December 29	President Biden signs the Consolidated Appropriations Act of 2023 into law.	President Biden signs the Consolidated Appropriations Act of 2023
Friday, December 30	President Biden issues pardons for six individuals, including five convicted of drug-related offenses and one convicted for murder.	
Saturday, December 31	President Biden releases a statement on the death of Pope Emeritus Benedict XVI.; President Biden celebrates the second New Year's Day countdown of his administration in the Virgin Islands.	

== See also ==
- First 100 days of the Biden presidency – Period from January to April 2021
- List of executive actions by Joe Biden
- Lists of presidential trips made by Joe Biden (international trips)
- Presidential transition of Joe Biden – Transfer of presidential power from Donald Trump to Joe Biden
- Timeline of the 2020 United States presidential election

== Notes ==
U.S. presidential administration timelines
Preceded by Biden presidency (2022 Q3)	Biden presidency (2022 Q4)	Succeeded by Biden presidency (2023 Q1)
