= Treaty Room =

Room in the White House

Coordinates: 38.8976°N 77.0364°W

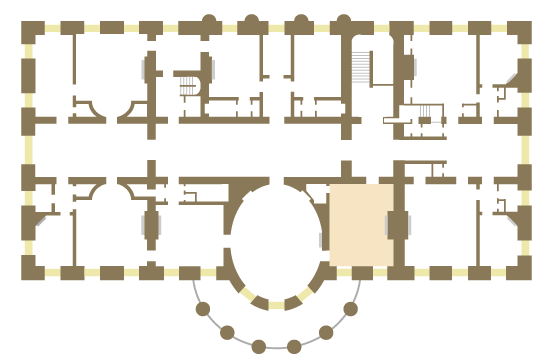
Floor plan of the White House second floor showing location of the Treaty Room.

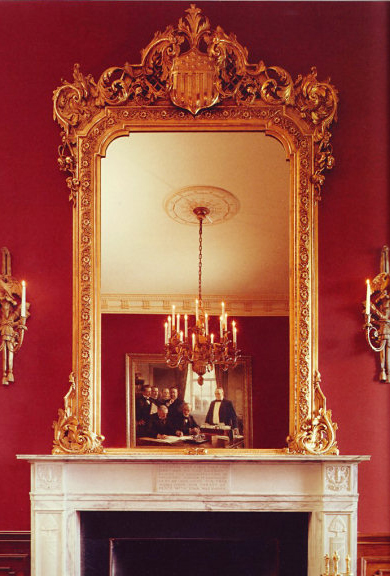
West wall of the Treaty Room during the Clinton administration showing the overmantel mirror.

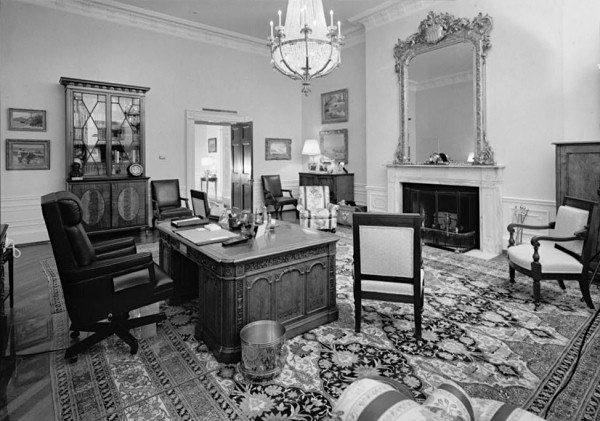
The Resolute desk in the Treaty Room in 1992 during the term of George H. W. Bush

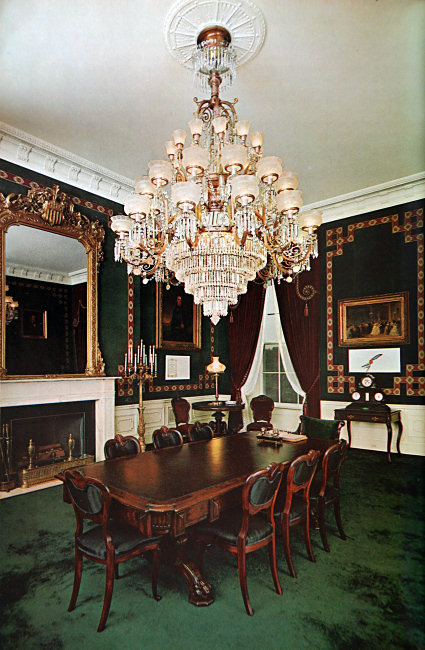
The Treaty Room as decorated by Stéphane Boudin during the administration of John F. Kennedy The printed borders reproduce the wallpaper in the room where Lincoln died at the Petersen House.

The Treaty Room is located on the second floor of the White House, the official residence of the president of the United States. The room is a part of the first family's private apartments and is used as a study by the president.

== History ==
Before construction of the West Wing of the White House, working offices were located on the east side of the second floor. The Treaty Room has been used as a waiting room, a cabinet room, and the president's office. President Andrew Johnson used the room for his cabinet meetings. Ulysses S. Grant continued this use and acquired a large Renaissance Revival style table to be used by his cabinet. The table remained in the room for many years, and President William McKinley oversaw the signing of the peace treaty with Spain which concluded the Spanish–American War on it on August 12, 1898.

Old engravings, photographs and stereographs show a succession of ornate printed wall and ceiling papers, highly figured axminster carpets, and ornate gas lighting fixtures. During the administration of Theodore Roosevelt this room was greatly simplified as a part of an overall refurbishment of the house directed by Charles Follen McKim. Victorian decoration was removed, and the underlying wood floor was exposed. Low bookcases were constructed, and the room began use as the president's in-residence study.

During the administration of Herbert Hoover, the room underwent an extensive redecorating project by First Lady Lou Henry Hoover to restore it to its Monroe era appearance and was used as a parlor or sitting room and was termed the Monroe Room. James Monroe's French Empire center table was moved to the room, and a copy of the desk he signed the Monroe Doctrine upon was placed in the room. Additional efforts were made during the administration of Franklin Delano Roosevelt to furnish the room somewhat as it might have been when the house was built. Following the Truman reconstruction of the White House, the room was furnished by the interior design department of the New York department store B. Altman and Company. Nearly all the furniture was contemporary, generally in a traditional style.

During the administration of John F. Kennedy, Jacqueline Kennedy worked with Stéphane Boudin of the House of Jansen to create a room that would represent a part of the house's Victorian era history. A palette of deep greens, burgundy and gold was adopted. President Grant's table was returned to the room along with an electrified gas chandelier once located in the East Room. The walls recreated a mid-nineteenth century treatment of ornamental frames of decorative paper based on the wallpaper in the room Abraham Lincoln was taken to and died in, in a house opposite Ford's Theater. A large gilded Rococo Revival overmantel mirror, with an American shield, which had once been hung in the Green Room was installed. Theobald Chartran's painting Signing of the Peace Protocol Between Spain and the United States, August 12, 1898 was hung in the room along with copies of several treaties signed at the White House. Drapery was based on a design of Lincoln's era. President Kennedy signed the Nuclear Test Ban Treaty in the room in 1963. Boudin's design survived into the administration of George H. W. Bush who had the room painted a light green and simple printed chintz curtains installed.

During the administration of Bill Clinton interior designer Kaki Hockersmith furnished the room in a mix of late American Empire and Victorian. Walls were covered with a simulated leather of a deep claret red and a gilded chandelier with an American eagle, one of several purchased during Theodore Roosevelt's administration for the residence and West Wing, was hung.

During the administration of George W. Bush, interior designer Ken Blasingame had the walls painted off-white, replaced the Clinton drapery with simple panels of olive green velvet hung on wooden poles, and replaced the Empire style chandelier with an electrified Victorian crystal gasolier. The Treaty Room has also been home to The Peacemakers, a large oil painting depicting U.S. President Lincoln in the final months of the American Civil War.

President Bush addressed the nation from the Treaty Room on October 7, 2001, announcing that the War in Afghanistan had begun. In his memoirs Decision Points, Bush referred to the Treaty Room as "one of my favorite places in the White House." On April 14, 2021, President Joe Biden spoke from the same room to announce that the United States would withdraw virtually all remaining United States troops in Afghanistan by September 11, 2021.

President Barack Obama used the Treaty Room as one of his primary working offices.

President Joe Biden used it as his primary working office during his two periods of isolation following his COVID-19 positive test and his second positive test due to Paxlovid rebound.
