= Robert McCurdy =

Robert McCurdy may refer to:

- Robert McCurdy (artist) (born 1952), American artist
- Robert McCurdy (politician) (1836–1896), Canadian American businessman and politician in Wisconsin
- Robert Henry McCurdy (1800–1880), American businessman and political candidate
- Bob McCurdy (1952–2020), American college basketball player
- USS Robert H. McCurdy, a United States Navy patrol vessel
