= List of presidential trips made by Joe Biden (2022) =

This is a list of presidential trips made by Joe Biden during 2022, the second year of his presidency as the 46th president of the United States.

This list excludes trips made within Washington, D.C., the US federal capital in which the White House, the official residence and principal workplace of the president, is located. Also excluded are trips to Camp David, the country residence of the president, as well as Joint Base Andrews. International trips are included. The number of visits per state or territory where he traveled were:

- One: Alabama, Arizona, Georgia, Guam, Hawaii, Iowa, Kentucky, Minnesota, Nevada, New Hampshire, New Jersey, Puerto Rico, South Carolina, US Virgin Islands, and Washington
- Two: Alaska, Colorado, Florida, Illinois, Michigan, New Mexico, North Carolina, Oregon, Texas, and Wisconsin
- Three: California
- Four: Massachusetts and Ohio
- Seven: Virginia
- Eight: New York
- Nine: Maryland
- Eleven: Pennsylvania
- Thirty-one: Delaware

International

- (5 trips to 13 countries)

Locations in the contiguous United States that President Joe Biden has visited in 2022.

January (blue) – February (yellow) – March (brown) – April (pink) – May (grey) – June (orange) – July (purple) – August (light blue) – September (magenta) – October (green) – November (red) –

December (light green)
Locations in Alaska that President Joe Biden has visited.
Locations in Puerto Rico that President Joe Biden has visited.
Locations in Guam that President Joe Biden has visited.
Locations in Hawaii that President Joe Biden has visited.
Locations in US Virgin Islands that President Joe Biden has visited.

== January ==
Country/ U.S. state	Areas visited	Dates	Details	Image
Delaware	Wilmington	January 1–3	President Biden and First Lady Dr. Jill Biden continued their New Year's vacation at their Delaware home. On Saturday, President Biden attended Mass at St. Ann Catholic Church.	
Colorado	Louisville	January 7	Arriving via Denver International Airport and flying to Rocky Mountain Metropolitan Airport on Marine One, President Biden and First Lady Dr. Jill Biden visited and surveyed damage from the 2021–2022 Boulder County fires. They toured a neighborhood and met the families who were impacted by the Marshall Fire. They also delivered remarks on response to recent wildfires at Louisville Recreation & Senior Center.	
Nevada	Las Vegas	January 7–8	Arriving via Harry Reid International Airport, President Biden and First Lady Dr. Jill Biden spent the night at Vdara. On January 8, they attended the funeral of former Senator Harry Reid at Smith Center for the Performing Arts. They were joined by Vice President Kamala Harris, Second Gentleman Doug Emhoff, former president Barack Obama, former First Lady Michelle Obama, House Speaker Nancy Pelosi and Senate Majority Leader Chuck Schumer. They then traveled to Camp David for the weekend.	
Georgia	Atlanta	January 11	Arriving via Hartsfield–Jackson Atlanta International Airport, President Biden and Vice President Kamala Harris participated in a wreath-laying ceremony at the crypt of Martin Luther King Jr. and his wife Coretta Scott King at King Center for Nonviolent Social Change. They visited in Ebenezer Baptist Church. They delivered remarks on the demand on passage of voting rights legislation at the Atlanta University Center on the grounds of Clark Atlanta University and Morehouse College.	
Virginia	Arlington	January 12	President Biden and First Lady Dr. Jill Biden attended the funeral of General Raymond T. Odierno at Joint Base Myer–Henderson Hall.	
Delaware	Wilmington, Greenville	January 14–17	Arriving via Brandywine Creek State Park on Marine One, President Biden visited his Delaware home for Martin Luther King Jr. Day weekend. On Saturday, he played round of golf at Fieidstone Golf Club with his grandson Hunter Biden and he attended Mass at St. Joseph on the Brandywine in Greenville.	
Pennsylvania	Philadelphia	January 16	President Biden and First Lady Dr. Jill Biden visited Philadelphia, where they volunteered at the food bank Philabundance to commemorate the Martin Luther King Jr. Day holiday. They then returned to Wilmington.	
Pennsylvania	Pittsburgh	January 28	Arriving via Allegheny County Airport, President Biden visited the site of collapsed Fern Hollow Bridge. He visited and delivered remarks on the Infrastructure Investment and Jobs Act at Carnegie Mellon University – Mill 16.	
Virginia	Fairfax County	January 30	President Biden and First Lady Dr. Jill Biden flew on Marine One to attend the National Governors Association's Black Tie Dinner at Mount Vernon.	

== February ==
Country/ U.S. state	Areas visited	Dates	Details	Image
New York	Manhattan, Queens	February 3	Arriving via John F. Kennedy International Airport, President Biden visited the headquarters of NYPD for a Gun Violence Strategies Partnership meeting. He was joined by Attorney General Merrick Garland, New York Governor Kathy Hochul and New York City Mayor Eric Adams. They then visited P.S. 111 Jacob Blackwell to discuss community violence intervention program.	
Maryland	Upper Marlboro	February 4	President Biden delivered remarks and signed an executive order on Project Labor Agreement at Ironworkers Local 5.	
Delaware	Wilmington, Greenville	February 4–6	Arriving via Wilmington-New Castle Airport, President Biden visited his Delaware home for weekend. On Saturday, he attended Mass with his daughter Ashley Biden at St. Joseph on the Brandywine in Greenville.	
Virginia	Culpeper	February 10	Arriving via Culpeper Regional Airport on Marine One, President Biden delivered remarks on lower health care costs, including prescription drug costs for American families at Germanna Community College – Daniel Technology Center.	
Ohio	Cleveland, Lorain	February 17	Arriving via Cleveland Hopkins International Airport, President Biden delivered remarks on the Infrastructure Investment and Jobs Act at The Shipyards.	
Delaware	Wilmington, Greenville	February 25–28	Arriving via Wilmington-New Castle Airport on Marine One, President Biden and First Lady Dr. Jill Biden visited their Delaware home for the weekend. On Saturday, President Biden held a video conference with his National Security Team about the ongoing 2022 Russian invasion of Ukraine and attended Mass at St. Joseph on the Brandywine in Greenville. On Sunday, he and First Lady Dr. Jill Biden attended of memorial service of Joan Olivere at Wilmington County Club.	

== March ==
Country/ U.S. state	Areas visited	Dates	Details	Image
Wisconsin	Superior	March 2	Arriving via Duluth International Airport, President Biden and First Lady Dr. Jill Biden visited John A. Blatnik Bridge. They delivered remarks on the Infrastructure Investment and Jobs Act at the University of Wisconsin–Superior Yellowjacket Union.	
Delaware	Wilmington, Greenville	March 4–6	Arriving via Wilmington-New Castle Airport on Marine One, President Biden visited his Delaware home for the weekend. On Saturday, he met with Secretary of Labor Marty Walsh and national labor union leaders at Hotel du Pont and attended Mass at St. Joseph on the Brandywine in Greenville.	
Texas	Fort Worth	March 8	Arriving via Naval Air Station Joint Reserve Base Fort Worth, President Biden and Secretary of Veteran Affairs Denis McDonough visited the Fort Worth VA Clinic received a briefing on their primary care and specialty health services for veterans. They delivered remarks on health care and benefits for veterans at Tarrant County Resource Connection.	
Pennsylvania	Philadelphia	March 11	Arriving via Philadelphia International Airport, President Biden delivered remarks at the House Democratic Caucus Issues Conference at Hilton Philadelphia at Penn's Landing. He toured at Hon. Luis Munoz-Marin Elementary School on highlighting the American Rescue Plan on its first anniversary. He then traveled to Camp David for the weekend.	
Delaware	Rehoboth Beach	March 18–20	Arriving via Cape Henlopen State Park on Marine One, President Biden visited his Delaware beach home for the weekend. On Saturday, he attended Mass at St. Edmond Catholic Church. On Sunday, he went on a bike ride at Cape Henlopen State Park before returning to Washington.	
Belgium	Brussels	March 23–25	Arriving via Brussels Airport, President Biden spent the night at Brand Whitlock Hall. On March 24, President Biden attended and delivered remarks at an extraordinary NATO Summit at NATO Headquarters to discuss the ongoing 2022 Russian invasion of Ukraine. He also attended and delivered remarks at a G7 Leaders Meeting at NATO Headquarters. He held a bilateral meeting with European Council President Charles Michel. He joined and delivered remarks at a European Council Summit at Europa building. On March 25, President Biden held a bilateral meeting with European Commission President Ursula von der Leyen.	
Poland	Rzeszów, Warsaw	March 25–26	Arriving via Rzeszów–Jasionka Airport, President Biden received a briefing on the humanitarian response to ease the suffering of civilians inside Ukraine. He met with service members from the 82nd Airborne Division, who are contributing alongside our Polish Ally to deterrence on the Alliances Eastern Flank. He flew to Warsaw Chopin Airport, spent the night at Marriott Hotel Warsaw. On March 26, President Biden held a bilateral meeting with President Andrzej Duda at the Presidential Palace. He met refugees at Stadion Narodowy and talked with Prime Minister Mateusz Morawiecki and Mayor of Warsaw Rafał Trzaskowski. He met with the Ministers of Foreign Affairs and Defense of Ukraine. He delivered a speech on the united efforts of the free world to support the people of Ukraine in the courtyard of Royal Castle.	
United Kingdom	Mildenhall	March 26	President Biden briefly stopped at RAF Mildenhall as Air Force One was getting refueled. He returned to Washington on Sunday.	

== April ==
Country/ U.S. state	Areas visited	Dates	Details	Image
Delaware	Wilmington, Greenville	April 1–4	Arriving via Wilmington-New Castle Airport on Marine One, President Biden visited his Delaware home for the weekend. On Saturday, he and First Lady Dr. Jill Biden delivered remarks at a commissioning commemoration ceremony of the USS Delaware (SSN-791) at Port of Wilmington. Then, President Biden attended Mass at St. Joseph on the Brandywine in Greenville. On Sunday, he played a round of golf at the Fieldstone Golf Club.	
Delaware	Wilmington, Greenville	April 9–11	Flying from The Pentagon to Wilmington-New Castle Airport on Marine One, President Biden and First Lady Dr. Jill Biden visited their Delaware home for the weekend. Upon arrival, President Biden attended Mass at St. Joseph on the Brandywine in Greenville.	
Iowa	Menlo	April 12	Arriving via Des Moines International Airport, President Biden discussed Infrastructure Investment and Jobs Act investments in rural communities at POET Bioprocessing Menlo.	
North Carolina	Greensboro	April 14	Arriving via Piedmont Triad International Airport, President Biden visited Harold L. Martin Sr. Engineering Research & Innovation Complex. He discussed Bipartisan Innovation Act and Infrastructure Investment and Jobs Act at North Carolina A&T State University. He then traveled to Camp David via Hagerstown Regional Airport for Easter weekend.	
New Hampshire	Portsmouth	April 19	Arriving via Portsmouth International Airport, President Biden delivered remarks on the Infrastructure Investment and Jobs Act at New Hampshire Port Authority.	
Oregon	Portland	April 21	Arriving via Portland Air National Guard Base, President Biden delivered remarks on the Infrastructure Investment and Jobs Act at Portland International Airport. He attended a fundraiser for the Democratic National Committee at Portland Yacht Club.	
Washington	Seattle, Auburn	April 21–22	Arriving Seattle-Tacoma International Airport, President Biden attended a fundraiser for the Democratic National Committee at a private residence. He spent the night at Westin Seattle. On April 22, President Biden delivered remarks on Earth Day, tackle the climate crisis at Seward Park. He also delivered remarks on lower health care and energy costs at Green River College.	
Delaware	Wilmington, Greenville	April 22–25	Arriving via Philadelphia International Airport and flying to Wilmington-New Castle Airport on Marine One, President Biden visited his Delaware home for the weekend. On Saturday, he attended Mass at St. Joseph on the Brandywine in Greenville. On Sunday, he played a round of golf at the Fieldstone Golf Club.	

== May ==
Country/ U.S. state	Areas visited	Dates	Details	Image
Minnesota	Minneapolis	May 1	Arriving via Minneapolis–Saint Paul International Airport, President Biden attended the memorial service of former vice president Walter Mondale at Northrop Auditorium on the campus of the University of Minnesota.	
Alabama	Troy	May 3	Arriving via Montgomery Airport and flying to Troy Municipal Airport on Marine One, President Biden visited and delivered remarks at the Lockheed Martin facility in Troy that manufactures Javelin anti-tank missiles, and also the noted the facility's importance in arming Ukraine during the ongoing 2022 Russian invasion of Ukraine.	
Ohio	Hamilton	May 6	Arriving via Cincinnati/Northern Kentucky International Airport, President Biden met the manufacturing leaders and delivered remarks on calling the Congress to pass legislation like the Bipartisan Innovation Act at United Performance Metals.	
Delaware	Wilmington, Greenville	May 6–9	Arriving via Wilmington-New Castle Airport, President Biden visited his Delaware home for the weekend. On Saturday, he attended Mass and visited the burial site of his mother Catherine Eugenia Finnegan Biden in honor of Mother's Day at St. Joseph on the Brandywine in Greenville. On Sunday, he participated in a virtual G7 Leaders meeting along with Ukrainian president Volodymyr Zelenskyy. He later played a round of golf at the Fieldstone Golf Club and afterwards visited Hallie Biden, the widow of his late son Beau Biden, at her home in Wilmington.	
Maryland	Potomac	May 9	President Biden attended a fundraising reception for the Democratic National Committee at the home of Congressman David Trone and June Trone.	
Illinois	Kankakee, Chicago	May 11	Arriving via Chicago O'Hare International Airport and flying to Greater Kankakee Airport on Marine One, President Biden visited OConnor Farm in Kankakee and delivered remarks on price hike and his actions to lower costs for farmers and food processors. Then he addressed the 40th International Brotherhood of Electrical Workers International Convention at McCormick Place and afterwards attended a fundraising reception for the Democratic National Committee at Marriott Marquis Chicago.	
Delaware	Wilmington, Greenville	May 13–15	Arriving via Wilmington-New Castle Airport, President Biden visited his Delaware home for the weekend. On Saturday, he played a round of golf at the Fieldstone Golf Club and attended Mass at St. Joseph on the Brandywine in Greenville.	
New York	Buffalo	May 17	Arriving via Buffalo Niagara International Airport, President Biden and First Lady Dr. Jill Biden traveled to Buffalo following the mass shooting which occurred on May 14 and claimed the lives of ten people at Tops Friendly Markets. They met the family of the victims and delivered remarks at Delavan Grider Community Center.	
Maryland	Prince George's County	May 18	President Biden flew on Marine One to Joint Base Andrews to receive an important briefing about the upcoming 2022 Atlantic hurricane season.	
Alaska	Anchorage	May 19	President Biden briefly stopped at Joint Base Elmendorf–Richardson as Air Force One was getting refueled, while on the way to his state visits to South Korea and Japan.	
South Korea	Seoul, Pyeongtaek	May 20–22	Arriving via Osan Air Base, President Biden met with South Korean president Yoon Suk-yeol and they visited and delivered remarks on Bipartisan Innovation Act at Samsung Electronics Pyeongtaek Campus. President Biden flew to Garrison Yongsan Landing Zone on Marine One and spent the night at Grand Hyatt Seoul, On May 21, President Biden participated in a wreath-laying ceremony at Seoul National Cemetery to honor the victims of the Korean War. President Biden held a bilateral meeting with South Korean president Yoon Suk-yeol at People's House. They attended state dinner at National Museum of Korea. On May 22, President Biden delivered remarks with Chairman of Hyundai Motor Group. He greet with staff of U.S. Embassy at Dragon Hill Lodge. He also delivered remarks at the Air Operations Centers Combat Operations Floor, met the service members and military families at Osan Air Base, before heading to Japan.	
Japan	Tokyo	May 22–24	Arriving via Yokota Air Base and flying to Hardy Barracks Landing Zone on Marine One, President Biden spent the night at Hotel Okura Tokyo. On May 23, President Biden met with Emperor Naruhito at Tokyo Imperial Palace. He held bilateral meeting with Japanese prime minister Fumio Kishida, they met with families of Japanese citizens abducted by North Korea at Akasaka Palace. They attended dinner at Kochan. President Biden launched the Indo-Pacific Economic Framework for Prosperity at Izumi Garden Gallery. On May 24, President Biden attended the QUAD Leaders Summit, also held bilateral meetings with India Prime Minister Narendra Modi and Australia Prime Minister Anthony Albanese at Kantei Palace.	
Alaska	Anchorage	May 24	President Biden briefly stopped at Joint Base Elmendorf–Richardson as Air Force One was getting refueled, while on his return trip from South Korea and Japan.	
Maryland	Annapolis	May 27	President Biden delivered the Commencement Address at Navy–Marine Corps Memorial Stadium on the campus of the United States Naval Academy.	
Delaware	Wilmington, Newark	May 27–29	Arriving via Wilmington-New Castle Airport, President Biden visited his Delaware home for Memorial Day weekend. On Saturday, President Biden delivered the commencement address at Delaware Stadium on the campus of his alma mater, the University of Delaware.	
Texas	Uvalde	May 29	Arriving via Kelly Field in San Antonio and flying to Garner Field on Marine One, President Biden and First Lady Dr. Jill Biden traveled to Uvalde following the mass shooting which occurred on May 24 and claimed the lives of twenty-one people at Robb Elementary School. They attended Mass at Sacred Heart Catholic Church. They visited families of victims and survivors at Uvalde County Event Center. They returned to Wilmington.	
Delaware	Wilmington, Greenville	May 29–30	Arriving via Wilmington-New Castle Airport, President Biden and First Lady Dr. Jill Biden returned to Wilmington to spend again the Memorial Day weekend at their Delaware home. On Monday, they attended Mass and visited the burial site of their late son Beau Biden at their home parish, St. Joseph on the Brandywine in Greenville, on the seventh anniversary of his death.	
Virginia	Arlington	May 30	President Biden and First Lady Dr. Jill Biden participated in a wreath-laying ceremony at the Tomb of the Unknown Soldier in Arlington National Cemetery on Memorial Day. They were joined by Vice President Kamala Harris, Second Gentleman Doug Emhoff, Secretary of Defense Lloyd Austin and Chairman of the Joint Chiefs of Staff Mark Milley. President Biden delivered the Memorial Day address at the Memorial Amphitheater.	

== June ==
Country/ U.S. state	Areas visited	Dates	Details	Image
Delaware	Rehoboth Beach	June 2–5	Arriving via Dover Air Force Base and flying to Cape Henlopen State Park on Marine One, President Biden visited his Delaware beach home for the weekend. On Saturday, he attended Mass at St. Edmond Catholic Church.	
California	Los Angeles, Beverly Hills	June 8–11	Arriving via Los Angeles International Airport and flying to Dodger Stadium Landing Zone on Marine One, President Biden taped his appearance on Jimmy Kimmel Live! at El Capitan Theatre. President Biden and First Lady Dr. Jill Biden participated in the inaugural ceremony of the 9th Summit of the Americas at Microsoft Theater, they were joined by Vice President Kamala Harris. On June 9, President Biden delivered remarks at the opening plenary of the 9th Summit of the Americas. He and Vice President Kamala Harris met with leaders of Caribbean nations. He held bilateral meetings with Canadian prime minister Justin Trudeau and Brazilian president Jair Bolsonaro at Los Angeles Convention Center. He and First Lady Dr. Jill Biden welcomed heads of state and government and their spouses for a dinner at Getty Villa. On June 10, President Biden delivered remarks on inflation at Port of Los Angeles. He attended two fundraiser for the Democratic National Committee at the home of Andrew Hauptman and the home of Haim and Cheryl Saban in Beverly Hills	
New Mexico	Santa Fe	June 11	Arriving via Kirtland Air Force Base, President Biden received a briefing on the New Mexico wildfires at New Mexico State Emergency Operation Center.	
Delaware	Wilmington, Greenville	June 11–13	Arriving via Philadelphia International Airport and flying to Wilmington-New Castle Airport on Marine One, President Biden visited his Delaware home for the weekend. On Sunday, he played a round of golf with Ron Olivere, father in law of late son Beau Biden at the Fieldstone Golf Club and attended Mass at St. Joseph on the Brandywine in Greenville.	
Pennsylvania	Philadelphia	June 14	Arriving via Philadelphia International Airport, President Biden delivered remarks at the 29th AFL–CIO Constitutional Convention at Pennsylvania Convention Center.	
Delaware	Rehoboth Beach	June 17–20	Arriving via Cape Henlopen State Park on Marine One, President Biden, First Lady Dr. Jill Biden, their daughter Ashley Biden and their granddaughters Naomi and Natalie visited their Delaware beach home for Juneteenth weekend. On Saturday, President Biden and First Lady Dr. Jill Biden went on a bike ride at Cape Henlopen State Park. Then, President Biden attended Mass at St. Edmond Catholic Church.	
Germany	Schloss Elmau	June 25–28	Arriving via Munich International Airport and flying to Schloss Elmau Landing Zone on Marine One, President Biden attended the 48th G7 summit and held a bilateral meeting with German chancellor Olaf Scholz. On June 28, President Biden met with German chancellor Olaf Scholz, British prime minister Boris Johnson and French president Emmanuel Macron on the margins of G7.	
Spain	Madrid	June 28–30	Arriving via Madrid–Torrejón Airport, where King Felipe VI welcomed him, President Biden held a bilateral meeting with Spanish prime minister Pedro Sánchez at Palace of Moncloa. He and First Lady Dr. Jill Biden attended dinner for heads of state and government and heads of international organizations at Royal Palace of Madrid. On June 29, President Biden attended the 32nd NATO Summit at IFEMA. He held a trilateral meeting with Japanese prime minister Fumio Kishida and South Korean president Yoon Suk-yeol. He held a bilateral meeting with Turkish president Recep Tayyip Erdoğan.	

== July ==
Country/ U.S. state	Areas visited	Dates	Details	Image
Ohio	Cleveland	July 6	Arriving via Cleveland Hopkins International Airport, President Biden delivered remarks on final rule implementing the American Rescue Plan Special Financial Assistance program at Max S. Hayes High School.	
Virginia	Langley	July 8	President Biden visited and delivered remarks at the headquarters of the Central Intelligence Agency (CIA) on its 75th founding anniversary.	
Delaware	Rehoboth Beach	July 8–10	Arriving via Cape Henlopen State Park on Marine One, President Biden visited his Delaware beach home for the weekend. On Saturday, he attended Mass at St. Edmond Catholic Church. On Sunday, he went on a bike ride at Cape Henlopen State Park.	
Israel	Tel Aviv, Jerusalem	July 13–15	Arriving via Ben Gurion Airport, where they were greeted by President Isaac Herzog, Prime Minister Yair Lapid, and Alternate Prime Minister Naftali Bennett, President Biden received a briefing from Ministry of Defense Benny Gantz on the Iron Dome and Iron Beam defensive weapons systems. He then traveled on Marine One to Jerusalem where he participated in a wreath-laying ceremony at Yad Vashem. He spent the night at King David Hotel. On July 14, President Biden held a bilateral meeting with Prime Minister Lapid and attended the inaugural I2U2 virtual summit at the Waldorf Astoria Jerusalem hotel. He met with President Herzog and former prime minister Benjamin Netanyahu at Beit HaNassi. He attended at the opening ceremony of 2022 Maccabiah Games and greeted U.S. athletes at Teddy Stadium.	
Palestinian Authority (West Bank)	East Jerusalem, Bethlehem	July 15	President Biden visited and delivered remarks at Augusta Victoria Hospital. He then met with President Mahmoud Abbas at the Presidential Palace and visited the Church of the Nativity before departing on Marine One to Ben Gurion Airport.	
Saudi Arabia	Jeddah	July 15–16	Arriving via King Abdulaziz International Airport, President Biden held a bilateral meeting with King Salman and Crown Prince Mohammed bin Salman at Al Salam Royal Palace. On July 16, President Biden attended the GCC+3 special summit and held bilateral meetings with Egyptian president Abdel Fattah el-Sisi, Iraqi prime minister Mustafa Al-Kadhimi and United Arab Emirates President Mohamed bin Zayed Al Nahyan at The Ritz-Carlton Jeddah.	
United Kingdom	Mildenhall	July 16	President Biden briefly stopped at RAF Mildenhall as Air Force One was getting refueled. He returned to Washington on Sunday.	
Massachusetts	Somerset	July 20	Arriving via Rhode Island T. F. Green International Airport, President Biden delivered remarks on the climate crisis and a clean energy future to create jobs and lower costs for families at the former Brayton Point Power Station.	

== August ==
Country/ U.S. state	Areas visited	Dates	Details	Image
Delaware	Rehoboth Beach	August 7–8	Arriving via Cape Henlopen State Park on Marine One, President Biden visited his Delaware beach home for the weekend. This was his first time he has traveled since his COVID-19 diagnosis. On Monday, he and First Lady Dr. Jill Biden flew on Marine One to Dover Air Force Base and then they traveled to Kentucky.	
Kentucky	Lost Creek	August 8	Arriving via Blue Grass Airport and flying to Wendell H. Ford Airport on Marine One, President Biden and First Lady Dr. Jill Biden participated in a briefing on the ongoing response efforts from the severe flooding at Marie Roberts Elementary School. They were joined by Kentucky Governor Andy Beshear and First Lady of Kentucky Britainy Beshear. They visited families of affected by the devastation from recent flooding and survey impacts and response efforts.	
South Carolina	Kiawah Island, Johns Island	August 10–16	Arriving via Charleston Air Force Base and flying to Charleston Executive Airport on Marine One, President Biden, Dr. Jill Biden, their son Hunter Biden, their granddaughter Finnegan and their grandson Beau traveled to Kiawah Island for their summer vacation. On Friday, President Biden played a round of golf at Turtle Point Golf Course. On Saturday, he and Hunter Biden attended Mass at Holy Spirit Catholic Church. On Monday, he and First Lady Dr. Jill Biden visited at Kiawah Island Beach Club.	
Delaware	Wilmington, Greenville, Rehoboth Beach	August 16–24	Flying from Fort Lesley J. McNair to Wilmington-New Castle Airport on Marine One, President Biden visited his Delaware home to continue his summer vacation. He played a round of golf with Ron Olivere on Wednesday and his brother James Biden on Friday at the Fieldstone Golf Club. On Saturday, he attended Mass at St. Joseph on the Brandywine in Greenville. Later, he flew from Brandywine Creek State Park to Cape Henlopen State Park on Marine One, with his daughter Ashley Biden and they visited their Delaware beach home to continue their summer vacation.	
Maryland	Bethesda, Rockville	August 25	President Biden visited a private residence for the Democratic National Committee reception in Bethesda. He held a campaign rally for the Democratic National Committee with Maryland Gubernatorial candidate Wes Moore at Richard Montgomery High School.	
Maryland	Laurel	August 26	Arriving via the United States Secret Service James J. Rowley Training Center on Marine One, President Biden made an appearance on Jay Leno's Garage with Jay Leno and Michael Powell.	
Delaware	Wilmington, Greenville	August 26–29	Arriving via Wilmington-New Castle Airport, President Biden visited his Delaware home for the weekend. On Saturday, he played a round of golf with Ron Olivere and his grandson Hunter Biden at the Fieldstone Golf Club and attended Mass at St. Joseph on the Brandywine in Greenville.	
Pennsylvania	Wilkes-Barre	August 30	Arriving via Wilkes-Barre/Scranton International Airport, President Biden delivered remarks on Bipartisan Safer Communities Act, intended to reduce gun violence and save lives at the Arnaud C. Marts Center on the campus of Wilkes University.	

== September ==
Country/ U.S. state	Areas visited	Dates	Details	Image
Pennsylvania	Philadelphia	September 1	Arriving via Philadelphia International Airport, President Biden delivered a primetime speech on Soul of the Nation at the outside of Independence Hall.	
Wisconsin	Milwaukee	September 5	Arriving via General Mitchell International Airport, President Biden delivered remarks at the Laborfest celebrations at the Henry Maier Festival Park.	
Pennsylvania	West Mifflin	September 5	Arriving via Pittsburgh International Airport and flying to Allegheny County Airport on Marine One, President Biden delivered remarks on celebrating Labor Day at the United Steelworkers of America Union Local 2227.	
Maryland	National Harbor	September 8	President Biden delivered remarks at the DNC Summer Meeting at Gaylord National Resort & Convention Center.	
Ohio	New Albany	September 9	Arriving via John Glenn Columbus International Airport, President Biden delivered remarks on rebuilding American manufacturing through CHIPS and Science Act at the groundbreaking ceremony of new Intel semiconductor facility.	
Delaware	Wilmington, Greenville	September 9–11	Arriving via Dover Air Force Base and flying to Wilmington-New Castle Airport on Marine One, President Biden visited his Delaware home for the weekend. On Saturday, he attended Mass at St. Joseph on the Brandywine in Greenville.	
Virginia	Arlington	September 11	President Biden participated in a wreath-laying ceremony at the Pentagon Memorial, he delivered remarks on the twenty-first anniversary of the September 11 attacks.	
Massachusetts	Boston	September 12	Arriving via Boston Logan International Airport, President Biden delivered remarks on the Infrastructure Investment and Jobs Act at Boston Logan International Airport Terminal E. He also delivered remarks on Cancer Moonshot on its 60th anniversary of President John F. Kennedy's Moonshot speech at the John F. Kennedy Library and Museum. He then participated in a reception for the Democratic National Committee.	
Delaware	Wilmington	September 13	Arriving via Wilmington-New Castle Airport, President Biden and First Lady Dr. Jill Biden cast their ballots in the Delaware primary election at the Tatnall School. They also stopped by at their Delaware home briefly, before returning to Washington.	
Michigan	Detroit	September 14	Arriving via Detroit Metropolitan Airport, President Biden toured and delivered remarks at the Detroit Auto Show at Huntington Place. He then participated in a reception for the Democratic National Committee.	
United Kingdom	London	September 17–19	Arriving via London Stansted Airport, President Biden and First Lady Dr. Jill Biden spent the night at Winfield House. On September 18, the couple paid respects to the recently deceased Queen Elizabeth II at her lying in state at Westminster Hall, and signed the Condolence Book at Lancaster House. They met with King Charles III and attended a reception at Buckingham Palace. On September 19, they attended Elizabeth's state funeral at Westminster Abbey.	
New York	New York City	September 20–22	Arriving via John F. Kennedy International Airport and flying to Manhattan Harbor on Marine One, President Biden participated in a reception for the Democratic National Committee at the home of Henry R. Muñoz III. He spent the night at InterContinental New York Barclay Hotel. On September 21, President Biden addressed at the United Nations General Assembly at the Headquarters of the United Nations. He held bilateral meetings with United Nations Secretary-General António Guterres and British prime minister Liz Truss. He delivered remarks on the Seventh Replenishment Conference for The Global Fund to Fight AIDS, Tuberculosis and Malaria at 583 Park Avenue. He and First Lady Dr. Jill Biden hosted the World Leaders Reception at the American Museum of Natural History. On September 22, President Biden held a bilateral meeting with Philippine president Bongbong Marcos. He received a briefing on Hurricane Fiona at One World Trade Center. He participated in a reception for the Democratic National Committee.	
Delaware	Wilmington, Hockessin, Greenville	September 24–26	Flying from Fort Lesley J. McNair to Wilmington-New Castle Airport on Marine One, President Biden and First Lady Dr. Jill Biden visited their Delaware home for the weekend. Upon arrival, President Biden attended his granddaughter Natalie's field hockey game at Sanford School and attended Mass at St. Joseph on the Brandywine in Greenville. On Sunday, he played a round of golf with Ron Olivere at the Fieldstone Golf Club.	

== October ==
Country/ U.S. state	Areas visited	Dates	Details	Image
Puerto Rico	Ponce	October 3	Arriving via Mercedita International Airport, President Biden and First Lady Dr. Jill Biden received a briefing and delivered remarks on Hurricane Fiona at Port of Ponce. They visited and met with families and community leaders impacted by Hurricane Fiona and participated in a community service project at Centro Sor Isolina Ferré Aguayo School.	
Florida	Fort Myers	October 5	Arriving via Southwest Florida International Airport, President Biden and First Lady Dr. Jill Biden surveyed the damage areas during the Hurricane Ian. They were joined by Florida Governor Ron DeSantis and First Lady of Florida Casey DeSantis. They received an operational briefing on current response and recovery efforts, met with small business owners and local residents impacted by Hurricane Ian, and remarked on rebuilding from the hurricane at Fishermans Wharf.	
New York	Poughkeepsie	October 6	Arriving via Stewart Air National Guard Base, President Biden delivered remarks on creating jobs in the Hudson Valley and lowering costs at IBM.	
New Jersey	Red Bank	October 6	Flying from Hudson Valley Regional Airport to Monmouth Executive Airport on Marine One, President Biden participated in a reception for the Democratic National Committee at the home of Governor of New Jersey Phil Murphy.	
New York	New York City	October 6	Arriving via Manhattan Harbor on Marine One, President Biden participated in a reception for the Democratic Senatorial Campaign Committee at the home of James Murdoch.	
Maryland	Hagerstown	October 7	Arriving via Hagerstown Regional Airport, President Biden toured and delivered remarks on building the economy at Volvo Group Powertrain Operations.	
Pennsylvania	Philadelphia	October 7	Arriving via Philadelphia International Airport, President Biden visited the University of Pennsylvania with his granddaughter Natalie of the late Beau Biden.	
Delaware	Wilmington, Greenville	October 7–10	Arriving via Wilmington-New Castle Airport on Marine One, President Biden visited his Delaware home for Columbus Day weekend. On Saturday, he attended Mass at St. Joseph on the Brandywine in Greenville.	
Colorado	Vail	October 12	Arriving via Eagle County Airport, President Biden delivered remarks on America's iconic outdoor spaces at Camp Hale.	
California	Los Angeles, Brentwood, Irvine	October 12–14	Arriving via Los Angeles International Airport and flying to Santa Monica Airport on Marine One. On October 13, President Biden delivered remarks on Infrastructure Investment and Jobs Act at the D Line (Los Angeles Metro). He also stopped by at Tacos 1986. He participated in a reception for the Democratic Congressional Campaign Committee at the home of Marcy Carsey in Brentwood. On October 14, President Biden flew to John Wayne Airport on Marine One and delivered remarks on lowering costs for American families at Irvine Valley College.	
Oregon	Portland	October 14–15	Arriving via Portland International Airport, President Biden participated in a grassroots volunteer event at SEIU Local 49. He spent the night at The Duniway Portland. On October 15, President Biden delivered remarks on lowering costs for American families at East Portland Community Center. He participated in a reception for Gubernatorial candidate Tina Kotek at Pacific Northwest Carpenters Institute. He also stopped by at a Baskin-Robbins before departing for Wilmington.	
Delaware	Wilmington, Greenville	October 15–17	Arriving via Wilmington-New Castle Airport, President Biden visited his Delaware home for the weekend. On Sunday, he attended Mass at St. Joseph on the Brandywine in Greenville and also stopped by at a Jos. A. Bank outlet in Greenville.	
Pennsylvania	Pittsburgh, Moon Township, Philadelphia	October 20	Arriving via Pittsburgh International Airport, President Biden delivered remarks on rebuilding infrastructure at Fern Hollow Bridge and stopped by at Primanti Bros. He then flew to Philadelphia International Airport and participated in a reception for Senate candidate John Fetterman at Union Trust.	
Delaware	Dover, Rehoboth Beach	October 21–23	Arriving via Dover Air Force Base, President Biden delivered remarks on Student debt relief at Delaware State University. He then flew to Cape Henlopen State Park on Marine One and visited his Delaware beach home for the weekend. On Saturday, he attended Mass at St. Edmond Catholic Church.	
New York	Syracuse	October 27	Arriving via Hancock Field Air National Guard Base, President Biden delivered remarks on Micron Technology to invest in CHIPS and Science Act at SRC Arena & Events Center on the campus of Onondaga Community College.	
Delaware	Wilmington	October 27–28	Arriving via Wilmington-New Castle Airport, President Biden spent the night at his Delaware home.	
Pennsylvania	Philadelphia	October 28	Arriving via Philadelphia International Airport on Marine One, President Biden delivered remarks at a reception for the Pennsylvania Democratic Party at Pennsylvania Convention Center. He was joined by Vice President Kamala Harris, Gubernatorial candidate Josh Shapiro, and Senate candidate John Fetterman.	
Delaware	Wilmington, Middletown, Greenville	October 28–31	Arriving via Wilmington-New Castle Airport on Marine One, President Biden returned to Wilmington to spend the weekend at his Delaware home. On Saturday, he attended his granddaughter Natalie's field hockey game at St. Andrew's School, and then they both cast their ballots by early voting. Then, he attended Mass at St. Joseph on the Brandywine in Greenville with his sister Valerie Biden Owens.	
New York	New York City	October 31	Arriving via John F. Kennedy International Airport and flying to Manhattan Harbor on Marine One, President Biden and First Lady Dr. Jill Biden attended a private memorial service of former Ambassador Donald M. Blinken at the Metropolitan Museum of Art.	

== November ==
Country/ U.S. state	Areas visited	Dates	Details	Image
Florida	Hallandale Beach, Golden Beach, Miami Gardens	November 1	Arriving via Fort Lauderdale International Airport, President Biden delivered remarks on social security, Medicare and lowering prescription drug costs at OB Johnson Park/Community Center. He then participated in a reception for former Governor and Gubernatorial candidate Charlie Crist. Then he flew from Gulfstream Park Landing Zone to Miami-Opa Locka Executive Airport on Marine One and held a campaign rally for Gubernatorial candidate Charlie Crist and Senate candidate Val Demings at Florida Memorial University.	
New Mexico	Albuquerque	November 3	Arriving via Kirtland Air Force Base, President Biden delivered remarks on Student debt relief at Central New Mexico Community College. He held a campaign rally for the Democratic Party with New Mexico Governor Michelle Lujan Grisham at Ted M. Gallegos Community Center.	
California	San Diego, Carlsbad	November 3–4	Arriving via Marine Corps Air Station Miramar, President Biden held a campaign event for Congressman Mike Levin at MiraCosta College. On November 4, President Biden delivered remarks on American technology company through CHIPS and Science Act at Viasat Inc.	
Illinois	Chicago, Joliet	November 4–5	Arriving via Chicago O'Hare International Airport, President Biden participated in a political reception for Illinois Governor J. B. Pritzker at Loews Hotel Tower. On November 5, President Biden delivered remarks on social security, Medicare and lowering prescription drug costs at Jones Elementary School.	
Pennsylvania	Philadelphia	November 5	Arriving via Philadelphia International Airport, President Biden held a campaign rally for Gubernatorial Candidate Josh Shapiro and Senate Candidate John Fetterman with former president Barack Obama at The Liacouras Center on the campus of Temple University.	
Delaware	Wilmington, Greenville	November 5–6	Arriving via Wilmington-New Castle Airport on Marine One, President Biden visited his Delaware home for the weekend. On Sunday, he attended Mass at St. Joseph on the Brandywine in Greenville.	
New York	Yonkers	November 6	Arriving via Westchester County Airport, President Biden held a campaign rally for New York Governor Kathy Hochul at Sarah Lawrence College.	
Maryland	Bowie	November 7	Arriving via the United States Secret Service James J. Rowley Training Center on Marine One, President Biden and First Lady Dr. Jill Biden held a campaign rally for Gubernatorial Candidate Wes Moore and Senator Chris Van Hollen at Bowie State University.	
Egypt	Sharm El Sheikh	November 11	Arriving via Sharm El Sheikh International Airport, President Biden attended and delivered remarks at the COP27 at Tonino Lamborghini International Convention Center. He also held a bilateral meeting with President Abdel Fattah el-Sisi.	
Cambodia	Phnom Penh	November 12–13	Arriving via Phnom Penh International Airport, President Biden held a bilateral meeting with Prime Minister Hun Sen and attended the U.S.–ASEAN Summit at Sokha Hotel. He attended East Asia Summit Gala Dinner at Chroy Changvar International Convention and Exhibition Center. He spent the night at Hotel Le Royal. On November 13, President Biden attended the 2022 East Asia Summit. He held a bilateral and trilateral meeting with Japanese prime minister Fumio Kishida and South Korean president Yoon Suk-yeol.	
Indonesia	Bali	November 13–16	Arriving via Ngurah Rai International Airport on Sunday night. On November 14, President Biden held a bilateral meetings with Indonesian president Joko Widodo at Apurva Kempinski and Chinese president Xi Jinping at Mulia Hotel. On November 15, President Biden attended the 2022 G20 Summit also met with European Commission president Ursula von der Leyen and Italian prime minister Giorgia Meloni at Apurva Kempinski. On November 16, President Biden participated in a mangrove tree planting at Hutan Mangrove Forest. He also held a bilateral meeting with British prime minister Rishi Sunak at Grand Hyatt Hotel.	
Guam	Yigo	November 16	President Biden briefly stopped at Andersen Air Force Base as Air Force One was getting refueled and he met with Governor Lou Leon Guerrero.	
Hawaii	Honolulu	November 16	President Biden briefly stopped at Joint Base Pearl Harbor–Hickam as Air Force One was getting refueled and he met with Governor David Ige.	
North Carolina	Havelock	November 21	Arriving via Cunningham Field, President Biden and First Lady Dr. Jill Biden participated in Thanksgiving Dinner with service members and military families as part of the Joining Forces initiative at Marine Corps Air Station Cherry Point.	
Massachusetts	Nantucket	November 22–27	Arriving via Nantucket Memorial Airport, President Biden, First Lady Dr. Jill Biden, their son Hunter Biden, their daughter Ashley Biden and their grandson Beau traveled to Nantucket for the Thanksgiving Holiday and they stayed at David Rubenstein's home. On November 24, they visited at Nantucket Fire Department. On November 25, they attended Christmas tree lighting ceremony. On November 26, they attended Mass at St. Mary, Our Lady of the Isle Catholic Church.	
Michigan	Bay City	November 29	Arriving via MBS International Airport, President Biden toured and discussed on economic plan, manufacturing boom, growing the economy, and creating good-paying jobs in Michigan and across the country at SK Siltron CSS Facility.	

== December ==
Country/ U.S. state	Areas visited	Dates	Details	Image
Massachusetts	Boston	December 2	Arriving via Boston Logan International Airport, President Biden met Prince William at the John F. Kennedy Presidential Library and Museum. He participated in an International Brotherhood of Electrical Workers phone bank at IBEW Local 103. He also participated in a reception for the Democratic Senatorial Campaign Committee. He then traveled to Camp David for the weekend.	
Arizona	Phoenix	December 6	Arriving via Luke Air Force Base, President Biden toured and discussed on economic plan, manufacturing boom, rebuilding supply chains, and creating good-paying jobs in Arizona and across the country at TSMC.	
Virginia	Arlington	December 12	President Biden and First Lady Dr. Jill Biden participated in a United States Marine Corps Reserve Toys for Tots on its 75th anniversary at Joint Base Myer–Henderson Hall.	
Delaware	Wilmington, New Castle	December 15–16	Arriving via Wilmington-New Castle Airport, President Biden spent the night at his Delaware home. On Friday, President Biden participated in a town hall and spoke with veterans and veteran survivors to discuss the historic expansion of benefits and services resulting from the PACT Act at Major Joseph R. "Beau" Biden III National Guard/Reserve Center before returning to Washington for the rest of the afternoon.	
Delaware	Wilmington, Greenville	December 16–19	Arriving via Wilmington-New Castle Airport on Marine One, President Biden, First Lady Dr. Jill Biden, their son Hunter Biden and their grandson Beau visited their Delaware home for the weekend. On Saturday, President Biden stopped by at a Jos. A. Bank outlet in Greenville, played round of golf at Fieldstone Golf Club and also attended Mass at St. Joseph on the Brandywine with First Lady Dr. Jill Biden and his sister Valerie Biden Owens. On Sunday, they returned to St. Joseph on the Brandywine to attended Mass and visited the burial site of his first wife Neilia Hunter Biden and first daughter Naomi on their 50th anniversary of their death.	
U.S. Virgin Islands	St. Croix	December 27–31	Arriving via Henry E. Rohlsen Airport, President Biden, First Lady Dr. Jill Biden, their daughter Ashley Biden, their granddaughter Natalie and their grandson Hunter traveled to St. Croix for New Year's Holiday. On Friday, President Biden and his grandson Hunter played a round of golf at The Buccaneer Beach and Golf Resort. Afterwards, President Biden and First Lady Dr. Jill Biden taped their appearance on ABC's Dick Clark's New Year's Rockin' Eve with Ryan Seacrest.	

== See also ==
- List of international presidential trips made by Joe Biden
- Lists of presidential trips made by Joe Biden
