= Sharon Sprung =

American artist

Sharon Sprung is an American painter based in Brooklyn, New York. She is primarily known for her portrait paintings such as Congressional portraits of Jeannette Rankin and Patsy Mink, as well as former First Lady Michele Obama's official White House portrait. She is an instructor at the Art Students League of New York.

== Early life and education ==
Sprung grew up in Glen Cove, New York. When she was 6, her father died and she did not speak for a year. She developed an early interest in portrait painting after all the pictures of him were destroyed and she had to rely on memory to remember his face. Her mother did not initially agree with her decision to pursue an art career, but in 1975 an Elizabeth Greenshields Foundation grant enabled her to get a start. She began taking classes at the Art Student League in New York City, where she had classes with Daniel E. Greene and Harvey Dinnerstein, and briefly attended Cornell University but dropped out, unsatisfied with the art scene there.

== Career ==
Sprung is known for portraits that operate in the tension between realism and abstraction, with distinct elements of both figurative and abstract painting. According to The Artist's Magazine, she "feels that the best realistic painting is actually good abstraction". She primarily works with oil paints on wood panels and calls her work "contemporary realism", with influences including Velazquez, Caravaggio, Egon Shiele, Kathe Kollwitz, and Diane Arbus.

She is especially known for portraits of women, including a series of paintings of young single mothers who lived near her in Brooklyn. As her work became more visible, she started taking on commissions around 2007.

=== Teaching ===
Sprung started teaching at the Art Student League of New York in 2004. In her classes, she often performs a demonstration in which she finishes a portrait and explains the process over the course of a semester. She encourages students to devote more of their class time looking at the model for their portraits than actually painting, to avoid self-criticism, and refrain from naming individual parts of the subject. She is also a long-time teacher at the National Academy School, and received a Lifetime Achievement award from its museum. Though known primarily as a painter, she also teaches drawing.

=== Congressional portraits ===
In 2004, Sprung was commissioned by the House of Representatives to paint a portrait of Jeannette Rankin. Rankin, a suffragist and the first woman elected to the House in 1917, is depicted holding a newspaper with a story of her being sworn in. Sprung learned what Rankin wore when she was sworn in, rented a costume, hired a model, and found a copy of the newspaper to produce the scene in the painting. Years later, in 2022, she painted the first woman of color in Congress, Patsy Takemoto Mink. Mink's portrait includes colors and shapes inspired by the Pacific Ocean and her home state of Hawaii.

=== Michelle Obama portrait ===
Sprung was commissioned to paint former First Lady Michelle Obama's official White House portrait by the White House Historical Association. She painted it over the course of nine months, facing minor challenges in White House protocol when she wanted to move things around in different rooms to improve the lighting or the scene. The portraits are typically unveiled during the succeeding president's administration, but the Trump administration never held the ceremony for the Obamas, so Sprung kept the completed portrait in her studio. The non-disclosure agreement she signed meant she had to keep it hidden from view for six years until the Bidens held an unveiling in 2022. when it was displayed alongside a painting of Barack Obama by Robert McCurdy. At the event, the former president thanked Sprung for "capturing everything I love about Michelle, her grace, her intelligence -- and the fact that she's fine".

The portrait depicts Obama sitting on a red sofa in the Red Room of the White House, wearing a turquoise off-the-shoulder dress designed by Jason Wu, who designed several garments for her in the past. Sprung based the painting on several photographs. According to Maegan Vazquez of CNN, the portrait shows Obama "appearing to take a brief moment to get comfortable inside one of the most formal rooms in the White House". Vazquez also noted that it was the first time such a portrait depicted someone in a strapless dress. Dan Kois of Slate said the portrait "pays tribute to the past while pulling presidential portraiture gently into the 21st century" and praised the gilded frame. Will Heinrich of the New York Times compared the portrait to those by other artists, noting the way Sprung's work "is a reminder that oil paint remains the best technology for really looking at someone" and presents a "compromise between the Obamas' desire to innovate and the imperative to respect the White House aesthetic".

== Personal life ==
Since 1980, Sprung has lived and worked in Brooklyn, New York, with her husband, a psychotherapist.
