= Robert McCurdy (artist) =

American artist (born 1952)

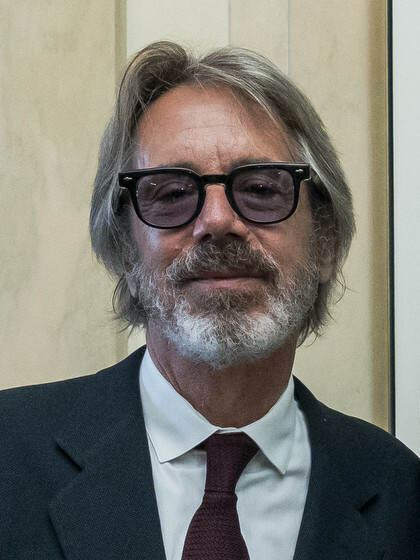
- McCurdy in 2022
- Born: 1952 (age 73–74); Harrisburg, Pennsylvania, U.S.
- Education: Maryland Institute College of Art (BFA, 1974)
- Known for: Portraiture
- Website: robertmccurdy.com

Robert McCurdy (born 1952) is an American artist known for his photorealistic oil paintings and photographs of notable figures in contemporary history. Among works held in the collections of the National Portrait Gallery in Washington, D.C., are paintings of Toni Morrison, Jane Goodall, Neil Armstrong, and others. In 2002, McCurdy was commissioned to paint a portrait of US Representative Martin Sabo for the US Capitol. He completed the official White House painting of former President Barack Obama in 2018. The portrait of President Obama was unveiled at a ceremony in the White House, simultaneously with the portrait of First Lady Michelle Obama by Sharon Sprung, on September 7, 2022.
