= Battle for the Soul of the Nation speech =

2022 speech by US President Joe Biden

"Battle for the Soul of the Nation"
- Video of the speech as published by the White House
- Date: 1 September 2022; 4 years ago
- Time: 8:03 P.M. EDT
- Venue: Independence Hall
- Location: Philadelphia, Pennsylvania; 39°56′56″N 75°9′0″W
- Participants: Joe Biden
- Website: Archives.gov

The Battle for the Soul of the Nation was a speech given by U.S. President Joe Biden on September 1, 2022, two months before the 2022 midterm elections. It was televised during prime time from the front of Philadelphia's Independence Hall. Biden was critical of Donald Trump and Republicans adhering to the Make America Great Again movement.

== Background ==
American politician Joe Biden anchored his 2020 Presidential candidacy on three fundamental pillars: the Battle for the Soul of our Nation, the Need to Rebuild our Middle Class, and a Call For Unity. His overarching vision for the country aimed to address the urgency and need for unity to impede the crises engulfing the nation. In September 2022, Biden delivered his remarks on the Battle for the Soul of our Nation, highlighting the endangerment of the country's equality and democracy.

In August 2017, a piece in the Atlantic was published entitled "We Are Living Through a Battle for the Soul of This Nation," referring to the events of the Unite the Right rally in Charlottesville, Virginia, and then-President Trump's public response to it. During the primary election season in April 2019, Biden echoed a similar message in a video, calling it "home to a defining moment for this nation." Following his victory in the 2020 United States presidential election, Biden again referred to this theme, saying "in this battle for the soul of America, democracy prevailed."

The speech was delivered approximately two months prior to the 2022 midterm elections. Regardless of Biden's poor approval ratings months prior to the address, legislative achievements by Democrats in Congress mended his numbers.

== Speech ==
The Battle for the Soul of the Nation was given outside the Independence Hall in Philadelphia, where the United States Declaration of Independence and the United States Constitution were debated and adopted by America's Founding Fathers. Biden delivered the speech in front of an audience of a few hundred guests.

A main theme of the speech was Donald Trump and his political allies, "MAGA Republicans", whom Biden described as a "semi-fascist" threat to the country and democracy. Biden underscored the prevalence of authoritarian leaders who persist in oppressing the people's will. He contrasted them against "mainstream Republicans" whom he portrayed as less extreme. Alongside this, Biden expressed his support for both the Department of Justice's and the Federal Bureau of Investigation's investigation into Trump.

"Donald Trump and the MAGA Republicans represent an extremism that threatens the very foundations of our republic."

— Joseph R. Biden

Biden once more reminded the nation the power they hold, claiming that it is at an inflection point. Following this, he denounced the promotion of violence and enforced stricter gun laws, saying "It's never appropriate. Never." Even so, he emphasized that he condemns only those loyal to Trump, rather than every supporter of the preceding president. In a speech addressed to 2020 Trump voters, he quoted, "...weren't voting for attacking the Capitol, they weren't voting for overruling an election."

The speech was a contrast and turnaround from Biden's typical message of bipartisanship since the 2020 Presidential Election. To hecklers who interrupted the speech with the anti-Biden chant of "Let's Go Brandon", he responded, "Good manners is nothing they've ever suffered from".

== Reactions ==
The speech was noted for deviating from Biden's approach toward compromise and bipartisanship. An article in The Atlantic explains the rationale behind this alteration: "Biden's sharp speech has only one justification: So much of it is true. (…) Whatever was true four, five, or six years ago, in 2022 Trumpism cannot be regarded as some anomalous strain in U.S. politics. What began as deviation has become mainstream. (…) Facing that reality is the way to prevent it from doing worse harm. Only recognition of that unwelcome new reality can change behaviors across American politics — not just those of Trump supporters, but also those of Trump opponents."

Republicans largely criticized Biden's speech as divisive. On September 4 in a rally, Trump said it was "the most vicious, hateful, and divisive speech ever delivered by an American president." Then House Minority Leader Kevin McCarthy wrote on Twitter that, "President Biden has chosen to divide, demean, and disparage his fellow Americans — simply because they disagree with his policies." The Washington Post editorial board criticized Biden's speech for partisanship. The Associated Press noted that calling Trump out for attacks on democracy, "can be manipulated or framed as being partisan. And if you don't call it out, you are shrinking from an important challenge in the defense of democracy."

The prime time address was not televised by any of the Big Three American broadcasting networks. During some of the coverage, the camera framed the exterior brick of Independence Hall illuminated in red lighting, along with two uniformed Marines in the background. Some pundits applauded the overall tone, while The Guardian called it "dark", and New York Magazine said the speech prompted "numerous comparisons of Biden to Hitler and Satan".

== See also ==
- FBI search of Mar-a-Lago
- Indictments against Donald Trump
