= List of executive orders in the first Trump presidency =

United States presidents issue executive orders (in addition to other executive actions) to help officers and agencies of the executive branch manage the operations within the federal government itself.

Donald Trump signed a total of 220 executive orders during his first term, from January 2017 to January 2021. As of January 2025, 72 of them (33%) have been revoked, many by his successor, Joe Biden.

== 2017 ==
Relative no.	Absolute no.	Title / Description	Date signed	Date published	FR citation	FR doc. no.	Ref.	Revoked by – EO no.
1	13765	Minimizing the Economic Burden of the Patient Protection and Affordable Care Act Pending Repeal	January 20, 2017	January 24, 2017	82 FR 8351	2017–01799		14009
2	13766	Expediting Environmental Reviews and Approvals for High Priority Infrastructure Projects	January 24, 2017	January 30, 2017	82 FR 8657	2017–02029		13990
3	13767	Border Security and Immigration Enforcement Improvements	January 25, 2017	January 30, 2017	82 FR 8793	2017–02095		14010
4	13768	Enhancing Public Safety in the Interior of the United States (Note: On April 25, 2017, United States District Judge William Orrick III of the United States District Court for the Northern District of California ruled that Trump exceeded his presidential authority when he signed EO 13768 on January 25, 2017, directing his administration to withhold all federal funding from local jurisdictions deemed to be "sanctuary jurisdictions" including "sanctuary cities" by issuing a preliminary injunction. Judge Orrick subsequently issued a nationwide permanent injunction on November 20, 2017, declaring that section 9(a) of EO 13768 was "unconstitutional on its face" and violates "the separation of powers doctrine and deprives [the plaintiffs] of their Tenth and Fifth Amendment rights". With lawsuits brought by San Francisco and Santa Clara counties, Orrick ruled that the Trump administration cannot set new conditions on spending approved by Congress. Orrick said that the order was written broadly to "reach all federal grants" and potentially jeopardized hundreds of millions of dollars in funding to San Francisco and Santa Clara.)	January 25, 2017	January 30, 2017	82 FR 8799	2017–02102		13993
5	13769	Protecting the Nation From Foreign Terrorist Entry Into the United States	January 27, 2017	February 1, 2017	82 FR 8977	2017–02281		13780
6	13770	Ethics Commitments by Executive Branch Appointees (Note: Supersedes: EO 13490 of January 21, 2009.)	January 28, 2017	February 3, 2017	82 FR 9333	2017–02450		13983
7	13771	Reducing Regulation and Controlling Regulatory Costs	January 30, 2017	February 3, 2017	82 FR 9339	2017–02451		13992
8	13772	Core Principles for Regulating the United States Financial System	February 3, 2017	February 8, 2017	82 FR 9965	2017–02762		14018
9	13773	Enforcing Federal Law With Respect to Transnational Criminal Organizations and Preventing International Trafficking	February 9, 2017	February 14, 2017	82 FR 10691	2017–03113		(Note: Section 3 revoked by EO 14060 of December 15, 2021.)
10	13774	Preventing Violence Against Federal, State, Tribal, and Local Law Enforcement Officers	February 9, 2017	February 14, 2017	82 FR 10695	2017–03115		
11	13775	Providing an Order of Succession Within the Department of Justice (Note: Revokes: EO 13762 of January 13, 2017.)	February 9, 2017	February 14, 2017	82 FR 10697	2017–03116		13787
12	13776	Task Force on Crime Reduction and Public Safety	February 9, 2017	February 14, 2017	82 FR 10699	2017–03118		
13	13777	Enforcing the Regulatory Reform Agenda	February 24, 2017	March 1, 2017	82 FR 12285	2017–04107		13992
14	13778	Restoring the Rule of Law, Federalism, and Economic Growth by Reviewing the "Waters of the United States" Rule	February 28, 2017	March 3, 2017	82 FR 12497	2017–04353		13990
15	13779	The White House Initiative to Promote Excellence and Innovation at Historically Black Colleges and Universities (Note: Revokes: EO 13532 of February 26, 2010.)	February 28, 2017	March 3, 2017	82 FR 12499	2017–04357		14041
16	13780	Protecting the Nation From Foreign Terrorist Entry Into the United States (Note: Revokes: EO 13769 of January 27, 2017. Supplemented by Proclamation 9645 of September 24, 2017.) (Note: On March 15, 2017, Judge Derrick Watson of the United States District Court for the District of Hawaii issued a temporary restraining order enjoining the government from enforcing several key provisions of the order (sections 2 and 6). The judge claimed the executive order was likely motivated by anti-Muslim sentiment and thus breached the Establishment Clause of the United States Constitution. On the same date, Judge Theodore Chuang of the United States District Court for the District of Maryland reached a similar conclusion (enjoining section 2(c) only). The Department of Justice stated that it "will continue to defend [the] Executive Order in the courts". Shortly following arguments from the state of Hawaii and the Department of Justice, the restraining order was converted by Watson into an indefinite preliminary injunction on March 29. On May 25, 2017, the United States Court of Appeals for the Fourth Circuit in Richmond, Virginia, refused to reinstate the ban, citing religious discrimination. On June 1, 2017, the Trump administration appealed to the U.S. Supreme Court for the cancellation of the preliminary injunctions and to allow the order to go into effect while the court looks at its ultimate legality later in the year. On June 26, 2017, the Supreme Court partially lifted the halt and would hear oral arguments for the petition to vacate the injunctions later in the year. On October 17, 2017, Watson issued another temporary restraining order that was asked by the state of Hawaii. Watson's decision stated that the latest ban "suffers from precisely the same maladies as its predecessor" as it "plainly discriminates based on nationality" and as such violates federal law and "the founding principles of this Nation". In June 2018, the Supreme Court upheld the third travel ban.)	March 6, 2017	March 9, 2017	82 FR 13209	2017–04837		Proclamation 10141
17	13781	Comprehensive Plan for Reorganizing the Executive Branch	March 13, 2017	March 16, 2017	82 FR 13959	2017–05399		
18	13782	Revocation of Federal Contracting Executive Orders (Note: Revokes: EO 13673 of July 31, 2014, section 3 of EO 13683 of December 11, 2014, and EO 13738 of August 23, 2016.)	March 27, 2017	March 30, 2017	82 FR 15607	2017–06382		
19	13783	Promoting Energy Independence and Economic Growth (Note: Revokes: EO 13653 of November 1, 2013.)	March 28, 2017	March 31, 2017	82 FR 16093	2017–06576		13990
20	13784	Establishing the President's Commission on Combating Drug Addiction and the Opioid Crisis	March 29, 2017	April 3, 2017	82 FR 16283	2017–06716		
21	13785	Establishing the Enhanced Collection and Enforcement of Antidumping and Countervailing Duties and Violations of Trade and Customs Laws	March 31, 2017	April 5, 2017	82 FR 16719	2017–06967		
22	13786	Regarding the Omnibus Report on Significant Trade Deficits	March 31, 2017	April 5, 2017	82 FR 16721	2017–06968		
23	13787	Providing an Order of Succession Within the Department of Justice (Note: Revokes: EO 13775 of February 9, 2017.)	March 31, 2017	April 5, 2017	82 FR 16723	2017–06971		14136
24	13788	Buy American and Hire American (Note: Amended by: EO 13858 of January 31, 2019.)	April 18, 2017	April 21, 2017	82 FR 18837	2017–08311		14005
25	13789	Identifying and Reducing Tax Regulatory Burdens	April 21, 2017	April 26, 2017	82 FR 19317	2017–08586		
26	13790	Promoting Agriculture and Rural Prosperity in America (Note: Revokes: EO 13575 (Establishment of the White House Rural Council) of June 9, 2011.)	April 25, 2017	April 28, 2017	82 FR 20237	2017–08818		
27	13791	Enforcing Statutory Prohibitions on Federal Control of Education	April 26, 2017	May 1, 2017	82 FR 20427	2017–08905		
28	13792	Review of Designations Under the Antiquities Act	April 26, 2017	May 1, 2017	82 FR 20429	2017–08908		13990
29	13793	Improving Accountability and Whistleblower Protection at the Department of Veterans Affairs	April 27, 2017	May 2, 2017	82 FR 20539	2017–08990		
30	13794	Establishment of the American Technology Council	April 28, 2017	May 3, 2017	82 FR 20811	2017–09087		
31	13795	Implementing an America-First Offshore Energy Strategy (Note: Revokes: EO 13754 of December 9, 2016.)	April 28, 2017	May 3, 2017	82 FR 20815	2017–09083		13990
32	13796	Addressing Trade Agreement Violations and Abuses	April 29, 2017	May 4, 2017	82 FR 20819	2017–09156		
33	13797	Establishment of the Office of Trade and Manufacturing Policy	April 29, 2017	May 4, 2017	82 FR 20821	2017–09161		
34	13798	Promoting Free Speech and Religious Liberty	May 4, 2017	May 9, 2017	82 FR 21675	2017–09574		
35	13799	Establishment of the Presidential Advisory Commission on Election Integrity	May 11, 2017	May 16, 2017	82 FR 22389	2017–10003		13820
36	13800	Strengthening the Cybersecurity of Federal Networks and Critical Infrastructure	May 11, 2017	May 16, 2017	82 FR 22391	2017–10004		
37	13801	Expanding Apprenticeships in America	June 15, 2017	June 20, 2017	82 FR 28229	2017–13012		14016
38	13802	Amending Executive Order 13597 (Note: Amends: EO 13597 of January 19, 2012.)	June 21, 2017	June 26, 2017	82 FR 28747	2017–13458		
39	13803	Revival of the National Space Council (Note: Supersedes: EO 12675 of April 20, 1989.)	June 30, 2017	July 7, 2017	82 FR 31429	2017–14378		14056
40	13804	Allowing Additional Time for Recognizing Positive Actions by the Government of Sudan and Amending Executive Order 13761 (Note: Amends: EO 13761 of January 13, 2017.)	July 11, 2017	July 14, 2017	82 FR 32611	2017–14992		
41	13805	Establishing a Presidential Advisory Council on Infrastructure	July 19, 2017	July 25, 2017	82 FR 34383	2017–15680		13811
42	13806	Assessing and Strengthening the Manufacturing and Defense Industrial Base and Supply Chain Resiliency of the United States	July 21, 2017	July 26, 2017	82 FR 34597	2017–15860		
43	13807	Establishing Discipline and Accountability in the Environmental Review and Permitting Process for Infrastructure Projects (Note: Revokes: EO 13690 of January 30, 2015.)	August 15, 2017	August 24, 2017	82 FR 40463	2017–18134		13990
44	13808	Imposing Sanctions With Respect to the Situation in Venezuela	August 25, 2017	August 29, 2017	82 FR 41155	2017–18468		
45	13809	Restoring State, Tribal, and Local Law Enforcement's Access to Life-Saving Equipment and Resources (Note: Revokes: EO 13688 of January 16, 2015.)	August 28, 2017	August 31, 2017	82 FR 41499	2017–18679		14074
46	13810	Imposing Additional Sanctions With Respect to North Korea	September 20, 2017	September 25, 2017	82 FR 44705	2017–20647		
47	13811	Continuance of Certain Federal Advisory Committees (Note: Supersedes: EO 13708 of September 30, 2015. Revokes: EO 13805 of July 19, 2017.)	September 29, 2017	October 4, 2017	82 FR 46363	2017–21555		
48	13812	Revocation of Executive Order Creating Labor-Management Forums (Note: Revokes: EO 13522 of December 9, 2009.)	September 29, 2017	October 4, 2017	82 FR 46367	2017–21559		14119
49	13813	Promoting Healthcare Choice and Competition Across the United States	October 12, 2017	October 17, 2017	82 FR 48385	2017–22677		14009
50	13814	Amending Executive Order 13223 (Note: Amends: EO 13223 of September 14, 2001.)	October 20, 2017	October 24, 2017	82 FR 49273	2017–23270		
51	13815	Resuming the United States Refugee Admissions Program With Enhanced Vetting Capabilities	October 24, 2017	October 27, 2017	82 FR 50055	2017–23630		14013
52	13816	Revising the Seal for the National Credit Union Administration (Note: Revokes: EO 11580 of January 20, 1971.)	December 8, 2017	December 13, 2017	82 FR 58701	2017–27034		
53	13817	A Federal Strategy To Ensure Secure and Reliable Supplies of Critical Minerals (Note: Amended by: EO 13953 of September 30, 2020.)	December 20, 2017	December 26, 2017	82 FR 60835	2017–27899		
54	13818	Blocking the Property of Persons Involved in Serious Human Rights Abuse or Corruption	December 21, 2017	December 26, 2017	82 FR 60839	2017–27925		
55	13819	Adjustments of Certain Rates of Pay (Note: Supersedes: EO 13756 of December 27, 2016.)	December 22, 2017	December 27, 2017	82 FR 61431	2017–28160		(Note: Superseded by EO 13856 of December 28, 2018.)

== 2018 ==
Relative no.	Absolute no.	Title / Description	Date signed	Date published	FR citation	FR doc. no.	Ref.	Revoked by – EO no.
56	13820	Termination of Presidential Advisory Commission on Election Integrity (Note: Revokes: EO 13799 of May 11, 2017.)	January 3, 2018	January 8, 2018	83 FR 969	2018–00240		
57	13821	Streamlining and Expediting Requests to Locate Broadband Facilities in Rural America	January 8, 2018	January 11, 2018	83 FR 1507	2018–00553		
58	13822	Supporting Our Veterans During Their Transition From Uniformed Service to Civilian Life	January 9, 2018	January 12, 2018	83 FR 1513	2018–00630		
59	13823	Protecting America Through Lawful Detention of Terrorists (Note: Revokes: EO 13492 of January 22, 2009.)	January 30, 2018	February 2, 2018	83 FR 4831	2018–02261		
60	13824	President's Council on Sports, Fitness, and Nutrition (Note: Amends: EO 13265 of June 6, 2002. Revokes: EO 13545 of June 22, 2010.)	February 26, 2018	March 2, 2018	83 FR 8923	2018–04414		
61	13825	2018 Amendments to the Manual for Courts-Martial, United States	March 1, 2018	March 8, 2018	83 FR 9889	2018–04860		
62	13826	Federal Interagency Council on Crime Prevention and Improving Reentry	March 7, 2018	March 12, 2018	83 FR 10771	2018–05113		
63	13827	Taking Additional Steps to Address the Situation in Venezuela	March 19, 2018	March 21, 2018	83 FR 12469	2018–05916		
64	13828	Reducing Poverty in America by Promoting Opportunity and Economic Mobility	April 10, 2018	April 13, 2018	83 FR 15941	2018–07874		14018
65	13829	Task Force on the United States Postal System	April 12, 2018	April 18, 2018	83 FR 17281	2018–08272		
66	13830	Delegation of Authority To Approve Certain Military Decorations (Note: Supersedes: EO 4601 of March 1, 1927, and EO 9260 of October 29, 1942. Amended by: EO 14085 of October 3, 2022.)	April 20, 2018	April 25, 2018	83 FR 18191	2018–08883		
67	13831	Establishment of a White House Faith and Opportunity Initiative (Note: Amends: EO 13198 of January 29, 2001, EO 13280 of December 12, 2002, EO 13342 of June 1, 2004, EO 13397 of March 7, 2006, and EO 13359 of November 17, 2010. Revokes: EO 13199 of January 29, 2001, and EO 13498 of February 5, 2009.)	May 3, 2018	May 8, 2018	83 FR 20715	2018–09895		14015
68	13832	Enhancing Noncompetitive Civil Service Appointments of Military Spouses	May 9, 2018	May 14, 2018	83 FR 22343	2018–10403		
69	13833	Enhancing the Effectiveness of Agency Chief Information Officers	May 15, 2018	May 18, 2018	83 FR 23345	2018–10855		
70	13834	Efficient Federal Operations (Note: Revokes: EO 13693 of March 19, 2015.)	May 17, 2018	May 22, 2018	83 FR 23771	2018–11101		14057 (Note: EO 13990 of January 20, 2021, revoked EO 13834 except for sections 6, 7, and 11. The remainder was revoked by EO 14057.)
71	13835	Prohibiting Certain Additional Transactions With Respect to Venezuela	May 21, 2018	May 24, 2018	83 FR 24001	2018–11335		
72	13836	Developing Efficient, Effective, and Cost-Reducing Approaches To Federal Sector Collective Bargaining	May 25, 2018	June 1, 2018	83 FR 25329	2018–11913		14003
73	13837	Ensuring Transparency, Accountability, and Efficiency in Taxpayer-Funded Union Time Use	May 25, 2018	June 1, 2018	83 FR 25335	2018–11916		14003
74	13838	Exemption From Executive Order 13658 for Recreational Services on Federal Lands (Note: Amends: EO 13658 of February 12, 2014.)	May 25, 2018	June 1, 2018	83 FR 25341	2018–11936		14026
75	13839	Promoting Accountability and Streamlining Removal Procedures Consistent With Merit System Principles	May 25, 2018	June 1, 2018	83 FR 25343	2018–11939		14003
76	13840	Ocean Policy to Advance the Economic, Security, and Environmental Interests of the United States	June 19, 2018	June 22, 2018	83 FR 29431	2018–13640		
77	13841	Affording Congress an Opportunity to Address Family Separation	June 20, 2018	June 25, 2018	83 FR 29435	2018–13696		14011
78	13842	Establishing an Exception to Competitive Examining Rules for Appointment to Certain Positions in the United States Marshals Service, Department of Justice	July 10, 2018	July 13, 2018	83 FR 32753	2018–15195		
79	13843	Excepting Administrative Law Judges From the Competitive Service	July 10, 2018	July 13, 2018	83 FR 32755	2018–15202		
80	13844	Establishment of the Task Force on Market Integrity and Consumer Fraud (Note: Revokes: EO 13519 of November 17, 2009.)	July 11, 2018	July 16, 2018	83 FR 33115	2018–15299		
81	13845	Establishing the President's National Council for the American Worker (Note: Amended by: EO 13853 of December 12, 2018.)	July 19, 2018	July 24, 2018	83 FR 35099	2018–15955		14025
82	13846	Reimposing Certain Sanctions With Respect to Iran (Note: Supersedes: EO 13628 of October 9, 2012, and EO 13716 of January 16, 2016.)	August 6, 2018	August 7, 2018	83 FR 38939	2018–17068		
83	13847	Strengthening Retirement Security in America	August 31, 2018	September 6, 2018	83 FR 45321	2018–19514		
84	13848	Imposing Certain Sanctions in the Event of Foreign Interference in a United States Election	September 12, 2018	September 14, 2018	83 FR 46843	2018–20203		
85	13849	Authorizing the Implementation of Certain Sanctions Set Forth in the Countering America's Adversaries Through Sanctions Act	September 20, 2018	September 21, 2018	83 FR 48195	2018–20816		
86	13850	Blocking Property of Additional Persons Contributing to the Situation in Venezuela	November 1, 2018	November 2, 2018	83 FR 55243	2018–24254		
87	13851	Blocking Property of Certain Persons Contributing to the Situation in Nicaragua (Note: Amended by: EO 14088 of October 24, 2022.)	November 27, 2018	November 9, 2018	83 FR 61505	2018–26156		
88	13852	Providing for the Closing of Executive Departments and Agencies of the Federal Government on December 5, 2018	December 1, 2018	December 4, 2018	83 FR 62687	2018–26552		
89	13853	Establishing the White House Opportunity and Revitalization Council (Note: Amends: EO 13845 of July 19, 2018.)	December 12, 2018	December 18, 2018	83 FR 65071	2018–27515		14091
90	13854	Providing for the Closing of Executive Departments and Agencies of the Federal Government on December 24, 2018	December 18, 2018	December 21, 2018	83 FR 65481	2018–27945		
91	13855	Promoting Active Management of America's Forests, Rangelands, and Other Federal Lands To Improve Conditions and Reduce Wildfire Risk	December 21, 2018	January 7, 2019	84 FR 45	2019–00014		
92	13856	Adjustments of Certain Rates of Pay (Note: Supersedes: EO 13819 of December 22, 2017.)	December 28, 2018	January 8, 2019	84 FR 65	2019–00048		(Note: Superseded by EO 13866 of March 28, 2019.)

== 2019 ==
Relative no.	Absolute no.	Title / Description	Date signed	Date published	FR citation	FR doc. no.	Ref.	Revoked by – EO no.
93	13857	Taking Additional Steps To Address the National Emergency With Respect to Venezuela	January 28, 2019	January 30, 2019	84 FR 509	2019–00615		
94	13858	Strengthening Buy-American Preferences for Infrastructure Projects (Note: Amends: EO 13788 of April 18, 2017.)	January 31, 2019	February 5, 2019	84 FR 2039	2019–01426		(Note: Section 5 revoked by EO 14005 of January 25, 2021.)
95	13859	Maintaining American Leadership in Artificial Intelligence	February 11, 2019	February 14, 2019	84 FR 3967	2019–02544		
96	13860	Supporting the Transition of Active Duty Service Members and Military Veterans into the Merchant Marine	March 4, 2019	March 7, 2019	84 FR 8407	2019–04298		
97	13861	National Roadmap to Empower Veterans and End Suicide	March 5, 2019	March 8, 2019	84 FR 8585	2019–04437		
98	13862	Revocation of Reporting Requirement (Note: Revokes: section 3 of EO 13732 of July 1, 2016.)	March 6, 2019	March 11, 2019	84 FR 8789	2019–04595		
99	13863	Taking Additional Steps to Address the National Emergency With Respect to Significant Transnational Criminal Organizations (Note: Amends: EO 13581 of July 24, 2011.)	March 15, 2019	March 19, 2019	84 FR 10255	2019–05370		
100	13864	Improving Free Inquiry, Transparency, and Accountability at Colleges and Universities	March 21, 2019	March 26, 2019	84 FR 11401	2019–05934		
101	13865	Coordinating National Resilience to Electromagnetic Pulses	March 26, 2019	March 29, 2019	84 FR 12041	2019–06325		
102	13866	Adjustments of Certain Rates of Pay (Note: Supersedes: EO 13856 of December 28, 2018.)	March 28, 2019	April 2, 2019	84 FR 12853	2019–06548		(Note: Superseded by EO 13901 of December 26, 2019.)
103	13867	Issuance of Permits With Respect to Facilities and Land Transportation Crossings at the International Boundaries of the United States (Note: Revokes: EO 11423 of August 16, 1968, and EO 13337 of April 30, 2004.)	April 10, 2019	April 15, 2019	84 FR 15491	2019–07645		
104	13868	Promoting Energy Infrastructure and Economic Growth	April 10, 2019	April 15, 2019	84 FR 15495	2019–07656		13990
105	13869	Transferring Responsibility for Background Investigations to the Department of Defense (Note: Amends: EO 12171 of November 18, 1979, and EO 13467 of June 30, 2008.)	April 24, 2019	April 29, 2019	84 FR 18125	2019–08797		
106	13870	America's Cybersecurity Workforce	May 2, 2019	May 9, 2019	84 FR 20523	2019–09750		
107	13871	Imposing Sanctions With Respect to the Iron, Steel, Aluminum, and Copper Sectors of Iran	May 8, 2019	May 10, 2019	84 FR 20761	2019–09877		
108	13872	Economic Empowerment of Asian Americans and Pacific Islanders (Note: Supersedes: EO 13515 of October 14, 2009, and section 1(s) of EO 13811 of September 29, 2017.)	May 13, 2019	May 16, 2019	84 FR 22321	2019–10398		(Note: Superseded by EO 14031 of May 28, 2021.)
109	13873	Securing the Information and Communications Technology and Services Supply Chain (Note: Amended by: EO 14117 of February 28, 2024.)	May 15, 2019	May 17, 2019	84 FR 22689	2019–10538		
110	13874	Modernizing the Regulatory Framework for Agricultural Biotechnology Products	June 11, 2019	June 14, 2019	84 FR 27899	2019–12802		
111	13875	Evaluating and Improving the Utility of Federal Advisory Committees	June 14, 2019	June 19, 2019	84 FR 28711	2019–13175		13992
112	13876	Imposing Sanctions With Respect to Iran	June 24, 2019	June 26, 2019	84 FR 30573	2019–13793		
113	13877	Improving Price and Quality Transparency in American Healthcare To Put Patients First	June 24, 2019	June 27, 2019	84 FR 30849	2019–13945		
114	13878	Establishing a White House Council on Eliminating Regulatory Barriers to Affordable Housing	June 25, 2019	June 28, 2019	84 FR 30853	2019–14016		
115	13879	Advancing American Kidney Health	July 10, 2019	July 15, 2019	84 FR 33817	2019–15159		
116	13880	Collecting Information About Citizenship Status in Connection With the Decennial Census	July 11, 2019	July 16, 2019	84 FR 33821	2019–15222		13986
117	13881	Maximizing Use of American-Made Goods, Products, and Materials (Note: Revokes: EO 10582 of December 17, 1954.)	July 15, 2019	July 18, 2019	84 FR 34257	2019–15449		(Note: Superseded by EO 14005 of January 25, 2021.)
118	13882	Blocking Property and Suspending Entry of Certain Persons Contributing to the Situation in Mali	July 26, 2019	July 30, 2019	84 FR 37055	2019–16383		
119	13883	Administration of Proliferation Sanctions and Amendment of Executive Order 12851 (Note: Amends: EO 12851 of June 11, 1993.)	August 1, 2019	August 5, 2019	84 FR 38113	2019–16879		
120	13884	Blocking Property of the Government of Venezuela	August 5, 2019	August 7, 2019	84 FR 38843	2019–17052		
121	13885	Establishing the National Quantum Initiative Advisory Committee	August 30, 2019	September 5, 2019	84 FR 46873	2019–19367		14073
122	13886	Modernizing Sanctions To Combat Terrorism (Note: Revokes: EO 12947 of January 23, 1995. Amends: EO 13224 of September 23, 2001.)	September 9, 2019	September 12, 2019	84 FR 48041	2019–19895		
123	13887	Modernizing Influenza Vaccines in the United States to Promote National Security and Public Health	September 19, 2019	September 24, 2019	84 FR 49935	2019–20804		
124	13888	Enhancing State and Local Involvement in Refugee Resettlement	September 26, 2019	October 1, 2019	84 FR 52355	2019–21505		14013
125	13889	Continuance of Certain Federal Advisory Committees (Note: Supersedes: sections 1 and 2 of EO 13811 of September 29, 2017.)	September 27, 2019	October 2, 2019	84 FR 52743	2019–21630		(Note: Section 1(u) superseded by EO 13935. Sections 1 and 2 superseded by EO 14048 of September 30, 2021.)
126	13890	Protecting and Improving Medicare for Our Nation's Seniors	October 3, 2019	October 8, 2019	84 FR 53573	2019–22073		
127	13891	Promoting the Rule of Law Through Improved Agency Guidance Documents	October 9, 2019	October 15, 2019	84 FR 55235	2019–22623		13992
128	13892	Promoting the Rule of Law Through Transparency and Fairness in Civil Administrative Enforcement and Adjudication	October 9, 2019	October 15, 2019	84 FR 55239	2019–22624		13992
129	13893	Increasing Government Accountability for Administrative Actions by Reinvigorating Administrative PAYGO	October 10, 2019	October 16, 2019	84 FR 55487	2019–22749		13992
130	13894	Blocking Property and Suspending Entry of Certain Persons Contributing to the Situation in Syria (Note: Amended by: EO 14142 of January 15, 2025.)	October 14, 2019	October 17, 2019	84 FR 55851	2019–22849		
131	13895	President's Council of Advisors on Science and Technology (Note: Revokes: EO 13539 of April 21, 2010.)	October 22, 2019	October 25, 2019	84 FR 57309	2019–23525		14007
132	13896	Commission on Law Enforcement and the Administration of Justice	October 28, 2019	November 1, 2019	84 FR 58595	2019–24040		
133	13897	Improving Federal Contractor Operations by Revoking Executive Order 13495 (Note: Revokes: EO 13495 of January 30, 2009.)	October 31, 2019	November 5, 2019	84 FR 59709	2019–24288		14055 (Note: EO 13897 revoked EO 13495 of January 30, 2009. EO 14055 revoked EO 13897, but EO 13495 remains revoked.)
134	13898	Establishing the Task Force on Missing and Murdered American Indians and Alaska Natives	November 26, 2019	December 2, 2019	84 FR 66059	2019–26178		
135	13899	Combating Anti-Semitism	December 11, 2019	December 16, 2019	84 FR 68779	2019–27217		
136	13900	Providing for the Closing of Executive Departments and Agencies of the Federal Government on December 24, 2019	December 17, 2019	December 20, 2019	84 FR 69983	2019–27678		
137	13901	Adjustments of Certain Rates of Pay (Note: Supersedes: EO 13866 of March 28, 2019.)	December 26, 2019	December 30, 2019	84 FR 72213	2019–28286		(Note: Superseded by EO 13970 of December 31, 2020.)

== 2020 ==
Relative no.	Absolute no.	Title / Description	Date signed	Date published	FR citation	FR doc. no.	Ref.	Revoked by – EO no.
138	13902	Imposing Sanctions with Respect to Additional Sectors of Iran	January 10, 2020	January 14, 2020	85 FR 2003	2020–00534		
139	13903	Combating Human Trafficking and Online Child Exploitation in the United States	January 31, 2020	February 5, 2020	85 FR 6721	2020–02438		
140	13904	Ensuring Safe and Lawful E-Commerce for United States Consumers, Businesses, Government Supply Chains, and Intellectual Property Rights	January 31, 2020	February 5, 2020	85 FR 6725	2020–02439		
141	13905	Strengthening National Resilience Through Responsible Use of Positioning, Navigation, and Timing Services	February 12, 2020	February 18, 2020	85 FR 9359	2020–03337		
142	13906	Amending Executive Order 13803—Reviving the National Space Council (Note: Amends: EO 13803 of June 30, 2017.)	February 13, 2020	February 20, 2020	85 FR 10031	2020–03556		14056
143	13907	Establishment of the Interagency Environment Committee for Monitoring and Enforcement Under Section 811 of the United States-Mexico-Canada Agreement Implementation Act	February 28, 2020	March 6, 2020	85 FR 12977	2020–04730		
144	13908	Establishment of the Interagency Committee on Trade in Automotive Goods Under Section 202A of the United States Mexico Canada Agreement Implementation Act	February 28, 2020	March 6, 2020	85 FR 12983	2020–04755		
145	13909	Prioritizing and Allocating Health and Medical Resources to Respond to the Spread of COVID-19	March 18, 2020	March 23, 2020	85 FR 16227	2020–06161		
146	13910	Preventing Hoarding of Health and Medical Resources To Respond to the Spread of COVID-19	March 23, 2020	March 26, 2020	85 FR 17001	2020–06478		14122
147	13911	Delegating Additional Authority Under the Defense Production Act With Respect to Health and Medical Resources To Respond to the Spread of COVID-19	March 27, 2020	April 1, 2020	85 FR 18403	2020–06969		
148	13912	National Emergency Authority To Order the Selected Reserve and Certain Members of the Individual Ready Reserve of the Armed Forces to Active Duty	March 27, 2020	April 1, 2020	85 FR 18407	2020–06985		
149	13913	Establishing the Committee for the Assessment of Foreign Participation in the United States Telecommunications Services Sector	April 4, 2020	April 8, 2020	85 FR 19643	2020–07530		
150	13914	Encouraging International Support for the Recovery and Use of Space Resources	April 6, 2020	April 10, 2020	85 FR 20381	2020–07800		
151	13915	Providing an Order of Succession Within the Department of the Interior (Note: Revokes: EO 13244 of December 18, 2001.)	April 14, 2020	April 17, 2020	85 FR 21733	2020–08392		
152	13916	National Emergency Authority To Temporarily Extend Deadlines for Certain Estimated Payments	April 18, 2020	April 23, 2020	85 FR 22951	2020–08846		
153	13917	Delegating Authority Under the Defense Production Act With Respect to Food Supply Chain Resources During the National Emergency Caused by the Outbreak of COVID- 19	April 28, 2020	May 1, 2020	85 FR 26313	2020–09536		
154	13918	Establishment of the Interagency Labor Committee for Monitoring and Enforcement Under Section 711 of the United States-Mexico-Canada Agreement Implementation Act	April 28, 2020	May 1, 2020	85 FR 26315	2020–09537		
155	13919	Ordering the Selected Reserve of the Armed Forces to Active Duty	April 30, 2020	May 4, 2020	85 FR 26591	2020–09645		
156	13920	Securing the United States Bulk-Power System	May 1, 2020	May 4, 2020	85 FR 26595	2020–09695		
157	13921	Promoting American Seafood Competitiveness and Economic Growth	May 7, 2020	May 12, 2020	85 FR 28471	2020–10315		
158	13922	Delegating Authority Under the Defense Production Act to the chief executive officer of the United States International Development Finance Corporation To Respond to the COVID-19 Outbreak	May 14, 2020	May 19, 2020	85 FR 30583	2020–10953		
159	13923	Establishment of the Forced Labor Enforcement Task Force Under Section 741 of the United States- Mexico-Canada Agreement Implementation Act	May 15, 2020	May 20, 2020	85 FR 30587	2020–10993		
160	13924	Regulatory Relief To Support Economic Recovery	May 19, 2020	May 22, 2020	85 FR 31353	2020–11301		14018
161	13925	Preventing Online Censorship	May 28, 2020	June 2, 2020	85 FR 34079	2020–12030		14029
162	13926	Advancing International Religious Freedom	June 2, 2020	June 5, 2020	85 FR 34951	2020–12430		
163	13927	Accelerating the Nation's Economic Recovery From the COVID-19 Emergency by Expediting Infrastructure Investments and Other Activities	June 4, 2020	June 9, 2020	85 FR 35165	2020–12584		13990
164	13928	Blocking Property of Certain Persons Associated With the International Criminal Court	June 11, 2020	June 15, 2020	85 FR 36139	2020–12953		14022
165	13929	Safe Policing for Safe Communities	June 16, 2020	June 19, 2020	85 FR 37325	2020–13449		14074
166	13930	Strengthening the Child Welfare System for America's Children	June 24, 2020	June 29, 2020	85 FR 38741	2020–14077		
167	13931	Continuing the President's National Council for the American Worker and the American Workforce Policy Advisory Board	June 26, 2020	July 1, 2020	85 FR 39455	2020–14328		14025
168	13932	Modernizing and Reforming the Assessment and Hiring of Federal Job Candidates	June 26, 2020	July 1, 2020	85 FR 39457	2020–14337		
169	13933	Protecting American Monuments, Memorials, and Statues and Combating Recent Criminal Violence	June 26, 2020	July 2, 2020	85 FR 40081	2020–14509		14029
170	13934	Building and Rebuilding Monuments to American Heroes (Note: Amended by: EO 13978 of January 18, 2021.)	July 3, 2020	July 8, 2020	85 FR 41165	2020–14872		14029
171	13935	White House Hispanic Prosperity Initiative (Note: Supersedes: EO 13555 of October 19, 2010, and section 1(u) of EO 13889 of September 27, 2019.)	July 9, 2020	July 14, 2020	85 FR 42683	2020–15338		14045
172	13936	The President's Executive Order on Hong Kong Normalization	July 14, 2020	July 17, 2020	85 FR 43413	2020–15646		
173	13937	Access to Affordable Life-saving Medications	July 24, 2020	July 29, 2020	85 FR 45755	2020–16623		
174	13938	Increasing Drug Importation to Lower Prices for American Patients	July 24, 2020	July 29, 2020	85 FR 45757	2020–16624		
175	13930	Lowering Prices for Patients by Eliminating Kickbacks to Middlemen	July 24, 2020	July 29, 2020	85 FR 45759	2020–16625		
176	13940	Aligning Federal Contracting and Hiring Practices With the Interests of American Workers	August 3, 2020	August 6, 2020	85 FR 47879	2020–17363		
177	13941	Improving Rural Health and Telehealth Access	August 3, 2020	August 6, 2020	85 FR 47881	2020–17364		
178	13942	Addressing the Threat Posed by TikTok, and Taking Additional Steps To Address the National Emergency With Respect to the Information and Communications Technology and Services Supply Chain	August 6, 2020	August 11, 2020	85 FR 48637	2020–17699		14034
179	13943	Addressing the Threat Posed by WeChat, and Taking Additional Steps To Address the National Emergency With Respect to the Information and Communications Technology and Services Supply Chain	August 6, 2020	August 11, 2020	85 FR 48641	2020–17700		14034
180	13944	Combating Public Health Emergencies and Strengthening National Security by Ensuring Essential Medicines, Medical Countermeasures, and Critical Inputs Are Made in the United States	August 6, 2020	August 14, 2020	85 FR 49929	2020–18012		
181	13945	Fighting the Spread of COVID-19 by Providing Assistance to Renters and Homeowners	August 8, 2020	August 14, 2020	85 FR 49935	2020–18015		
182	13946	Targeting Opportunity Zones and Other Distressed Communities for Federal Site Locations (Note: Amends: EO 12072 of August 16, 1978, and EO 13006 of May 21, 1996.)	August 24, 2020	August 27, 2020	85 FR 52879	2020–19032		14091
183	13947	Increasing Drug Importation to Lower Prices for American Patients	July 24, 2020	September 18, 2020	85 FR 59171	2020–20887		
184	13948	Lowering Drug Prices by Putting America First	September 13, 2020	September 23, 2020	85 FR 59649	2020–21129		
185	13949	Blocking Property of Certain Persons With Respect to the Conventional Arms Activities of Iran	September 21, 2020	September 23, 2020	85 FR 60043	2020–21160		
186	13950	Combating Race and Sex Stereotyping	September 22, 2020	September 28, 2020	85 FR 60683	2020–21534		13985
187	13951	An America-First Healthcare Plan	September 24, 2020	October 1, 2020	85 FR 62179	2020–21914		
188	13952	Protecting Vulnerable Newborn and Infant Children	September 25, 2020	October 2, 2020	85 FR 62187	2020–21960		
189	13953	Addressing the Threat to the Domestic Supply Chain From Reliance on Critical Minerals From Foreign Adversaries and Supporting the Domestic Mining and Processing Industries (Note: Amends: EO 13817 of December 20, 2017.)	September 30, 2020	October 5, 2020	85 FR 62539	2020–22064		
190	13954	Saving Lives Through Increased Support for Mental- and Behavioral-Health Needs	October 3, 2020	October 8, 2020	85 FR 63977	2020–22510		
191	13955	Establishing the One Trillion Trees Interagency Council	October 13, 2020	October 16, 2020	85 FR 65643	2020–23115		
192	13956	Modernizing America's Water Resource Management and Water Infrastructure	October 13, 2020	October 16, 2020	85 FR 65647	2020–23116		
193	13957	Creating Schedule F in the Excepted Service	October 21, 2020	October 26, 2020	85 FR 67631	2020–23780		14003
194	13958	Establishing the President's Advisory 1776 Commission	November 2, 2020	November 5, 2020	85 FR 70951	2020–24793		13985
195	13959	Addressing the Threat From Securities Investments That Finance Communist Chinese Military Companies (Note: Amended by: EO 13974 of January 13, 2021, and EO 14032 of June 3, 2021.)	November 12, 2020	November 17, 2020	85 FR 73185	2020–25459		(Note: Partially superseded by EO 14032 of June 3, 2021.)
196	13960	Promoting the Use of Trustworthy Artificial Intelligence in the Federal Government	December 3, 2020	December 8, 2020	85 FR 78939	2020–27065		
197	13961	Governance and Integration of Federal Mission Resilience (Note: Amends: EO 13618 of July 6, 2012. Amended by: EO 14146 of January 19, 2025.)	December 7, 2020	December 10, 2020	85 FR 79379	2020–27353		(Note: Sections 1, 3, 4, 5, and 7 revoked by EO 14146.)
198	13962	Ensuring Access to United States Government COVID-19 Vaccines	December 8, 2020	December 11, 2020	85 FR 79777	2020–27455		
199	13963	Providing an Order of Succession within the Department of Defense	December 10, 2020	December 15, 2020	85 FR 81331	2020–27739		
200	13964	Rebranding United States Foreign Assistance to Advance American Influence	December 10, 2020	December 15, 2020	85 FR 81333	2020–27740		14029
201	13965	Providing for the Closing of Executive Departments and Agencies of the Federal Government on December 24, 2020	December 11, 2020	December 16, 2020	85 FR 81337	2020–27807		
202	13966	Increasing Economic and Geographic Mobility	December 14, 2020	December 17, 2020	85 FR 81777	2020–27948		
203	13967	Promoting Beautiful Federal Civic Architecture	December 18, 2020	December 23, 2020	85 FR 83739	2020–28605		14018
204	13968	Promoting Redemption of Savings Bonds	December 18, 2020	December 23, 2020	85 FR 83745	2020–28606		
205	13969	Expanding Educational Opportunity Through School Choice	December 28, 2020	January 4, 2021	86 FR 219	2020–29235		
206	13970	Adjustments of Certain Rates of Pay (Note: Supersedes: EO 13901 of December 26, 2019.)	December 31, 2020	January 6, 2021	86 FR 421	2021–00040		(Note: Superseded by EO 14061 of December 22, 2021.)

== 2021 ==
Relative no.	Absolute no.	Title / Description	Date signed	Date published	FR citation	FR doc. no.	Ref.	Revoked by – EO no.
207	13971	Addressing the Threat Posed by Applications and Other Software Developed or Controlled by Chinese Companies	January 5, 2021	January 8, 2021	86 FR 1249	2021–00305		14034
208	13972	Promoting Small Modular Reactors for National Defense and Space Exploration	January 5, 2021	January 14, 2021	86 FR 3727	2021–01013		
209	13973	Providing an Order of Succession Within the Environmental Protection Agency (Note: Revokes: EO 13763 of January 13, 2017.)	January 8, 2021	January 15, 2021	86 FR 3733	2021–01094		
210	13974	Amending Executive Order 13959—Addressing the Threat From Securities Investments That Finance Communist Chinese Military Companies (Note: Amends: EO 13959 of November 12, 2020.)	January 13, 2021	January 19, 2021	86 FR 4875	2021–01228		14032
211	13975	Encouraging Buy American Policies for the United States Postal Service	January 14, 2021	January 21, 2021	86 FR 6547	2021–01469		14005
212	13976	Establishing the Wildland Fire Management Policy Committee	January 14, 2021	January 21, 2021	86 FR 6549	2021–01476		
213	13977	Protecting Law Enforcement Officers, Judges, Prosecutors, and Their Families	January 18, 2021	January 22, 2021	86 FR 6803	2021–01635		
214	13978	Building the National Garden of American Heroes (Note: Amends: EO 13934 of July 3, 2020.)	January 18, 2021	January 22, 2021	86 FR 6809	2021–01643		14029
215	13979	Ensuring Democratic Accountability in Agency Rulemaking	January 18, 2021	January 22, 2021	86 FR 6813	2021–01644		14018
216	13980	Protecting Americans From Overcriminalization Through Regulatory Reform	January 18, 2021	January 22, 2021	86 FR 6817	2021–01645		14029
217	13981	Protecting the United States From Certain Unmanned Aircraft Systems	January 18, 2021	January 22, 2021	86 FR 6821	2021–01646		
218	13982	Care of Veterans With Service in Uzbekistan	January 19, 2021	January 25, 2021	86 FR 6833	2021–01712		
219	13983	Revocation of Executive Order 13770 (Note: Revokes: EO 13770 of January 28, 2017.)	January 19, 2021	January 25, 2021	86 FR 6835	2021–01713		
220	13984	Taking Additional Steps to Address the National Emergency with Respect to Significant Malicious Cyber-Enabled Activities (Note: Amends: EO 13694 of April 1, 2015.)	January 19, 2021	January 25, 2021	86 FR 6837	2021–01714		

== See also ==
- Executive order
- List of executive actions by Barack Obama, EO #13489–13764 (2009–2017)
- List of executive actions by Donald Trump
- List of executive actions by Joe Biden, EO #13985–14146 (2021–2025)
- List of executive orders in the second Trump presidency, EO #14147–present (2025–present)
- List of bills in the 115th United States Congress
- List of bills in the 116th United States Congress
