= Trump executive orders =

Trump executive orders may refer to:

- List of executive orders in the first Trump presidency (2017–2021)
- List of executive orders in the second Trump presidency (since 2025)

== See also ==
- List of executive actions by Donald Trump
