= List of executive orders in the presidency of Donald Trump =

The following articles cover the executive orders signed by Donald Trump as 45th & 47th president of the United States:

- List of executive orders in the first presidency of Donald Trump
- List of executive orders in the second presidency of Donald Trump
