= Executive Order 13766 =

Executive order signed by U.S. President Donald Trump

- Expediting Environmental Reviews and Approvals for High Priority Infrastructure Projects
- Type: Executive order
- Number: 13766
- President: Donald Trump
- Signed: January 24, 2017

Federal Register details
- Federal Register document number: 2017-02029
- Publication date: January 30, 2017
- Document citation: 8657

Summary
- Directs agencies to expedite the approval of infrastructure projects

Repealed by
- Executive Order 13990, "Protecting Public Health and the Environment and Restoring Science to Tackle the Climate Crisis", January 20, 2021

Executive Order 13766 is the second executive order signed by U.S. President Donald Trump. Signed on January 24, 2017, this order establishes a new system by which to fast-track the construction of infrastructure projects.

The executive order came as a precursor to an expected larger infrastructure spending proposal, which has been polled as one of Trump's most important campaign promises. The signing of this executive order came on the same day that Trump signed Presidential memoranda intended to permit the construction of the Keystone XL, the Dakota Access Pipeline, and stipulated that all new pipelines in the United States must be constructed using materials and equipment produced in the United States.

It was revoked by President Biden on January 20, 2021.

== Provisions ==
The executive order is broken down into four sections:

- Executive agencies should expedite environmental reviews and approvals for all infrastructure projects. Projects such as electrical grid improvements and upgrades to ports, airports, pipelines, bridges, highways, and other projects that are deemed a "high priority to the nation" should be granted preference in this process.
- Governors of States and executive agency heads may request that the Chairman of the White House Council on Environmental Quality (CEQ) approve infrastructure projects where a Federal review is needed. The chairman shall provide a response within 30 days.
- Executive agency heads shall provide written explanations to the Chairman of the CEQ explaining the causes for any delays in approval for project requests.
- All actions taken as a result of this order must be consistent with existing law. The order shall not impair the abilities of any executive department or agency. The order shall not impact the functions of the Office of Management and Budget.

== Impact ==
In his speech to a joint session of Congress on February 28, 2017, Trump called for one trillion dollars of new infrastructure spending. This executive order is expected to streamline the construction of projects that come out of that spending package, should it pass the Congress.

== See also ==
- List of executive actions by Donald Trump
