= Executive Order 13770 =

Executive order by Donald Trump

- Executive Order on the Ethics Commitments by Executive Branch Appointees
- Executive Order 13770 uploaded to Wikisource and published by the Federal Register
- Type: Executive order
- Number: 13770
- President: Donald Trump
- Signed: January 28, 2017

Federal Register details
- Federal Register document number: 2017-02450
- Publication date: February 3, 2017
- Document citation: 9333

Summary
- Directs executive branch employees on a ban on lobbying any government official for two years and the agency they worked in for five years. It also prevents them from ever lobbying the US on behalf of a foreign government or foreign political parties.

Repealed by
- Executive Order 13983, "Revocation of Executive Order 13770", January 19, 2021

Executive Order 13770, entitled "Ethics Commitments by Executive Branch Appointees," was an executive order issued by US President Donald Trump on January 28, 2017, that directs executive branch employees on a ban from becoming a lobbyist for five years. The order, which reflected an increasingly standard practice of issuing such ethics rules by executive order early in a new administration, borrowed language from similar orders issued by past administrations.

Trump revoked the order on the final day of his presidency, allowing his administration's officials to immediately begin working as lobbyists.

== Purpose ==
Ethics Pledge. Every appointee in every executive agency appointed on or after January 20, 2017, shall sign, and upon signing shall be contractually committed to, the following pledge upon becoming an appointee:

As a condition, and in consideration, of my employment in the United States Government in an appointee position invested with the public trust, I commit myself to the following obligations, which I understand are binding on me and are enforceable under law:

1. I will not, within 5 years after the termination of my employment as an appointee in any executive agency in which I am appointed to serve, engage in lobbying activities with respect to that agency.

2. If, upon my departure from the Government, I am covered by the post-employment restrictions on communicating with employees of my former executive agency set forth in section 207(c) of title 18, United States Code, I agree that I will abide by those restrictions.

3. In addition to abiding by the limitations of paragraphs 1 and 2, I also agree, upon leaving Government service, not to engage in lobbying activities with respect to any covered executive branch official or non-career Senior Executive Service appointee for the remainder of the Administration.

4. I will not, at any time after the termination of my employment in the United States Government, engage in any activity on behalf of any foreign government or foreign political party which, were it undertaken on January 20, 2017, would require me to register under the Foreign Agents Registration Act of 1938, as amended.

5. I will not accept gifts from registered lobbyists or lobbying organizations for the duration of my service as an appointee.

6. I will not for a period of 2 years from the date of my appointment participate in any particular matter involving specific parties that is directly and substantially related to my former employer or former clients, including regulations and contracts.

7. If I was a registered lobbyist within the 2 years before the date of my appointment, in addition to abiding by the limitations of paragraph 6, I will not for a period of 2 years after the date of my appointment participate in any particular matter on which I lobbied within the 2 years before the date of my appointment or participate in the specific issue area in which that particular matter falls.

8. I agree that any hiring or other employment decisions I make will be based on the candidate's qualifications, competence, and experience.

9. I acknowledge that the Executive Order entitled 'Ethics Commitments by Executive Branch Appointees,' issued by the President on January 28, 2017, which I have read before signing this document, defines certain terms applicable to the foregoing obligations and sets forth the methods for enforcing them. I expressly accept the provisions of that Executive Order as a part of this agreement and as binding on me. I understand that the obligations of this pledge are in addition to any statutory or other legal restrictions applicable to me by virtue of Government service.

== Review of order ==
The executive order directs executive branch employees on a ban on lobbying any government official for two years and the agency they worked in for five years. It also prevents them from ever lobbying the US on behalf of a foreign government or foreign political parties. If someone is found guilty of not complying with the order, they could be barred for another five years on top of the order's five years for a total of ten years. Section 3 provides that the president may grant a waiver to any person of any restriction contained in the pledge. The order does not explain on what grounds a waiver may be granted. The order has a lifetime ban on lobbying for foreign governments.

== Revocation ==
Trump revoked the order on the final day of his presidency without explanation. This allowed his appointees, some of whom had trouble finding work after the White House, to immediately begin working as lobbyists. President Bill Clinton similarly revoked his comparable executive order at the end of his presidency, something Trump criticized him for during the 2016 campaign.

== Reaction ==
NPR's Tamara Keith states, "As Trump's team drafted his order on ethics, they appear to have borrowed heavily from the language used in orders signed by both Clinton and President Obama. Obama also pulled from Clinton, in parts and the ethics directive signed by President George W. Bush is nearly identical to the one signed by his father twelve years earlier. But that's less surprising given those were presidents using the language of their predecessor from the same party. Perhaps more importantly, Trump not only seems to be lifting from Democratic presidents' language, but they are presidents he has condemned, including for not draining the swamp." "The story here is not the copying per se, it is the claim Trump has been making that he is doing something really different, new, and righteous when, apparently, in many respects he is actually copying Democrats he so thoroughly condemned as corrupt," said John Woolley, a professor at UC Santa Barbara and co-director of the Presidency Project.

Government watchdog groups criticized the revocation of the order. Robert Weissman, president of consumer-rights group Public Citizen, said that "The revocation of the 5-year lobbying ban for presidential appointees is the perfect coda for the most corrupt administration in American history." Noah Bookbinder, executive director of the nonpartisan government ethics and accountability watchdog group Citizens for Responsibility and Ethics in Washington, said that "By rescinding his ethics order and letting his staffers immediately become lobbyists, the man who pledged to drain the swamp took a giant step to fill it." News coverage contrasted the revocation of the ban with Trump's earlier pledge to "drain the swamp."

== See also ==
- List of executive actions by Donald Trump
