= Executive Order 13775 =

Order signed by the President in 2017

- Providing an Order of Succession Within the Department of Justice
- Executive Order 13775 in the Federal Register
- Type: Executive order
- Number: 13775
- President: Donald Trump
- Signed: February 9, 2017

Federal Register details
- Federal Register document number: 2017-03116
- Publication date: February 14, 2017
- Document citation: 10697

Summary
- Changes the line of succession for the Department of Justice

Executive Order 13775, titled "Providing an Order of Succession Within the Department of Justice", is the eleventh executive order signed by U.S. President Donald Trump. Signed on February 9, 2017, the order changes the line of succession for the Department of Justice (DOJ). This order specifically reverses changes made to the DOJ line of succession that former President Barack Obama made in executive order 13762.

== Background ==
On January 13, 2017, during the Presidential transition of Donald Trump, then President Obama issued executive order 13762. This order changed the Department of Justice line of succession to the following:

1. Attorney General
2. Deputy Attorney General
3. Associate Attorney General
4. United States Attorney for the District of Columbia
5. United States Attorney for the Northern District of Illinois
6. United States Attorney for the Central District of California

Notably, this order removed the United States Attorney for the Eastern District of Virginia from the fourth position in the line.

Following the resignation of Attorney General Loretta Lynch at the end of the presidential transition, Deputy Attorney General Sally Yates ascended to the position of Acting Attorney General, a position she would presumably retain until the confirmation of Jeff Sessions, who was Donald Trump's nomination for the position.

On January 27, 2017, Trump signed Executive Order 13769, which placed limits on travel to the U.S. from certain countries, and by all refugees. This provoked several lawsuits, including Washington v. Trump, that sought to challenge the constitutionality of the order. On January 30, Yates publicly refused to defend the order, and also barred all other DOJ personnel from defending the order as well. Later that day Yates was fired for insubordination and the United States Attorney for the Eastern District of Virginia, Dana Boente, was appointed to the position of Acting Attorney General.

On February 9 Trump issued Executive Order 13775 which changed the DOJ's order of succession. This order designated the United States Attorney for the Eastern District of Virginia as the fourth position in the line, the position it formerly occupied.

This Executive Order was revoked on March 31, 2017.

== Provisions ==
The executive order is broken down into four sections:

- The new line of succession at the Department of Justice is now:
  1. Attorney General
  2. Deputy Attorney General
  3. Associate Attorney General
  4. United States Attorney for the Eastern District of Virginia
  5. United States Attorney for the Northern District of Illinois
  6. United States Attorney for the Western District of Missouri
- Individuals who are only acting members of the positions outlined in the first section are not in the line of succession. The President retains the ability to depart from the line of succession in designating future acting attorneys general.
- Executive Order 13762 is revoked.
- The order should not be construed as creating any new rights or benefits.

== See also ==
- List of executive actions by Donald Trump
