= Executive Order 13771 =

2017 US Presidential executive order

- Reducing Regulation and Controlling Regulatory Costs
- Executive Order 13771 in the Federal Register
- Type: Executive order
- Number: 13771
- President: Donald Trump
- Signed: January 30, 2017

Federal Register details
- Federal Register document number: 2017-02451
- Publication date: February 3, 2017

Summary
- Directs agencies to: identify at least two existing regulations for repeal in place of every new regulation; manage expenditure so that the total cost of new regulations does not increase.

Repealed by
- Executive Order 13992, "Revocation of Certain Executive Orders Concerning Federal Regulation", January 20, 2021

Executive Order 13771, titled "Reducing Regulation and Controlling Regulatory Costs", was an executive order signed by U.S. President Donald Trump on January 30, 2017.

On January 20, 2021, President Joe Biden rescinded the executive order.

== Provisions ==
Executive Order 13771 required any executive department or agency planning to publicly announce a new regulation to propose at least two regulations to be repealed. The cost of the implementation of these new regulations was supposed to be less than or equal to 0 dollars. If costs above 0 dollars were accrued, the payment of these costs were to be funded through the elimination of more regulations. Advice on the financial aspect of these matters was provided by the director of the Office of Management and Budget. Under the executive order, it was up to the director to notify agencies of their total incremental costs for a given year. The director was allowed to issue both increases or decreases in said costs. The director also had the authority to exempt regulations/agencies from compliance with the Executive Order.

== Lawsuit ==
In February 2017, Public Citizen, Natural Resources Defense Council, and Communications Workers of America filed a lawsuit seeking to block implementation of the Executive Order 13771. The plaintiffs argued that Trump's executive order unconstitutionally violated the separation of powers; violated the Constitution's Take Care Clause; and would force federal agencies to violate governing statutes, like the Administrative Procedure Act which establishes the way agencies pass regulations, by forcing agencies to repeal beneficial regulations and arbitrarily preventing new regulations to be passed. The plaintiffs alleged that the executive order would also endanger public health, safety, and the environment and will force federal agencies to violate current governing statutes by ignoring the non-financial benefits current and potential regulations bring to the public. (Note: In particular, the lawsuit cited several regulations that would be adversely affected, including the Motor Vehicle Safety Act, Motor Carrier Safety Act, Occupational Safety and Health Act, Mine Safety and Health Act. Toxic Substance Control Act, Hazardous Materials Transportation Act, Federal Railroad Safety Act, Federal Water Pollution Control Act, Energy Policy and Conservation Act, Endangered Species Act, and Clean Air Act.) Fourteen Republican-led states filed an amici curiae in support of the executive order.

In December 2019, U.S. District Judge Randolph D. Moss dismissed the case, concluding that plaintiffs lacked standing. The court found that "it is certainly plausible, and perhaps likely" that the executive order and accompanying OMB guidance "have delayed or derailed at least some regulatory actions that, if adopted, would materially benefit Plaintiffs or some of their members." However, the court found that this was insufficient to establish standing, since "it is hard to say with the requisite degree of confidence which actions those are, what would have occurred in the absence of the Executive Order, how any identifiable individual (or entity) is harmed, and whether any such harm—or risk of harm—is sufficient to establish standing," because the administration did not identify "whether and when a proposed ... regulatory action [has been] delayed or abandoned due to the requirements of the Executive Order." The plaintiffs opted not to appeal the dismissal of the case.

== Rescission ==
Former Obama-era Director of the FTC's Bureau of Consumer Protection and Public Citizen Litigation Group lawyer David Vladeck called the executive order "unconstitutional, illegal and stupid," saying "if you really want to reduce the regulatory load, you can't use a shotgun, you have to use a scalpel."

President Joe Biden rescinded the executive order, along with certain other Trump executive orders, on January 20, 2021, his first day in office.

== See also ==
- List of executive actions by Donald Trump
