= National Council for the American Worker =

The National Council for the American Worker was an entity within the White House during the Trump administration whose aim was to "ensure that America’s students and workers have access to affordable, relevant, and innovative education and job training that will equip them to compete and win in the global economy." It was established as an executive order by President Donald Trump on July 19, 2018.

It was abolished by President Biden by Executive Order on April 26, 2021 when he established the Task Force on Worker Organizing and Empowerment

Companies involved in the training and hiring of workers were Walmart, Home Depot, General Motors and Microsoft. The program was expected to create 3.7 million new jobs.

== Membership ==
Structure and membership of the United States National Council for the American Worker:

- Co-Chairs
  - Wilbur Ross (Secretary of Commerce)
  - Eugene Scalia (Secretary of Labor)
  - Andrew Bremberg (Assistant to the President for Domestic Policy)
  - Ivanka Trump (Advisor to the President)
- Members
  - Steven Mnuchin (Secretary of the Treasury)
  - Betsy DeVos (Secretary of Education)
  - Robert Wilkie (Secretary of Veterans Affairs)
  - Russell Vought (Acting Director of the Office of Management and Budget)
  - Jovita Carranza (Administrator of the Small Business Administration)
  - Chris Liddell (White House Deputy Chief of Staff for Policy Coordination)
  - Larry Kudlow (Director of the National Economic Council)
  - Kevin Hassett (Chair of the Council of Economic Advisers)
  - Kelvin Droegemeier (Acting Director of the National Science Foundation)
  - Kelvin Droegemeier (Director of the Office of Science and Technology Policy)
