= Executive Order 13992 =

Executive order signed by U.S. President Joe Biden

- "Revocation of Certain Executive Orders Concerning Federal Regulation"
- Type: Executive order
- Number: 13992
- President: Joe Biden
- Signed: January 20, 2021

Federal Register details
- Federal Register document number: 2021-01767
- Publication date: January 20, 2021

Summary
- Withdrawing certain federal regulation executive orders.

Executive Order 13992, officially titled Revocation of Certain Executive Orders Concerning Federal Regulation, was signed on January 20, 2021, and is the eighth executive order signed by U.S. President Joe Biden. The order worked to withdraw certain federal regulation executive orders from the previous Trump administration. It was rescinded by Donald Trump within hours of his assuming office on January 20, 2025 following his re-election to his second, nonconsecutive term.

== Provisions ==
This order aims to deal with critical and prevalent issues. In order for President Biden to tackle matters, such as the COVID-19 pandemic, economic recovery, social justice, and climate change, Biden believes he needs to eliminate past orders from former President Donald J. Trump. In order to address the nation's critical issues such as the COVID-19 pandemic, economic recovery, social justice, and climate change, President Biden intends to employ existing tools. Executive departments and agencies need the ability to make strong regulatory action possible to successfully handle these problems to achieve national goals. This ordinance removes detrimental policies and directives, which threaten to impede the ability of the federal government to deal with such issues and enables agencies to make use of suitable regulatory instruments to achieve these objectives.

== Effects ==
The order will lead to the Biden administration having more power and flexibility with executive orders. Since this order will give President Biden the means to strike down past orders that he believes hinder the government's ability to take on the COVID-19 pandemic, economic recovery, social justice, and climate change, Biden will be able to eliminate anything that he finds threatening. So far, President Biden has used this order to revoke six executive orders signed by former President Donald J. Trump. President Biden eliminated Executive Order 13771, 13777, 13875, 13891, 13892, 13893.

== See also ==
- List of executive orders in the first presidency of Donald Trump
- List of executive actions by Joe Biden
- 2020 United States census
