= Executive Order 13772 =

2017 American executive order on regulation

- Core Principles for Regulating the United States Financial System

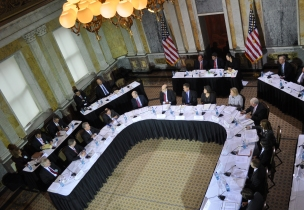
- The Financial Stability Oversight Council, the subject of review by the Department of the Treasury under this executive order.
- Executive Order 13772 in the Federal Register
- Type: Executive order
- Number: 13772
- President: Donald Trump
- Signed: February 3, 2017

Federal Register details
- Federal Register document number: 2017-02762
- Publication date: February 8, 2017
- Document citation: 9965

Summary
- Outlines the "Core Principles" of financial regulation; Directs the Secretary of the Treasury to review the Financial Stability Oversight Council

Executive Order 13772, titled "Core Principles for Regulating the United States Financial System", is an executive order signed by U.S. President Donald Trump on February 3, 2017. The eighth executive action by the president during his first 100 days in office, it establishes the "core principles" of regulation under the Trump Administration and tasks the United States Department of the Treasury to review the Financial Stability Oversight Council, originally established under the Dodd–Frank Wall Street Reform and Consumer Protection Act, and report to the President in 120 days on current regulations and their effectiveness in carrying out these core principles.

President Joe Biden revoked the order on February 24, 2021.

== Background ==
The Dodd–Frank Wall Street Reform and Consumer Protection Act, also known as simply Dodd–Frank, is a series of laws that enacted significant financial regulation reform, as a response to the Great Recession. It was signed into law by then-U.S. President Barack Obama in July 2010, marking the occasion with the promise that "the American people will never again be asked to foot the bill for Wall Street's mistakes – there will be no more taxpayer-funded bailouts. Period." Among many provisions, such as numerous amendments to previous legislation, introductions of new regulations, and reforms of Government agencies such as the U.S. Securities and Exchange Commission, Dodd-Frank also established the Financial Stability Oversight Council and the supporting Office of Financial Research, which aims to identify threats to the financial stability of the United States. In the years following its enactment, Dodd–Frank had been described as a success by some financial analysts and the act's original creators. Supporters of the act said that the regulations had a positive impact on the financial sector, citing a decrease in the share of consumer deposits and profits held by large banks such as JPMorgan Chase and Bank of America, allowing for more competition in the industry. Economist Paul Krugman, for instance, wrote in 2014 that the act was working, and praised the Consumer Financial Protection Bureau and the Act's creation of regulatory Ordinary Liquidation Authority (also called resolution authority), which allows regulators in a crisis situation to save "systemically important" banks and other financial institutions without a bailout.

Since its inception, congressional Republicans have opposed Dodd-Frank. On the campaign trial, Republicans "repeatedly invoked the law's 848-page girth — and its rules on, among other things, trading derivatives and swaps — as a symbol of government overreach that is killing jobs." In 2012, for example, Republicans in the House Financial Services Committee voted to repeal a portion of the law; the legislation did not pass.

Donald Trump has been harshly critical of Dodd-Frank, describing it as a "very negative force, which has developed a very bad name", and consistently calling for either a full repeal or major changes to the act throughout his 2016 presidential campaign. This reflected the Republican Party's platform regarding the act. Trump claimed during the campaign that the Act "made it impossible for bankers to function", and that the regulations installed by the act "[make it] very hard for bankers to loan money for people to create jobs, for people with businesses to create jobs." Days after the election, Trump's transition team pledged to "dismantle" Dodd-Frank.

== Development ==
Formal plans and discussion on part of Trump regarding Dodd–Frank and potential replacements began as early as June 2016, when Trump met with Congressman Jeb Hensarling, chair of the House Committee on Financial Services, to discuss alternatives to the act. During the presidential campaign, both Trump and campaign chairman were open to the idea of reinstating the Glass–Steagall Act, a provision of the 1933 Banking Act signed by President Franklin D. Roosevelt that placed tight restrictions on the banking industry, such as the prohibition of bank sales of securities, and the appropriation of funds for banks through the Federal Reserve System. The act was originally introduced to restore public confidence in the banking system after the Great Depression, however, a majority of the provisions were repealed by the Clinton Administration in 1999 through the Gramm–Leach–Bliley Act, following a decades-long decline in support among economists, businessmen, and politicians who did not find the restrictions to be productive. While formal plans to reintroduce the act were not made, Trump stated that a "21st century" Glass–Steagall Act would "help African American businesses get the credit they need." Delegates at the 2016 Republican National Convention voted to include a repeal of Dodd-Frank and a revival of Glass-Stegall as part of the party's platform for the 2016 elections, and Republican Party congressmen have since supported it.

== Order ==
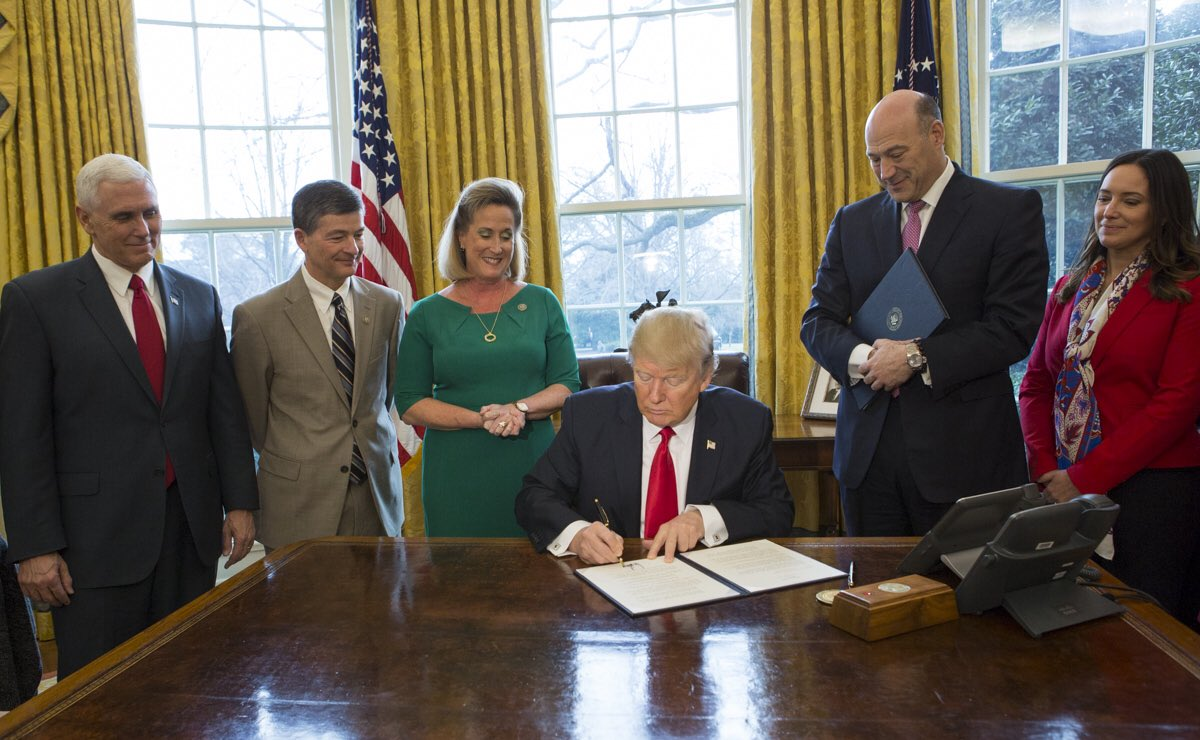
President Trump signs the executive order in the Oval office on February 3, 2017.

The executive order was signed by President Trump on February 3, 2017. The order is organized into three sections, one on Policy, one a directive to the Secretary of the Treasury, and one on General Provisions. The section on Policy outlines and officially states the six primary goals of the Trump Administration in regards to financial regulation, described in the order as the "Core Principles". They include:

(a) empower Americans to make independent financial decisions and informed choices in the marketplace, save for retirement, and build individual wealth;
(b) prevent taxpayer-funded bailouts;
(c) foster economic growth and vibrant financial markets through more rigorous regulatory impact analysis that addresses systemic risk and market failures, such as moral hazard and information asymmetry;
(d) enable American companies to be competitive with foreign firms in domestic and foreign markets;
(e) advance American interests in international financial regulatory negotiations and meetings;
(g) [sic] restore public accountability within Federal financial regulatory agencies and rationalize the Federal financial regulatory framework.

The second section of the order issues a directive to the Secretary of the Treasury, ordering them to conduct meetings with members of the Financial Stability Oversight Council and report back to the President within 120 days on "the extent to which existing laws, treaties, regulations, guidance, reporting and recordkeeping requirements, and other Government policies promote the Core Principles and what actions have been taken, and are currently being taken, to promote and support the Core Principles." The report will serve as a citation to repeal or amend any existing laws highlighted in the report as inhibitive to the Core Principles outlined in the section on Policy. The third section on General Provisions is a generic disclaimer that states the order abides by the United States Constitution, and does not impair the functions of relevant Government departments or agencies, with the Office of Management and Budget being specifically mentioned.

== See also ==
- List of executive actions by Donald Trump
