= Executive Order 13776 =

American presidential exec order

- Establishing the Task Force on Crime Reduction and Public Safety
- Type: Executive order
- Number: 13776
- President: Donald Trump
- Signed: February 9, 2017

Federal Register details
- Federal Register document number: 2017-03118
- Publication date: February 14, 2017
- Document citation: 82-10699

Summary
- Establishes the Task Force on Crime Reduction and Public Safety to support local, state, and federal law enforcement agencies in combating illegal immigration, drug trafficking, and violent crime.

Executive Order 13776, titled "Establishing the Task Force on Crime Reduction and Public Safety", was an executive order issued by United States President Donald Trump on February 9, 2017, which established the Task Force on Crime Reduction and Public Safety. The goal of the Task Force was to support local, state, and federal law enforcement agencies in combating illegal immigration, drug trafficking, and violent crime, and to propose new legislation and recommend policy changes to further those aims.

== Background ==
The United States experienced an increase in violent crime rates in the years leading up to the establishment of the Task Force. Concerned about the growing crime rate, President Trump signed Executive Order 13776 to strengthen law enforcement efforts and reduce crime in American communities.

== Task Force on Crime Reduction and Public Safety ==
The Task Force was created to coordinate the efforts of various federal agencies, including the United States Department of Justice, Department of Homeland Security, and Federal Bureau of Investigation, to support local and state law enforcement agencies in their fight against crime.

=== Goals ===
The primary goals of the Task Force were to:

Identify deficiencies in existing laws and recommend new legislation to fill those gaps Evaluate the availability and adequacy of crime-related data and develop strategies to improve data collection Identify best practices and successful strategies for combating crime Propose ways to improve the safety and well-being of law enforcement officers Make recommendations to the President for actions to promote public safety and reduce crime

== Criticisms ==
The Task Force faced criticism from various groups who argued that it could lead to over-policing and racial profiling. Others were concerned that the Task Force's focus on illegal immigration and drug trafficking would divert resources away from other important crime-fighting initiatives.

== Dissolution ==
The Task Force was dissolved after completing its work and submitting its recommendations to the President. Its findings and proposals informed the administration's subsequent crime reduction efforts and policy changes.

== See also ==
- Executive order (United States)
- List of executive actions by Donald Trump
- Law enforcement in the United States
