= Executive Order 14005 =

Executive order signed by U.S. President Joe Biden

- "Strengthening Buy American Provisions, Ensuring Future of America is Made in America by All of America's Workers"
- Type: Executive order
- Number: 14005
- President: Joe Biden
- Signed: January 25, 2021

Federal Register details
- Federal Register document number: 2021-02038
- Publication date: January 25, 2021

Summary
- Ensures that the federal government is investing taxpayer dollars in American businesses. Additionally appoints a new senior leader in the Executive Office of the President in charge of the government’s Made-in-America policy approach.

Executive Order 14005, officially titled Ensuring the Future Is Made in All of America by All of America's Workers, is an executive order signed by U.S. President Joe Biden on January 25, 2021, which ensures that the federal government invests taxpayer dollars in American-owned businesses. The order additionally appoints a new senior leader in the Executive Office of the President in charge of the government's Made-in-America policy approach.

On October 4, 2021, the White House Made in America Office launched madeinamerica.gov, a public website where the waivers under Made in America laws will be easy to find for businesses seeking contracting opportunities with federal agencies.

== See also ==
- List of executive actions by Joe Biden
