= Advancing American Kidney Health =

American government initiative

Advancing American Kidney Health is an initiative to improve kidney care in the United States which was launched through Executive Order by President Donald Trump on July 10, 2019.

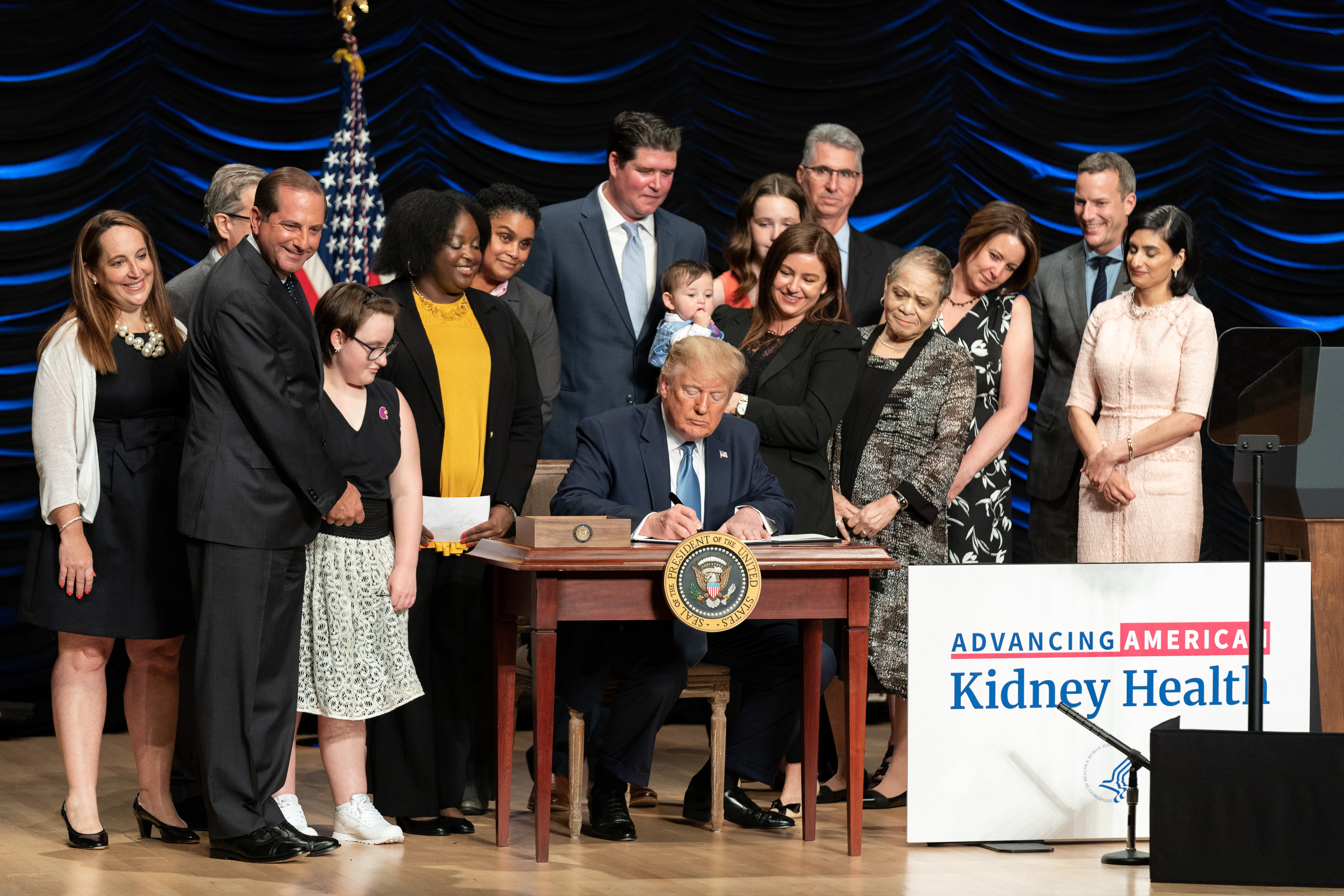
President Trump signs an Executive Order on Advancing American Kidney Health.

In 2019, chronic kidney disease was estimated to have a prevalence of more than 15 percent among adults in the United States, and nearly 100,000 Americans were waiting for a kidney transplant. The purpose of the Advancing American Kidney Health initiative was to improve this situation and thereby reduce healthcare costs by encouraging preventive modes of care, creating incentives to increase the proportion of home dialysis treatment and making kidney transplants available to more patients.

== Goals ==
The initiative stated three explicit goals: to ensure that 80 percent of patients newly diagnosed with kidney failure would either receive a transplant or at-home dialysis by 2025; to reduce the instances of kidney failure by one fourth by 2030; to make twice as many kidneys available for transplant by 2030. The means to achieve the goals would include a restructuring of payment models within Medicare, thus making home therapy more financially attractive and in-center therapy less so.

== Public reception ==
The initiative was generally well received at the time of launch, with patient advocates and officials within the United States Department of Health and Human Services commenting that the existing health system for kidney care was overdue for reform and had failed to create incentives for early detection and prevention. The implementation of reforms was slowed down by the impact of the 2020 COVID-19 pandemic.
