= Executive Order 13990 =

Executive order signed by U.S. President Joe Biden

- Protecting Public Health and the Environment and Restoring Science to Tackle the Climate Crisis

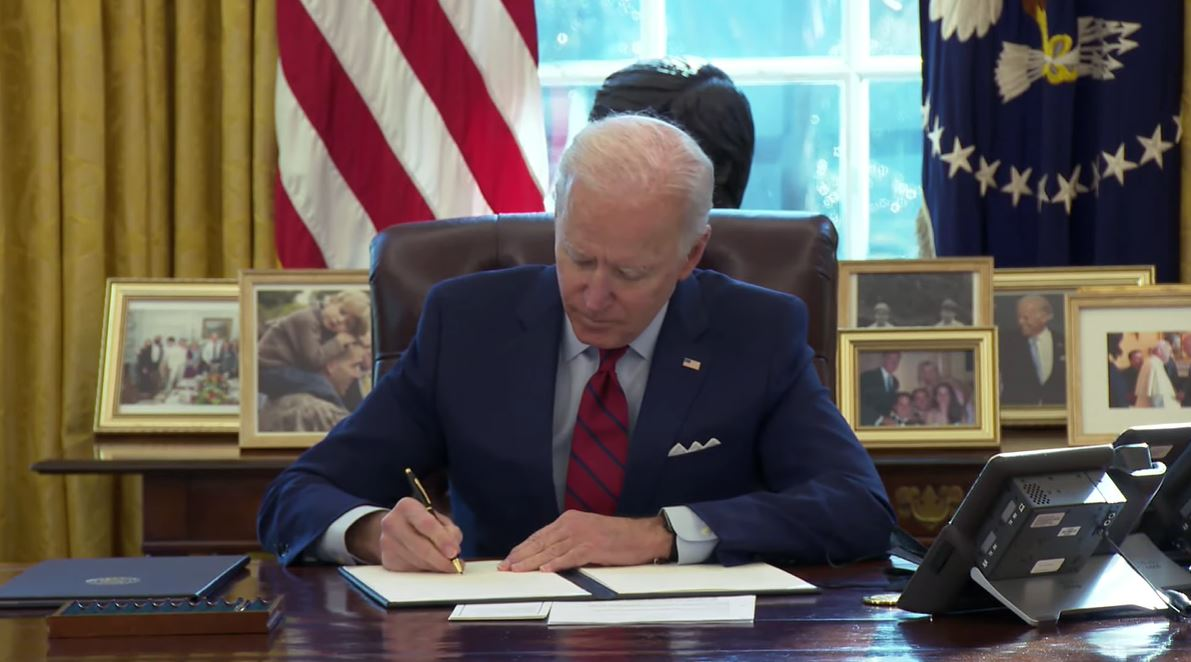
- President Biden signs a series of Executive Orders amongst which was order 13990 shortly after his inauguration on January 20th, 2021.
- Type: Executive order
- Number: 13990
- President: Joe Biden
- Signed: January 20, 2021

Federal Register details
- Federal Register document number: 2021-01765
- Publication date: January 20, 2021

Summary
- Implements various environmental policies including the revocation of the permit for the Keystone Pipeline and temporarily prohibits drilling in the arctic refuge.

Executive Order 13990, officially titled Protecting Public Health and the Environment and Restoring Science to Tackle the Climate Crisis was an executive order signed by President Joe Biden on January 20, 2021, which implements various environmental policies of his administration including revoking the permit for the Keystone XL Pipeline and temporarily prohibiting drilling in the arctic refuge. It was rescinded by Donald Trump within hours of his assuming office on January 20, 2025.

== Provisions ==
Executive Order 13990 includes several provisions designed to reverse actions taken by the previous administration and recommit the United States to combating climate change. Key provisions of the order include:

- Rejoining the Paris Agreement on climate change.
- Directing federal agencies to review and, if necessary, revise or suspend regulations and policies that may hinder environmental protection or public health.
- Establishing a review process to identify actions that may disproportionately affect disadvantaged communities.
- Directing federal agencies to ensure that their actions are based on the best available science and data.
- Revoking the permit for the Keystone XL pipeline.
- Placing a temporary moratorium on oil and gas leasing in the Arctic National Wildlife Refuge

The order was one of fifteen signed during the first day of the Biden administration.

== Reactions ==
Climate activists like Rachel Cleetus and Jonna Hamilton praised the order.

Many politicians from the Republican Party criticized the order.

== Litigation ==
=== Louisiana v. Biden (2022) ===
On February 11, 2022, Western Louisiana U.S. District Court Judge James D. Cain Jr. issued a preliminary injunction in Louisiana v. Biden (2022) in favor of the plaintiffs to block federal agency requirements to assess the social costs of greenhouse gas emissions in regulatory actions under the order. On March 16, the U.S. 5th Circuit Court of Appeals stayed the decision following an appeal by the U.S. Justice Department, and on May 26, the U.S. Supreme Court issued an order without comment or opposition dismissing an appeal filed by the plaintiffs to vacate the 5th Circuit Court of Appeals decision.

=== Missouri v. Biden (2022) ===
On August 31, 2021, Eastern Missouri U.S. District Court Judge Audrey G. Fleissig issued an order dismissing a request filed by the plaintiffs in Missouri v. Biden (2022) for a preliminary injunction to block federal agency requirements to assess the social costs of greenhouse gas emissions in regulatory actions under the order. On September 3, the plaintiffs filed an appeal with the U.S. 8th Circuit Court of Appeals. Oral arguments were held on June 16, 2022.

== See also ==
- List of executive actions by Joe Biden
