= List of executive actions by Donald Trump =

The president of the United States may take any of several kinds of executive actions.

Executive orders are issued to help officers and agencies of the executive branch manage the operations within the federal government itself. Presidential memoranda are closely related, and have the force of law on the Executive Branch, but are generally considered less prestigious. Presidential memoranda do not have an established process for issuance, and unlike executive orders, they are not numbered. A presidential determination results in an official policy or position of the executive branch of the United States government. A presidential proclamation is a statement issued by a president on a matter of public policy, under specific authority granted to the president by Congress, typically on a matter of widespread interest. Administrative orders are signed documents such as notices, letters, and orders, that can be issued to conduct administrative operations of the federal government. A presidential notice or a presidential sequestration order can also be issued. National security directives (Note: National Security and Homeland Security Presidential Directives address continuity of government in the event of a "catastrophic emergency" disrupting the U.S. population, economy, environment, infrastructure and government policy.) operate like executive orders, but are only in the area of national security. They have been issued by different presidents under various names.

Listed below are executive orders numbered 13765–13984, presidential proclamations, presidential memoranda, presidential determinations, administrative orders, presidential notices, presidential sequestration orders, and national security presidential memoranda (Note: National security directives are generally highly classified and are not executive orders. However, in an unprecedented move, the Trump administration ordered their national security directives to be published in the Federal Register.) signed by U.S. president Donald Trump (2017–2021). In his first term he issued a total of 894 executive actions, of which 220 were executive orders.

== 45th presidency (first term) ==
=== Executive orders ===
United States presidents issue executive orders (in addition to other executive actions) to help officers and agencies of the executive branch manage the operations within the federal government itself.

Donald Trump signed a total of 220 executive orders during his first term, from January 2017 to January 2021. As of January 2025, 72 of them (33%) have been revoked, many by his successor, Joe Biden.

=== Presidential proclamations ===
Donald Trump signed a total of 570 proclamations from January 2017 to January 2021.

View source data.
Cumulative number of proclamations signed by Donald Trump

=== Presidential memoranda ===
==== 2017 ====
No.	Title / Description	Date signed	Date published	FR Citation	FR Doc. Number	Ref.
1	Regarding the Hiring Freeze	January 23, 2017	January 25, 2017	82 FR 8493	2017–01842	
2	Barring international non-governmental organizations that perform or promote abortions from receiving US government funding (Mexico City policy)	January 23, 2017	January 25, 2017	82 FR 8495	2017–01843	
3	Regarding Withdrawal of the United States from the Trans-Pacific Partnership Negotiations and Agreement (Note: On April 26, 2017, Trump announced that he would not have the United States withdraw from the NAFTA Negotiations and Agreement. He will attempt to re-negotiate the agreement with Canada and Mexico.)	January 23, 2017	January 25, 2017	82 FR 8497	2017–01845	
4	Regarding Construction of American Pipelines	January 24, 2017	January 30, 2017	82 FR 8659	2017–02031	
5	Regarding Construction of the Dakota Access Pipeline (Note: Revised: Regarding Construction of the Dakota Access Pipeline of January 24, 2017. Document Citation:82 FR 11129. Document Number:R1-2017-02032. Revised on February 17, 2017.)	January 24, 2017	January 30, 2017	82 FR 8661	2017-02032	
6	Regarding Construction of the Keystone XL Pipeline	January 24, 2017	January 30, 2017	82 FR 8663	2017–02035	
7	Reducing Regulatory Burdens for Domestic Manufacturing	January 24, 2017	January 30, 2017	82 FR 8667	2017–02044	
8	Fiduciary Duty Rule	February 3, 2017	February 7, 2017	82 FR 9675	2017–02656	
9	Implementing Immediate Heightened Screening and Vetting of Applications for Visas and Other Immigration Benefits^{49}	March 6, 2017	April 3, 2017	82 FR 16279	2017–06702	
10	Appropriations request for Fiscal Year (FY) 2017	March 16, 2017	TBA	TBA	TBA	
11	Delegation of Authority Under the National Defense Authorization Act for Fiscal Year 2017 to the Secretary of State	March 20, 2017	April 10, 2017	82 FR 17375	2017–07331	
12	The White House Office of American Innovation	March 27, 2017	TBA	TBA	TBA	
13	Principles for Reforming the Military Selective Service Process	April 3, 2017	TBA	TBA	TBA	
14	A Letter from the President to the Speaker of the House of Representatives and the President Pro Tempore of the Senate (about the 2017 Shayrat missile strike)	April 8, 2017	TBA	TBA	TBA	
15	A Letter from the President to the President of the Senate (about the accession of Montenegro to NATO)	April 11, 2017	TBA	TBA	TBA	
16	Delegation of Authority under the National Defense Authorization Act for Fiscal Year 2017 to the Director of the Federal Bureau	April 12, 2017	April 14, 2017	82 FR 18077	2017–07785	
17	Steel Imports and Threats to National Security	April 20, 2017	TBA	TBA	TBA	
18	Global Magnitsky Human Rights Accountability Act	April 20, 2017	TBA	TBA	TBA	
19	Orderly Liquidation Authority Review	April 21, 2017	TBA	TBA	TBA	
20	Financial Stability Oversight Council	April 21, 2017	TBA	TBA	TBA	
21	Aluminum Imports and Threats to National Security under the Trade Expansion Act of 1962 (Note: Pub. L. 87–794, 76 Stat. 872, enacted October 11, 1962, 19 U.S.C. § 1801)	April 27, 2017	TBA	TBA	TBA	
22	Regarding the Effective date of Executive Order 13780 (Note: On May 25, 2017, United States Court of Appeals for the Fourth Circuit in Richmond, Virginia, refused to reinstate the ban, citing religious discrimination. On June 1, 2017, the Trump administration appealed to the U.S. Supreme Court for the cancellation of the preliminary injunctions and to allow the order to go into effect while the court looks at its ultimate legality later in the year. On June 26, 2017, the Supreme Court partially lifted the halt and would hear oral arguments for the petition to vacate the injunctions in the fall.)	June 14, 2017	June 19, 2017	82 FR 27965	2017–12901	
23	Regarding the Delegation of Authority under the Consolidated Appropriations Act, 2017 to the Secretary of Defense	June 21, 2017	June 26, 2017	82 FR 28981	2017–13491	
24	Regarding the Delegation of Authority under the Consolidated Appropriations Act, 2017 to the Secretary of Homeland Security	June 29, 2017	July 5, 2017	82 FR 31237	2017–14252	
25	Regarding the Delegation of Authority under the Consolidated Appropriations Act, 2017 to the Secretary of Commerce	June 29, 2017	July 5, 2017	82 FR 31239	2017–14253	
26	Regarding the investigation of violations of intellectual property rights and other unfair technology transfers	August 14, 2017	August 18, 2017	82 FR 39007	2017–17528	
27	Regarding the Military Service by Transgender Individuals to the Secretary of Homeland Security	August 25, 2017	August 30, 2017	82 FR 41319	2017–18544	
28	Regarding the Delegation of Authority under the Global Magnitsky Human Rights Accountability Act to the Secretary of State and the Secretary of the Treasury, 2017	September 8, 2017	September 28, 2017	82 FR 45411	2017–21026	
29	Increasing Access to High-Quality Science, Technology, Engineering, and Mathematics (STEM) Education	September 25, 2017	September 28, 2017	82 FR 45417	2017–21032	
30	Regarding the Delegation of Authority under the Consolidated Appropriations Act, 2017 to the Secretary of State	September 25, 2017	October 5, 2017	82 FR 46649	2017–21704	
31	Regarding the Delegation of Certain Functions and Authorities under the Countering America's Adversaries Through Sanctions Act of 2017 to the Secretary of State, the Secretary of the Treasury, and the Secretary of Homeland Security	October 11, 2017	October 27, 2017	82 FR 50051	2017–23617	
32	Regarding the Unmanned Aircraft Systems Integration Pilot Program		October 30, 2017	82 FR 50301	2017–23746	
33	Regarding Combatting the National Drug Demand and Opioid Crisis	October 26, 2017	October 31, 2017	82 FR 50305	2017–23787	
34	Temporary Certification for Certain Records Related to the Assassination of President John F. Kennedy^{40}	October 26, 2017	October 31, 2017	82 FR 50307	2017–23795	
35	Regarding the Delegation of Authority Under the Foreign Aid Transparency and Accountability Act of 2016 to the Director of the Office of Management and Budget^{47}	November 21, 2017	November 29, 2017	82 FR 56529	2017–25845	
36	Regarding the Foreign Assistance Act of 1961 under Pub. L. 115–56 (text) (PDF), 131 Stat. 1129	December 5, 2017	December 26, 2017	82 FR 61125	2017–28026	
37	Regarding the Delaying Submission of the Small Business Administration Report Under the Trade Facilitation and Trade Enforcement Act of 2015 to the Chief Counsel for Advocacy of the Small Business Administration	December 8, 2017	December 13, 2017	82 FR 58705	2017–27037	
38	Reinvigorating America's Human Space Exploration Program	December 11, 2017	December 14, 2017	82 FR 59501	2017–27160	

==== 2018 ====
No.	Title / Description	Date signed	Date published	FR Citation	FR Doc. Number	Ref.
39	Supporting Broadband Tower Facilities in Rural America on Federal Properties Managed by the Department of the Interior	January 8, 2018	January 12, 2018	83 FR 1511	2018–00628	
40	Delegation of Responsibilities under the Frank R. Wolf International Religious Freedom Act	January 9, 2018	January 26, 2018	83 FR 3935	2018–01709	
41	Regarding Non-Public Identity Information Concerning Known Unconsenting United States Persons	January 9, 2018	TBA	TBA	TBA	
42	Delegation of Certain Functions and Authorities under Section 1238 of the National Defense Authorization Act for Fiscal Year 2018	February 5, 2018	February 7, 2018	83 FR 5519	2018–02603	
43	Optimizing the Use of Federal Government Information in Support of the National Vetting Enterprise	February 6, 2018	TBA	TBA	TBA	
44	Delegation of Certain Functions and Authorities under Section 1252 of the National Defense Authorization Act for Fiscal Year 2017	February 8, 2018	February 28, 2018	83 FR 8739	2018–04252	
45	Delegation of Certain Functions and Authorities under Section 1235 of the National Defense Authorization Act for Fiscal Year 2018	February 9, 2018	February 28, 2018	83 FR 8741	2018–04257	'
46	Delegation of Authorities Under Section 1245 of the National Defense Authorization Act for Fiscal Year 2018	February 20, 2018	March 6, 2018	83 FR 9681	2018–04641	
47	Actions by the United States Related to the Section 301 Investigation of China's Laws, Policies, Practices, or Actions Related to Technology Transfer, Intellectual Property, and Innovation	March 22, 2018	March 27, 2018	83 FR 13099	2018–06304	
48	Military Service by Transgender Individuals	March 23, 2018	March 28, 2018	83 FR 13367	2018–06426	
49	Delegation of Authorities Under Section 3136 of the National Defense Authorization Act for Fiscal Year 2018	April 4, 2018	April 9, 2018	83 FR 15289	2018–07418	
50	Ending Catch and Release at the Border of the United States and Directing Other Enhancements to Immigration Enforcement	April 6, 2018	April 13, 2018	83 FR 16179	2018–07962	
51	Promoting Domestic Manufacturing and Job Creation Policies and Procedures Relating to Implementation of Air Quality Standards	April 12, 2018	April 16, 2018	83 FR 16761	2018–08094	
52	Certification for Certain Records Related to the Assassination of President John F. Kennedy	April 26, 2018	May 2, 2018	83 FR 19157	2018–09392	
53	Delegation of Authorities Under Section 1244(c) of the National Defense Authorization Act for Fiscal Year 2018	May 16, 2018	June 21, 2018	83 FR 28761	2018–13440	
54	Delegation of Authority Under Section 709 of the Department of State Authorities Act, Fiscal Year 2017	June 4, 2018	July 3, 2018	83 FR 31321	2018–14485	
55	Modernizing the Monetary Reimbursement Model for the Delivery of Goods Through the International Postal System and Enhancing the Security and Safety of International Mail	August 23, 2018	September 20, 2018	83 FR 47791	2018–20667	
56	Delegation of Authority Under Section 1290(b) of the John S. McCain National Defense Authorization Act for Fiscal Year 2019	September 10, 2018	October 4, 2018	83 FR 50237	2018–21805	
57	Secretary of Defense [and] the Secretary of Commerce	October 16, 2018	October 19, 2018	83 FR 53157	2018–23050	
58	Promoting the Reliable Supply and Delivery of Water in the West	October 19, 2018	October 25, 2018	83 FR 53961	2018–23519	
59	Developing a Sustainable Spectrum Strategy for America's Future	October 25, 2018	October 30, 2018	83 FR 54513	2018–23839	
60	Delegation of Authority Under Section 3132(d) of the National Defense Authorization Act for Fiscal Year 2019	October 26, 2018	October 31, 2018	83 FR 54841	2018–23973	
61	Delegation of Authority Under Section 1069 of the National Defense Authorization Act for Fiscal Year 2019	October 26, 2018	October 31, 2018	83 FR 54839	2018–23971	
62	Delegation of Authorities Under Section 1294 of the National Defense Authorization Act for Fiscal Year 2019	October 26, 2018	November 16, 2018	83 FR 57671	2018–25156	
63	Delegation of Authority Under Section 1244 of the National Defense Authorization Act for Fiscal Year 2019	October 29, 2018	November 13, 2018	83 FR 56697	2018–24897	
64	Delegation of Authority Contained in Condition 23 of the Resolution of Advice and Consent to Ratification of the Chemical Weapons Convention	November 5, 2018	December 4, 2018	83 FR 62678	2018–26528	
65	Delegation of Authorities Under Section 1757 of the National Defense Authorization Act for Fiscal Year 2019	November 26, 2018	November 29, 2018	83 FR 61503	2018–26153	
66	Delegation of Authority Under Section 614(a)(1) of the Foreign Assistance Act of 1961	November 29, 2018	December 20, 2018	83 FR 65278	2018–27694	
67	Establishment of United States Space Command as a Unified Combatant Command	December 18, 2018	December 21, 2018	83 FR 65483	2018–27953	
68	Delegation of Functions and Authorities Under Section 1245 of the National Defense Authorization Act for Fiscal Year 2019	December 21, 2018	February 13, 2019	84 FR 3959	2019–02456	
69	Delegation of Functions and Authorities Under Section 1238 of the FAA Reauthorization Act of 2018	December 21, 2018	February 13, 2019	84 FR 3957	2019–02455	

==== 2019 ====
No.	Title / Description	Date signed	Date published	FR Citation	FR Doc. Number	Ref.
70	Decision on the United States Consulate General in Jerusalem	January 8, 2019	February 13, 2019	84 FR 3961	2019–02461	
71	Delegation of Authorities and Responsibilities Under Section 1763 of the National Defense Authorization Act for Fiscal Year 2019	January 15, 2019	January 22, 2019	84 FR 197	2019–00093	
72	Delegation of Functions and Authorities Under the Hizballah International Financing Prevention Act of 2015, as Amended, and the Hizballah International Financing Prevention Amendments Act of 2018	January 15, 2019	February 13, 2019	84 FR 3963	2019–02467	
73	Federal Housing Finance Reform	March 27, 2019	April 1, 2019	84 FR 12479	2019–06441	
74	Extension of Deferred Enforced Departure for Liberians	March 28, 2019	April 2, 2019	84 FR 12867	2019–06556	
75	Delaying Submission of the Small Business Report Under the Trade Facilitation and Trade Enforcement Act of 2015	April 1, 2019	April 4, 2019	84 FR 13467	2019–06811	
76	Combating High Nonimmigrant Overstay Rates	April 22, 2019	May 7, 2019	84 FR 19853	2019–09470	
77	Delegation of Authority Under Section 5 of the United States-Caribbean Strategic Engagement Act of 2016	April 30, 2019	May 17, 2019	84 FR 22329	2019–10480	
78	Agency Cooperation With Attorney General's Review of Intelligence Activities Relating to the 2016 Presidential Campaigns	May 23, 2019	May 29, 2019	84 FR 24971	2019–11369	
79	Revisions to the 2017 Unified Command Plan	May 24, 2019	May 30, 2019	84 FR 24977	2019–11420	
80	Delegation of Function Under the Hizballah International Financing Prevention Act of 2015, as Amended	May 24, 2019	May 30, 2019	84 FR 24975	2019–11416	
81	Delegation of Functions and Authorities Under the Sanctioning the Use of Civilians as Defenseless Shields Act	May 24, 2019	June 13, 2019	84 FR 27697	2019–12696	
82	Delegation of Functions and Authorities Under the Nicaragua Human Rights and Anticorruption Act of 2018	May 24, 2019	June 13, 2019	84 FR 27695	2019–12695	
83	Policy for Military Service Academy and Reserve Officers' Training Corps Graduates Seeking to Participate in Professional Sports	June 26, 2019	July 1, 2019	84 FR 31457	2019–14194	
84	Reforming Developing-Country Status in the World Trade Organization	July 26, 2019	July 31, 2019	84 FR 37555	2019–16497	
85	Delegation of Authority Under the Asia Reassurance Initiative Act of 2018	July 19, 2019	August 5, 2019	84 FR 37955	2019–16863	
86	Discharging the Federal Student Loan Debt of Totally and Permanently Disabled Veterans Initiative Act of 2018	August 21, 2019	August 26, 2019	84 FR 44677	2019–18520	
87	Providing an Order of Secession Within the Council on Environmental Quality	September 6, 2019	September 12, 2019	84 FR 48227	2019–19930	
88	Delegation of Functions and Authorities Under the Better Utilization of Investments Leading to Development Act of 2018	September 24, 2019	October 1, 2019	84 FR 52353	2019–21504	
89	Executive Orders 13836, 13837, and 13839	October 11, 2019	October 21, 2019	84 FR 56095	2019–23021	
90	Delegation of Removal Authority Over the Federal Service Impasses Panel	November 12, 2019	November 18, 2019	84 FR 63789	2019–25118	
91	Ocean Mapping of the United States Exclusive Economic Zone and the Shoreline and Nearshore of Alaska	November 19, 2019	November 22, 2019	84 FR 64699	2019–25618	

==== 2020 ====
No.	Title / Description	Date signed	Date published	FR Citation	FR Doc. Number	Ref.
92	Delegation of Certain Authority Under the Federal Service Labor-Management Relations Statute	January 29, 2020	February 21, 2020	85 FR 10033	2020–03578	
93	Developing and Delivering More Water Supplies to California	February 19, 2020	February 26, 2020	85 FR 11273	2020–04089	
94	Delegation of Certain Functions and Authorities Under the National Defense Authorization Act for Fiscal Year 2020	February 21, 2020	March 9, 2020	85 FR 13717	2020–04926	
95	Delegation of Authority to Re-establish the Presidential Advisory Council on Combating Antibiotic- Resistant Bacteria	March 3, 2020	March 6, 2020	85 FR 13469	2020–04809	
96	Making General Use Respirators Available	March 11, 2020	March 16, 2020	85 FR 15049	2020–05580	
97	Expanding State-Approved Diagnostic Tests	March 13, 2020	March 18, 2020	85 FR 15335	2020–05793	
98	Delegation of Functions Under 31 U.S.C. 5302	March 20, 2020	March 25, 2020	85 FR 16995	2020–06398	
99	Delegation of Certain Functions and Authorities Under the National Defense Authorization Act for Fiscal Year 2020	March 21, 2020	April 22, 2020	85 FR 22343	2020–08643	
100	Providing Federal Support for Governors' Use of the National Guard To Respond to COVID-19	March 22, 2020	March 26, 2020	85 FR 16997	2020–06476	
101	Providing Federal Support for Governors' Use of the National Guard To Respond to COVID-19	March 28, 2020	April 1, 2020	85 FR 18409	2020–06987	
102	Providing Federal Support for Governors' Use of the National Guard To Respond to COVID-19	March 30, 2020	April 1, 2020	85 FR 18411	2020–06989	
103	Extending the Wind-Down Period for Deferred Enforced Departure for Liberians	March 30, 2020	April 2, 2020	85 FR 18849	2020–07092	
104	Providing Federal Support for Governors' Use of the National Guard To Respond to COVID-19	April 2, 2020	April 7, 2020	85 FR 19639	2020–07453	
105	Providing an Order of Succession Within the Pension Benefit Guaranty Corporation	April 2, 2020	April 7, 2020	85 FR 19637	2020–07452	
106	Providing Federal Support for Governors' Use of the National Guard To Respond to COVID-19	April 7, 2020	April 10, 2020	85 FR 20383	2020–07801	
107	Authorizing the Exercise of Authority Under Public Law 85-804	April 10, 2020	April 17, 2020	85 FR 21735	2020–08394	
108	Providing Federal Support for Governors' Use of the National Guard To Respond to COVID-19	April 13, 2020	April 17, 2020	85 FR 21737	2020–08397	
109	Delegation of Authorities Under the National Defense Authorization Act for Fiscal Year 2020 and the Eastern Mediterranean Security and Energy Partnership Act of 2019	April 14, 2020	June 12, 2020	85 FR 35797	2020–12859	
110	Providing Continued Federal Support for Governors' Use of the National Guard To Respond to COVID-19 and To Facilitate Economic Recovery	April 20, 2020	April 24, 2020	85 FR 23203	2020–08958	
111	Providing Continued Federal Support for Governors' Use of the National Guard To Respond to COVID-19 and To Facilitate Economic Recovery	April 28, 2020	May 1, 2020	85 FR 26317	2020–09540	
112	Providing Continued Federal Support for Governors' Use of the National Guard To Respond to COVID-19 and To Facilitate Economic Recovery	May 8, 2020	May 13, 2020	85 FR 28839	2020–10437	
113	Delegation of Functions and Authorities Under Section 1260J of the National Defense Authorization Act for Fiscal Year 2020	May 12, 2020	May 18, 2020	85 FR 29591	2020–10749	
114	Providing Continued Federal Support for Governors' Use of the National Guard To Respond to COVID-19 and To Facilitate Economic Recovery	May 20, 2020	May 26, 2020	85 FR 31665	2020–11427	
115	Providing Continued Federal Support for Governors' Use of the National Guard To Respond to COVID-19 and To Facilitate Economic Recovery	June 2, 2020	June 5, 2020	85 FR 34955	2020–12431	
116	Protecting United States Investors From Significant Risks From Chinese Companies	June 4, 2020	June 9, 2020	85 FR 35171	2020–12585	
117	Delegation of Authority Under the Better Utilization of Investments Leading to Development Act of 2018	July 7, 2020	July 29, 2020	85 FR 45749	2020–16601	
118	Excluding Illegal Aliens From the Apportionment Base Following the 2020 Census	July 21, 2020	July 23, 2020	85 FR 44679	2020–16216	
119	Extension of the Use of the National Guard To Respond to COVID-19 and To Facilitate Economic Recovery	August 3, 2020	August 6, 2020	85 FR 47889	2020–17386	
120	Extension of the Use of the National Guard To Respond to COVID-19 and To Facilitate Economic Recovery	August 3, 2020	August 6, 2020	85 FR 47887	2020–17371	
121	Extension of the Use of the National Guard To Respond to COVID-19 and To Facilitate Economic Recovery	August 3, 2020	August 6, 2020	85 FR 47885	2020–17370	
122	Extension of the Use of the National Guard To Respond to COVID-19 and To Facilitate Economic Recovery	August 7, 2020	August 12, 2020	85 FR 49227	2020–17788	
123	Extension of the Use of the National Guard To Respond to COVID-19 and To Facilitate Economic Recovery	August 7, 2020	August 12, 2020	85 FR 49225	2020–17786	
124	Extension of the Use of the National Guard To Respond to COVID-19 and To Facilitate Economic Recovery	August 7, 2020	August 12, 2020	85 FR 49223	2020–17784	
125	Deferring Payroll Tax Obligations in Light of the Ongoing COVID-19 Disaster	August 8, 2020	August 13, 2020	85 FR 49587	2020–17899	
126	Continued Student Loan Payment Relief During the COVID-19 Pandemic	August 8, 2020	August 13, 2020	85 FR 49585	2020–17897	
127	Extension of the Use of the National Guard To Respond to COVID-19 and To Facilitate Economic Recovery	August 29, 2020	September 2, 2020	85 FR 54883	2020–19599	
128	Providing an Order of Succession Within the General Services Administration	September 2, 2020	September 8, 2020	85 FR 55585	2020–19963	
129	Delegation of Authority To Submit to the Congress the Notifications and Explanations Specified in the Resolution of Advice and Consent to Ratification of the Agreement Between the United States of America and the International Atomic Energy Agency for the Application of Safeguards in the United States of America	September 2, 2020	September 25, 2020	85 FR 60347	2020–21388	
130	Delegation of Certain Functions and Authorities Under the Global Fragility Act of 2019	September 4, 2020	September 25, 2020	85 FR 60349	2020–21389	
131	Delegation of Authority Under 15 U.S.C. 634c(b)(3)(B)	October 9, 2020	October 15, 2020	85 FR 65631	2020–23026	
132	Delegation of Authority Under Section 404(c) of the Child Soldiers Prevention Act of 2008	October 14, 2020	October 30, 2020	85 FR 68715	2020–24246	
133	Certification Pursuant to Section 6(e) of the Comprehensive Peace in Sudan Act of 2004, as Amended by the Darfur Peace and Accountability Act of 2006	October 26, 2020	November 6, 2020	85 FR 71213	2020–24901	
134	Protecting Jobs, Economic Opportunities, and National Security for All Americans by Ensuring Appropriate Support of Innovative Technologies for Using Our Domestic Natural Resources	October 31, 2020	November 4, 2020	85 FR 70039	2020–24601	
135	Delegation of Authority Under Section 506(a)(1) of the Foreign Assistance Act of 1961, as Amended	November 7, 2020	November 20, 2020	85 FR 74255	2020–25860	
136	Delegation of Authority for Fiscal Year 2021 Cost Estimates and Annual Reports to the Congress for the Land and Water Conservation Fund	November 9, 2020	November 13, 2020	85 FR 72889	2020–25295	
137	Extension of Governors' Use of the National Guard To Respond to COVID-19 and To Facilitate Economic Recovery	December 3, 2020	December 8, 2020	85 FR 78947	2020–27069	
138	Extension of Governors' Use of the National Guard To Respond to COVID-19 and To Facilitate Economic Recovery	December 3, 2020	December 8, 2020	85 FR 78945	2020–27068	
139	The National Space Policy	December 9, 2020	December 16, 2020	85 FR 81755	2020–27892	
140	Providing an Order of Succession Within the Office of Personnel Management	December 10, 2020	December 16, 2020	85 FR 81775	2020–27893	

==== 2021 ====
No.	Title / Description	Date signed	Date published	FR Citation	FR Doc. Number	Ref.
141	Providing an Order of Succession Within the United States International Development Finance Corporation	January 8, 2021	January 13, 2021	86 FR 2949	2021–00829	
142	Delegation of Authority Under Section 614(a)(2) of the Foreign Assistance Act of 1961	January 13, 2021	February 2, 2021	86 FR 7787	2021–02250	
143	Deferred Enforced Departure for Certain Venezuelans	January 19, 2021	January 25, 2021	86 FR 6845	2021–01718	
144	Declassification of Certain Materials Related to the FBI's Crossfire Hurricane Investigation	January 19, 2021	January 25, 2021	86 FR 6843	2021–01717	

=== Presidential determinations ===
==== FY2017 ====
Relative No.	Series No.	Title / Description	Date signed	Date published	FR Citation	FR Doc. Number	Ref.
1	2017–06	Presidential Determination Pursuant to Section 1245(d)(4)(B) and (C) of the National Defense Authorization Act for Fiscal Year 2012	May 17, 2017	June 22, 2017	82 FR 28391	2017–13199	
2	2017–07	Suspension of Limitations Under the Jerusalem Embassy Act	June 1, 2017	June 21, 2017	82 FR 28387	2017–13115	
3	2017–08	Presidential Determination Pursuant to Section 4533(a)(5) of the Defense Production Act of 1950	June 13, 2017	June 15, 2017	82 FR 27607	2017–12621	
4	2017–09	Presidential Determination Pursuant to Section 4533(a)(5) of the Defense Production Act of 1950	June 13, 2017	June 15, 2017	82 FR 27609	2017–12622	
5	2017–10	Continuation of U.S. Drug Interdiction Assistance to the Government of Colombia	July 21, 2017	August 28, 2017	82 FR 40667	2017–18291	
6	2017–11	Continuation of the Exercise of Certain Authorities Under the Trading With the Enemy Act	September 8, 2017	September 13, 2017	82 FR 42927	2017–19522	
7	2017–12	Presidential Determination on Major Drug Transit or Major Illicit Drug Producing Countries for Fiscal Year 2018	September 13, 2017	September 28, 2017	82 FR 45413	2017–21028	
8	2017–13	Presidential Determination on Refugee Admissions for Fiscal Year 2018	September 29, 2017	October 23, 2017	82 FR 49083	2017–23140	
9	2017–14	Presidential Determination With Respect to the Child Soldiers Prevention Act of 2008	September 30, 2017	October 23, 2017	82 FR 49085	2017–23145	
10	2017–15	Presidential Determination With Respect to the Efforts of Foreign Governments Regarding Trafficking in Persons	September 30, 2017	October 27, 2017	82 FR 50047	2017–23609	

==== FY2018 ====
Relative No.	Series No.	Title / Description	Date signed	Date published	FR Citation	FR Doc. Number	Ref.
11	2018–01	Presidential Determination Pursuant to Section 1245(d)(4)(B) and (C) of the National Defense Authorization Act for Fiscal Year 2012	November 15, 2017	December 15, 2017	82 FR 59503	2017–27181	
12	2018–02	Suspension of Limitations under the Jerusalem Embassy Act	December 6, 2017	December 26, 2017	82 FR 61127	2017–28027	
13	2018–03	Presidential Determination Pursuant to Section 4533(a)(5) of the Defense Production Act of 1950	January 23, 2018	January 25, 2018	83 FR 3533	2018–01552	
14	2018–04	Presidential Determination Pursuant to Section 4533(a)(5) of the Defense Production Act of 1950	January 23, 2018	January 25, 2018	83 FR 3535	2018–01554	
15	2018–05	Eligibility of the Organisation Conjointe de Cooperation en Matiere d'Armement To Receive Defense Articles and Defense Services Under the Foreign Assistance Act of 1961, as Amended, and the Arms Export Control Act, as Amended	April 20, 2018	May 8, 2018	83 FR 20707	2018–09882	
16	2018–06	Proposed Agreement Between the Government of the United States of America and the Government of the United Mexican States for Cooperation in Peaceful Uses of Nuclear Energy	April 30, 2018	May 8, 2018	83 FR 20709	2018–09883	
17	2018–07	Proposed Agreement Between the Government of the United States of America and the Government of the United Kingdom of Great Britain and Northern Ireland for Cooperation in Peaceful Uses of Nuclear Energy	April 30, 2018	May 8, 2018	83 FR 20711	2018–09885	
18	2018–08	Presidential Determination Pursuant to Section 1245(d)(4)(B) and (C) of the National Defense Authorization Act for Fiscal Year 2012	May 14, 2018	June 6, 2018	83 FR 26345	2018–12332	
19	2018–09	Suspension of Limitations Under the Jerusalem Embassy Act	June 4, 2018	July 3, 2018	83 FR 31323	2018–14487	
20	2018–10	Continuation of U.S. Drug Interdiction Assistance to the Government of Colombia	July 20, 2018	August 9, 2018	83 FR 39579	2018–17261	
21	2018–11	Continuation of the Exercise of Certain Authorities Under the Trading With the Enemy Act	September 10, 2018	September 12, 2018	83 FR 46347	2018–20014	
22	2018–12	Presidential Determination on Major Drug Transit or Major Illicit Drug Producing Countries for Fiscal Year 2019	September 11, 2018	October 4, 2018	83 FR 50239	2018–21806	
23	2018–13	Presidential Determination With Respect to the Child Soldiers Prevention Act of 2008	September 28, 2018	October 23, 2018	83 FR 53363	2018–23245	

==== FY2019 ====
Relative No.	Series No.	Title / Description	Date signed	Date published	FR Citation	FR Doc. Number	Ref.
24	2019–01	Presidential Determination on Refugee Admissions for Fiscal Year 2019	October 4, 2018	November 1, 2018	83 FR 55091	2018–24135	
25	2019–02	Presidential Determination Pursuant to Section 303 of the Defense Production Act of 1950, as Amended	October 5, 2018	October 11, 2018	83 FR 51617	2018–22338	
26	2019–03	Presidential Determination Pursuant to Section 303 of the Defense Production Act of 1950, as Amended	October 5, 2018	October 11, 2018	83 FR 51619	2018–22340	
27	2019–04	Presidential Determination Pursuant to Section 1245(d)(4)(B) and (C) of the National Defense Authorization Act for Fiscal Year 2012	October 31, 2018	November 16, 2018	83 FR 57673	2018–25157	
28	2019–05	Presidential Determination With Respect to the Efforts of Foreign Governments Regarding Trafficking in Persons	November 29, 2018	December 20, 2018	83 FR 65281	2018–27696	
29	2019–06	Suspension of Limitations Under the Jerusalem Embassy Act	December 7, 2018	December 27, 2018	83 FR 66555	2018–28364	
30	2019–07	Presidential Determination Pursuant to Section 303 of the Defense Production Act of 1950, as Amended	January 16, 2019	January 23, 2019	84 FR 201	2019–00097	
31	2019–08	Presidential Determination Pursuant to Section 303 of the Defense Production Act of 1950, as Amended	January 16, 2019	January 23, 2019	84 FR 203	2019–00098	
32	2019–09	Presidential Determination Pursuant to Section 303 of the Defense Production Act of 1950, as Amended	January 16, 2019	January 23, 2019	84 FR 205	2019–00099	
33	2019–10	Presidential Determination Pursuant to Section 303 of the Defense Production Act of 1950, as Amended	January 16, 2019	January 23, 2019	84 FR 207	2019–00100	
34	2019–11	Presidential Determination Pursuant to Section 303 of the Defense Production Act of 1950, as amended	March 12, 2019	March 15, 2019	84 FR 9691	2019–05100	
35	2019–12	Presidential Determination Pursuant to Section 1245(d)(4)(B) and (C) of the National Defense Authorization Act for Fiscal Year 2012	April 29, 2019	May 17, 2019	84 FR 22327	2019–10472	
36	2019–13	Presidential Determination Pursuant to Section 303 Defense Production Act of 1950, as Amended	June 10, 2019	June 13, 2019	84 FR 27701	2019–12698	
37	2019–14	Continuation of U.S. Drug Interdiction Assistance to the Government of Colombia	July 19, 2019	August 5, 2019	84 FR 38109	2019–16862	
38	2019–15	Presidential Determination Pursuant to Section 303 of the Defense Production Act of 1950, as Amended	July 22, 2019	July 25, 2019	84 FR 35965	2019–15994	
39	2019–16	Presidential Determination Pursuant to Section 303 of the Defense Production Act of 1950, as Amended	July 22, 2019	July 25, 2019	84 FR 35967	2019–15995	
40	2019–17	Presidential Determination Pursuant to Section 303 of the Defense Production Act of 1950, as Amended	July 22, 2019	July 25, 2019	84 FR 35969	2019–15998	
41	2019–18	Presidential Determination Pursuant to Section 303 of the Defense Production Act of 1950, as Amended	July 22, 2019	July 25, 2019	84 FR 35971	2019–15999	
42	2019–19	Presidential Determination Pursuant to Section 303 of the Defense Production Act of 1950, as Amended	July 22, 2019	July 25, 2019	84 FR 35973	2019–16001	
43	2019–20	Presidential Determination Pursuant to Section 303 of the Defense Production Act of 1950, as Amended	July 22, 2019	July 25, 2019	84 FR 35975	2019–16002	
44	2019–21	Designation of the Federative Republic of Brazil as a Major Non-NATO Ally	July 31, 2019	August 19, 2019	84 FR 43035	2019–17998	
45	2019–22	Presidential Determination on Major Drug Transit or Major Illicit Drug Producing Countries for Fiscal Year 2020	August 8, 2019	August 27, 2019	84 FR 44679	2019–18595	
46	2019–23	Continuation of the Exercise of Certain Authorities Under the Trading With the Enemy Act	September 13, 2019	September 18, 2019	84 FR 49189	2019–20366	

==== FY2020 ====
Relative No.	Series No.	Title / Description	Date signed	Date published	FR Citation	FR Doc. Number	Ref.
47	2020–01	Presidential Determination and Certification With Respect to the Child Soldiers Prevention Act of 2008	October 18, 2019	November 4, 2019	84 FR 59519	2019–24195	
48	2020–02	Presidential Determination With Respect to the Efforts of Foreign Governments Regarding Trafficking in Persons	October 18, 2019	November 4, 2019	84 FR 59521	2019–24196	
49	2020–03	Presidential Determination Pursuant to Section 1245(d)(4)(B) and (C) of the National Defense Authorization Act for Fiscal Year 2012	October 25, 2019	November 7, 2019	84 FR 59917	2019–24425	
50	2020–04	Presidential Determination on Refugee Admissions for Fiscal Year 2020	November 1, 2019	November 29, 2019	84 FR 65903	2019–26082	
51	2020–05	Presidential Determination on Waiving a Restriction on United States Assistance to Bolivia Under Section 706 of the Foreign Relations Authorization Act, Fiscal Year 2003	January 6, 2020	February 6, 2020	85 FR 6731	2020–02473	
52	2020–06	Presidential Determination Pursuant to Section 1245(d)(4)(B) and (C) of the National Defense Authorization Act for Fiscal Year 2012	June 5, 2020	June 19, 2020	85 FR 36995	2020–13389	
53	2020–07	Presidential Determination Pursuant to Section 303 of the Defense Production Act of 1950, as Amended	June 24, 2020	June 29, 2020	85 FR 38747	2020–14090	
54	2020–09	Continuation of U.S. Drug Interdiction Assistance to the Government of Colombia	July 17, 2020	July 29, 2020	85 FR 45751	2020–16622	
55	2020–10	Continuation of the Exercise of Certain Authorities Under the Trading With the Enemy Act	September 9, 2020	September 14, 2020	85 FR 57075	2020–20377	
56	2020–11	Presidential Determination on Major Drug Transit or Major Illicit Drug Producing Countries for Fiscal Year 2021	September 16, 2020	September 25, 2020	85 FR 60351	2020–21390	
57	2020–12	Presidential Determination With Respect to the Efforts of Foreign Governments Regarding Trafficking in Persons	September 28, 2020	November 6, 2020	85 FR 71209	2020–24894	

==== FY2021 ====
Relative No.	Series No.	Title / Description	Date signed	Date published	FR Citation	FR Doc. Number	Ref.
58	2021–01	Presidential Determination and Certification With Respect to the Child Soldiers Prevention Act of 2008	October 14, 2020	October 30, 2020	85 FR 69117	2020–24292	
59	2021–02	Presidential Determination on Refugee Admissions for Fiscal Year 2021	October 27, 2020	November 6, 2020	85 FR 71219	2020–24912	
60	2021–03	Presidential Determination on the Pursuant to Section 1245(d)(4)(B) and (C) of the National Defense Authorization Act for FY 2012	January 14, 2021	February 2, 2021	86 FR 7789	2021–02251	

=== Administrative orders ===
No.	Title / Description	Date signed	Date published	FR Citation	FR Doc. Number	Ref.
1	Order Regarding the Proposed Acquisition of Lattice Semiconductor Corporation by China Venture Capital Fund Corporation Limited	September 13, 2017	September 18, 2017	82 FR 43665	2017–20005	

=== Presidential notices ===
==== 2017 ====
Relative No.	Original EO or PR No.	Title / Description	Date signed	Date published	FR Citation	FR Doc. Number	Ref.
1	EO 13664	Continuation of the National Emergency With Respect to South Sudan (Note: Continues: EO 13664, of April 3, 2014.)	March 23, 2017	March 24, 2017	82 FR 15107	2017–06075	
2	EO 13694	Continuation of the National Emergency with Respect to Significant Malicious Cyber-Enabled Activities (Note: Continues: EO 13694, of December 28, 2016.)	March 29, 2017	March 31, 2017	82 FR 16099	2017–06583	
3	EO 13536	Continuation of the National Emergency with Respect to Somalia (Note: Continues: EO 13536, of April 12, 2010.)	April 6, 2017	April 7, 2017	82 FR 17095	2017–07238	
4	EO 13611	Continuation of the National Emergency with Respect to Yemen (Note: Continues: EO 13611, of May 16, 2012.)	May 9, 2017	May 10, 2017	82 FR 21905	2017–09635	
5	EO 13338	Continuation of the National Emergency with Respect to the Actions of the Government of Syria (Note: Continues: EO 13338, of May 11, 2004.)	May 9, 2017	May 10, 2017	82 FR 21909	2017–09653	
6	EO 13667	Continuation of the National Emergency With Respect to the Central African Republic (Note: Continues: EO 13667, of May 12, 2014.)	May 9, 2017	May 10, 2017	82 FR 21911	2017–09656	
7	EO 13303	Continuation of the National Emergency With Respect to the Stabilization of Iraq (Note: Continues: EO 13303, of May 22, 2003.)	May 16, 2017	May 18, 2017	82 FR 22877	2017–10317	
8	EO 13405	Continuation of the National Emergency With Respect to the Actions and Policies of Certain Members of the Government of Belarus and Other Persons to Undermine Democratic Processes or Institutions of Belarus (Note: Continues: EO 13405, of June 16, 2006.)	June 13, 2017	June 15, 2017	82 FR 27605	2017–12618	
9	EO 13466	Continuation of the National Emergency With Respect to North Korea (Note: Continues: EO 13466, of June 26, 2008; Expanded in scope in EO 13551 of August 30, 2010; Addressed further in EO 13570 of April 18, 2011; Further expanded in scope in EO 13687 of January 2, 2015; Under which additional steps were taken in EO 13722 of March 15, 2016.)	June 21, 2017	June 23, 2017	82 FR 28743	2017–13376	
10	EO 13219	Continuation of the National Emergency with Respect to the Western Balkans (Note: Continues: EO 13219 of June 26, 2001.)	June 21, 2017	June 23, 2017	82 FR 28745	2017–13377	
11	EO 13581	Continuation of the National Emergency with Respect to Transnational Criminal Organizations (Note: Continues: EO 13581 of July 25, 2011.)	July 19, 2017	July 20, 2017	82 FR 33773	2017–15461	
12	EO 13581	Second Continuation of the National Emergency with Respect to Transnational Criminal Organizations (Note: Revokes: Notice 11 of July 19, 2017; Continues: EO 13581 of July 25, 2011.)	July 20, 2017	July 21, 2017	82 FR 34249	2017–15592	
13	EO 13441	Continuation of the National Emergency with Respect to Lebanon (Note: Continues: EO 13341 of August 1, 2007.)	July 29, 2017	July 31, 2017	82 FR 35621	2017–16263	
14	EO 13222	Continuation of the National Emergency With Respect to Export Control Regulations (Note: Continues: EO 13222 of August 17, 2001; Amended by EO 13637 of March 8, 2013.)	August 15, 2017	August 16, 2017	82 FR 39005	2017–17486	
15	PR 7463	Continuation of the National Emergency with Respect to Certain Terrorist Attacks (Note: Continues: Proclamation 7463 of September 14, 2001.)	September 11, 2017	September 13, 2017	82 FR 43153	2017–19601	
16	EO 13224	Continuation of the National Emergency With Respect to Persons Who Commit, Threaten To Commit, or Support Terrorism^{31}	September 18, 2017	September 19, 2017	82 FR 43825	2017–20127	
17	EO 12978	Continuation of the National Emergency with Respect to Significant Narcotics Traffickers Centered in Colombia^{37}	October 16, 2017	October 18, 2017	82 FR 48607	2017–22765	
18	EO 13413	Continuation of the National Emergency with Respect to the Democratic Republic of the Congo^{41}	October 23, 2017	October 25, 2017	82 FR 49275	2017–23324	
19	EO 13067	Continuation of the National Emergency with Respect to Sudan (Note: Amends: EO 13067 of November 3, 1997; EO 13412 of October 13, 2006; and EO 13761 of January 13, 2017.) ^{43}	October 31, 2017	November 2, 2017	82 FR 50799	2017–24016	
20	EO 12170	Continuation of the National Emergency with Respect to Iran^{43}	November 6, 2017	November 8, 2017	82 FR 51969	2017–24465	
21	EO 13712	Continuation of the National Emergency With Respect to Burundi^{44}	November 6, 2017	November 8, 2017	82 FR 51967	2017–24464	
22	EO 12938	Continuation of the National Emergency with Respect to the Proliferation of Weapons of Mass Destruction^{46}	November 6, 2017	November 8, 2017	82 FR 51971	2017–24466	

==== 2018 ====
Relative No.	Original EO or PR No.	Title / Description	Date signed	Date published	FR Citation	FR Doc. Number	Ref.
23	EO 12947	Continuation of the National Emergency With Respect to Terrorists Who Threaten To Disrupt the Middle East Peace Process	January 17, 2018	January 18, 2018	83 FR 2731	2018–01024	
24	EO 13566	Continuation of the National Emergency With Respect to Libya	February 9, 2018	February 12, 2018	83 FR 6105	2018–03004	
25	EO 13660	Continuation of the National Emergency With Respect to Ukraine	March 2, 2018	March 5, 2018	83 FR 9413	2018–04626	
26	EO 13692	Continuation of the National Emergency With Respect to Venezuela	March 2, 2018	March 5, 2018	83 FR 9415	2018–04627	
27	EO 13288	Continuation of the National Emergency With Respect to Zimbabwe	March 2, 2018	March 5, 2018	83 FR 9417	2018–04628	
28	EO 12957	Continuation of the National Emergency With Respect to Iran	March 12, 2018	March 14, 2018	83 FR 11393	2018–05340	
29	EO 13694	Continuation of the National Emergency With Respect to Significant Malicious Cyber-Enabled Activities	March 27, 2018	March 28, 2018	83 FR 13371	2018–06468	
30	EO 13664	Continuation of the National Emergency With Respect to South Sudan	March 27, 2018	March 28, 2018	83 FR 13373	2018–06475	
31	EO 13536	Continuation of the National Emergency With Respect to Somalia	April 4, 2018	April 5, 2018	83 FR 14731	2018–07177	
32	EO 13338	Continuation of the National Emergency With Respect to the Actions of the Government of Syria	May 9, 2018	May 10, 2018	83 FR 21839	2018–10199	
33	EO 13667	Continuation of the National Emergency With Respect to the Central African Republic	May 10, 2018	May 11, 2018	83 FR 22175	2018–10313	
34	EO 13611	Continuation of the National Emergency With Respect to Yemen	May 14, 2018	May 15, 2018	83 FR 22585	2018–10534	
35	EO 13303	Continuation of the National Emergency With Respect to the Stabilization of Iraq	May 18, 2018	May 21, 2018	83 FR 23573	2018–11015	
36	EO 13405	Continuation of the National Emergency With Respect to the Actions and Policies of Certain Members of the Government of Belarus and Other Persons To Undermine Democratic Processes or Institutions of Belarus	June 8, 2018	June 12, 2018	83 FR 27287	2018–12719	
37	EO 13466	Continuation of the National Emergency With Respect to North Korea	June 22, 2018	June 25, 2018	83 FR 29661	2018–13801	
38	EO 13219	Continuation of the National Emergency With Respect to the Western Balkans	June 22, 2018	June 25, 2018	83 FR 29663	2018–13805	
39	EO 13581	Continuation of the National Emergency With Respect to Transnational Criminal Organizations	July 20, 2018	July 23, 2018	83 FR 34931	2018–15904	
40	EO 13441	Continuation of the National Emergency With Respect to Lebanon	July 27, 2018	July 31, 2018	83 FR 37415	2018–16550	
41	EO 13222	Continuation of the National Emergency With Respect to Export Control Regulations	August 8, 2018	August 13, 2018	83 FR 39871	2018–17465	
42	—N/a	Notice of Intention To Enter Into a Trade Agreement	August 31, 2018	September 5, 2018	83 FR 45191	2018–19411	
43	PR 7463	Continuation of the National Emergency With Respect to Certain Terrorist Attacks	September 10, 2018	September 12, 2018	83 FR 46067	2018–19945	
44	EO 13224	Continuation of the National Emergency With Respect to Persons Who Commit, Threaten To Commit, or Support Terrorism	September 19, 2018	September 20, 2018	83 FR 47799	2018–20703	
45	EO 12978	Continuation of the National Emergency With Respect to Significant Narcotics Traffickers Centered in Colombia	October 17, 2018	October 18, 2018	83 FR 52941	2018–22962	
46	EO 13413	Continuation of the National Emergency With Respect to the Democratic Republic of the Congo	October 25, 2018	October 26, 2018	83 FR 54227	2018–23657	
47	EO 13067	Continuation of the National Emergency With Respect to Sudan	October 31, 2018	November 2, 2018	83 FR 55239	2018–24244	
48	EO 12170	Continuation of the National Emergency With Respect to Iran	November 8, 2018	November 9, 2018	83 FR 56251	2018–24808	
49	EO 12938	Continuation of the National Emergency With Respect to the Proliferation of Weapons of Mass Destruction	November 8, 2018	November 9, 2018	83 FR 56253	2018–24810	
50	EO 13712	Continuation of the National Emergency With Respect to Burundi	November 16, 2018	November 19, 2018	83 FR 58461	2018–25390	
51	EO 13818	Continuation of the National Emergency With Respect to Serious Human Rights Abuse and Corruption	December 18, 2018	December 19, 2018	83 FR 65277	2018–27660	

==== 2019 ====
Relative No.	Original EO or PR No.	Title / Description	Date signed	Date published	FR Citation	FR Doc. Number	Ref.
52	EO 12947	Continuation of the National Emergency With Respect to Terrorists Who Threaten To Disrupt the Middle East Peace Process	January 16, 2019	January 18, 2019	84 FR 127	2019–00079	
53	PR 9699	Continuation of the National Emergency With Respect to Cuba and Continuing To Authorize the Regulation of the Anchorage and Movement of Vessels	February 19, 2019	February 21, 2019	84 FR 5579	2019–03177	
54	EO 13566	Continuation of the National Emergency With Respect to Libya	February 19, 2019	February 21, 2019	84 FR 5581	2019–03178	
55	EO 13660	Continuation of the National Emergency With Respect to Ukraine	March 4, 2019	March 5, 2019	84 FR 7975	2019–04120	
56	EO 13288	Continuation of the National Emergency With Respect to Zimbabwe	March 4, 2019	March 5, 2019	84 FR 7977	2019–04124	
57	EO 13692	Continuation of the National Emergency With Respect to Venezuela	March 5, 2019	March 7, 2019	84 FR 8245	2019–04253	
58	EO 12957	Continuation of the National Emergency With Respect to Iran	March 12, 2019	March 13, 2019	84 FR 9219	2019–04872	
59	EO 13694	Continuation of the National Emergency With Respect to Significant Malicious Cyber-Enabled Activities	March 26, 2019	March 28, 2019	84 FR 11877	2019–06200	
60	EO 13664	Continuation of the National Emergency With Respect to South Sudan	April 1, 2019	April 2, 2019	84 FR 12871	2019–06580	
61	EO 13536	Continuation of the National Emergency With Respect to Somalia	April 10, 2019	April 11, 2019	84 FR 14843	2019–07414	
62	EO 13338	Continuation of the National Emergency With Respect to the Actions of the Government of Syria	May 8, 2019	May 10, 2019	84 FR 20537	2019–09814	
63	EO 13667	Continuation of the National Emergency With Respect to the Central African Republic	May 8, 2019	May 10, 2019	84 FR 20539	2019–09822	
64	EO 13611	Continuation of the National Emergency With Respect to Yemen	May 13, 2019	May 15, 2019	84 FR 22047	2019–10264	
65	EO 13303	Continuation of the National Emergency With Respect to the Stabilization of Iraq	May 20, 2019	May 21, 2019	84 FR 23437	2019–10777	
66	EO 13405	Continuation of the National Emergency With Respect to the Actions and Policies of Certain Members of the Government of Belarus and Other Persons To Undermine Democratic Processes or Institutions of Belarus	June 13, 2019	June 14, 2019	84 FR 27905	2019–12826	
67	EO 13219	Continuation of the National Emergency With Respect to the Western Balkans	June 18, 2019	June 20, 2019	84 FR 28715	2019–13258	
68	EO 13466	Continuation of the National Emergency With Respect to North Korea	June 21, 2019	June 24, 2019	84 FR 29793	2019–13596	
69	EO 13581	Continuation of the National Emergency With Respect to Transnational Criminal Organizations	July 22, 2019	July 23, 2019	84 FR 35513	2019–15794	
70	EO 13441	Continuation of the National Emergency With Respect to Lebanon	July 30, 2019	July 31, 2019	84 FR 37561	2019–16519	
71	EO 13222	Continuation of the National Emergency With Respect to Export Control Regulations	August 14, 2019	August 15, 2019	84 FR 41881	2019–17735	
72	EO 13848	Continuation of the National Emergency With Respect to Foreign Interference in or Undermining Public Confidence in United States Elections	September 10, 2019	September 11, 2019	84 FR 48039	2019–19849	
73	PR 7463	Continuation of the National Emergency With Respect to Certain Terrorist Attacks	September 12, 2019	September 13, 2019	84 FR 48545	2019–20070	
74	EO 13224	Continuation of the National Emergency With Respect to Persons Who Commit, Threaten to Commit, or Support Terrorism	September 19, 2019	September 20, 2019	84 FR 49633	2019–20652	
75	EO 12978	Continuation of the National Emergency With Respect to Significant Narcotics Traffickers Centered in Colombia	October 15, 2019	October 17, 2019	84 FR 55857	2019–22852	
76	EO 13413	Continuation of the National Emergency With Respect to the Democratic Republic of the Congo	October 22, 2019	October 23, 2019	84 FR 56927	2019–23323	
77	EO 13067	Continuation of the National Emergency With Respect to Sudan	October 31, 2019	November 1, 2019	84 FR 59287	2019–24109	
78	EO 12170	Continuation of the National Emergency With Respect to Iran	November 12, 2019	November 13, 2019	84 FR 61815	2019–24806	
79	EO 12938	Continuation of the National Emergency With Respect to the Proliferation of Weapons of Mass Destruction	November 12, 2019	November 13, 2019	84 FR 61817	2019–24809	
80	EO 13712	Continuation of the National Emergency With Respect to Burundi	November 19, 2019	November 20, 2019	84 FR 64191	2019–25373	
81	EO 13851	Continuation of the National Emergency With Respect to the Situation in Nicaragua	November 25, 2019	November 26, 2019	84 FR 65255	2019–25865	
82	EO 13818	Continuation of the National Emergency With Respect to Serious Human Rights Abuse and Corruption	December 18, 2019	December 19, 2019	84 FR 69981	2019–27618	

==== 2020 ====
Relative No.	Original EO or PR No.	Title / Description	Date signed	Date published	FR Citation	FR Doc. Number	Ref.
83	PR 9844	Continuation of the National Emergency With Respect to the Southern Border of the United States	February 13, 2020	February 14, 2020	85 FR 8715	2020–03212	
84	EO 13566	Continuation of the National Emergency With Respect to Libya	February 20, 2020	February 24, 2020	85 FR 10553	2020–03810	
85	PR 6867	Continuation of the National Emergency With Respect to Cuba and of the Emergency Authority Relating to the Regulation of the Anchorage and Movement of Vessels	February 25, 2020	February 27, 2020	85 FR 11825	2020–04190	
86	EO 13660	Continuation of the National Emergency With Respect to Ukraine	February 25, 2020	February 27, 2020	85 FR 11827	2020–04192	
87	EO 13288	Continuation of the National Emergency With Respect to Zimbabwe	March 4, 2020	March 5, 2020	85 FR 12981	2020–04743	
88	EO 13692	Continuation of the National Emergency With Respect to Venezuela	March 5, 2020	March 6, 2020	85 FR 13473	2020–04822	
89	EO 12957	Continuation of the National Emergency With Respect to Iran	March 12, 2020	March 13, 2020	85 FR 14731	2020–05466	
90	EO 13694	Continuation of the National Emergency With Respect to Significant Malicious Cyber-Enabled Activities	March 30, 2020	March 31, 2020	85 FR 18103	2020–06892	
91	EO 13664	Continuation of the National Emergency With Respect to South Sudan	April 1, 2020	April 2, 2020	85 FR 18855	2020–07126	
92	EO 13536	Continuation of the National Emergency With Respect to Somalia	April 3, 2020	April 6, 2020	85 FR 19373	2020–07373	
93	EO 13338	Continuation of the National Emergency With Respect to the Actions of the Government of Syria	May 7, 2020	May 8, 2020	85 FR 27639	2020–10092	
94	EO 13667	Continuation of the National Emergency With Respect to the Central African Republic	May 7, 2020	May 8, 2020	85 FR 27641	2020–10093	
95	EO 13611	Continuation of the National Emergency With Respect to Yemen	May 7, 2020	May 8, 2020	85 FR 27643	2020–10094	
96	EO 13873	Continuation of the National Emergency With Respect to Securing the Information and Communications Technology and Services Supply Chain	May 13, 2020	May 14, 2020	85 FR 29321	2020–10594	
97	EO 13303	Continuation of the National Emergency With Respect to the Stabilization of Iraq	May 20, 2020	May 21, 2020	85 FR 31033	2020–11217	
98	EO 13405	Continuation of the National Emergency With Respect to the Actions and Policies of Certain Members of the Government of Belarus and Other Persons To Undermine Democratic Processes or Institutions of Belarus	June 11, 2020	June 12, 2020	85 FR 36137	2020–12949	
99	EO 13466	Continuation of the National Emergency With Respect to North Korea	June 17, 2020	June 19, 2020	85 FR 37329	2020–13450	
100	EO 13219	Continuation of the National Emergency With Respect to the Western Balkans	June 24, 2020	June 25, 2020	85 FR 38271	2020–13943	
101	EO 13581	Continuation of the National Emergency With Respect to Transnational Criminal Organizations	July 22, 2020	July 23, 2020	85 FR 44683	2020–16223	
102	EO 13882	Continuation of the National Emergency With Respect to Mali	July 23, 2020	July 24, 2020	85 FR 45055	2020–16312	
103	EO 13441	Continuation of the National Emergency With Respect to Lebanon	July 29, 2020	July 30, 2020	85 FR 45965	2020–16816	
104	EO 13222	Continuation of the National Emergency With Respect to Export Control Regulations	August 13, 2020	August 14, 2020	85 FR 49939	2020–18016	
105	PR 7463	Continuation of the National Emergency With Respect to Certain Terrorist Attacks	September 10, 2020	September 11, 2020	85 FR 56467	2020–20312	
106	EO 13848	Continuation of the National Emergency With Respect to Foreign Interference in or Undermining Public Confidence in the United States Elections	September 10, 2020	September 11, 2020	85 FR 56469	2020–20315	
107	EO 13224	Continuation of the National Emergency With Respect to Persons Who Commit, Threaten To Commit, or Support Terrorism	September 18, 2020	September 22, 2020	85 FR 59641	2020–21059	
108	EO 13894	Continuation of the National Emergency With Respect to the Situation in and in Relation to Syria	October 8, 2020	October 13, 2020	85 FR 64941	2020–22769	
109	EO 12978	Continuation of the National Emergency With Respect to Significant Narcotics Traffickers Centered in Colombia	October 19, 2020	October 20, 2020	85 FR 66871	2020–23414	
110	EO 13413	Continuation of the National Emergency With Respect to the Democratic Republic of the Congo	October 23, 2020	October 26, 2020	85 FR 67963	2020–23853	
111	EO 13067	Continuation of the National Emergency With Respect to Sudan	October 30, 2020	November 2, 2020	85 FR 69463	2020–24429	
112	EO 13712	Continuation of the National Emergency With Respect to Burundi	November 12, 2020	November 13, 2020	85 FR 72893	2020–25309	
113	EO 12170	Continuation of the National Emergency With Respect to Iran	November 12, 2020	November 13, 2020	85 FR 72895	2020–25310	
114	EO 12938	Continuation of the National Emergency With Respect to the Proliferation of Weapons of Mass Destruction	November 12, 2020	November 13, 2020	85 FR 72897	2020–25311	
115	EO 13851	Continuation of the National Emergency With Respect to the Situation in Nicaragua	November 24, 2020	November 25, 2020	85 FR 75831	2020–26320	
116	EO 13818	Continuation of the National Emergency With Respect to Serious Human Rights Abuse and Corruption	December 16, 2020	December 18, 2020	85 FR 82869	2020–28154	

==== 2021 ====
Relative No.	Original EO or PR No.	Title / Description	Date signed	Date published	FR Citation	FR Doc. Number	Ref.
117	PR 9844	Continuation of the National Emergency With Respect to the Southern Border of the United States	January 15, 2021	January 22, 2021	86 FR 6557	2021–01566	

=== Presidential sequestration orders ===
No.	Title / Description	Date signed	Date published	FR Citation	FR Doc. Number	Ref.
1	Sequestration Order for Fiscal Year 2018 Pursuant to Section 251A of the Balanced Budget and Emergency Deficit Control Act, as Amended	May 23, 2017	May 26, 2017	82 FR 24209	2017–11076	
2	Sequestration Order for Fiscal Year 2019 Pursuant to Section 251A of the Balanced Budget and Emergency Deficit Control Act, as Amended	February 12, 2018	February 15, 2018	83 FR 6789	2018–03271	
3	Sequestration Order for Fiscal Year 2020 Pursuant To Section 251A of the Balanced Budget and Emergency Deficit Control Act, as Amended	March 18, 2019	March 21, 2019	84 FR 10401	2019–05547	
4	Sequestration Order for Fiscal Year 2021 Pursuant to Section 251A of the Balanced Budget and Emergency Deficit Control Act, as Amended	February 10, 2020	February 13, 2020	85 FR 8129	2020–03044	

=== National security presidential memoranda ===
No.	Title / Description	Date signed	Date published	FR Citation	FR Doc. Number	Ref.
1	Regarding Rebuilding the U.S. Armed Forces	January 27, 2017	February 1, 2017	82 FR 8983	2017–02282	
2	Regarding the Organization of the National Security Council and the Homeland Security Council (Note: Revokes: Presidential Memorandum 10 of January 28, 2017.)	January 28, 2017	February 2, 2017	82 FR 9119	2017–02381	
3	Regarding the Plan to Defeat the Islamic State of Iraq and Syria	January 28, 2017	February 2, 2017	82 FR 9125	2017–02386	
4	Regarding the Organization of the National Security Council, the Homeland Security Council, and Subcommittees	April 4, 2017	April 6, 2017	82 FR 16881	2017–07064	
5	Regarding the Strengthening the Policy of the United States Toward Cuba	June 16, 2017	October 20, 2017	82 FR 48875	2017–22928	
6	Regarding the Elevation of U.S. Cyber Command to a Unified Combatant Command	August 18, 2017	August 23, 2017	82 FR 39953	2017–17947	
7	Regarding the Integration, Sharing, and Use of National Security Threat Actor Information to Protect Americans	October 5, 2017	TBA	TBA	TBA	

=== Discrepancies between White House versions and Federal Register versions ===
In February 2017, a review of presidential documents by USA Today showed that the White House posted inaccurate texts of Trump's executive orders on its website, conflicting with the official versions published in the Federal Register. Most of the differences were minor grammatical or typographic changes, but there were "two cases where the original text referred to inaccurate or non-existent provisions of law." This raised concerns among advocates for government transparency; the executive director of the Sunlight Foundation said that the "last-minute edits" to the orders indicated problems with the Trump administration's "vetting, sign-off, and publication processes for executive orders." The inaccuracies also prompted concern because the Federal Register versions of presidential documents are often published several days after they are signed, "meaning that the public must often rely on what the White House puts out." In the order on ethics guidelines for federal appointees, the WhiteHouse.gov section cites "section 207 of title 28, United States Code," which ProPublica found does not exist. The correct citation, made in the Federal Register version, is section 207 of title 18. Presidential determination no. 11 (Respect to the Efforts of Foreign Governments Regarding Trafficking in Persons) is not on whitehouse.gov,^{40} however, it is in the Federal Register.

== See also ==
- Executive order
- List of executive actions by Barack Obama, EO #13489–13764 (2009–2017)
- List of executive orders in the first presidency of Donald Trump, EO #13765–13984 (2017–2021)
- List of executive actions by Joe Biden, EO #13985–14144 (2021–2025)
- List of executive orders in the second presidency of Donald Trump, EO #14145–present (2025–present)
- List of bills in the 115th United States Congress
- List of bills in the 116th United States Congress
- List of bills in the 119th United States Congress
- List of acts of the 119th United States Congress
