= List of police reforms related to the George Floyd protests =

Police reforms during the George Floyd protests

During the nationwide protests that followed the murder of George Floyd, protesters, politicians, religious leaders, and other groups called for police reform in the United States. This has led to laws, proposals, and public directives at all levels of government to address police misconduct and systemic racial bias, as well as police brutality in the United States. Some of the common reforms involve bans on chokeholds and no-knock warrants, and improvements to police data collection procedures.

== Background ==
On May 25, 2020, George Floyd, an African-American man, was murdered by a white police officer, Derek Chauvin, in Minneapolis. A video of the incident depicting Chauvin kneeling on Floyd's neck for an extended period, attracted widespread outrage leading to local, national, and international protests and demonstrations against police brutality and racism in policing.

Unrest began as local protests in the Minneapolis–Saint Paul area, then quickly spread across the United States and internationally. The protests are part of a wider Black Lives Matter movement, which began after the acquittal of George Zimmerman in the killing of Trayvon Martin in 2012. Police reforms have been a central part of the movement's demands, and protesters after Floyd's murder articulated several desired outcomes, some of which have been addressed by federal, state, or local lawmakers.

== Federal ==
=== Proposed legislation not enacted ===
==== Justice in Policing Act of 2020 ====
In June 2020, Democrats in Congress introduced the Justice in Policing Act of 2020, a police reform and accountability bill that contains measures to combat police misconduct, excessive force, and racial bias in policing. Advocates and lawmakers have tried to pass police reform measures in the past, and their efforts received renewed energy after the high-profile killings of Floyd, Breonna Taylor, and other African Americans at the hands of police. The bill includes several provisions which aim to improve oversight, accountability, training, and documentation while placing restrictions on techniques like chokeholds and use of deadly force. It was introduced on June 8, but failed to clear a procedural vote in the Senate. The bill was re-introduced in 2021, but again failed to reach a full Senate vote. As of July 2022 no additional progress has been made.

==== George Floyd Law Enforcement Trust and Integrity Act ====
The George Floyd Law Enforcement Trust and Integrity Act is a civil rights bill proposed in the United States House of Representatives by Sheila Jackson Lee (D-TX), co-sponsored by Jerry Nadler (D-NY), Ilhan Omar (D-MN), and Jason Crow (D-CO). The bill would implement national policing standards and accreditations, require agencies to share policing data with the Department of Justice, and make grants available for new programs that help departments recruit, hire, or increase oversight. It also requires the Department of Justice to assemble a task force responsible for law enforcement misconduct cases. This bill was adjoined with the Justice in Policing Act of 2020, which failed to pass.

==== Ending Qualified Immunity Act ====
The Ending Qualified Immunity Act is a police reform bill proposed in the United States House of Representatives by Justin Amash (L-MI-3), cosponsored by 39 members of the House. The bill would remove the judicial doctrine of qualified immunity that protects law enforcement personnel from being held personally responsible for violating the rights of citizens. When introducing the bill, Amash stated that "The brutal killing of George Floyd by Minneapolis police is merely the latest in a long line of incidents of egregious police misconduct. This pattern continues because police are legally, politically, and culturally insulated from consequences for violating the rights of the people whom they have sworn to serve. That must change so that these incidents of brutality stop happening." The bill failed to receive a House or Senate vote. It was reintroduced in 2021, but again failed to receive a vote in either chamber.

=== Executive orders ===
On June 16, 2020, President Donald Trump signed the Executive Order on Safe Policing for Safe Communities, which calls for independent credentialing bodies certified by the United States attorney general, and provides financial incentives for departments which work to attain those credentials. The credentials would be based on criteria set by the attorney general, and should include a ban on chokeholds "except in those situations where the use of deadly force is allowed by law" as well as "policies and training regarding use-of-force and de-escalation techniques; performance management tools, such as early warning systems that help to identify officers who may require intervention; and best practices regarding community engagement." The order also calls for creating a national database with information about "instances of excessive use of force". Regarding police interactions with people with mental health issues or struggling with homelessness or addiction, the order calls for increased training, increasing the capacity for mental health professionals and social workers to work with law enforcement, and researching community-support models.

After Congress failed to pass the George Floyd Justice in Policing Act, on May 25, 2022, the second anniversary of Floyd's murder, President Joe Biden signed Executive Order 14074, creating the National Law Enforcement Accountability Database and enacting other federal policing reforms on a more limited level.

President Trump rescinded Executive Order 14074 on January 20, 2025, with Executive Order 14148, deactivating the NLEAD and the reports generated from it, but leaving in place some of the policy changes (e.g. body cameras) that were made in response to EO 14074.

== States and municipalities ==
=== Arizona ===
State of Arizona, House of Representatives, Fifty-fifth Legislature, Second Regular Session, 2022 passed HB 2650 with bipartisan support. ARS 41-1762 states, "effective June 30, 2025, each law enforcement agency in this state shall require the Major Incident Division [of the Arizona Department of Public Safety], a regional law enforcement task force or another law enforcement agency to perform the criminal investigation of any critical force incidents in this state."

==== Phoenix ====
In May 2021 the city of Phoenix formed the Office of Accountability in Transparency, which investigates Phoenix Police shootings, in-custody deaths, and duty-related incidents where a person dies or suffers serious injury.

=== Arkansas ===
On June 9, 2020, Arkansas Governor Asa Hutchinson signed an executive order to create a police task force to “deal with police training, certification, and standards.” The purpose of the task force is to study and review policies of de-certification, community policing, and recommended means of "enhancing the trust of law enforcement."

=== California ===
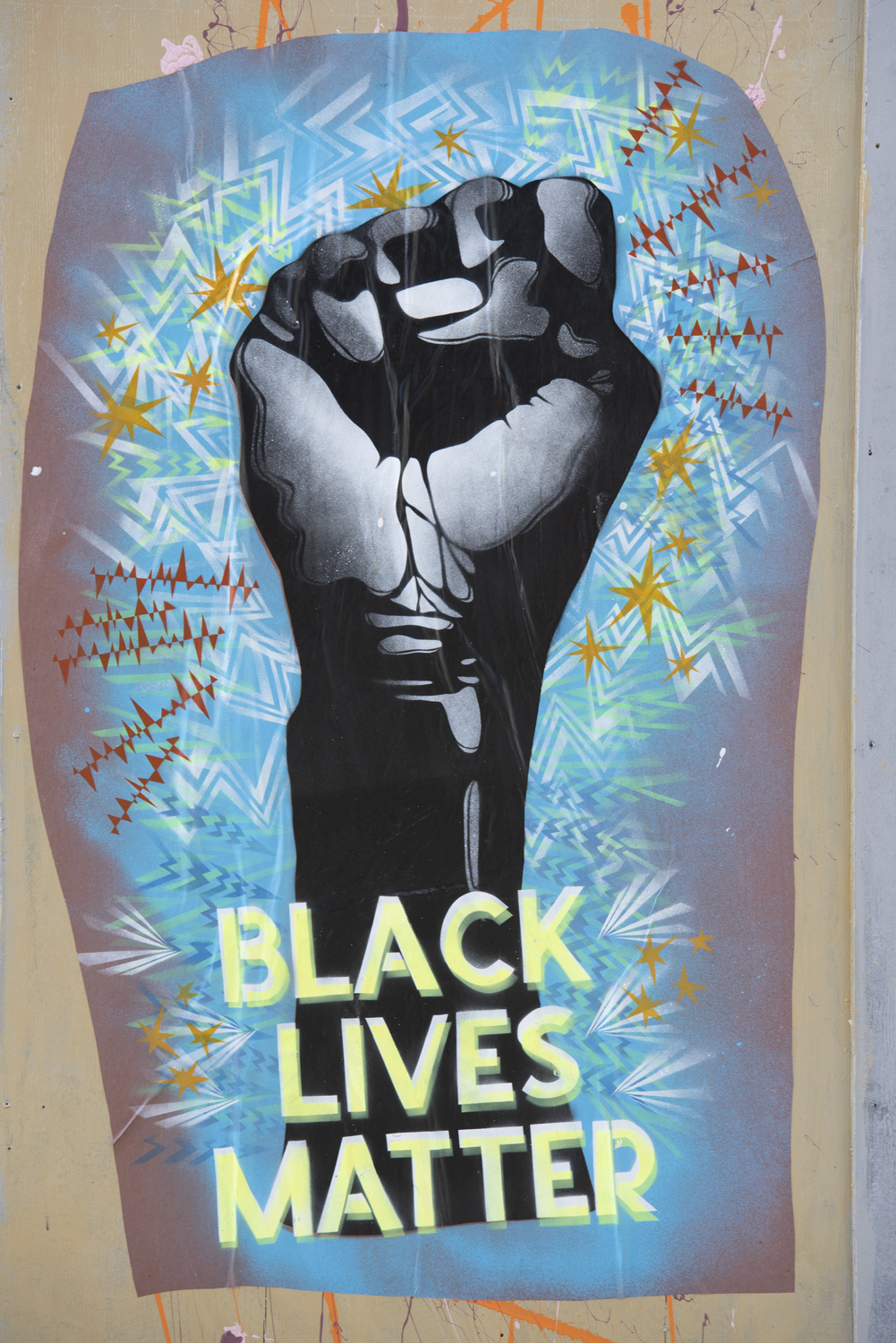
Mural in Oakland, California

On June 5, 2020, California Governor Gavin Newsom called for new police crowd control procedures for the state and the banning of the police use of carotid chokeholds, which starve the brain of oxygen. California Attorney General Xavier Becerra has recommended nine key reforms for local police departments in California, including banning the use of chokeholds, requiring officers to de-escalate situations and give verbal warning before using force, and requiring officers to intervene to stop another officer from using excessive force.

==== Berkeley ====
On June 9, 2020, the city of Berkeley permanently banned police from using tear gas.

==== Davis ====
On June 6, 2020, the Davis Police Department announced that it would prohibit officers from using chokeholds, and would require officers to intervene when observing colleagues using improper levels of force.

==== Fresno ====
In 2020 Fresno's Police chief Paco Balderrama formed a commission to reform the Fresno Police Department. In 2021 Balderrama announced reforms based on the commission's recommendations. The reforms amend the workplace discrimination policy to allow the discriminated the same protections as witnesses, remedies conditions that deter female applicants, disbands the Homeless Task Force, documents corrective action in employee's personnel file, updates the use of force policy, prohibits officers from reaching into moving vehicles, and requires the use of de-escalation techniques.

==== Los Angeles ====
On June 3, 2020, Los Angeles Mayor Eric Garcetti has said he would cut as much as $150 million from the Los Angeles Police Department's budget, a reversal of his planned increase of $120 million. Garcetti announced the funds would be redirected to community initiatives.

==== Sacramento ====
On June 30, 2020, Sacramento City Council members voted on an agreement to appoint an Inspector General to investigate use-of-force incidents involving the Sacramento Police Department.

==== San Diego ====
On June 1, 2020, San Diego Police Department announced an immediate ban on carotid chokeholds, which starve the brain of oxygen. Similarly, San Diego resident and Brazilian jiu-jitsu World Champion Andre Galvão called for all first responders to be trained in grappling to avoid fatalities.

==== San Francisco ====
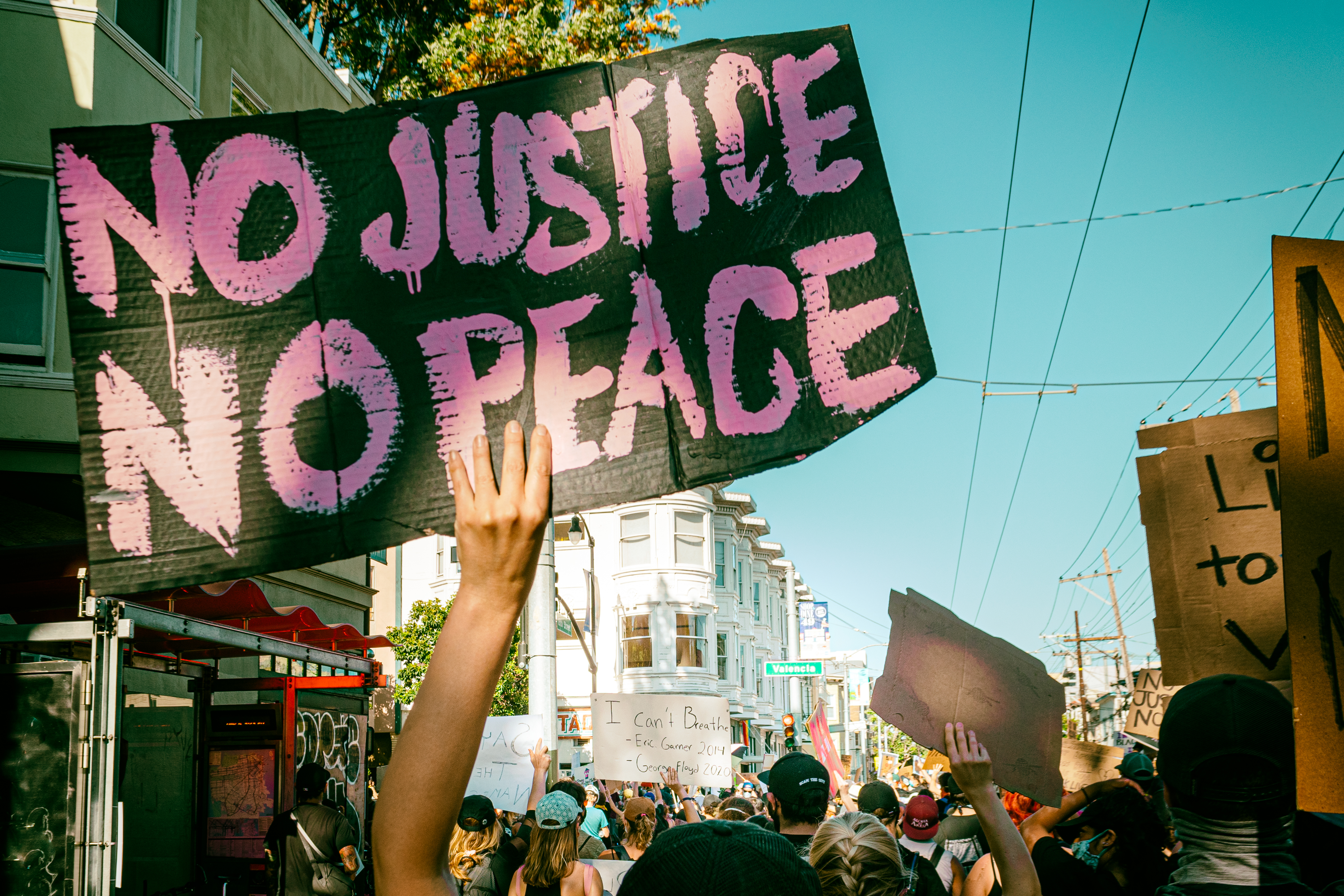
San Francisco, California

On June 11, 2020, the city of San Francisco announced plans for police to stop responding to non-criminal activities such as neighbor disputes, reports on homeless people, and school discipline interventions. Under the proposal, police will be replaced with trained and non-armed professionals.

==== Vallejo ====
Touro University California banned the Vallejo Police Department from using its campus for training. The university's decision came after the shooting of Sean Monterrosa and after the release of a statement from the Vallejo police union which criticized protests of the killing by police.

=== Colorado ===
On June 13, 2020, the Colorado General Assembly passed SB20-217, banning the use of chokeholds, banning the use of tear gas without announcing it or allowing people to disperse, removing the qualified immunity defense, and requiring all officers to use body cameras by July 1, 2023.

==== Denver ====
On June 7, 2020, Denver Police Department banned the use of chokeholds without exception and established new reporting requirements whenever a police officer points a gun at a person. The department will also require its SWAT teams to activate body cameras during tactical operations.

=== Connecticut ===
On June 15, 2020, Connecticut Governor Ned Lamont imposed a series of reforms on the Connecticut State Police.

On July 31, 2020, Governor Lamont signed into law a sweeping police accountability bill. The bill increased state oversight of police officers, strengthened the use-of-force standard, banned consent searches in traffic stops, established an Inspector General to investigate police shootings, and weakened qualified immunity protections for officers.

==== Hartford ====
In June 2020 the Hartford City Council voted to reduce the Hartford Police Department's budget and reallocate some funds to social services.

=== District of Columbia ===
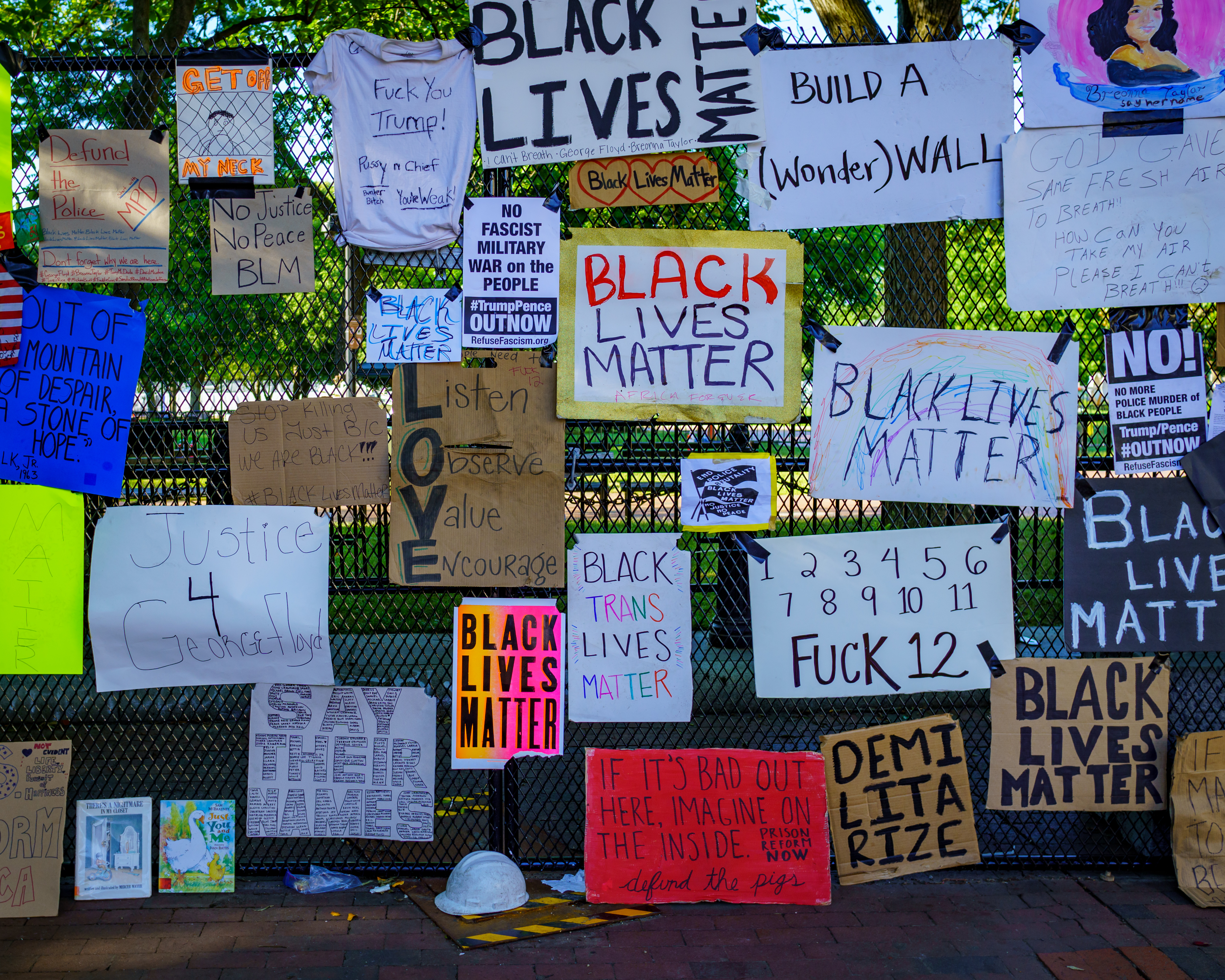
Black Lives Matter Plaza

On June 10, 2020, Washington, D.C. Mayor Muriel Bowser announced that she would sign the D.C. Council's emergency legislation to ban the use of neck restraints, tear gas, pepper spray, rubber bullets, and stun grenades by police. The council has also passed legislation regarding the release of body camera footage.

=== Florida ===
==== Hialeah ====
The Hialeah Police Department announced it would no longer authorize the use of the Applied Carotid Triangle Restraint unless a justified need for deadly force is present.

==== Miami-Dade County ====
Miami-Dade Police Department director Alfredo Ramirez III announced a ban on neck restraints during arrests.

==== Tampa ====
In June 2020 Tampa Mayor Jane Castor announced that the Florida Department of Law Enforcement would investigate all Tampa Police Department shootings as opposed to the Tampa Police Department themselves. Castor also announced officers would officially be required to intervene if they witnessed excessive force and chokeholds were banned, two policies she stated were already in practice unofficially.

=== Georgia ===
==== Atlanta ====
On June 15, 2020, Atlanta Mayor Keisha Lance Bottoms announced a series of administrative orders for police reform, including requirements for reporting deadly force and for training and use of de-escalation techniques.

=== Illinois ===
==== Chicago ====
On June 15, 2020, Chicago Mayor Lori Lightfoot announced the creation of a task force to review the Chicago Police Department's use of force policies. Lightfoot said the department overhauled its policies after the DOJ's oversight agreement and scathing report following the murder of Laquan McDonald but also said it was worth checking if the policies have withstood “the test of time.”

=== Indiana ===
==== Anderson ====
On June 11, 2020, the mayor and the police chief of Anderson banned police from using chokeholds.

==== Gary ====
On June 11, 2020, Gary Mayor Jerome Prince established a police reform commission to evaluate the police department's use of force practices and policies.

=== Iowa ===
On June 12, 2020, Iowa Governor Kim Reynolds signed a police reform bill that bans chokeholds with certain exceptions, and prohibits the police from hiring convicted felons. The bill also requires police to take annual anti-bias and deescalation training for and allows the prosecution of officers for a criminal offense resulting in the death of a human being.

==== Iowa City ====
On June 17, 2020, the Iowa City City Council passed a resolution addressing systemic racism and law enforcement policies. Among the 17 points included restructuring the Iowa City Police Department to community policing, banning the use of chokeholds, ensuring officers have not committed serious misconduct, reviewing body camera and in-car recorder systems, requiring officers to intervene when excessive force is used, and prohibiting the use of tear gas, rubber bullets, and flash bangs against peaceful protesters.

=== Kentucky ===
==== Louisville ====
On June 11, 2020, the Louisville Metro Council unanimously passed Breonna's Law to ban the use of no-knock warrants and requiring police to turn their body cameras on before carrying out a search. The law is named after Breonna Taylor, who was killed during a no-knock search by police in Louisville in March 2020. The public outcry after her death has been a significant part of the Black Lives Matter protests which gained intensity after the murder of George Floyd.

=== Kansas ===
==== Wichita ====
The Wichita Police Department added "new language" to its policies on chokeholds, officers intervening in excessive force, and rendering aid.

=== Louisiana ===
==== New Orleans ====
In June, 2020, New Orleans Chief of Police Shaun Ferguson announced that the New Orleans Police Department would be adopting several new policy changes in an effort to address community concerns. In alignment with the #8cantwait movement, changes included officers being required to employ de-escalation tactics exhaustively before announcing to discharge weapons, the use of chokeholds being banned, and requiring officers to intervene and stop excessive force used by other officers; reporting these incidents immediately to a supervisor.

=== Maryland ===
On April 10, 2021, the Maryland General Assembly overrode Governor Larry Hogan's vetoes to enact comprehensive policing reforms. Changes to the state laws and policies include limits to no-knock warrants, body camera requirements, and a repeal of the state's police Bill of Rights.

==== Baltimore County ====
The Baltimore County Council passed legislation that bans police from using chokeholds, encourages officers to intervene if they witness excessive force, and provides whistleblower protection to officers who report excessive force.

=== Massachusetts ===
In the wake of the murder of George Floyd, State Senate President Karen Spilka announced the creation of a racial justice advisory group led by State Senators Sonia Chang-Diaz and William Brownsberger to draft legislation in response to police brutality, which was subsequently passed and signed into law by Governor Charlie Baker. This sweeping police reform law, An Act relative to justice, equity and accountability in law enforcement in the Commonwealth, pioneers multiple novel approaches to police reform. For example, the law created a first-in-the-nation civilian-led commission to standardize the certification and decertification of police officers, with the power to conduct independent investigations into police misconduct, and also created the first state-wide restriction on law enforcement's use of facial recognition technology in the United States. The bill also banned the use of chokeholds and created a duty to intervene for police officers when witnessing another officer using force inappropriately. The law was called "robust" by commentators, including the ACLU's Director of Racial Justice, who noted that it created "probably the strongest" police oversight commission in the country.

=== Michigan ===
On May 28, Michigan State Senator Jeff Irwin introduced Senate Bill 945 which would require the addition of "implicit bias, de-escalation techniques, and mental health screening" as part of the Michigan Commission on Law Enforcement Standards certification process for new law enforcement officers. The bill was drafted before the murder of George Floyd in response to the broader problem of police brutality. It passed the State Senate unanimously on June 4.

==== Detroit ====
On August 27, 2020, the Detroit Board of Police Commissioners announced Detroit Police would be banned from using chokeholds. They also announced restrictions on firing at and from a moving vehicle, requirements for officers to report excessive force, and measures for reporting when officers threaten to use force.

=== Minnesota ===
On July 21, 2020, the Minnesota state legislature passed major police reform legislation. The new compromise law includes a limited ban on police from using chokehold restraint in the state of Minnesota so long as the officers were not at greater risk. However, the law also bans the old warrior training program, which was regarded as dehumanizing people and encouraging aggressive conduct. The law also requires additional training for Minnesota peace officers. Also signed into law was a statutory duty to intercede. Section 626.8475 of the Minnesota statutes requires peace officers to intercede in the event of unlawful use of deadly force or excessive force, and when present and able to do so. The section also mandates officers report excessive force within 24 hours of observing it. The police reform legislation was signed into law by Minnesota Governor Tim Walz on July 23, 2020.

==== Minneapolis ====
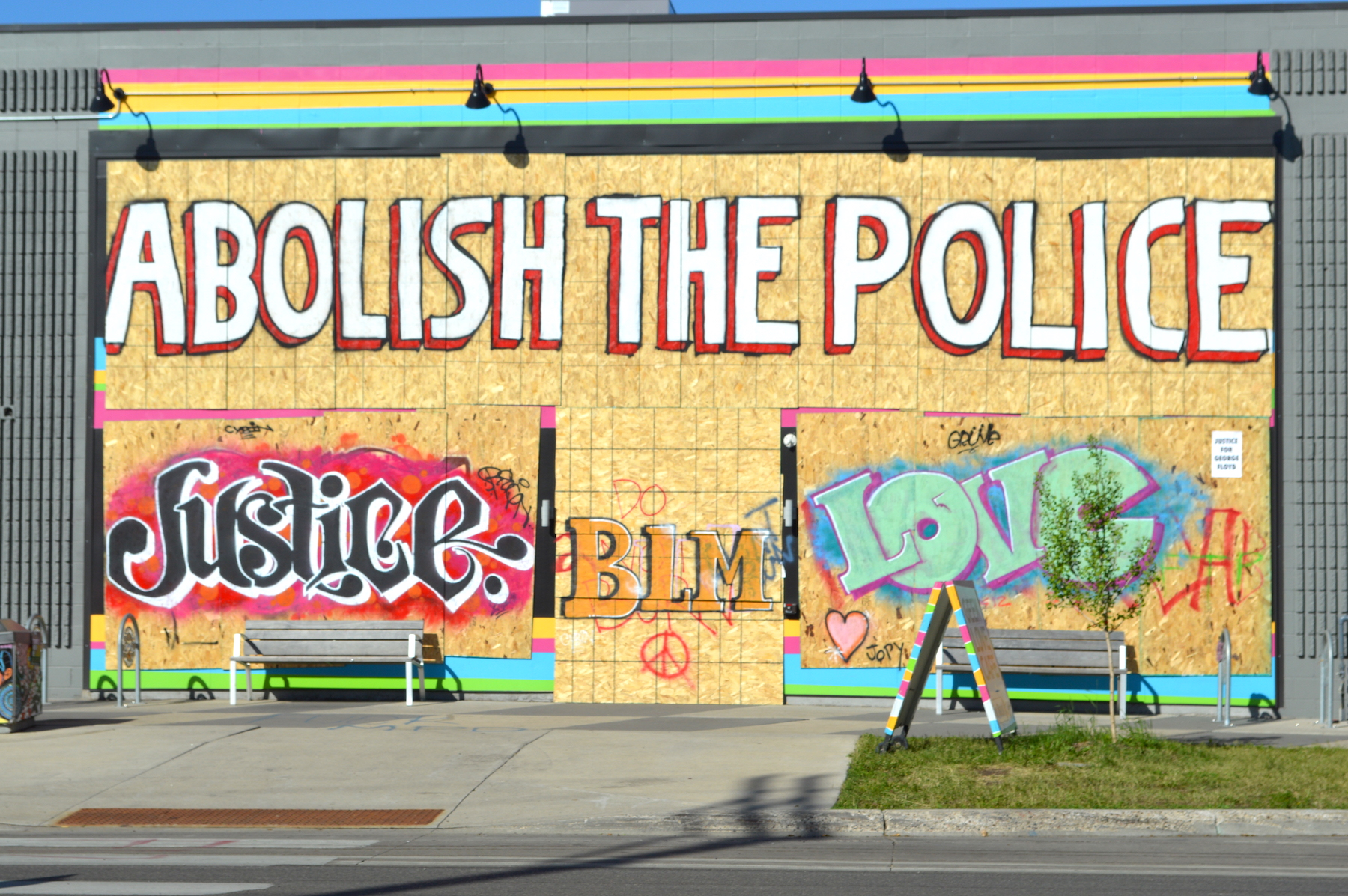
Graffiti and political messages on a boarded up store in Minneapolis, June 4

The 2020 protests were a reaction to the murder of George Floyd by a Minneapolis police officer, increasing public scrutiny of its law enforcement policies. On June 5, 2020, the Minneapolis City Council and the Minnesota Department of Human Rights agreed to a temporary restraining order requiring Minneapolis to update its procedures to ban chokeholds and other neck restraints by police, such as the one an officer used when murdering George Floyd. The order also required police officers to report and intervene against the use of excessive force by other officers, and required authorization from the police chief or deputy police chiefs before using crowd-control weapons such as chemical agents and rubber bullets.

Nine members of the Minneapolis City Council – a veto-proof majority – pledged on June 7 to dismantle the city's police department, despite opposition from the city's mayor, Jacob Frey. On June 26, 2020, a proposed amendment was approved by the Minneapolis City Council On August 5, 2020, the Minneapolis City Charter Commission cancelled plans to put the proposed city charter amendment which was passed by the Minneapolis City Council on the November 2020 ballot.

The University of Minnesota and Minneapolis Public Schools changed their relationship with the city's police force, with the city's school board voting to cut ties with the department. The Minneapolis Park and Recreation Board also voted unanimously to have the park police cut ties with the city's police force, and to change park police uniforms and vehicles to distinguish them from Minneapolis police.

On June 10, 2020, Police Chief Medaria Arradondo announced the police department was withdrawing from union contract negotiations as a first step towards police reforms.

On December 10, 2020, the city council voted to redirect $8 million of the police budget towards community alternatives while keeping the current number of police officers in the department.

In the years following the murder, the US Department of Justice and the Minnesota Department of Human Rights launched investigations into discriminatory policing by Minneapolis PD. Reports were released by the state in April 2022 and the DoJ in June 2023. As a result of these investigations, a court-enforceable consent decree between Minneapolis and the State of Minnesota went into effect in July 2023, mandating that the Minneapolis Police Department enact a series of changes to address race-based policing. The investigations were ended by the DOJ in 2025.

=== Missouri ===
==== Kansas City ====
On June 4, 2020, Kansas City Mayor Quinton Lucas announced a series of police reforms, including whistleblower protections, independent review of officer-involved shootings, and use of body cameras by police officers.

=== Nebraska ===
==== Omaha ====
Omaha Police Chief Todd Schmaderer and Omaha Mayor Jean Stothert announced several changes to the department's use of force policy. The reforms require officers to intervene in excessive force cases, bans knee-to-neck restraints, and requires new training for all officers starting in July 2020.

=== New Jersey ===
On June 5, 2020, New Jersey banned the use of chokeholds and similar restraints except when "deadly force is necessary to address an imminent threat to life". Attorney General Gurbir Grewal commented: "Because these tactics create a substantial risk of death or serious bodily harm, officers who cause a subject's death or injury while performing them face potential criminal liability".

=== New York ===
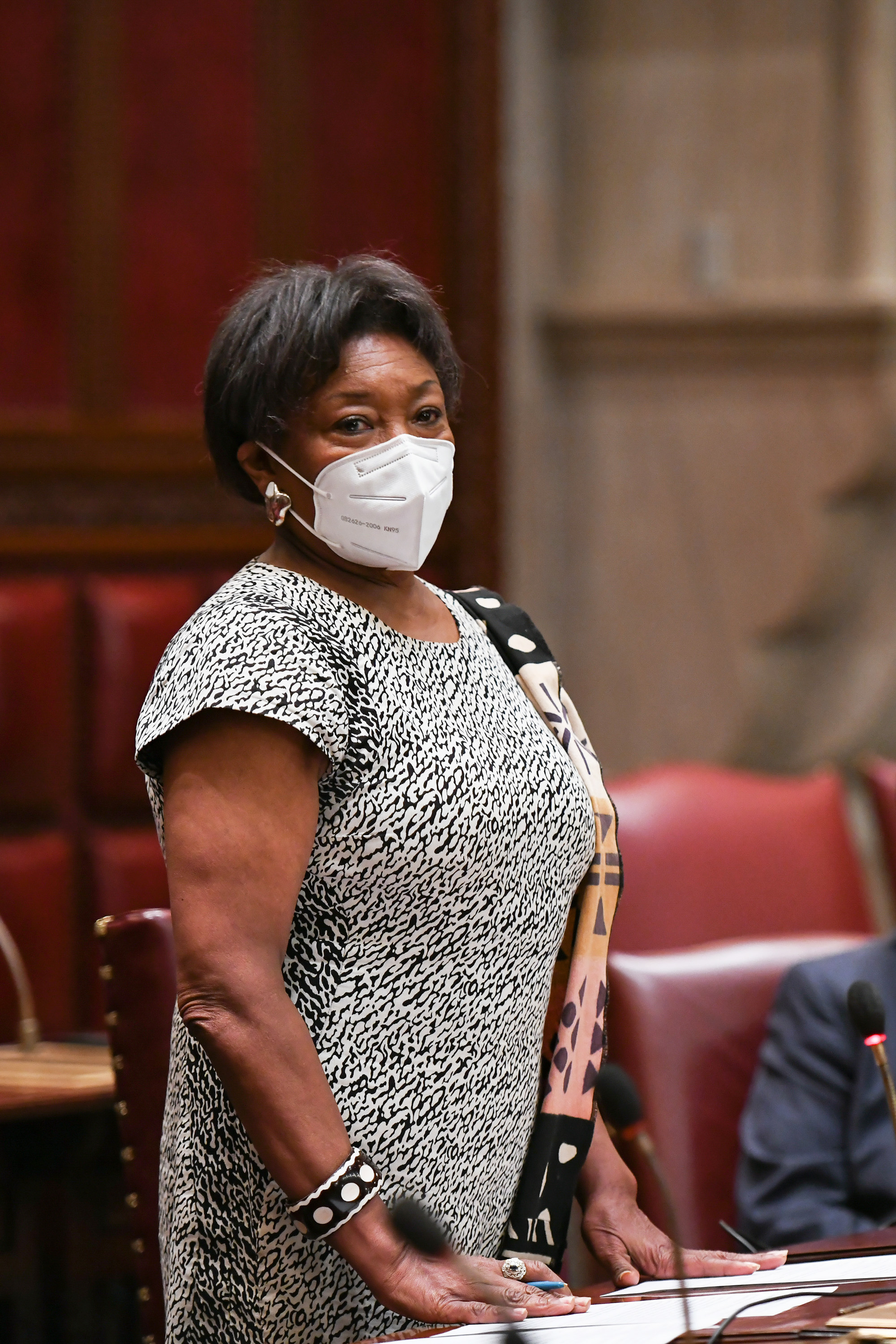
New York State Senate Majority Leader Andrea Stewart-Cousins on June 10

On June 8, 2020, the New York State Legislature began to approve a series of bills targeting police misconduct, including the Eric Garner Anti-Chokehold Act, making police use of a chokehold a felony punishable with up to 15 years in prison.

The legislature also passed a prohibition on race-based profiling and mandated tracking of race and ethnicity data in arrests. On June 9, the legislature repealed section 50-a of the New York Civil Rights Law, which required permission by an officer or a judge in order to release any "personnel records used to evaluate performance" of that officer. New York Governor Andrew Cuomo signed the bills into law on June 12 at a ceremony including Valerie Bell and Gwen Carr (mothers of Sean Bell and Eric Garner, respectively), NAACP President Hazel Dukes, and Al Sharpton. On June 12, Cuomo also signed an executive order mandating that all police departments get local government approval for a reform plan by April 1, 2021, in order to continue to be eligible for state funding.

On June 15, 2020, Cuomo signed three additional pieces of police reform legislation into law. The legislation will change reporting requirements for police discharge of firearms, will require courts to compile demographic data on policing, and will ensure that police provide medical and mental health assistance when individuals in police custody require assistance. On June 17, Cuomo signed a bill requiring state troopers to use body cameras during "all uses of force, all arrests and all interactions with people suspected of criminal activity", among other situations.

==== Buffalo ====
On June 10, 2020, Buffalo Mayor Byron Brown announced a series of police reforms, including policy changes for body cameras and the policing of non-violent offenses, requirements of de-escalation and bias training, and the establishment of a special commission to examine police policies and procedures.

==== New York City ====
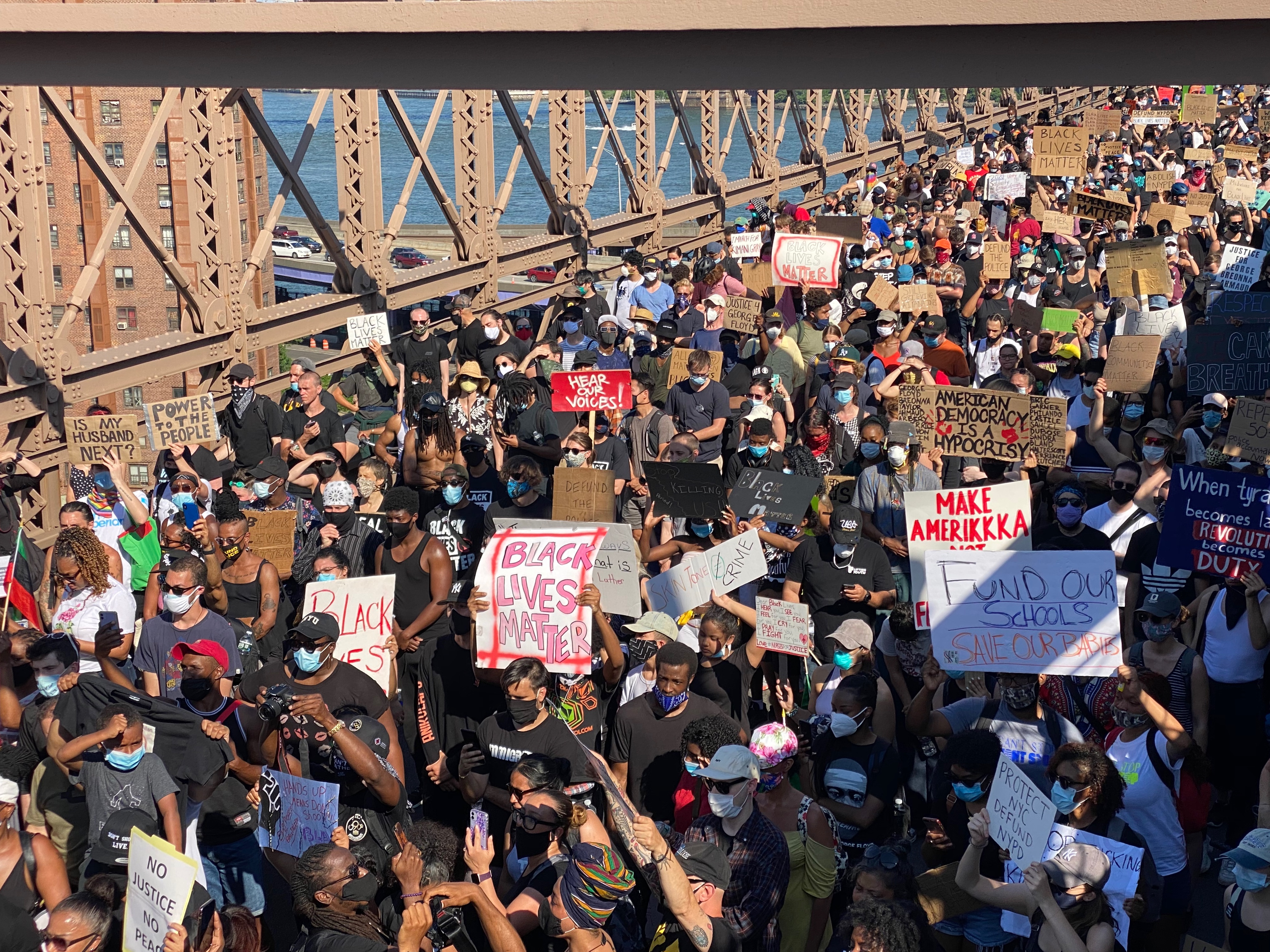
Brooklyn Bridge

On June 7, 2020, New York City Mayor Bill de Blasio announced that funds would be reallocated from the NYPD into youth and social services. De Blasio did not specify how much funding would be diverted but expressed intent to work with the City Council to come up with a plan before the July 1 budget deadline. De Blasio also announced that the enforcement of street vendor laws and regulations would no longer be carried out by the NYPD.

On June 15, 2020, NYPD Commissioner Dermot Shea announced that the department was disbanding its plainclothes units and reassigning those roughly 600 officers. Plainclothes officers will remain in the city's transit system.

On June 18, 2020, the New York City Council passed a series of police reforms, including a bill to criminalize the use of chokeholds by the New York Police Department (NYPD), legislation with enough support to overcome a mayoral veto after it stalled after the killing of Eric Garner. The council also voted to require police to report on its surveillance of residents, to require officers to show badge numbers, and to create a new disciplinary matrix.

As the city's June 30 budget deadline approached, protesters convened in City Hall Park to "Occupy City Hall", filling the park day and night to call for reducing the NYPD budget. On June 30, the City Council passed a budget which removes $1 billion from the NYPD. It cancels plans to hire 1,160 new police and transfers responsibility to monitor vending, homeless populations, and schools to other entities. According to the New York Times, the details of the budget "seemed to please no one". Those seeking reforms to policing did not think it went far enough, while others pointed to increasing crime rates in the city at the time. The budget does not halt a different wave of police hiring planned for October, while it does continue a freeze on many other city employees like teachers. Jumaane Williams cited an obscure law requiring the Public Advocate to authorize collection of real estate taxes, and threatened not to do so if the next class of officers was not also canceled. In August 2020, the New York Times reported that the $1 billion cut from the police budget mostly involved shifting some responsibilities to other city agencies, with the size of the police force barely changing.

=== North Carolina ===
==== Charlotte ====
On June 8, 2020, the Charlotte City Council passed Braxton Winston's legislation to ban the Charlotte-Mecklenburg Police Department from funding new or existing chemical agents used in crowd control and dispersal, such as tear gas. The council also established a standing committee to scrutinize and adjust police spending and policy.

==== Raleigh ====
On June 9, 2020, Raleigh Mayor Mary-Ann Baldwin announced the ban of chokeholds, strangleholds, and shooting at moving vehicles. Baldwin also announced a de-escalation requirement and an independent review of the response to protests the week prior.

=== Ohio ===
==== Columbus ====
Columbus mayor Andrew Ginther issued an executive order requiring all fatal incidents involving police in Columbus to be investigated by the Ohio Bureau of Criminal Investigation.

=== Oklahoma ===
==== Oklahoma City ====
In September 2022 Oklahoma City mayor David Holt announced a series of reforms. Among them include a review of the de-escalation policy and the creation of a dedicated response team to mental health crises.

=== Oregon ===
==== Portland ====
On June 5, 2020, Portland Public Schools cancelled its school resource officers program with the Portland Police Bureau.

On June 9, 2020, Portland Mayor Ted Wheeler announced a series of police reforms, including disbanding the gun violence reduction unit, ending city officers' participation in the Transit Police, and reallocating money saved plus $5 million on initiatives "to help build the health, wealth and well-being of black people in Portland."

Portland State University announced in 2020 that it would disarm its campus officers and began unarmed patrols in September 2021. However, in April 2023, it announced that it had begun "allowing officers to arm at their discretion".

=== Pennsylvania ===
On June 8, 2020, members of the Pennsylvania Legislative Black Caucus took over the floor of the Pennsylvania House of Representatives to protest police brutality and demand action on a series of police reform bills.

On June 30, The Pennsylvania General Assembly unanimously approved two bills that would bring about the largest changes to Pennsylvania policing in 40 years. The first requires a thorough background check of applicants and establishes an electronic database that contains records if an officer separated from any previous departments. The second requires mental health evaluations with a focus on PTSD and training for officers on trauma-Informed care, use of force, de-escalation techniques, and recognizing signs of child abuse and childhood trauma. Governor Tom Wolf signed these two measures into law on July 14.

==== Philadelphia ====
In September 2020 the Philadelphia City Council approved measures that would ban chokeholds and kneeling on a person's neck.

=== Rhode Island ===
As part of Governor Gina Raimondo's "Rise Together" directive, the Rhode Island State Police agreed to obtain and wear body cameras. All 48 local police chiefs in the state signed a pledge to do the same and to increase anti-bias training and diversity of hiring.

=== Tennessee ===
House Democrats in Tennessee introduced the "George Floyd Act," a series of police reform amendments, but the bill is on hold until a Senate bill is heard in December 2020.

=== Texas ===
==== Austin ====
On June 11, 2020, the Austin City Council unanimously approved a series of police reforms, including a ban on the use of "less lethal" munitions during protests, restrictions on the use of deadly force, and a direction to the city manager to propose reductions to the police department's budget in 2021. Ultimately, the department's budget was reduced by $150 million with the money being reinvested into various initiatives like violence prevention, food access, and abortion access.

==== Dallas ====
On June 5, 2020, the Dallas Police Department implemented "duty to intervene" policy that required officers to act if they witnessed fellow officers using excessive force. Furthermore, the city council approved a $7 million cut in the Dallas Police Department's overtime budget to reinvest in other initiatives.

==== Houston ====
On June 10, 2020, Houston Mayor Sylvester Turner signed an executive order that limited the police ability to use excessive force and no-knock raids.

=== Utah ===
==== Salt Lake City ====
Salt Lake City Mayor Erin Mendenhall signed an executive order changing several policies, including duty for officers to intervene if they witness excessive force and requiring written or filmed consent from an owner if searching a vehicle without a warrant.

=== Virginia ===
==== Norfolk ====
The Norfolk City council agreed on a series of changes, which would ban high speed police chases unless they involve a felony that resulted in serious injury or death, petitions the Virginia Department of Criminal Justice Services to end the mandate of officers being trained to use carotid chokeholds, and publishes Norfolk Police Department policy and procedures.

=== Washington ===
==== Bellevue ====
The City of Bellevue announced on June 5, 2020, that it would no longer allow neck restraints.

==== Seattle ====
Following a large and peaceful demonstration on June 3, 2020, the City of Seattle announced several changes to its policing protocols, including restrictions on badge coverings for officers. City Attorney Pete Holmes announced that the city would withdraw its request to lift a federal consent decree that had been imposed following a DOJ investigation in 2012. The city government also announced a 30-day ban on the use of tear gas by police on protesters in response to outcry from Capitol Hill residents who had been affected by its use. The ban did not apply to SWAT and other special officers, however, and tear gas was used the following day.

On June 9, 2020, Seattle Schools Superintendent Denise Juneau announced that a resolution would be put to the school board to reevaluate the relationship between Seattle Schools and the Seattle Police Department regarding four School Emphasis Officers, employed and paid by the City of Seattle and one SPD School Resource Officer, also paid by the city.

On June 15, 2020, Seattle City Council passed Kshama Sawant's legislation to ban the use of chokeholds, including neck and carotid restraints. The lawmakers also passed Sawant's ban on the use of crowd weapons by police, including tear gas, acoustic weapons, and water cannons, as well as Lisa Herbold's ban on badge mourning bands.

Discussions continued through July on defunding and restructuring the Seattle Police Department although concrete actions have yet to be finalized by the city council.

==== Tacoma ====
On June 16, the Tacoma Police Department announced a commitment to reforms in line with the 8 Can't Wait campaign. Police Chief Don Ramsdell said the department already had five of the eight requirements, but would commit to the other three: a ban on chokeholds, duty of officers to intervene when seeing others use excessive force, and require verbal warnings before use of deadly force.

=== Wisconsin ===
==== Milwaukee ====
The Milwaukee Fire and Police Commission passed a complete ban on chokeholds and other neck restraints. In addition, the Milwaukee Police Department requires officers to file a report whenever they point a gun at someone, bans use of pepper spray at peaceful protests, requires officers determine if an alternative restraint can be used if the restrained says they can't breathe, and requires officers roll a person on their side or a sitting position once they are handcuffed.

==== Racine ====
On June 11, 2020, leaders of Racine unanimously agreed to establish the Mayor's Task Force on Police Reform.

==== Wauwatosa ====
Several months after the killing of Alvin Cole in Wauwatosa, the city of Wauwatosa approved funding to equip officers with body cameras.

== International ==
=== Canada ===
On June 9, 2020, the Halifax Regional Council voted to cancel the order of an armored police vehicle and to reallocate the vehicle's $368,000 cost to the city of Halifax's diversity and inclusion office, public safety office, and anti-racism programs.

On June 25, 2020, Mayor of Toronto John Tory tabled a motion to "detask" the Toronto Police Service in response to calls for police reform sparked by the police murder of Floyd and a series of similar incidents in Toronto and elsewhere in Canada, such as the death of Regis Korchinski-Paquet. Under the proposal, duties currently assigned to sworn officers would be assumed by "alternative models of community safety response" to incidents where neither violence nor weapons are at issue, such as some calls regarding persons suffering mental health crises, with the specific redirected duties and alternative models to be developed based on a report that the motion would commission. The proposal would “commit that its first funding priority for future budgets [be] centered on a robust system of social supports and services" and make an itemized line-by-line breakdown of the police budget public; a reduction in the police budget would likely ensue, according to the motion.

=== New Zealand ===
In June 2020, New Zealand police decided to terminate a pilot program and keep its officers unarmed in ordinary circumstances. Police attributed the decision to public feedback, though Maori activists said the George Floyd protests helped avoid the "Americanization" of New Zealand police.

== See also ==
- 8 Can't Wait
- 8 to Abolition
- "Defund the police"
- List of monuments and memorials removed during the George Floyd protests
- Police abolition movement
- List of law enforcement officers convicted for an on-duty killing in the United States
- 2020s in political history
