= Social policy of the Biden administration =

The social policy of the Joe Biden administration was intended to improve racial equity, increase access to safe and legal abortions, tighten restrictions on gun sales, among other aims. A number of policies aim to reverse the former policies of President Donald Trump, including the "Muslim" travel ban and loosened anti-discriminatory policies relating to LGBT people.

== Law enforcement and justice ==
=== Capital punishment ===
Joe Biden is the first U.S. president to openly oppose the death penalty.

=== Gun policy ===
President Biden promised to introduce a stiffer gun-control policy, while Vice President Kamala Harris has a history of implementing tough-on-guns measures during her time as attorney general of California.

Due to fears of the Biden administration in tandem with the Democratic Party controlling Congress to enact sweeping gun reform legislation, gun owners across the country reported a big increase in sales in the two weeks preceding Biden's inauguration, as firearm sellers in states such as California, Virginia, Tennessee, Montana, and Florida saw lines stretching out the doors of some stores.

Biden signed the Bipartisan Safer Communities Act, a major piece of gun control legislation, into law on June 25, 2022.

== Immigration ==
=== Travel ban ===
Biden was a vocal opponent of Trump's controversial travel ban, which had set immigration restrictions on predominantly Muslim countries, and then with proclamations predominantly African countries. On his first day as president, Biden passed Presidential Proclamation 10141, which revoked Executive Order 13769, Executive Order 13780, and Presidential Proclamations 9645, 9723, and 9983, which mandated the travel ban.

=== Illegal drugs ===
Pursuant to regulations (34 CFR 86) required by the Drug-Free Schools and Communities Act Amendments of 1989 (codified at 20 U.S.C. § 1011i), as a condition of receiving funds or any other form of financial assistance under any Federal program, an institution of higher education must certify that it has adopted and implemented a drug prevention program which adheres to regulations in 34 CFR 86.100. It has recently gained renewed attention due to Colorado Amendment 64.

=== Medical marijuana ===
President Biden stated in February 2021 that his administration will pursue cannabis decriminalization, as well as seek expungements for people with prior cannabis convictions. As of January 2021, although Biden had stood for decriminalization and descheduling during his campaign, the administration had not formulated an explicit policy on cannabis. Some political and cannabis industry observers like the editor of Leafly thought the administration would be likely to assist in carrying out his campaign promises on cannabis through the MORE Act, sponsored by then-Senator Kamala Harris, or through executive order. Failing full legalization, he could improve banking access by supporting the SAFE Act.

== LGBT rights ==
Executive Order 13988 – Preventing and Combating Discrimination on the Basis of Gender Identity or Sexual Orientation

During his 2020 presidential campaign, Biden vowed to support legislation and action to prohibit discrimination against transgender people, and to combat hate crimes targeting LGBT persons, including violence and harassment against transgender people. He supports the Equality Act, which would add sex, sexual orientation and gender identity to the Civil Rights Act of 1964, as well as the Safe Schools Improvement Act, a proposed anti-bullying law.

In office, Biden signed Executive Order 13988, Preventing and Combating Discrimination on the Basis of Gender Identity or Sexual Orientation, which aimed to prevent and combat discrimination on the basis of gender identity or sexual orientation, and to fully enforce Title VII of the Civil Rights Act of 1964 and other laws that prohibit discrimination on the basis of gender identity or sexual orientation. Biden also aimed to enforce Bostock v. Clayton County (2020), where the Supreme Court held that Title VII's prohibition on discrimination "because of . . . sex" covers discrimination on the basis of gender identity and sexual orientation. He also signed Executive Order 14004, Enabling All Qualified Americans to Serve Their Country in Uniform, which reversed the Trump administration's previous memorandum that prevented most transgender individuals from serving in the United States Armed Forces.

On April 11, 2022, the U.S. State Department allowed applicants to select "gender X" on their passports and made sex designation a matter of self-identification.

On December 13, 2022, Biden signed the Respect for Marriage Act into law, repealing the Defense of Marriage Act and codifying federal recognition of same-sex and interracial marriages.

== Pride month ==
During the 2023 June Pride Month, Biden launched LGBTQI+ Community Safety Partnership because transgender women "have experienced disproportionately high rates of violence and hate crimes for decades." He also decried "prejudiced" laws passed in various states.

On June 10, 2023, Biden and his wife hosted a Pride event on the White House South Lawn. He told his audience, "So today, I want to send a message to the entire community — especially to transgender children: You are loved. You are heard. You're understood. And you belong."

== Gender equality ==
In January 2025, Biden declared the long-lapsed Equal Rights Amendment ratified as the "28th Amendment" to the constitution. However, the declaration has no formal effect and the National Archives has said they do not intend to certify the amendment as part of the constitution, citing "established legal, judicial, and procedural decisions."

== Race relations ==
During his early days in office, Biden focused on racial equity more than any president since Lyndon B. Johnson, who passed the Civil Rights Act of 1964. Biden embraced and continued on the social policies of Barack Obama, the first African-American president, under whom he had been vice president.

=== African Americans ===
Biden passed Executive Order 13985, which advances racial equity and support for under-served communities through the federal government. It revoked Executive Order 13958, passed by Trump, which had established the controversial 1776 commission to counter critical race theory pushed by the 1619 project.

He signed the Juneteenth National Independence Day Act, which established Juneteenth as a federal holiday. He also signed the Emmett Till Antilynching Act, which criminalizes lynching as a hate crime under federal law.

=== Native Americans and Tribal communities ===
Biden reinstated the Tribal Nations Summit, held annually, and passed executive orders that promote tribal self-determination self-governance.

In October 2024, Biden issued an official apology on behalf of the federal government for the abuse suffered in American Indian boarding schools.

=== White supremacy ===
The 2021 United States Capitol attack and its aftermath highlighted the rise of domestic violent extremism (DVE), along with white supremacy, as a national security threat. The Biden administration stated in a press briefing that they were committed to developing policies and strategies based on objective and rigorous analysis with respect for constitutionally protected free speech and political activities. The Biden administration requested the ODNI, along with the FBI and DHS, to perform a comprehensive threat assessment drawing from governmental and non-governmental organizations, law enforcement, and intelligence officials. The administration also ordered the building of an NSC capability, to focus on countering DVE, and a policy review effort to determine how the government can "share information better about this threat, support efforts to prevent radicalization, disrupt violent extremist networks, and more". Biden also ordered the coordinating of government agencies to enhance and accelerate efforts to address DVE, such as an NSC-convened process to focus on "addressing evolving threats, radicalization, the role of social media, opportunities to improve information sharing, operational responses, and more".

== Abortion ==
=== Roe v. Wade ===
The Biden administration supports codifying the right to an abortion via passage of the Women's Health Protection Act, and opposed the judgement of the U.S. Supreme Court in Dobbs v. Jackson Women's Health Organization, which reversed Roe v. Wade, a decision that gave federal protection of abortion rights. The administration is also committed to eliminate maternal and infant health disparities, increase access to contraception, and support families economically.

Biden issued Executive Order 14076, titled "Protecting Access to Reproductive Healthcare Services" following the Dobbs decision. This executive order directs the Department of Health and Human Services (HHS) to expand and make accessible multiple forms of contraception, such as medication abortion, emergency contraception, and long-term contraception. Other components of the order include public outreach, a reproductive healthcare task force, and clarification of the responsibilities and protections of physicians through the Emergency Medical Treatment and Labor Act.

President Biden signed the executive order "Securing Access to Reproductive and Other Healthcare Services" on August 3, 2022, due to restrictions on abortions at the state level following Dobbs. Biden's executive order expands access to reproductive health services through Medicaid funds for patients crossing state lines. It also emphasizes non-discrimination laws and attempts to ensure that people are not denied reproductive health care.

=== Mexico City policy ===
On January 28, 2021, President Biden issued an executive order that rescinds the "global gag" rule, best known as the "Mexico City policy", which bans US government funding for non-governmental organizations (NGOs) that perform abortions or support the right of women to terminate a pregnancy.

=== Title X ===
On October 5, 2021, the Biden administration announced a reversal of a Trump-era rule that banned providers who offered abortions or referred patients for abortions from receiving Title X funding. The administration said that the move is intended to increase the quality of family care that was decreased under this rule.

=== State-level abortion laws ===
Following the 2022 elections, the Biden administration praised the passage of pro-abortion referendums such as Michigan Proposal 3 and the rejection of anti-abortion referendums such as the Kansas Value Them Both Amendment.

The Biden administration has denounced state-level abortion bans in states such as Indiana, and unsuccessfully litigated one of Texas' abortion bans in United States v. Texas.
