= Ignite =

To ignite is the first step of firelighting.

Ignite may also refer to:

== Music ==
- Ignite (band), a melodic hardcore band from Orange County, California
- Ignite (Econoline Crush album), 2007
- Ignite (Shihad album), 2010
- "Ignite" (Eir Aoi song), a single by Japanese singer Eir Aoi
- "Ignite" (K-391 song), a single by Norwegian music producer K-391, featuring DJ Alan Walker, Julie Bergan and Korean artist Seungri
- "Ignite" (The Damned song), a song by The Damned on their 1982 album Strawberries

== Other uses ==
- Ignite (event), a series of events where speakers have five minutes to talk on a subject
- Microsoft Ignite, an annual conference for developers and IT professionals hosted by Microsoft.
- Ignite (game engine), a game engine for EA Sports games
- Ignite (microprocessor), a stack-based RISC microprocessor architecture
- Ignite (youth program), a program for gifted and talented young people in South Australia
- Ignite, the name used by Stream Energy for its multi-level marketing arm
- Apache Ignite, an open-source distributed database
- Ignite!, an education software company in the USA
- NBA G League Ignite, a developmental basketball team which is affiliated but does not compete in the NBA G League
- Ignite, a magazine published by Northeast Ohio Medical University
- Ignites, a media company covering the mutual fund industry and owned by the Financial Times
- IGNITE, a brand of disposable vape pens; see Dan Bilzerian § Ignite
- Ignite TV, a brand of Rogers Cable, which is a cable TV provider. It was rebranded into Rogers Xfinity.
- Ignite Institute, a STEAM secondary school in Erlanger, Kentucky

== See also ==
- Ignition (disambiguation)
- Ignitor (disambiguation)
