= Conner High School =

Location
- 3310 Cougar Path; Hebron, KY 41048; United States; 39°03′40″N 84°41′47″W

Information
- Type: Public Secondary
- Motto: Pride, Honor, and Integrity
- Established: 1970
- Principal: Andy Wyckoff
- Teaching staff: 80.50 (FTE)
- Enrollment: 1,413 (2023–2024)
- Student to teacher ratio: 17.55
- Colors: Blue █ and Scarlett █
- Mascot: Cougar
- Website: https://chs.boone.kyschools.us/o/chs

Conner High School is a 9–12 grade public school located in Hebron, Kentucky United States. Conner is part of a larger campus that includes Conner Middle School and Goodridge Elementary. The Boone County Area Technology Center (formerly Boone County Vocational School) also sits on the same campus. Conner is accredited by the Commission of Secondary Schools of the Southern Association of Colleges and Schools and by the State of Kentucky.

== History ==
The school is named after the Conner family of Hebron, who donated the land due to overcrowding in nearby Boone County High School, located in Florence, Ky. Construction problems delayed its opening, and school started with two classes and two teachers in one classroom at Conner Junior High School. Since the athletic facilities were not finished, football and basketball games were played at Boone County High School. Conner High School opened its doors for the first time on October 15, 1970, with less than 60 students in grades 10–12.

Paul Hogan was selected to be the principal, Hilliard Collins.

Since those 136 students graduated in the first class of 1971, over 6000 students have gone through the graduation ceremonies. These graduates have made their mark in society. Many have continued their education in the finest colleges and universities in the nation. Conner alumni represent a wide range of professions and occupations.

Today, with an enrollment over 1300, a comprehensive, fully accredited high school curriculum, extra curricular and athletic programs are offered.

Throughout the 2010–2011 school year, Conner High School was remodeled and updated. The change included remodeled bathrooms, new flooring, new science classrooms (in place of the former library), and a new library. Every classroom in the school was outfitted with new projectors, smartboards, Motion-Activated Lights, and classroom speakers.

== Athletics ==
Conner High School is active in a variety of men's and women's athletics.

| Men's sports | Women's sports |
|---|---|
| Baseball; Soccer; Basketball; Swimming; Cross Country; Tennis; Football; Track; Golf; Ice Hockey (2020); Wrestling | Basketball; Softball; Cheerleading; Swimming; Cross Country; Tennis; Golf; Track; Soccer; Volleyball |

Longtime football coach Dave Trosper led the Conner Cougars for nearly two decades before dying in 2025. Known for his dedication to the program and its student-athletes, Trosper built a respected reputation in Kentucky high school football. Under his leadership, Conner regularly competed at a high level within the KHSAA. His legacy left a lasting impact on the school and community.

== Performing arts ==
Conner High School is home to several different performing arts programs, most notably its music program which encompasses string orchestral music performance, vocal music performance, marching band, color guard, jazz band, percussion ensemble, and pep band.

== Notable alumni ==
- Jason Johnson - MLB pitcher
- Pat O'Brien - Lead Guitarist of top selling American Death Metal band, Cannibal Corpse
- Tyler Brockman - Boone County Sheriff's Deputy involved in high-profile death of teen Sammantha Ramsey

== See also ==
- Boone County Schools
- Conner Middle School
