= George Floyd Law Enforcement Trust and Integrity Act =

US proposed legislation

George Floyd Law Enforcement Trust and Integrity Act of 2020
- Acronyms (colloquial): LEITA
- Enacted by: the 116th United States Congress
- Number of co-sponsors: 133

Legislative history
- Committee consideration by House Judiciary

The George Floyd Law Enforcement Trust and Integrity Act of 2020 (LETIA) is a subtitle of the Justice in Policing Act of 2020 which aims to reduce the prevalence of police brutality by fostering connections between police departments and communities. The bill also calls for national policing standards and accreditations. The bill died in committee.

The bill was co-sponsored by Jerry Nadler (D-NY), Ilhan Omar (D-MN), Jason Crow (D-CO), and Karen Bass (D-CA). It was introduced to the House Judiciary Committee by chairman Nadler and Minnesota representative Omar following the murder of George Floyd and subsequent protests. Subsequently, the bill was adjoined to the Omnibus Justice in Policing Act of 2020 at the bills announcement on June 8.

The bill was reintroduced to the 117th congress in 2021.(H.R. 1570 and S. 1700)

== Provisions ==
- The bill creates a platform from which the Attorney General creates and codifies a uniform set of procedures for Police Officer conduct.
- The bill sets requirements for receiving federal funds appropriated under Omnibus Crime Control and Safe Streets Act of 1968 by setting minimums for training spending.
- The bill mandates studies of training procedures and the creation and partaking in certain pilot programs as a prerequisite for receipt of funds
- The bill reforms hiring practices of law enforcement agencies

== See also ==
- Kettling § United States
