= Ignition =

Ignition may refer to:

== Science and technology ==
- Firelighting, the human act of creating a fire for warmth, cooking and other uses
- Combustion, an exothermic chemical reaction between a fuel and an oxidant
- Fusion ignition, the point at which a nuclear fusion reaction becomes self-sustaining
- Ignition SCADA, software by Inductive Automation
- Ignition! An Informal History of Liquid Rocket Propellants, a book by John Drury Clark

== Arts and entertainment ==
- Ignition (video game), a top-down racing game for PC published in 1997
- Ignition (2001 film), directed by Yves Simoneau
- Ignition Entertainment, a computer video games company founded in 2002
- Ignition Management, a music management company founded in 1983, with offices in London and Los Angeles
- Ignition! An Informal History of Liquid Rocket Propellants, a book by John Drury Clark published in 1972

=== Music ===
==== Albums and EPs ====
- Ignition (B1A4 album), 2012
- Ignition (Darude album), 2001
- Ignition (John Waite album), 1982
- Ignition (Mark Boals album), 1998
- Ignition (Nicky Romero album), 2014
- Ignition (The Offspring album), 1992
- Ignition (The Music Machine album)
- Ignition!, album by Brian Setzer, 2001
- Ignition, an album by American rapper X-Raided, 2007
- Ignition (EP), a 2012 EP by Unisonic

=== Songs ===
- "Ignition", a 2001 song by Nebula from the album Charged
- "Ignition (Remix)", a 2002 song by R. Kelly
- "Ignition", a song by Trivium from the album The Crusade, 2006
- "Ignition", a song by tobyMac from the album Portable Sounds, 2007–08
- "Ignition", a 2013 song by Dutch DJ and producer Nicky Romero.

== Vehicles ==
- Ignition system, a method for activating and controlling the combustion of fuel in an internal combustion engine.
- Ignition switch, a switch in the control system of a motor vehicle that activates the main electrical systems for the vehicle.

== Other uses ==
- Ignition (event), a Burning Man regional event held in Montreal, Quebec, Canada

== See also ==
- National Ignition Facility, fusion research facility at the Lawrence Livermore National Laboratory in Livermore, California, US
- Ignition coil, an induction coil in an automobile's ignition system that raises the battery's voltage to the levels necessary for a spark to ignite the fuel
- High energy ignition, an electronic ignition system used by General Motors from 1974 to the mid-1980s
- Ignition interlock device, a method for preventing a vehicle's engine starting if a driver is over the legal alcohol limit
- Ignite (disambiguation)
- Flammability limit
- Lower flammable limit
