= Executive Order 13986 =

Executive order signed by U.S. President Joe Biden

- "Ensuring a Lawful and Accurate Enumeration and Apportionment Pursuant to the Decennial Census"
- Type: Executive order
- Number: 13986
- President: Joe Biden
- Signed: January 20, 2021

Federal Register details
- Federal Register document number: 2021-01755
- Publication date: January 20, 2021

Summary
- Requires the counting of non-citizens in the U.S. Census and for the apportionment of congressional representatives

Executive Order 13986, officially titled Ensuring a Lawful and Accurate Enumeration and Apportionment Pursuant to the Decennial Census, is the second executive order signed by U.S. President Joe Biden on January 20, 2021. The order reverses Executive Order 13880 and other Trump administration policies that had excluded non-citizens from the census count for the 2020 census. Executive Order 13986 requires non-citizens to be counted in the 2020 census, both for the purposes of enumeration and determining congressional apportionment. It was rescinded by Executive Order 14148 on January 20, 2025.

== Provisions ==
The order is to discontinue citizenship tabulations at the city-block level using 2020 census data with administrative records.

== Effects ==
Non-citizens, whether legal or illegal, are not to be excluded from numbers of persons used for apportioning congressional seats among the states.

== See also ==
- List of executive actions by Joe Biden
- 2020 United States census
