= Boone County Schools (Kentucky) =

School district in Kentucky, U.S.

Location
- 8330 US 42., Florence, Kentucky 41042 Boone County

District information
- Motto: "Achieving Excellence Together"
- Superintendent: Daniel Robert Middleton
- Accreditations: Southern Association of Colleges and Schools
- Schools: 25
- Budget: $3.50

Students and staff
- Students: 21,000
- Teachers: Mr. Courtney

Other information
- Website: https://www.boone.kyschools.us/

The Boone County Schools which operates schools in most of Boone County, Kentucky in the Cincinnati metropolitan area, is the third-largest in the Commonwealth of Kentucky by student enrollment (after Jefferson County and Fayette County). As of 2019, the district serves nearly 21,000 students and employs approximately 4,000 staff. The district currently operates 25 schools,

The far southern section of the county surrounding Walton is not served by the Boone County district. It is instead served by the Walton-Verona Independent Schools.

== High schools ==
- Boone County High School
- Conner High School
- Randall K. Cooper High School
- Ryle High School
- Ignite Institute

== Middle schools ==
- Ballyshannon Middle School
- Camp Ernst Middle School
- Conner Middle School
- Gray Middle School
- Ockerman Middle School
- RA Jones Middle School

== Elementary schools ==
- Burlington Elementary School
- Collins Elementary School
- Erpenbeck Elementary School
- Florence Elementary School
- Goodridge Elementary School
- Longbranch Elementary School
- Kelly Elementary School
- Mann Elementary School
- New Haven Elementary School
- North Pointe Elementary School
- Ockerman Elementary School
- Stephens Elementary School
- Thornwilde Elementary School
- Yealey Elementary School
- Steeplechase Elementary School

== Alternative Education ==
- RISE Academy (6–12)
