= Executive Order 13987 =

Executive order signed by U.S. President Joe Biden

- "Organizing and Mobilizing the United States Government to Provide a Unified and Effective Response to Combat COVID-19 and to Provide United States Leadership on Global Health and Security"
- Type: Executive order
- Number: 13987
- President: Joe Biden
- Signed: January 20, 2021

Federal Register details
- Federal Register document number: 2021-01759
- Publication date: January 20, 2021

Summary
- The order indicates that the federal government will respond to the COVID-19 Pandemic in a more coordinated manner and that federal rules would be published in the near future.

Repealed by
- Executive Order 14155, Executive Order 14148, "Withdrawing the United States from the World Health Organization", January 20, 2025; January 20, 2025

Executive Order 13987, officially titled Organizing and Mobilizing the United States Government to Provide a Unified and Effective Response to Combat COVID-19 and to Provide United States Leadership on Global Health and Security, is the third executive order signed by U.S. president Joe Biden on January 20, 2021. The order indicates that the federal government will respond to the COVID-19 pandemic in a more coordinated manner and that federal rules will be published in the near future. It was rescinded by Donald Trump within hours of his assuming office on January 20, 2025.

== Provisions ==
Within the Executive Office of the President, this order established the positions of Coordinator of the COVID-19 Response and Counselor to the President (COVID-19 Response Coordinator), as well as the position of the Deputy Coordinator of the COVID-19 Response within the Executive Office of the President. The COVID-19 Response Coordinator will report directly to the President and advise, assist in responding to COVID-19, coordinate all the elements for the COVID-19 Reaction, and fulfill other tasks under the direction of the president, including the reduction of disparities between the COVID-19 Response and treatment. The order further directs the assistant to the President for National Security Affairs to assemble the National Security Council Principals Committee to coordinate the activities of the federal government to deal with and advise the President on the worldwide response and recuperation from COVID-19. The order establishes a National Security Council Directorate on Global Health Security and Biodefense. Finally, the Order requires heads of agencies to bring the COVID-19 response obstacles to the attention of the COVID-19 Response Coordinator, who, when required, the President will provide guidance.

The Order established the White House COVID-19 Response Team.

== Effects ==
The order is concerned with employment, as the role of Coordinator of the COVID-19 Response and presidential advisor directly influences the norms established for companies to follow in the aftermath of the epidemic.

== See also ==
- List of executive actions by Joe Biden
- 2020 United States census
