= List of killings by law enforcement officers in the United States, April 2014 =

This is a list of people reported killed by non-military law enforcement officers in the United States in April 2014, whether in the line of duty or not, and regardless of reason or method. The listing documents the occurrence of a death, making no implications regarding wrongdoing or justification on the part of the person killed or officer involved. Killings are arranged by date of the incident that caused death. Different death dates, if known, are noted in the description. The table below lists 91 people.

== April 2014 ==
Date	Name (Age) of Deceased	Race	State (City)	Description
2014-04-30	Dontre Hamilton (31)	Black	Wisconsin (Milwaukee)	Christopher Manney shot Dontre Hamilton 14 times. Manney was fired from the police department in October 2014.
2014-04-30	Michael Conley (47)	White	Oregon (Salem)	Officer David Baker responded to a domestic dispute and found Conley armed with a knife. Conley allegedly advanced on Baker, who fatally shot him in the head.
2014-04-29	Jeremy Arnold (37)	White	Washington (Spokane)	Arnold returned to the scene of a murder in which he was a suspect, drove through a barricade, and stepped out with what appeared to be a gun. Officers fired and killed him some 20 yards from a group of reporters and photographers.
2014-04-29	Daniel Ibarra (26)	Hispanic	California (Los Angeles)	
2014-04-29	Dion Julius Brown (22)	Black	North Carolina (Tabor City)	
2014-04-29	Herbert Earl Green (46)	Unknown race	Nevada (Las Vegas)	Officers shot down Green during a barricade situation at a home.
2014-04-29	Name Withheld	Unknown race	Michigan (Detroit)	
2014-04-29	Amber Noelle Smith (27)	White	Mississippi (Brandon)	
2014-04-28	Tere David King (55)	White	Oregon (Athena)	
2014-04-28	Victor Coleman (53)	White	California (Oroville)	
2014-04-27	Jason Conoscenti (36)	White	California (Long Beach)	
2014-04-26	Samantha Ramsey (19)	White	Kentucky (Boone County)	A deputy responding to a field party is hit by Samantha Ramsey's car. After jumping on the hood of the car he fires four bullets through the windshield, hitting and killing Ramsey. The Ramsey family raised a wrongful death complaint against Brockman and the Sheriff's Department, in April 2015.
2014-04-26	Norford, Clyde (31)		Charlotte Amalie, U.S. Virgin Islands	Police shot Norford following an interaction, after officers were informed Norford had a firearm.
2014-04-26	Kandice M. Honiker (27)	Unknown race	California (Merced)	
2014-04-25	Tyrone Davis (43)	Black	Mississippi (Natchez)	
2014-04-25	Emmanuel Wooten (20)	Black	Mississippi (Meridian)	
2014-04-25	Joe Huff (86)	Black	Illinois (Chicago)	
2014-04-25	Salvador Palencia-Cruz (42)	Hispanic	California (Los Angeles)	
2014-04-24	Ingrid Mayer (55)	White	South Carolina (Lancaster)	
2014-04-23	Jesus Chacon (26)	Hispanic	Arizona (Goodyear)	
2014-04-23	James Franklin Ransom (55)	Unknown race	North Carolina (Ararat)	
2014-04-23	Elijah Lee Waltman (53)	Unknown race	Arkansas (Walnut Ridge)	
2014-04-22	Poplos, William		Florida (Merritt Island)	
2014-04-22	Darrell Joseph Legnon (26)	White	Texas (Cushing)	
2014-04-22	Frank Charles Johnston (53)	White	Alabama (Anniston)	
2014-04-22	Donald Letterle	White	Illinois (Lincoln)	
2014-04-21	Mickey Larragoitiy (58)	White	California (Sun City)	
2014-04-21	Mary Hawkes (19)	White	New Mexico (Albuquerque)	A young woman suspected of auto theft was shot and killed by Albuquerque police officer Jeremy Dear following a foot chase. Officer Dear was fired in December 2014 for repeatedly not using his body camera.
2014-04-21	Michael Mayo (30)	White	Texas (Dallas)	After a high-speed chase, SWAT officers shot and killed the armed Mayo.
2014-04-21	Warren Gary Cook (56)	White	Ohio (South Lebanon)	
2014-04-21	Siale Angilau (25)	Native Hawaiian or Pacific Islander	Utah (Salt Lake City)	
2014-04-21	Adrian Williams (29)	Black	Pennsylvania (Wilkinsburg)	
2014-04-20	Brandon Leonel Monroy (20)	White	Texas (Lubbock)	
2014-04-20	Lee Redoux (30)	White	Texas (San Antonio)	
2014-04-19	Francisco Alvarado-Cota (50)	Hispanic	California (Fresno)	
2014-04-19	Karina Sandoval-Jiminez (18)	Hispanic	Oklahoma (Tulsa)	
2014-04-18	Adrian Parra (19)	Hispanic	California (Salton City)	
2014-04-17	Kimberlee "Kim" Carmack (42)	White	Indiana (Indianapolis)	Sgt. Ryan Anders, an officer on administrative leave for alleged domestic violence, broke into the home of his estranged wife, Kim Carmack, also an officer, and killed her and then himself.
2014-04-17	James Kubera (57)	White	Texas (Grapevine)	
2014-04-17	Santiago Avila (35)	Hispanic	Arizona (Tucson)	
2014-04-17	Leighton C. Fitz (25)	White	Iowa (Iowa Falls)	
2014-04-16	Martin G. Brown (52)	White	Missouri (St. Charles)	
2014-04-16	Ottis Eugene Bass (49)	White	Mississippi (Nettleton)	
2014-04-16	Jason Lewis (40)	White	Texas (Houston)	
2014-04-16	Claudell Webb Jr. (23)	Black	Missouri (Fenton)	
2014-04-15	Michael C. Nichols Jr. (48)	Black	Louisiana (Hammond)	
2014-04-14	Ross Chrisman (24)	White	Florida (Bradenton)	
2014-04-14	William Peyton "Billy" Ayers (45)	White	Mississippi (Corinth)	
2014-04-13	Deborah Colbert (53)	White	California (Santa Clara)	
2014-04-13	Vincent John Farrand (38)	White	Utah (Centerville)	
2014-04-13	Edward Michael Caruth (38)	White	Arizona (Glendale)	
2014-04-13	Jose Maldonado (22)	Hispanic	Connecticut (East Hartford)	
2014-04-13	Maynard Paul Thomas (67)	White	North Carolina (Hampstead)	Neighbors say police were called after Thomas crashed a golf cart into his neighbor's garage. A trooper arrived at Thomas's house and shot Thomas multiple times after he allegedly pointed a gun at the trooper. Witnesses at the scene reported that officers approached without lights on and did not ring the doorbell, and that Thomas was not aware that they were police.
2014-04-13	Charles A. Brown IV (20)	Black	Illinois (Harvey)	
2014-04-13	Lauro Jesus Avechuco (40)	Hispanic	Arizona (Sierra Vista)	Officer Justin Dannels stopped Avechuco for speeding. After stopping briefly, Avechuco fled into a nearby neighborhood and stopped again in the 3900 block of Mahonia Place. At this point, police say, Avechuco accelerated his vehicle toward Dannels, who fired his sidearm several times, killing Avechuco.
2014-04-13	Richard Ramirez (38)	Hispanic	Montana (Billings)	Ramirez was pulled over in a car occupied by three others, in which he was a backseat passenger in. Billings PD Officer Grant Morrison told Ramirez to put his hands up at least twice and claimed that he was moving his hands a lot. Morrison fired three shots at Ramirez, and continued to tell him to put his hands up and lay on the seats. Ramirez later died. Morrison claimed that he thought Ramirez had a weapon on him. On January 7, 2015, a grand jury declined to indict Morrison of a crime, and the shooting was considered by prosecutors to be justified.
2014-04-13	Eddie "Dougie" Phongsavad (45)	Asian	California (Los Angeles)	
2014-04-12	Jack Calvello (86)	White	New York (New York)	
2014-04-12	Stephen McKenney (66)	White	Maine (Windham)	
2014-04-12	Gary Burdine (41)	White	Kentucky (Verona)	Police responded to a call of an intoxicated man. As they were leaving, he followed them and brandished a gun. An officer fired, killing him.
2014-04-12	Rolando H. Villanueva (24)	Hispanic	Washington (Yakima)	The deceased suspect has been identified as Rolando H. Villanueva, 24, of Yakima. He rammed police cars after his vehicle got free from being stuck in rocks during a pursuit.
2014-04-11	Thomas Eugene Fillingim (53)	White	Florida (Pensacola)	
2014-04-11	Dennis Doty (45)	White	Georgia (Woodstock)	
2014-04-11	Jefferson Duncan (32)	White	Arizona (Phoenix)	
2014-04-11	Jameel Kareem Ofurum Harrison (34)	Black	Maryland (Owings Mills)	
2014-04-11	Gregory Lewis Towns Jr (24)	Black	Georgia (East Point)	
2014-04-10	David M. Zehring (30)	White	Kansas (Wichita)	
2014-04-10	John Winkler (30)	White	California (Los Angeles)	Three deputies fired at Winkler, killing him, when he fled from an apartment where he had been held captive. The alleged attacker, who has been charged with attempted murder and torture, had been holding his roommate and two others in the apartment. Winkler and another man were running out the door when deputies arrived. Police say they found the attacker assaulting the third victim inside the apartment after they killed Winkler. Winkler's family tentatively reached a settlement with the county of Los Angeles in April 2015.
2014-04-10	Robert James Vancamp (23)	White	California (Clovis)	Fresno County sheriff's deputies shot and killed a 23-year-old man early Thursday at a home in a rural area east of Buchanan High School.
2014-04-09	Ever Ramon Martinez (29)	Hispanic	California (Vallejo)	
2014-04-08	James Calvin Youngblood (28)	White	South Carolina (Fort Mill)	
2014-04-08	Abbott S. Bennett (66)	White	Florida (St. Augustine)	
2014-04-08	Travis Doering (40)	White	Nevada (Las Vegas)	More details have been released into the most recent officer-involved shooting in Las Vegas.
2014-04-07	Daniel Pedroza (24)	Hispanic	California (Oceanside)	
2014-04-07	Hector Hernandez (21)	Hispanic	Illinois (Chicago)	
2014-04-07	Tinoris Williams (31)	Black	Florida (West Palm Beach)	
2014-04-07	Daniel Christoph Yealu (29)	Black	California (Los Angeles)	
2014-04-07	John Nightingale (36)	White	Illinois (Wauconda)	
2014-04-06	Isaac Little (33)	Unknown race	Washington, DC	
2014-04-06	Wesley Mallory White (34)	White	Texas (Conroe)	
2014-04-05	Remis M. Andrews (38)	Black	Massachusetts (Boston)	
2014-04-05	Robert Antonio Jones (24)	Black	Maryland (Coral Hills)	Police heard gunshots and saw Jones walking away holding his side. When they approached him, he reached for a gun in his waistband. One officer shot him; he died in hospital.
2014-04-04	Matthew Troy Pollow (28)	White	Florida (Boco Raton)	
2014-04-04	Michael J. Santiago (35)	Hispanic	Vermont (Brattleboro)	On April 4, Santiago, 35, of Brattleboro, was shot and killed by Brattleboro Police Department Sgt. Mark Carignan during the service of a search warrant on Room 301 of America's Best Inn on Putney Road. The search warrant was obtained as the result of an ongoing drug investigation and authorized police to search the room for drugs and Santiago.
2014-04-04	Codi Ben Bullard (26)	White	Texas (Dallas)	
2014-04-04	Jairo Armando Pedraza (24)	Hispanic	California (Los Angeles)	
2014-04-04	William Arthur Stogner Jr. (52)	White	Alabama (Huntsville)	
2014-04-03	Cody Spafford (26)	White	Washington (Seattle)	Spafford was suspected of an armed bank robbery earlier in the day. After a two-and-a-half hour manhunt, police located him. According to police, he brandished a knife and charged at them. Spafford was shot multiple times.
2014-04-03	Dustin Keith Glover (27)	Black	Texas (Port Arthur)	
2014-04-03	Stanley "Laransie" Whitman (41)	White	Tennessee (Richard City)	
2014-04-02	Marcus Garner (22)	Black	Georgia (Lawrenceville)	

== See also ==
- Death in custody § United States
- Henry A. Wallace Police Crime Public Database
- List of cases of police brutality
- List of countries with annual rates and counts for killings by law enforcement officers
- List of law enforcement officers killed in the line of duty in the United States
- List of law enforcement officers convicted for an on-duty killing in the United States
- List of shootings by US immigration agents
- List of police reforms related to the George Floyd protests
- List of unarmed African Americans killed by law enforcement officers in the United States
- Lists of killings by law enforcement officers
- Police brutality in the United States
- Police misconduct § United States
- Police riot § United States
- Police use of deadly force in the United States
