= Executive Order 14006 =

Executive order signed by U.S. President Joe Biden

- Reforming Our Incarceration System to Eliminate the Use of Privately Operated Criminal Detention Facilities

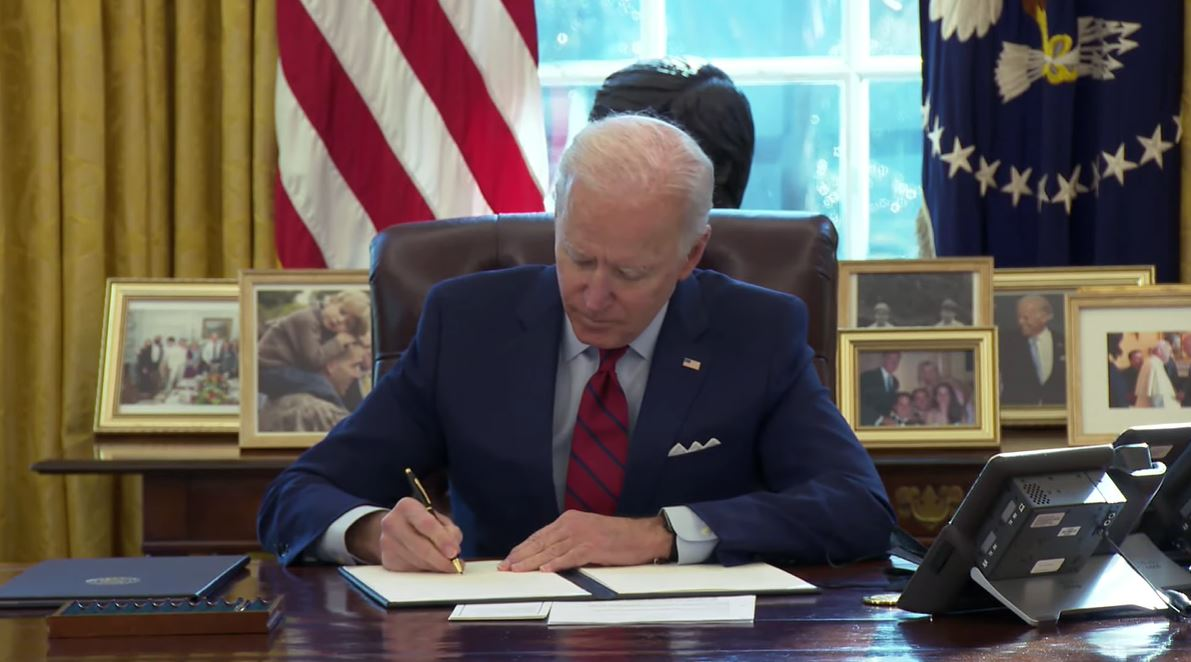
- President Biden signs a series of Executive Orders amongst which was Executive Order 14006 shortly after his inauguration on January 20, 2021.
- Type: Executive order
- Number: 14006
- President: Joe Biden
- Signed: January 26, 2021

Federal Register details
- Federal Register document number: 2021-02070
- Publication date: January 26, 2021

Summary
- Requires that the Department of Justice does not renew contracts with privately-operated prisons.

Executive Order 14006, officially titled Reforming Our Incarceration System to Eliminate the Use of Privately Operated Criminal Detention Facilities, is an executive order signed by U.S. President Joe Biden on January 26, 2021. Under this order, Department of Justice would not renew any existing contracts with privately operated prisons. This order was rescinded as a part of U.S. President Donald Trump's "Initial Rescissions of Harmful Executive Orders and Actions" executive order on January 20, 2025.

== Effects ==
It aimed to gradually abolish the US government's reliance on privately operated detention facilities as they tend to not have the same level of safety as state-owned ones.

== See also ==
- Incarceration in the United States#Privatization
- List of executive actions by Joe Biden
- Prison–industrial complex
