= George Floyd Justice in Policing Act =

Bill in the United States Congress

George Floyd Justice in Policing Act of 2021
- Long title: To hold law enforcement accountable for misconduct in court, improve transparency through data collection, and reform police training and policies.
- Announced in: the 117th United States Congress
- Number of co-sponsors: 199

Legislative history
- Introduced in the House as H.R. 1280 by Karen Bass (D–CA) on February 24, 2021; Committee consideration by House Judiciary; Passed the House on March 3, 2021 (220–212)

The George Floyd Justice in Policing Act of 2021 was a policing reform bill drafted by Democrats in the United States Congress, following the murder of George Floyd. The legislation was introduced in the United States House of Representatives on February 24, 2021. The legislation aims to combat police misconduct, excessive force, and racial bias in policing.

The bill passed the Democratic-controlled House of Representatives on a mostly party-line vote of 220–212, but not the evenly divided but Democratic-controlled Senate amid opposition from Republicans. Negotiations between Republican and Democratic senators on a reform bill collapsed in September 2021.

== Background ==
The drafting of the legislation was preceded by a series of protests following the murder of George Floyd in Minnesota and other high-profile killings of African Americans at the hands of police officers and civilians in 2020, such as the shooting of Breonna Taylor in Kentucky. The proposed legislation contains some provisions that civil rights advocates have long sought, and is named in Floyd's honor.

== Provisions ==
The legislation, described as expansive, would:

- Grant power to the Justice Department's Civil Rights Division to issue subpoenas to police departments as part of "pattern or practice" investigations into whether there has been a "pattern and practice" of bias or misconduct by the department
- Provide grants to state attorneys general to "create an independent process to investigate misconduct or excessive use of force" by police forces
- Establish a federal registry of police misconduct complaints and disciplinary actions
- Enhance accountability for police officers who commit misconduct, by restricting the application of the qualified immunity doctrine for local and state officers, and by changing the mens rea (intent) element of 18 U.S.C. § 242 (the federal criminal offense of "deprivation of rights under color of law," which has been used to prosecute police for misconduct) from "willfully" to "knowingly or with reckless disregard"
- Require federal uniformed police officers to have body-worn cameras
- Require marked federal police vehicles to be equipped with dashboard cameras.
- Require state and local law enforcement agencies that receive federal funding to "ensure" the use of body-worn and dashboard cameras.
- Restrict the transfer of military equipment to police (see 1033 program, militarization of police)
- Require state and local law enforcement agencies that receive federal funding to adopt anti-discrimination policies and training programs, including those targeted at fighting racial profiling
- Prohibit federal police officers from using chokeholds or other carotid holds (which led to the death of Eric Garner), and require state and local law enforcement agencies that receive federal funding to adopt the same prohibition
- Prohibit the issuance of no-knock warrants (warrants that allow police to conduct a raid without knocking or announcing themselves) in federal drug investigations, and provide incentives to the states to enact a similar prohibition.
- Change the threshold for the permissible use of force by federal law enforcement officers from "reasonableness" to only when "necessary to prevent death or serious bodily injury."
- Mandate that federal officers use deadly force only as a last resort and that de-escalation be attempted, and condition federal funding to state and local law enforcement agencies on the adoption of the same policy.

== Legislative history ==
=== Drafting and introduction in 2021 ===
In the House of Representatives, the legislation was principally drafted by Representative Karen Bass of California (who chairs the Congressional Black Caucus) and Representative Jerrold Nadler of New York (who chairs the House Judiciary Committee); in the Senate, the legislation has been drafted by Cory Booker of New Jersey and Kamala Harris of California, the Senate's two black Democrats. The legislation was introduced in the House as H.B. 7120 on June 8, 2021, by Bass, with 165 co-sponsors, all Democrats. The bill was referred to the House Judiciary Committee, and additionally to the House Armed Services Committee and House Energy and Commerce Committee, for consideration of provisions falling within those committees' jurisdiction. The legislation was introduced in the Senate on the same day as S. 3912, by Booker, with 35 cosponsors. It was referred to the Senate Judiciary Committee.

=== Committee hearings ===
At a June 2020 hearing on police issues in the House Judiciary Committee, George Floyd's brother, Philonise Floyd, testified in favor of police reforms. Also testifying were the Floyd family's attorney Benjamin Crump (invited by the Democrats) and Angela Underwood Jacobs (invited by the Republicans), the brother of Federal Protective Service officer David "Patrick" Underwood, who was killed in the line of duty. Committee Republicans invited conservative Fox News commentator and ex-Secret Service agent Dan Bongino, who did not mention police brutality at the hearing and instead focused on dangers faced by police. Committee Republicans also called Darrell C. Scott, a minister and prominent Trump ally, to testify.

At a Senate Judiciary Committee hearing on June 16, members heard testimony from a number of witnesses, including Vanita Gupta of the Leadership Conference on Civil and Human Rights; attorney S. Lee Merritt, who represents the family of Ahmaud Arbery; St. Paul, Minnesota Mayor Melvin Carter; Houston Police Department chief Art Acevedo; and Fraternal Order of Police national president Patrick Yoes. Gupta, who served as head of the U.S. Department of Justice's Civil Rights Division during the Obama administration, testified in favor of police reforms and criticized the Trump Justice Department, while Yoes testified against restricting qualified immunity for police.

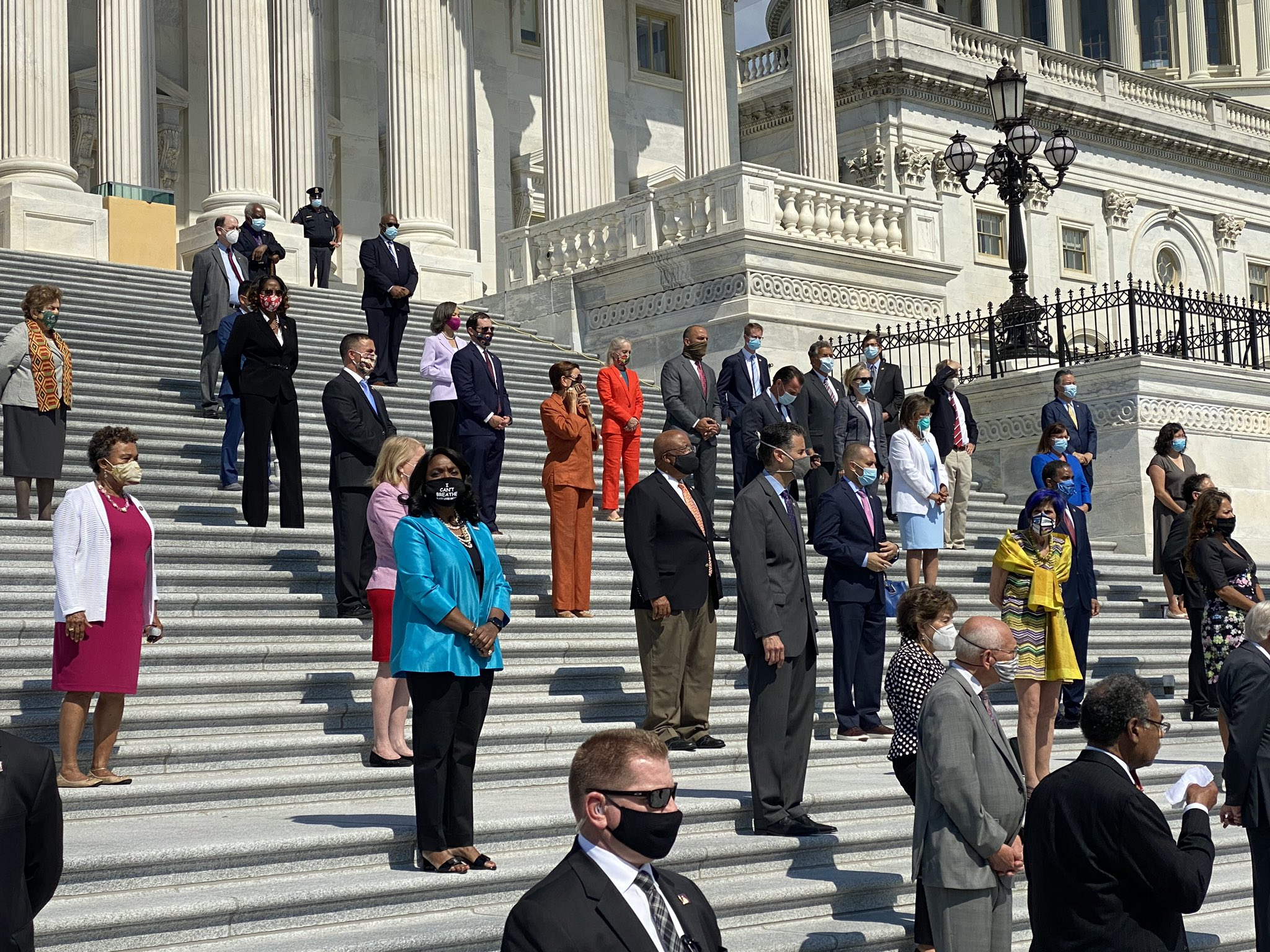
House members after passage of the bill on June 25, 2020

On June 17, 2020, after a nearly 12-hour debate, the House Judiciary Committee advanced the bill to the House floor on a party-line vote (with all Democrats voting yes and all Republicans voting no). On the floor, the bill passed the Democratic-controlled House on a mostly party-line vote of 236–181. The legislation's key sponsors sought to garner support for the bill from moderate Republicans, but ultimately, only three House Republicans (all moderates) joined all House Democrats in voting to pass the bill: Representatives Fred Upton of Michigan, Brian Fitzpatrick of Pennsylvania, and Will Hurd of Texas. The bill could not pass the Republican-controlled Senate.

=== Congressional gridlock and blockage in the Senate ===
The bill never advanced in 2020, due to opposition by Republicans, who then controlled the Senate. Republican senators led by Tim Scott proposed alternative police legislation that was far narrower than the House bill favored by Democrats. The Scott bill would introduce incentives for states and localities to change police practices (by limiting chokeholds and promoting the use of body cameras), but would not restrict the qualified-immunity doctrine, would not ban chokeholds or otherwise federally restrict police use of deadly force, and would not restrict no-knock warrants. Democrats and civil rights organizations oppose the Senate Republican proposal as too weak; Senate Minority Leader Chuck Schumer and Democratic Senators Kamala Harris and Cory Booker (the sponsors of the Senate version of the Justice in Policing Act), called the Republican bill "not salvageable" and "so threadbare and lacking in substance that it does not even provide a proper baseline for negotiations." On June 24, 2020, the Senate Republican proposal failed in a procedural vote of 55–45, on a mostly-party line vote, failing to obtain the 60 votes needed to advance to a floor debate, and thus becoming gridlocked. Democrats called upon Republican Senate Majority Leader Mitch McConnell to enter "bipartisan talks to get to a constructive starting point."

=== Reintroduction in 2021, second House passage, and renewed deadlock ===
The bill was introduced in the 117th Congress on February 24, 2021, as H. R. 1280, the George Floyd Justice in Policing Act of 2021. The bill was sponsored by Bass and co-sponsored by 199 other Representatives (all Democrats). It passed the House on a nearly-party line vote of 220–212 on March 3, 2021. No Republicans supported the legislation. (Note: Lance Gooden, a Republican of Texas, cast the sole Republican "yes" vote on the bill after having "accidentally pressed the wrong voting button and realized it too late"; he later said that he opposed the bill.)

The legislation did not advance in the Senate, bipartisan negotiations took place between Bass, Scott, and Booker, but collapsed by September 2021. Biden repeatedly pushed for the legislation to be advanced; in his April 2021 speech to Congress, Biden praised bipartisan "productive discussions" on police reform and called upon Congress to send him the bill by the one-year anniversary of Floyd's murder. In announcing that negotiations had failed, Booker said that the parties were unable to agree about the fate of qualified immunity for police departments and officers and that Republicans were unwilling to agree to a national database to track police misconduct.

=== Voting summary ===
| Congress | Short title | Bill number(s) | Date introduced | Sponsor(s) | # of cosponsors | Latest status |
|---|---|---|---|---|---|---|
| 116th Congress | George Floyd Justice in Policing Act of 2020 | H.R. 7120 | June 8, 2020 | Karen Bass (D-CA) | 236 | Passed in the House (236–181) |
| 116th Congress | Justice in Policing Act of 2020 | S. 3912 | June 8, 2020 | Cory Booker (D-NJ) | 36 | Died in Committee |
| 117th Congress | George Floyd Justice in Policing Act of 2021 | H.R. 1280 | February 24, 2021 | Karen Bass (D-CA) | 199 | Passed in the House (220–212) |

== Support and opposition ==
=== Support ===
The legislation is endorsed by more than 100 civil rights groups, including the Lawyers' Committee for Civil Rights Under Law, Leadership Conference on Civil and Human Rights, NAACP and NAACP Legal Defense and Educational Fund, National Urban League, Amnesty International, and National Action Network. The American Civil Liberties Union praised the legislation for taking "significant steps to protect people and ensure accountability against police violence" but expressed opposition to providing "hundreds of millions more to law enforcement" and called for more sweeping changes to "the role of police in our society fundamentally."

The legislation is supported by former President Joe Biden and former Vice President Kamala Harris.

=== Opposition ===
Police unions and other organizations representing police oppose the bill. Police organizations are influential in Congress, exerting influence through campaign contributions, endorsements, and lobbying and advocacy efforts, and historically have been successful in stymieing reform legislation.

President Donald Trump opposed the bill, and in 2020, he issued a formal pledge to veto the legislation if it passed Congress and contending that the bill is "overbroad" and would "weaken the ability of law enforcement agencies to reduce crime." Trump specifically opposed proposals to restrict qualified immunity.

Zack Smith of the conservative Heritage Foundation contends that the bill uses a faulty definition of "racial profiling" that "would essentially establish a de facto quota system for traffic stops, pedestrian stops, interviews, and other investigatory activities, and could encourage officers and departments to 'game the system' by stopping more individuals with certain types of characteristics—specifically, women, whites, or Asians—than they otherwise would." This criticism has also been echoed by conservative lawyer Peter Kirsanow.

== Executive orders ==
On May 25, 2022, the second anniversary of Floyd's murder, President Biden signed Executive Order 14074 which attempted to enact some of the reforms in the bill on a more limited scope. This was rescinded by President Trump's Executive Order 14148 on January 20, 2025, reversing some but not all of the changes (e.g. deactivating the National Law Enforcement Accountability Database but not undoing the policies that require body cameras).

== See also ==
- List of police reforms related to the George Floyd protests
- George Floyd protests
