= Executive Order 14074 =

American presidential directive

- Executive Order on Advancing Effective, Accountable Policing and Criminal Justice Practices to Enhance Public Trust and Public Safety

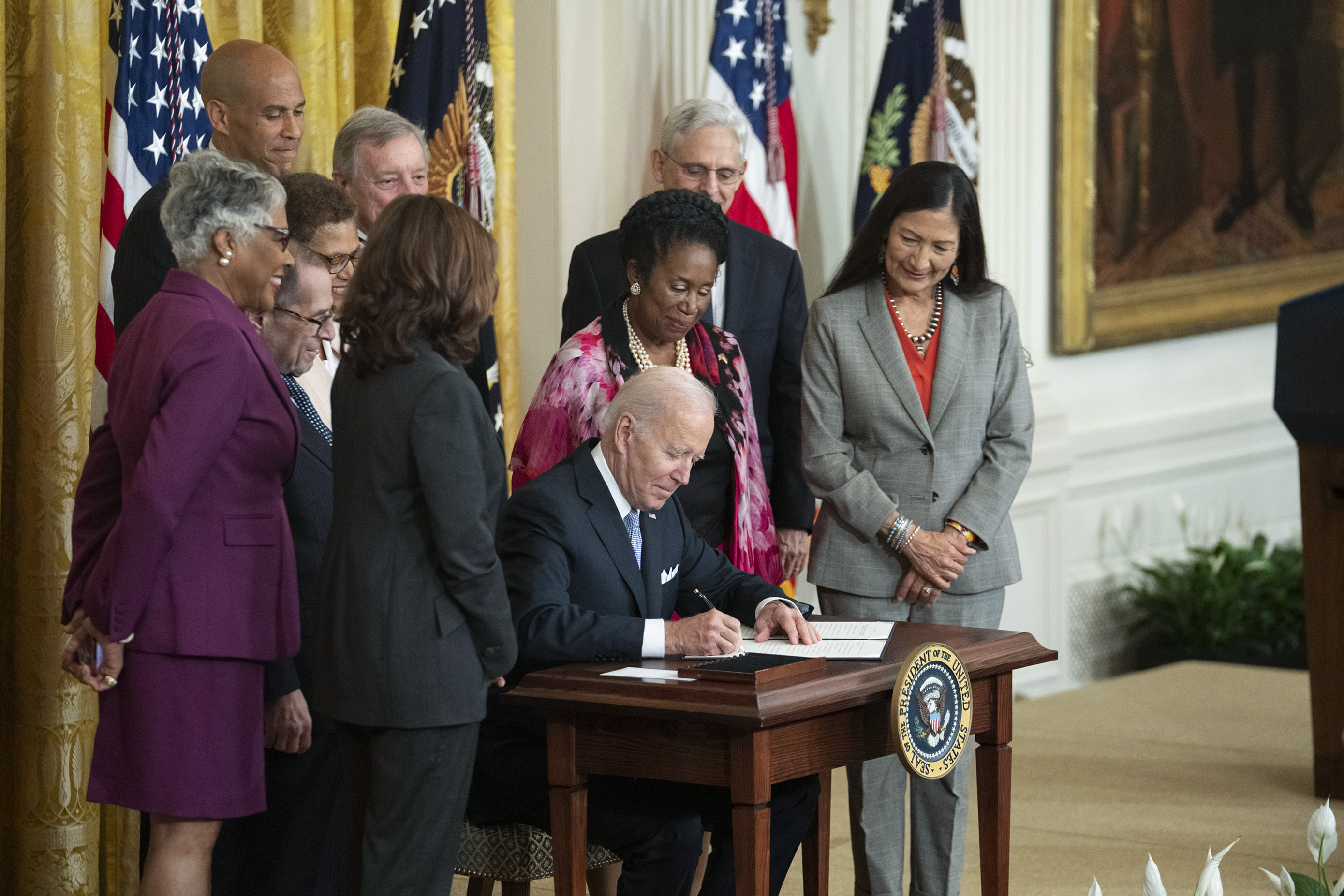
- President Biden signing the executive order in the East Room of the White House on May 25, 2022
- Type: Executive order
- Number: 14074
- President: Joe Biden
- Signed: May 25, 2022

Federal Register details
- Federal Register document number: 2022-11810
- Publication date: May 25, 2022

Summary
- Alters criminal justice practices, stressing necessity for fair policing of black and brown communities.

Executive Order 14074 in the United States calls for altering criminal justice and policing practices. The order was signed by President Joe Biden on May 25, 2022. It begins by explaining the intentions of this order, "public trust" and fair policing. It stresses the necessity of trust and fair policing, particularly in black and brown communities (since there is frequently conflict with the police in these communities). This executive order was revoked by President Trump on January 20, 2025.

The provisions included attempting to restrict no-knock warrants to being less frequent, and attempted to "strengthen officer recruitment, hiring, promotion, and retention practices". The order required federal agencies to ban chokeholds and other tactics and encourages training for de-escalation techniques via federal grants. The order also created the National Law Enforcement Accountability Database, which documented officer misconduct. It was signed on the second anniversary of the murder of George Floyd by Minneapolis police, after Congress failed to pass the George Floyd Justice in Policing Act.

President Donald Trump rescinded Executive Order 14074 on January 20, 2025 with Executive Order 14148 - the first day of his second (non-consecutive) term.

== Links ==
- The full text of Executive Order 14074 at Wikisource
- Whitehouse.gov
- Executive Order on Advancing Effective, Accountable Policing and Criminal Justice Practices to Enhance Public Trust and Public Safety
