= Executive Order 14019 =

Executive order promoting voting access

- Promoting Access to Voting
- Executive Order 14019 in the Federal Register
- Type: Executive order
- Number: 14019
- President: Joe Biden
- Signed: March 7, 2021

Federal Register details
- Federal Register document number: 2021-05087
- Publication date: March 7, 2021

Executive Order 14019, titled Promoting Access to Voting was an executive order issued by President Joe Biden on March 7, 2021.

The order was announced on March 7, 2021, the 56th anniversary of "Bloody Sunday", an incident during the 1965 Selma to Montgomery marches.

The order faced criticism from some members of the Republican Party in the build-up to the 2024 United States presidential election. Representative Claudia Tenney claimed that the order "requires our taxpayer-funded federal agencies to violate the Hatch Act and engage in illegal vote harvesting".

It was revoked in 2025 by President Donald Trump.
