= Executive Order 13985 =

Executive order signed by U.S. President Joe Biden

- "Advancing Racial Equity and Support for Underserved Communities Through the Federal Government"

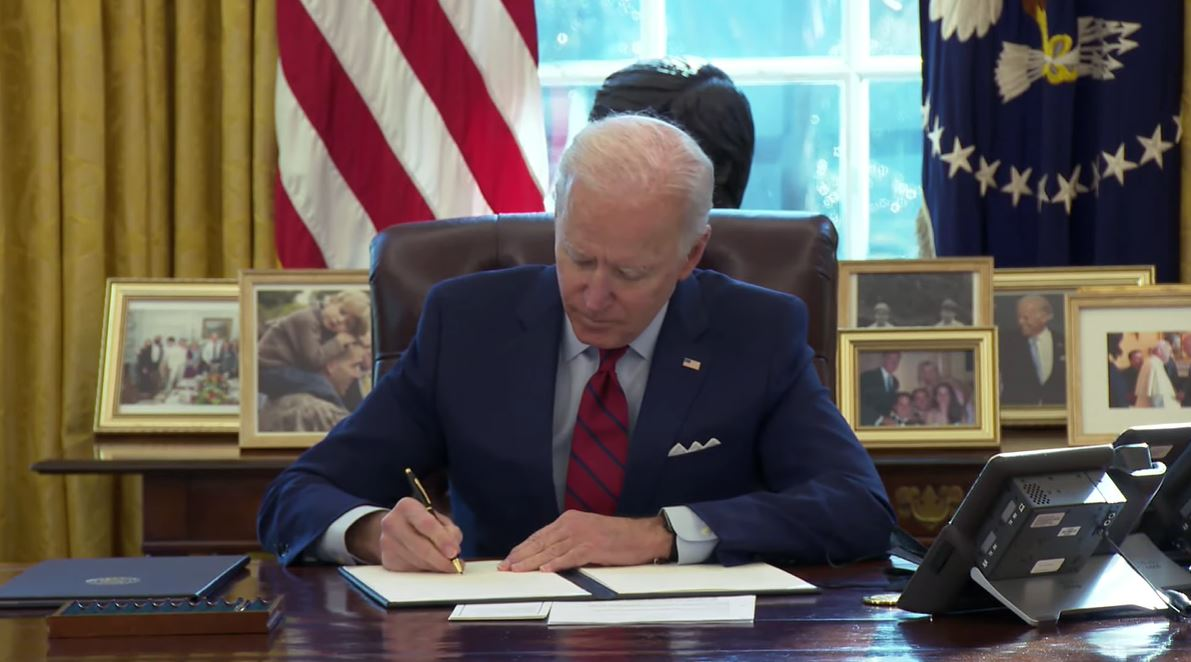
- President Biden signs a series of Executive Orders amongst which was order 13990 shortly after his inauguration on January 20th, 2021.
- Type: Executive order
- Number: 13985
- President: Joe Biden
- Signed: January 20, 2021

Federal Register details
- Federal Register document number: 2021-01753
- Publication date: January 20, 2021

Summary
- Advances racial equity and support for underserved communities through the federal government

Executive Order 13985, officially titled Advancing Racial Equity and Support for Underserved Communities Through the Federal Government, was the first executive order signed by U.S. President Joe Biden on January 20, 2021. It directed the federal government to revise agency policies to account for racial inequities in their implementation. It was rescinded by Donald Trump within hours of his assuming office on January 20, 2025.

== Provisions ==
According to the order, converging economic, health, and climate crises have exposed and exacerbated inequities. The order, therefore, announces that the Biden administration will pursue a comprehensive approach to advancing equity for all, in particular by fighting systemic racism. By promoting the federal government's equality, we can generate chances to strengthen historically neglected neighborhoods that benefit everyone. A study, for instance, suggests that narrowing racial divisions in salaries, home loans, lending possibilities, and access to higher education would equal $5 trillion more in the U.S. economy in the next five years. The federal government's objective to promote equity is to provide everyone the chance to achieve their full potential.

Each agency must examine, in accordance with these goals, whether its programs and policies maintain structural obstacles to opportunities and benefits for persons of color and other under-served groups and what extent. Such evaluations would better enable agencies to formulate policies and programs that provide equitable resources and benefits for all.

== Effects ==
Within sixty days of the date of the order, the heads of federal departments are to consider halting, revising, or rescinding all activity related to or resulting from Donald Trump's Executive Order 13950.

The order established an Interagency Working Group on Equitable Data, consisting of various department heads.

== See also ==
- List of executive actions by Joe Biden
