= Ignitor =

Ignitor may mean:

- A device used to initiate combustion; see Fire making for a list
- Ignitor (band), a heavy metal band from Austin, Texas
- IGNITOR, an Italian nuclear fusion research project
- "The Ignitor", a nickname for Hall of Fame baseball player Paul Molitor
- A playable character in the Skylanders video game franchise

== See also ==
- CodeIgniter, an open-source web framework
- Hot-tube ignitor, part of the ignition system of an internal-combustion engine
- Outside flame ignitor, part of the ignition system of an internal-combustion engine
