= Executive Order 14148 =

January 2025 initial rescissions

- "Initial Rescissions of Harmful Executive Orders and Actions"

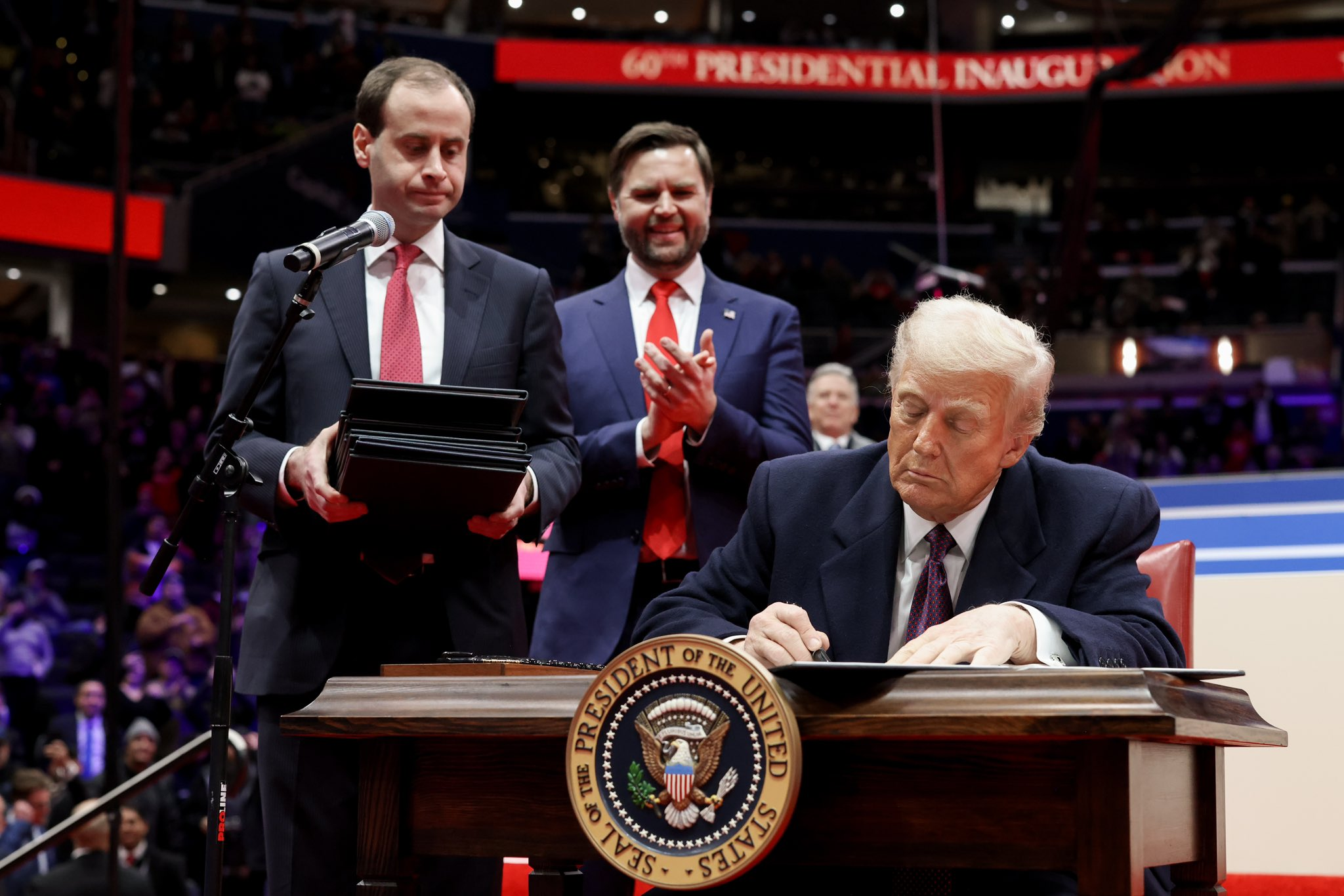
- President Trump, on his first day, signs a series of executive orders amongst which was order 14148 at the Capital One Arena.
- Type: Executive order
- Number: 14148
- President: Donald Trump
- Signed: January 20, 2025

Federal Register details
- Federal Register document number: 2025-01901
- Publication date: January 20, 2025

Summary
- Orders the rescindment of several executive orders enacted during the Biden administration.

Executive Order 14148, titled "Initial Rescissions of Harmful Executive Orders and Actions", is an executive order signed by United States president Donald Trump on January 20, 2025, during the first day of his second presidential term. The order directed the rescindment of several executive orders enacted during the Biden administration.

The main focus of the order was to rescind diversity, equity, and inclusion (DEI) policies in the US Government, specific climate and environmental regulations, and certain border policies.

== Background ==
This was the first of the new President Trump's executive orders and was a mass undoing of the previous president's policies on a wide range of issues. Its core effect was the rescinding of several executive orders ordered by President Biden. It was followed that day by 25 other executive orders covering a wide range of policies and was signed in an open to the public event with attendance by Vice President JD Vance.

== Provisions and effects ==
The executive order explicitly rescinded 68 executive orders and 11 presidential memoranda from the Biden Administration. It also ordered heads of federal agencies to "take immediate steps to end Federal implementation of unlawful and radical DEI ideology". Additionally the order ordered, the Director of the Domestic Policy Council (DPC) and the Director of the National Economic Council (NEC) should review all Federal Government actions taken in accordance to the rescinded orders and take necessary steps to rescind, replace, or amend such actions when appropriate. It also ordered that within 45 days (before March 6), the DPC and NEC Directors should give the President further orders, issued by the prior administration that should be rescinded, as well as a list of "replacement orders, memoranda, or proclamations, to increase American prosperity". Lastly, it ordered the National Security Advisor (NSA) to review all Biden era National Security Memoranda for "harm to national security, domestic resilience, and American values" and within 45 days recommend a list for rescindment.

The rescission of Biden's Executive Order 14074 deactivated the National Law Enforcement Accountability Database which tracked federal police misconduct.

=== DEI ===
In addition to the retraction of DEI policies in the federal government, the order rescinded the following executive orders:

- Executive Order 13985 of January 20, 2021 (Advancing Racial Equity and Support for Underserved Communities Through the Federal Government);
- Executive Order 13993 of January 20, 2021 (Revision of Civil Immigration Enforcement Policies and Priorities);
- Executive Order 14031 of May 28, 2021 (Advancing Equity, Justice, and Opportunity for Asian Americans, Native Hawaiians, and Pacific Islanders);
- Executive Order 14075 of June 15, 2022 (Advancing Equality for Lesbian, Gay, Bisexual, Transgender, Queer, and Intersex Individuals) among many others.
- Executive Order 14020 of March 8, 2021 (Establishment of the White House Gender Policy Council);
- Executive Order 13988 of January 20, 2021 (Preventing and Combating Discrimination on the Basis of Gender Identity or Sexual Orientation).

Executive Order 14020 was rescinded twice, once in this executive order and then again in Defending Women from Gender Ideology Extremism and Restoring Biological Truth to the Federal Government, passed the same day.

=== Climate change and the environment ===
One of Trump's Executive Orders rescinded a Biden Order which rescinded a Trump order which withdrew the United States from the Paris Climate Accords. This chain of orders effectively was a re-leaving of the order, "Putting America First In International Environmental Agreements". The end result being that the United States is no longer a member.

The order dissolved the following councils and offices by rescinding the Executive Order 14008 of January 27, 2021 (Tackling the Climate Crisis at Home and Abroad).

- White House Office of Domestic Climate Policy
- White House Environmental Justice Advisory Council
- National Climate Task Force
- Office of Climate Change and Health Equity

Additionally, it rescinded various environmental regulations enacted by the Biden administration and rescinded an order to establish The Climate Change Support Office.

=== Immigration ===
During his campaign President Trump promised wide-ranging immigration policy changes, the start of which was in this order, in rescinding:

- Executive Order 13993 of January 20, 2021 (Revision of Civil Immigration Enforcement Policies and Priorities);
- Executive Order 14010 of February 2, 2021 (Creating a Comprehensive Regional Framework To Address the Causes of Migration, To Manage Migration Throughout North and Central America, and To Provide Safe and Orderly Processing of Asylum Seekers at the United States Border);
- Executive Order 14011 of February 2, 2021 (Establishment of Interagency Task Force on the Reunification of Families);
- Executive Order 14012 of February 2, 2021 (Restoring Faith in Our Legal Immigration Systems and Strengthening Integration and Inclusion Efforts for New Americans);
- Executive Order 14013 of February 4, 2021 (Rebuilding and Enhancing Programs To Resettle Refugees and Planning for the Impact of Climate Change on Migration).

The orders ended efforts to reunite families and address mass migration from the source. Moreover, it decreased border security efforts.

=== Revoking various revocations ===
One of Biden's Executive Orders (13992) revoked the following Executive Orders from Trump's 1st Presidency and was revoked by this order:

- Executive Order 13771 of January 30, 2017 (Reducing Regulation and Controlling Regulatory Costs);
- Executive Order 13777 of February 24, 2017 (Enforcing the Regulatory Reform Agenda);
- Executive Order 13875 of June 14, 2019 (Evaluating and Improving the Utility of Federal Advisory Committees);
- Executive Order 13891 of October 9, 2019 (Promoting the Rule of Law Through Improved Agency Guidance Documents);
- Executive Order 13892 of October 9, 2019 (Promoting the Rule of Law Through Transparency and Fairness in Civil Administrative Enforcement and Adjudication);
- Executive Order 13893 of October 10, 2019 (Increasing Government Accountability for Administrative Actions by Reinvigorating Administrative PAYGO).

== Full list of explicitly revoked executive orders ==
This is a list of only the executive orders explicitly revoked under section two of Initial Rescissions of Harmful Executive Orders and Actions. Additionally, it does not include the 10 presidential memoranda also rescinded by the order, which were dated March 13, 2023, and January 3, 6, and 14, 2025.

List of revoked executive orders
Executive Order	Date	Title
Executive Order 13985	January 20, 2021	Advancing Racial Equity and Support for Underserved Communities Through the Federal Government
Executive Order 13986	January 20, 2021	Ensuring a Lawful and Accurate Enumeration and Apportionment Pursuant to the Decennial Census
Executive Order 13987	January 20, 2021	Organizing and Mobilizing the United States Government To Provide a Unified and Effective Response To Combat COVID-19 and To Provide United States Leadership on Global Health and Security
Executive Order 13988	January 20, 2021	Preventing and Combating Discrimination on the Basis of Gender Identity or Sexual Orientation
Executive Order 13989	January 20, 2021	Ethics Commitments by Executive Branch Personnel
Executive Order 13990	January 20, 2021	Protecting Public Health and the Environment and Restoring Science To Tackle the Climate Crisis
Executive Order 13992	January 20, 2021	Revocation of Certain Executive Orders Concerning Federal Regulation
Executive Order 13993	January 20, 2021	Revision of Civil Immigration Enforcement Policies and Priorities
Executive Order 13995	January 21, 2021	Ensuring an Equitable Pandemic Response and Recovery
Executive Order 13996	January 21, 2021	Establishing the COVID-19 Pandemic Testing Board and Ensuring a Sustainable Public Health Workforce for COVID-19 and Other Biological Threats
Executive Order 13997	January 21, 2021	Improving and Expanding Access to Care and Treatments for COVID-19
Executive Order 13999	January 21, 2021	Protecting Worker Health and Safety
Executive Order 14000	January 21, 2021	Supporting the Reopening and Continuing Operation of Schools and Early Childhood Education Providers
Executive Order 14002	January 22, 2021	Economic Relief Related to the COVID-19 Pandemic
Executive Order 14003	January 22, 2021	Protecting the Federal Workforce
Executive Order 14004	January 25, 2021	Enabling All Qualified Americans To Serve Their Country in Uniform
Executive Order 14006	January 26, 2021	Reforming Our Incarceration System To Eliminate the Use of Privately Operated Criminal Detention Facilities
Executive Order 14007	January 27, 2021	President’s Council of Advisors on Science and Technology
Executive Order 14008	January 27, 2021	Tackling the Climate Crisis at Home and Abroad
Executive Order 14009	January 28, 2021	Strengthening Medicaid and the Affordable Care Act
Executive Order 14010	February 2, 2021	Creating a Comprehensive Regional Framework To Address the Causes of Migration, To Manage Migration Throughout North and Central America, and To Provide Safe and Orderly Processing of Asylum Seekers at the United States Border
Executive Order 14011	February 2, 2021	Establishment of Interagency Task Force on the Reunification of Families
Executive Order 14012	February 2, 2021	Restoring Faith in Our Legal Immigration Systems and Strengthening Integration and Inclusion Efforts for New Americans
Executive Order 14013	February 4, 2021	Rebuilding and Enhancing Programs To Resettle Refugees and Planning for the Impact of Climate Change on Migration
Executive Order 14015	February 14, 2021	Establishment of the White House Office of Faith-Based and Neighborhood Partnerships
Executive Order 14018	February 24, 2021	Revocation of Certain Presidential Actions
Executive Order 14019	March 7, 2021	Promoting Access to Voting
Executive Order 14020	March 8, 2021	Establishment of the White House Gender Policy Council
Executive Order 14021	March 8, 2021	Guaranteeing an Educational Environment Free From Discrimination on the Basis of Sex, Including Sexual Orientation or Gender Identity
Executive Order 14022	April 1, 2021	Termination of Emergency With Respect to the International Criminal Court
Executive Order 14023	April 9, 2021	Establishment of the Presidential Commission on the Supreme Court of the United States
Executive Order 14027	May 7, 2021	Establishment of the Climate Change Support Office
Executive Order 14029	May 14, 2021	Revocation of Certain Presidential Actions and Technical Amendment
Executive Order 14030	May 20, 2021	Climate-Related Financial Risk
Executive Order 14031	May 28, 2021	Advancing Equity, Justice, and Opportunity for Asian Americans, Native Hawaiians, and Pacific Islanders
Executive Order 14035	June 25, 2021	Diversity, Equity, Inclusion, and Accessibility in the Federal Workforce
Executive Order 14037	August 5, 2021	Strengthening American Leadership in Clean Cars and Trucks
Executive Order 14044	September 13, 2021	Amending Executive Order 14007
Executive Order 14045	September 13, 2021	White House Initiative on Advancing Educational Equity, Excellence, and Economic Opportunity for Hispanics
Executive Order 14049	October 11, 2021	White House Initiative on Advancing Educational Equity, Excellence, and Economic Opportunity for Native Americans and Strengthening Tribal Colleges and Universities
Executive Order 14050	October 19, 2021	White House Initiative on Advancing Educational Equity, Excellence, and Economic Opportunity for Black Americans
Executive Order 14052	November 15, 2021	Implementation of the Infrastructure Investment and Jobs Act
Executive Order 14055	November 18, 2021	Nondisplacement of Qualified Workers Under Service Contracts
Executive Order 14057	December 8, 2021	Catalyzing Clean Energy Industries and Jobs Through Federal Sustainability
Executive Order 14060	December 15, 2021	Establishing the United States Council on Transnational Organized Crime
Executive Order 14069	March 15, 2022	Advancing Economy, Efficiency, and Effectiveness in Federal Contracting by Promoting Pay Equity and Transparency
Executive Order 14070	April 5, 2022	Continuing To Strengthen Americans’ Access to Affordable, Quality Health Coverage
Executive Order 14074	May 25, 2022	Advancing Effective, Accountable Policing and Criminal Justice Practices To Enhance Public Trust and Public Safety
Executive Order 14075	June 15, 2022	Advancing Equality for Lesbian, Gay, Bisexual, Transgender, Queer, and Intersex Individuals
Executive Order 14082	September 12, 2022	Implementation of the Energy and Infrastructure Provisions of the Inflation Reduction Act of 2022
Executive Order 14084	September 30, 2022	Promoting the Arts, the Humanities, and Museum and Library Services
Executive Order 14087	October 14, 2022	Lowering Prescription Drug Costs for Americans
Executive Order 14089	December 13, 2022	Establishing the President’s Advisory Council on African Diaspora Engagement in the United States
Executive Order 14091	February 16, 2023	Further Advancing Racial Equity and Support for Underserved Communities Through the Federal Government
Executive Order 14094	April 6, 2023	Modernizing Regulatory Review
Executive Order 14096	April 21, 2023	Revitalizing Our Nation’s Commitment to Environmental Justice for All
Executive Order 14099	May 9, 2023	Moving Beyond COVID-19 Vaccination Requirements for Federal Workers
Executive Order 14110	October 30, 2023	Safe, Secure, and Trustworthy Development and Use of Artificial Intelligence
Executive Order 14115	February 1, 2024	Imposing Certain Sanctions on Persons Undermining Peace, Security, and Stability in the West Bank
Executive Order 14124	July 17, 2024	White House Initiative on Advancing Educational Equity, Excellence, and Economic Opportunity Through Hispanic-Serving Institutions
Executive Order 14134	January 3, 2025	Providing an Order of Succession Within the Department of Agriculture
Executive Order 14135	January 3, 2025	Providing an Order of Succession Within the Department of Homeland Security
Executive Order 14136	January 3, 2025	Providing an Order of Succession Within the Department of Justice
Executive Order 14137	January 3, 2025	Providing an Order of Succession Within the Department of the Treasury
Executive Order 14138	January 3, 2025	Providing an Order of Succession Within the Office of Management and Budget
Executive Order 14139	January 3, 2025	Providing an Order of Succession Within the Office of the National Cyber Director
Executive Order 14143	January 16, 2025	Providing for the Appointment of Alumni of AmeriCorps to the Competitive Service

== See also ==
- Executive order
- List of executive actions by Barack Obama
- List of executive actions by Joe Biden
- List of executive orders in the second presidency of Donald Trump
- List of bills in the 119th United States Congress
