= National Law Enforcement Accountability Database =

American government database

The National Law Enforcement Accountability Database (NLEAD) was a United States government database, maintained by the United States Department of Justice, which indexed official records of federal law enforcement officer misconduct, commendations, and awards. The database was accessible only to authorized users to help determine suitability and eligibility of candidates for law enforcement positions.

NEAD was established under Executive Order 14074 by President Joe Biden on May 25, 2022, the second anniversary of the murder of George Floyd. It was part of a package of police reforms Biden enacted by executive order after Congress failed to pass the George Floyd Justice in Policing Act. The order also required all federal law enforcement agencies to contribute to the database, and required the Department's Bureau of Justice Statistics (BJS) to release an annual report containing aggregated and anonymized data from the database to maintain transparency and accountability.

President Trump rescinded Executive Order 14074 on January 20, 2025, with Executive Order 14148, deactivating the NLEAD and the reports generated from it.
