= Executive Order 13988 =

Executive order issued by U.S. President Joe Biden on sex discrimination

- "Preventing and Combating Discrimination on the Basis of Gender Identity or Sexual Orientation"

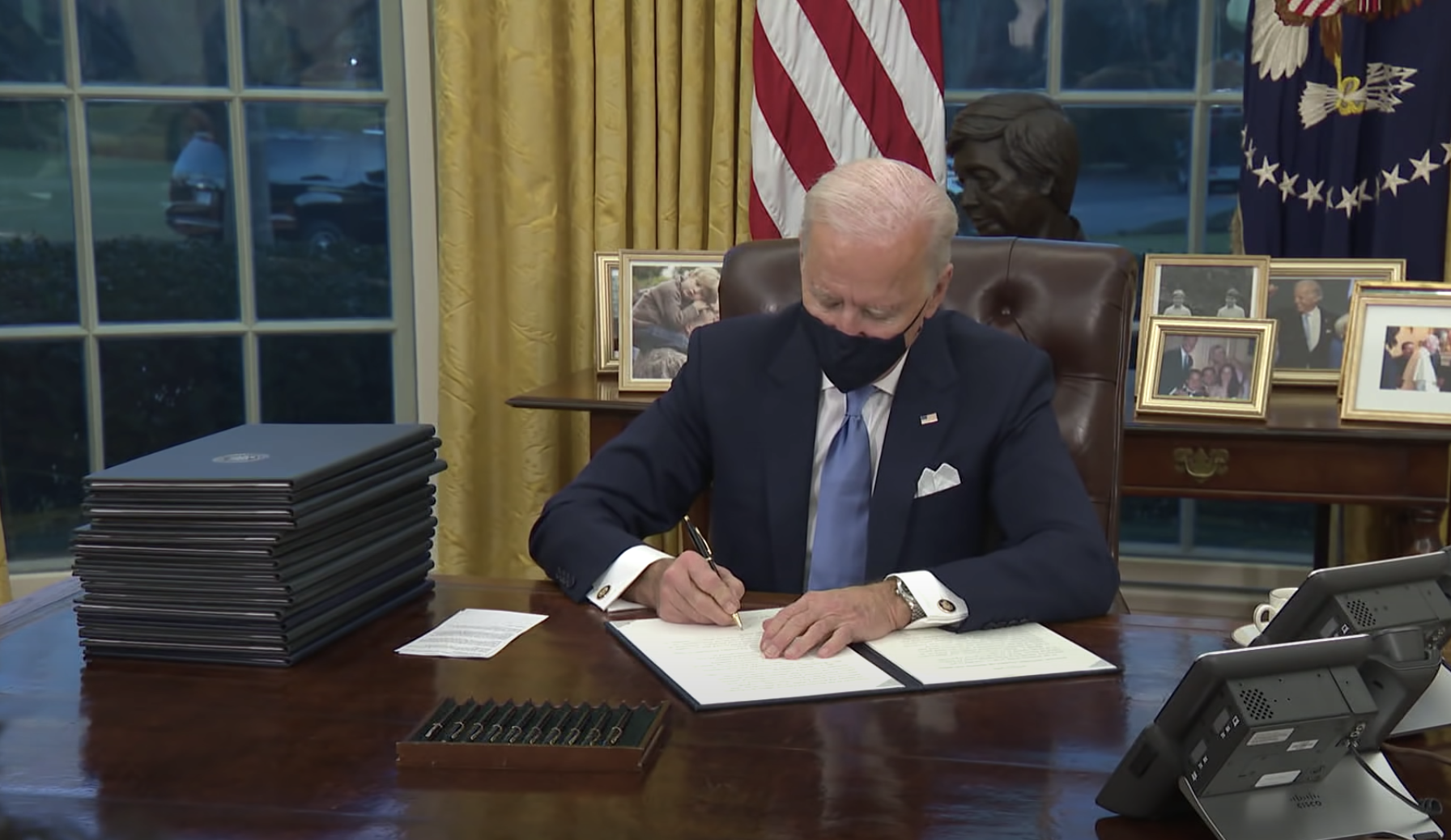
- President Biden signs a series of Executive Orders amongst which was order 13988 shortly after his inauguration on January 20, 2021.
- Type: Executive order
- Number: 13988
- President: Joe Biden
- Signed: January 20, 2021

Federal Register details
- Federal Register document number: 2021-01761
- Publication date: January 20, 2021

Summary
- Requires all federal agencies to extend existing protections on the basis of sex to include sexual orientation and gender identity

Executive Order 13988, officially titled Preventing and Combating Discrimination on the Basis of Gender Identity or Sexual Orientation, was the fourth executive order signed by U.S. President Joe Biden on January 20, 2021. It was rescinded by Donald Trump within hours of his assuming office on January 20, 2025.

== Provisions ==
The order directs all federal agencies to review all policies which implement the non-discrimination protections on the basis of sex ordered by Title VII of the Civil Rights Act of 1964 (pursuant to the Supreme Court case Bostock v. Clayton County), Title IX of the Education Amendments of 1972, the Fair Housing Act and section 412 of the Immigration and Nationality Act of 1965 and to extend these protections to the categories of sexual orientation and gender identity. This executive order extended beyond the scope of President Barack Obama's Executive Order 13672 of 2014 (which protected against discrimination on the basis of gender identity in the civilian federal workforce as well as sexual orientation and gender identity discrimination by federal contractors) as well as President Bill Clinton's Executive Order 13087 (which protected against discrimination on the basis of sexual orientation in the civilian federal workforce).

== Reactions ==
=== Support ===
The Human Rights Campaign hailed Biden's order as "most substantive, wide-ranging executive order concerning sexual orientation and gender identity ever issued by a United States president".

=== Opposition ===
In opposition, Republican Senator Roger Marshall stated the executive order "shows no common sense and will bring about the destruction of women's sports". Former Ambassador to the United Nations Nikki Haley denounced Biden's order, calling it "an attack on women's rights".

Lauren Adams, legal director for the Women's Liberation Front said "both executive orders send a heartbreaking message to women and girls that their government does not view them as worthy of consideration and is not willing to recognize female people as a discrete class."

Following the departure of President Biden from office and the inauguration of Donald Trump as the 47th president of the United States, the Trump administration immediately rescinded the order, labeling its provisions as "unpopular, inflationary, illegal, and radical practices".

== See also ==
- List of executive actions by Joe Biden
- LGBT rights in the United States
- Bostock v. Clayton County
- Equality Act, proposed legislation to formalize these and related changes into federal law
