= Ignite Institute =

Coordinates: 39°02′44.1″N 84°37′18.0″W

- 37 Atlantic Ave, Erlanger, Kentucky 41018; United States

Information
- Type: STEAM fields High school
- Motto: "Care first, then teach"
- Established: 2019
- School district: Boone County Schools
- Principal: Jerome Gels
- Grades: 9 through 12
- Tuition: Free
- Website: www.igniteinstitute.org

Ignite Institute is a STEAM fields high school located in Erlanger, Kentucky, and is the first STEAM-focused high school in Kentucky specializing in Science, Technology, Engineering, Arts and Mathematics. Specifically, it offers courses in Biomedical Sciences, Allied Health, Computer Science, Engineering, Design, and Education. The school is managed and operated by the Boone County School District, having partnerships with the Kenton County School District and Holmes High School in Covington, KY. Students grades 8th through 10th from any of those districts may apply.

== History ==
The school site was donated by Toyota as a parting gift to the community of Erlanger as they have now moved to Texas. Toyota's gift was one of their former laboratories, which they wanted to be transformed into a school that would specifically train students to enter fields where employees were needed in the Northern Kentucky area. Ignite agreed and established internal colleges relating to these fields such as Allied Health, Biomedical Sciences, Design, Education, Engineering, and Computer Science; all cornerstones of the NKY workforce.

== Education ==
The Ignite Institute teaches its students with experimental hands-on learning with the intention of training them to become valuable members of the workforce. Students at the Ignite Institute, similarly to High Tech High and Plano Academy, learn using project-based learning to receive STEAM based skills that correlate to local high paying employers such as CVG, Toyota, GE, etc. Another goal of the school is to "maintain and nurture the childlike wonder students experience entering kindergarten, which too often fizzles by seventh or eighth grade." Education at the Ignite Institute follows a strict motto: "Care first, then teach." The goal of the school using that foundation is to redefine modern education, and inspire educators around the world. Ignite aims to help students learn in an exciting way, "teaching them what they want to learn, and just as importantly, what they don't." Educators at the Institute called on local industrial leaders to help design a curriculum to address gaps in the workforce, and train modern students to interact with business leaders. The school often brings guests to the campus to interact with the students and train the students to have real world experiences. The school holds a yearly political forum for freshmen, in which students will have the opportunity to interact with politicians and gain real-world political knowledge. The Ignite Institute offers six different on-campus colleges, being Biomedical Sciences, Allied Health, Computer Science, Engineering, Education, and Design. Every student's schedule has at least one block per instructional day (Monday, Wednesday, Friday) dedicated to studies of their specific college. During production days (Tuesday, Thursday), students spend the day working on incomplete assignments, studying, and other various non-instructional tasks.

== Extracurricular activities ==
=== VEX Robotics ===
On May 7, 2022, Ignite's VEX Robotics team won the World Championships in Dallas, Texas. Out of 20,000 registered teams, only 818 from 40 countries were selected for the world competition. The Ignite robotics team went 10–0 in round-robin qualification matches. They then went on to win the quarterfinal and semifinal to get to the best-of-three division final. They lost the first match, but came back to win the second match and the third match to earn a spot in the grand elimination bracket of all 10 division winners. They again won their quarterfinal and semifinal matches taking them to the best of three finalists to crown the world champion.

== Notable alumni ==
- Hajar Elayyadi, first Kentuckian to graduate high school with a bachelor's degree
