= Executive Order 13991 =

Executive order signed by U.S. President Joe Biden

- Protecting the Federal Workforce and Requiring Mask-Wearing

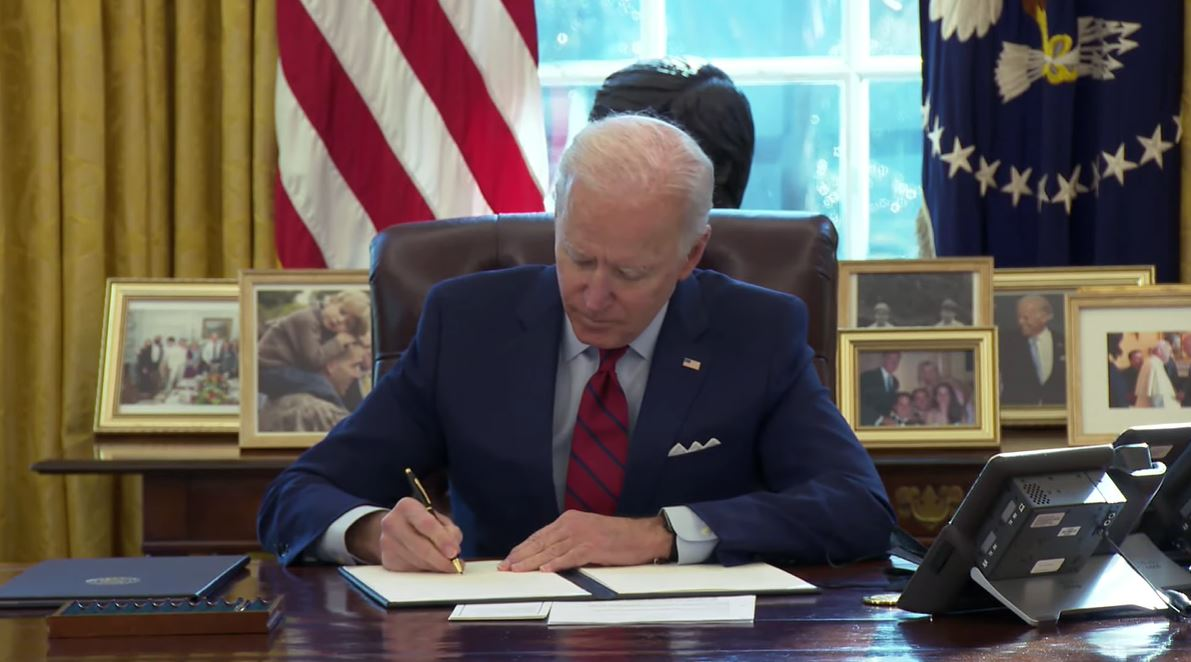
- President Biden signs a series of Executive Orders amongst which was order 13991 shortly after his inauguration on January 20th, 2021.
- Type: Executive order
- Number: 13991
- President: Joe Biden
- Signed: January 20, 2021

Federal Register details
- Federal Register document number: 2021-01766
- Publication date: January 20, 2021

Summary
- Requires mask wearing on all federal lands and in all federal buildings. Additionally requires social distancing be maintained in federal buildings.

Repealed by
- Executive Order 14122, "COVID-19 and Public Health Preparedness and Response", April 12, 2024

Executive Order 13991, officially titled Protecting the Federal Workforce and Requiring Mask-Wearing (and also referred to as the 100 Day Masking Challenge), is an executive order signed by U.S. President Joe Biden on January 20, 2021. The order commands federal agencies and properties to require that mitigations to help reduce the spread of Coronavirus disease 2019 (COVID-19), as recommended by the Centers for Disease Control and Prevention (CDC), be employed and enforced by the employees and visitors of federal land and properties, including social distancing and the wearing of face masks.

== Provisions ==
The order states that the heads of executive departments and agencies "shall immediately take action, as appropriate and consistent with applicable law, to require compliance with CDC guidelines with respect to wearing masks, maintaining physical distance, and other public health measures" by visitors and employees of federal land and properties, and commands the Secretary of Health and Human Services to "engage" with political leaders and community members to "[maximize] public compliance with, and addressing any obstacles to, mask-wearing and other public health best practices identified by [the] CDC." The order was revoked on April 12, 2024.

== See also ==
- List of executive actions by Joe Biden
