= Executive Order 13997 =

Executive order signed by U.S. President Joe Biden

- "Improving and Expanding Access to Care and Treatments for COVID-19"
- Type: Executive order
- Number: 13997
- President: Joe Biden
- Signed: January 21, 2021

Federal Register details
- Federal Register document number: 2021-01858
- Publication date: January 21, 2021

Summary
- Ameliorating and increasing access to COVID-19 care and treatment.

Executive Order 13997, officially titled Improving and Expanding Access to Care and Treatments for COVID-19, was signed on January 21, 2021, and was the thirteenth executive order signed by U.S. President Joe Biden. The order worked to ameliorate and increase access to COVID-19 care and treatment. It was rescinded by Donald Trump within hours of his assuming office on January 20, 2025.

== Provisions ==
In consultation with the Director of the National Institute of Health, this order directed the Secretary of Health and Human Services to draw up a plan to support new studies to identify the most promising treatments for COVID-19 as well as future threats to public health, to develop a plan to promote research in rural hospitals, and to study its impact on patients' health for the long term. This order also directed the Secretary of Defense, the Secretary of Health and Human Services (HHS), and the Secretary of Veterans Affairs to offer urgent support and to set forth objectives for production, assignment, and distribution of COVID-19 treatments in critical and long-term care institutions. In addition, the ordinance instructed the HHS secretary to provide advice on how to enhance the capability of their health care workers to states and medical providers. Lastly, the order stipulated that the Secretary of the HHS should assess obstacles to maximizing the effective and fair application of COVID-19 treatments in order to promote successful COVID-19 insurance coverage, including the assessment of Medicare, Medicaid, and health insurance plans.

== Effects ==
The order lead to new strategies for accelerating the development of COVID-19 treatments and improving access to high-quality, affordable healthcare by the HHS and the National Institutes of Health. Several federal departments and agencies delivered vital and long-term care services in a targeted way.

== See also ==
- List of executive actions by Joe Biden
- 2020 United States census
