= Executive Order 13995 =

Executive order signed by U.S. President Joe Biden

- "Ensuring an Equitable Pandemic Response and Recovery"
- Type: Executive order
- Number: 13995
- President: Joe Biden
- Signed: January 21, 2021

Federal Register details
- Federal Register document number: 2021-01852
- Publication date: January 21, 2021

Summary
- Guaranteeing a fair response and recovery from the COVID-19 pandemic.

Executive Order 13995, officially titled Ensuring an Equitable Pandemic Response and Recovery, was signed on January 21, 2021, and was the eleventh executive order signed by U.S. President Joe Biden. The order works to guarantee a fair response and recovery from the COVID-19 pandemic. It was rescinded by Donald Trump within hours of his assuming office on January 20, 2025.

== Provisions ==
This order created the COVID-19 Health Equity Task Force within the Department of Health and Human Services. The task force aimed at addressing the pandemic's disproportionate and severe impact on people of color and other under-served populations. The task group gave the President specific suggestions on how to reduce the health inequalities that COVID-19 causes or exacerbates, including how state and municipal officials allocate equitable resources and resources and communicate with communities with colors and underserved peoples. In addition, the task force worked with heads of key agencies to collect data to prepare long-term recommendations to remedy deficiencies.

== Effects ==
The order established a COVID-19 Health Equity Task Force within the United States Department of Health and Human Services. This was intended to benefit communities of color and underserved populations because the government will now be making a more concerted effort to ensure that all people have the same resources and are treated equally.

== See also ==
- List of executive actions by Joe Biden
- 2020 United States census
