= Executive Order 14070 =

Executive order signed by U.S. President Joe Biden

- "Continuing To Strengthen Americans' Access to Affordable, Quality Health Coverage"

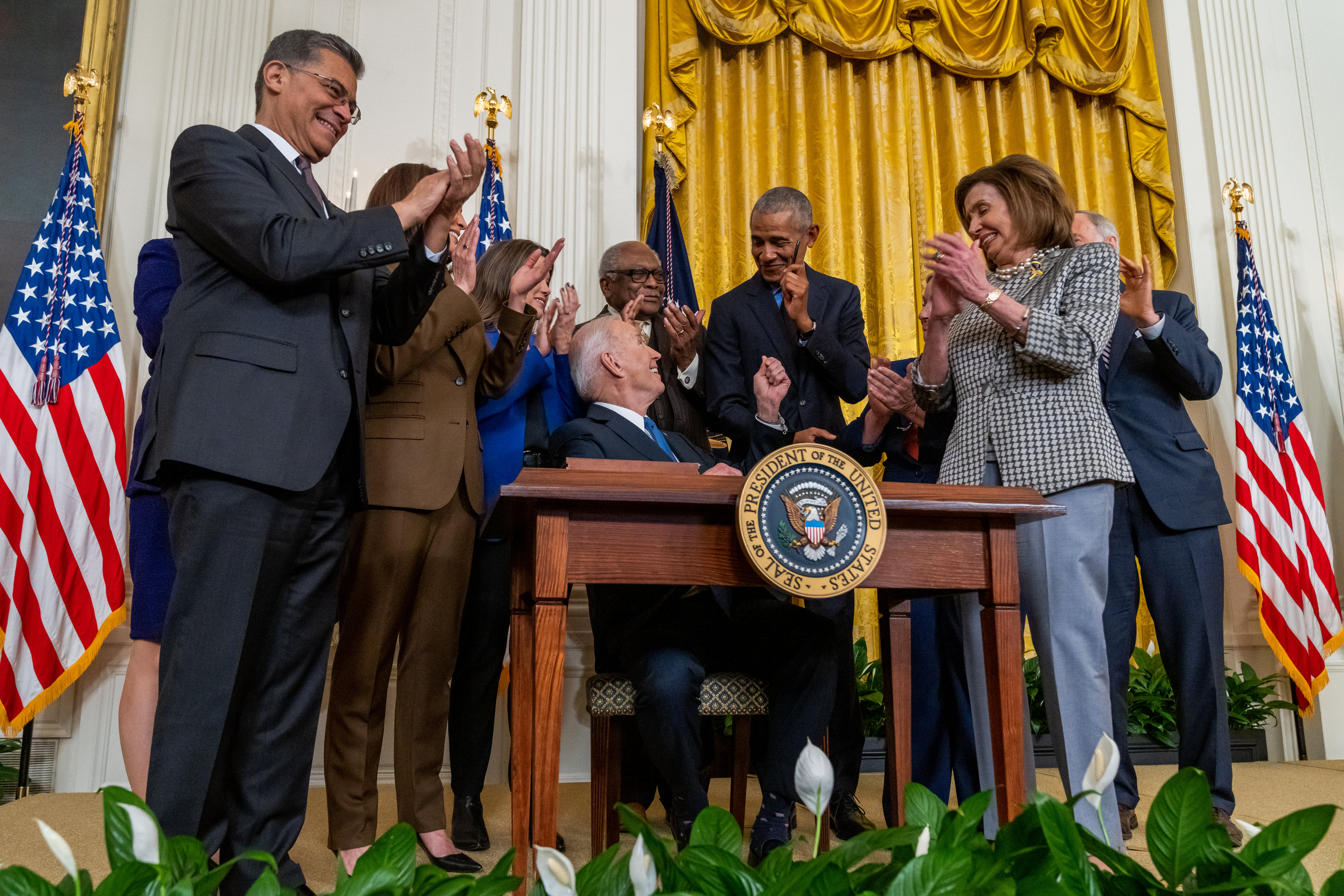
- President Joe Biden signs the executive order in the East Room of the White House on April 5, 2022
- Type: Executive order
- Number: 14070
- President: Joe Biden
- Signed: April 5, 2022

Federal Register details
- Federal Register document number: 2022-07716
- Publication date: April 5, 2022

Summary
- Working to ensure that every American citizen has access to affordable, high-quality health care.

Executive Order 14070, titled “Continuing To Strengthen Americans’ Access to Affordable, Quality Health Coverage,” was signed by U.S. President Joe Biden on April 5, 2022. This marked the 86th executive order signed by Biden.

The order's purpose was to protect and strengthen Medicaid and the Affordable Care Act (ACA), and to make high-quality health care accessible and affordable. Portions of Biden-era executive actions, including Executive Order 14070, were listed for revocation in the U.S. President Donald Trump administration’s rescission order on the January 20th, 2025.

== Provisions ==
The order described how the American Rescue Plan Act (ARP) affected coverage, for example, by increasing marketplace premium subsidies, creating an option to extend postpartum Medicaid coverage, and providing incentives for states that expand Medicaid. The administration referenced pending legislative proposals (including elements associated with the Build Back Better package) that would have expanded or extended some ARP provisions; the order also urged Congress to consider legislative action to maintain enhanced marketplace subsidies and other measures, address the Medicaid coverage gap, and consider permitting Medicare to negotiate certain prescription drug prices.

The executive order cites data indicating persistent coverage gaps, particularly in states that have not expanded Medicaid, and highlights issues such as underinsurance, medical debt, and mismatches between enrollment and consumer needs.

The executive order directs certain agencies to look into policies to:

- Improve clarity of coverage options and plan selection.
- Increase benefits and provider access.
- Strengthen protections for consumers.
- Improve availability and affordability of Medicaid, Medicare, and other public programs.
- Explore measures to reduce medical debt.

== See also ==
- List of executive actions by Joe Biden
