= Executive Order 13994 =

Executive order signed by U.S. President Joe Biden

- "Ensuring a Data-Driven Response to COVID-19 and Future High-Consequence Public Health Threats"
- Type: Executive order
- Number: 13994
- President: Joe Biden
- Signed: January 21, 2021

Federal Register details
- Federal Register document number: 2021-01849
- Publication date: January 21, 2021

Summary
- Ensuring a more analytical approach to dealing with COVID-19 public health threats.

Executive Order 13994, officially titled Ensuring a Data-Driven Response to COVID-19 and Future High-Consequence Public Health Threats, is the tenth executive order signed by U.S. President Joe Biden. The order indicates that it is vital to ensure that there is a more analytical approach to dealing with COVID-19 public health threats.

== Provisions ==
This order directs the Secretary of Defense, the Attorney General, the Secretary of Commerce, the Secretary of Labor, the Secretary of Health and Human Services, the Secretary of Education, the Director of the Office of Management and Budget, the Director of National Intelligence, the Director of the Office of Science and Technology Policy, and the Director of the National Science Foundation to select and designate a senior official to lead the fight against the agency's COVID-19 and data-related issues. This individual will collaborate with the COVID-19 Response Coordinator to make accessible data related to highly significant hazards to public health. The Director of the Office of Personnel Management and the Director of OMB should quickly assess the capabilities on the part of agencies to recruit IT, staff and staff, for data collection and analysis. The Secretary of HHS shall examine the efficacy and connectedness of public health data systems in order to identify high-level health concerns and to review the collection by state and local authorities of morbidity and mortality data and shall provide a report with recommendations.

== Effects ==
The order will lead to an increase of attention and resources to effectively deal with data-related problems. The new senior official will likely lead a group that will publish accurate COVID-19 data to the public. Overall, this order should help the United States disseminate factually correct information to the public and foster a stronger feeling of trust between the people and the government.

== See also ==
- List of executive actions by Joe Biden
- 2020 United States census
