= Executive Order 13996 =

Executive order signed by U.S. President Joe Biden

- "Establishing the COVID-19 Pandemic Testing Board and Ensuring a Sustainable Public Health Workforce for COVID-19 and Other Biological Threats"
- Type: Executive order
- Number: 13996
- President: Joe Biden
- Signed: January 21, 2021

Federal Register details
- Federal Register document number: 2021-01854
- Publication date: January 21, 2021

Summary
- Assemble the COVID-19 Pandemic Testing Board and guarantee a sustainable public health workforce to fight against the COVID-19 virus and other biological threats.

Executive Order 13996, officially titled Establishing the COVID-19 Pandemic Testing Board and Ensuring a Sustainable Public Health Workforce for COVID-19 and Other Biological Threats, was signed on January 21, 2021, and was the twelfth executive order signed by U.S. President Joe Biden. The order indicated that the United States should assemble the COVID-19 Pandemic Testing Board and guarantee a sustainable public health workforce to fight against the COVID-19 virus and other biological threats. The order was rescinded by Donald Trump within hours of his assuming office on January 20, 2025.

== Provisions ==
In this order, the COVID-19 Pandemic Testing Board was established and controlled by the Coordinator of the COVID-19 Response and Counselor to the President. The board included the Chairperson-designated representatives of a variety of management departments and institutions. Representatives from a variety of executive departments and agencies served on the Testing Board, as determined by the President. The Board implemented a unified government-wide testing approach including the establishment of national testing and public health workforce strategy, expanding supplies of tests, increasing laboratory testing capacity, improvement of public health workers, supporting test testing for schools and priority populations, and ensuring clarity. It included a national testing approach and public health workforce strategy. The HHS Secretary also provided state and local health agencies with technical support and training for employees of public health.

== Effects ==
The order lead to the establishment of the COVID-19 Pandemic Testing Board. The hope was that the COVID-19 Pandemic Testing Board will increase testing efforts and begin the process of increasing healthcare supplies through the use of the Defense Production Act.

== See also ==
- List of executive actions by Joe Biden
- 2020 United States census
