= Executive Order 14064 =

Executive order signed by U.S. President Joe Biden

- "Protecting Certain Property of Da Afghanistan Bank for the Benefit of the People of Afghanistan"
- Type: Executive order
- Number: 14064
- President: Joe Biden
- Signed: February 11, 2022

Federal Register details
- Federal Register document number: 2022-03346
- Publication date: February 11, 2022

Summary
- Using frozen Afghan assets as humanitarian assistance.

Executive Order 14064, officially titled Protecting Certain Property of Da Afghanistan Bank for the Benefit of the People of Afghanistan, was signed on February 11, 2022 and is the 80th executive order signed by U.S. President Joe Biden. The goal of the order is providing humanitarian assistance to the Afghan people by using frozen assets.

== Provisions ==
Due to the lack of a recognized Afghan government, billions of dollars in assets held by Afghanistan's national bank, Da Afghanistan Bank (DAB), have sat dormant in American financial institutions. As a result, these assets have been the subject of litigation, as victims of the September 11th attacks have attempted to take them in order to satisfy outstanding judgments against the Taliban. Because of this, the Biden administration has proposed a plan that would transfer around half of these assets to a third-party trust where they may be utilized for the benefit of Afghans, while keeping the rest in place until the dispute is concluded.

As part of Afghanistan's foreign exchange reserves, the central bank is thought to hold more than $9 billion in assets overseas. Countries keep foreign exchange reserves for a variety of reasons, including facilitating international commerce and protecting the value of their own currency. Financial institutions in the United States have more than $7 billion of the $9 billion in total assets. The majority are held at the Federal Reserve Bank of New York (FRBNY), a popular repository for foreign exchange reserves held by numerous countries.

The legal system in the United States permits terror victims to go after assets through procedures that are beyond the executive branch’s purview. The administration's proposal would protect roughly half of the Afghan assets in question from these attachment efforts, allowing them to be used for a variety of future public policy purposes. It also makes legal arguments in favor of the central bank keeping the remainder of the assets.

== See also ==
- List of executive actions by Joe Biden
