= Executive Order 14054 =

Executive order signed by U.S. President Joe Biden

- "Termination of Emergency With Respect to the Situation in Burundi"
- Type: Executive order
- Number: 14054
- President: Joe Biden
- Signed: November 18, 2021

Federal Register details
- Federal Register document number: 2021-25548
- Publication date: November 19, 2021

Summary
- Terminating the national emergency in Burundi.

Executive Order 14054, officially titled Termination of Emergency With Respect to the Situation in Burundi, was signed on November 18, 2021, and is the 70th executive order signed by U.S. President Joe Biden. The telos of the order is terminating the national emergency in Burundi.

== Provisions ==
The purpose of this order is to terminate the national emergency in Burundi. The United States is dedicated to using economic sanctions in conjunction with diplomacy and other statecraft instruments to achieve a clear and precise goal. Furthermore, the US may alter penalties if circumstances justify it, such as when relevant parties change their behavior.

== Effects ==
The Department of the Treasury's Office of Foreign Assets Control (OFAC) has lifted its economic sanctions against Burundi. These actions were done in view of the country's changing circumstances and good political developments, notably President Ndayishimiye's reforms since taking office. The Specially Designated Nationals and Blocked Persons List has been updated to include all those who were blocked solely because of the Burundi Sanctions Regulations. All property and interests in property that have been frozen solely because of the Burundi Sanctions Regulations have been unfrozen. The Burundi Sanctions Regulations will be removed from the Code of Federal Regulations by OFAC at a later date. While E.O. 13712 was in place, pending or future OFAC enforcement investigations or actions relating to suspected breaches of the Burundi Sanctions Regulations may still be carried out.

== See also ==
- List of executive actions by Joe Biden
- 2020 United States census
