= Executive Order 14071 =

Executive order signed by U.S. President Joe Biden

- "Prohibiting New Investment in and Certain Services to the Russian Federation in Response to Continued Russian Federation Aggression"
- Type: Executive order
- Number: 14071
- President: Joe Biden
- Signed: April 6, 2022

Federal Register details
- Federal Register document number: 2022-07757
- Publication date: April 6, 2022

Summary
- In light of the Russian Federation's unrelenting aggression, the United States is restricting investment and certain services to the Russian Federation.

Executive Order 14071, officially titled Prohibiting New Investment in and Certain Services to the Russian Federation in Response to Continued Russian Federation Aggression, was signed on April 6, 2022, and is the 87th executive order signed by U.S. President Joe Biden. The telos of the order is to restrict investment and certain services into the Russian Federation due to their unrelenting violence against Ukraine.

== Provisions ==
The order prohibits all new investment in Russia by Americans, regardless of where they are based. Although President Biden does not define the term "investment" in the order, the OFAC has construed it broadly in previous contexts to encompass any transaction involving a promise or transfer of monies or other assets, or a loan or other extension of credit to an enterprise. Loans, extensions of credit, assumptions or guarantees, overdrafts, currency swaps, purchases of debt securities, loan purchases, sales of financial assets subject to a repurchase agreement, renewals or refinancings in which funds or credits are transferred or extended to a borrower or recipient, issuance of standby letters of credit, and drawdowns on existing lines of credit are all examples of this.

The OFAC has previously viewed the delay of payments for goods and services as a credit extension. This measure broadens previous limitations on new investment in Russia's energy industry by prohibiting all new investment in Russia, regardless of sector. New investment is now prohibited in all Russian business sectors, according to a White House news release, in order to ensure that the exodus from Russia by the private sector will continue. Despite the fact that the Order only applies to "new" investments, parties having existing business in Russia should exercise vigilance to ensure that any activity connected to previous investments do not qualify as "new" investments for the purposes of the action.

== See also ==
- List of executive actions by Joe Biden
