= List of executive actions by Joe Biden =

The president of the United States may take any of several kinds of executive actions.

Executive orders are issued to help officers and agencies of the executive branch manage the operations within the federal government itself. Presidential memoranda are closely related, and have the force of law on the Executive Branch, but are generally considered less prestigious. Presidential memoranda do not have an established process for issuance, and unlike executive orders, they are not numbered. A presidential determination results in an official policy or position of the executive branch of the United States government. A presidential proclamation is a statement issued by a president on a matter of public policy, under specific authority granted to the president by Congress, typically on a matter of widespread interest. Administrative orders are signed documents such as notices, letters, and orders, that can be issued to conduct administrative operations of the federal government. A presidential notice or a presidential sequestration order can also be issued.

Listed below are executive orders numbered 13985–14146, presidential proclamations, presidential memoranda, national security memoranda, presidential determinations, presidential sequestration orders, and presidential notices signed by U.S. president Joe Biden (2021–2025). On January 20, 2025, newly reinaugurated president Donald Trump signed Executive Order 14148, titled "Initial Rescissions of Harmful Executive Orders and Actions", rescinding 67 of Biden's executive orders and 11 presidential memoranda.

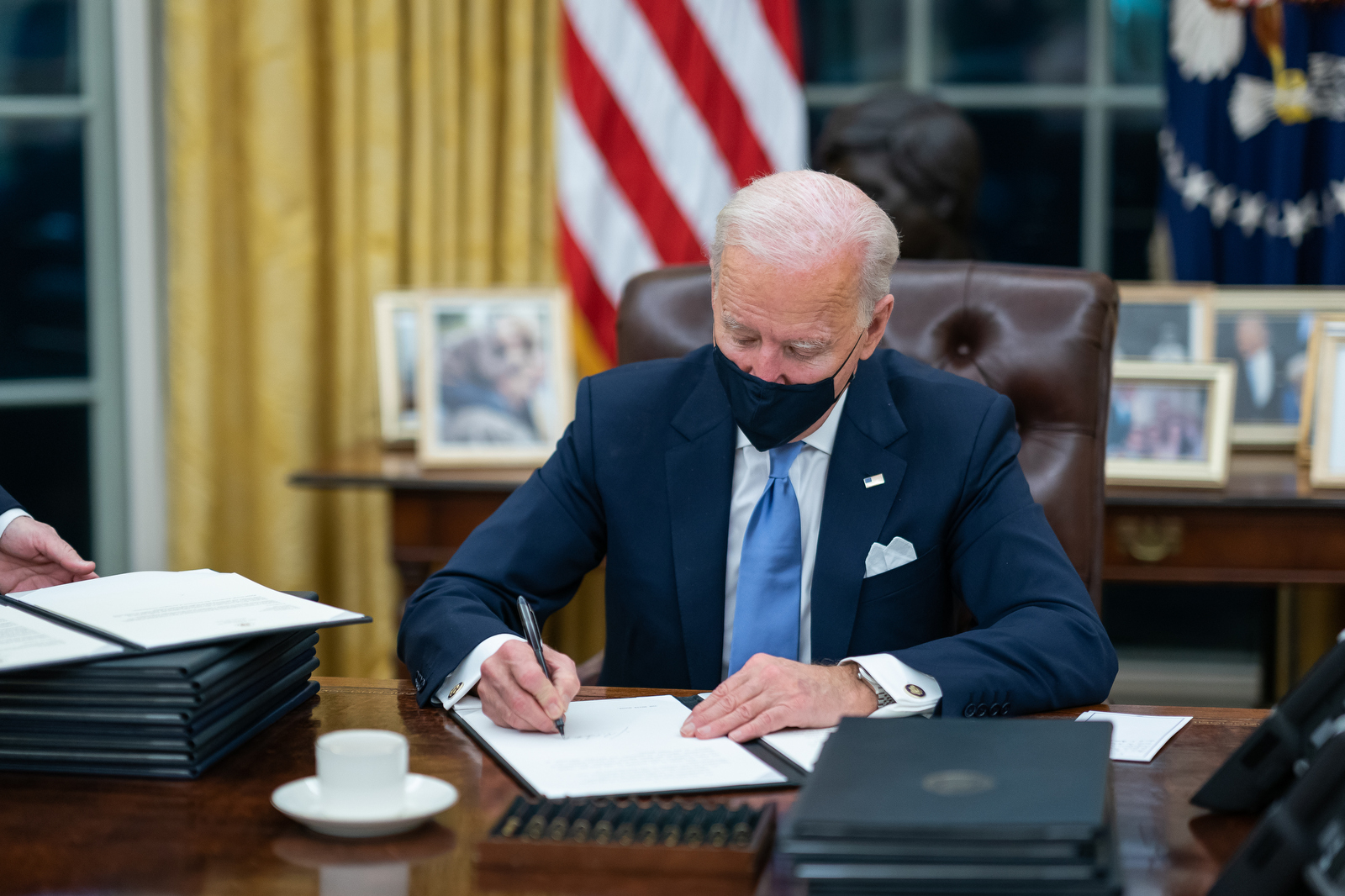
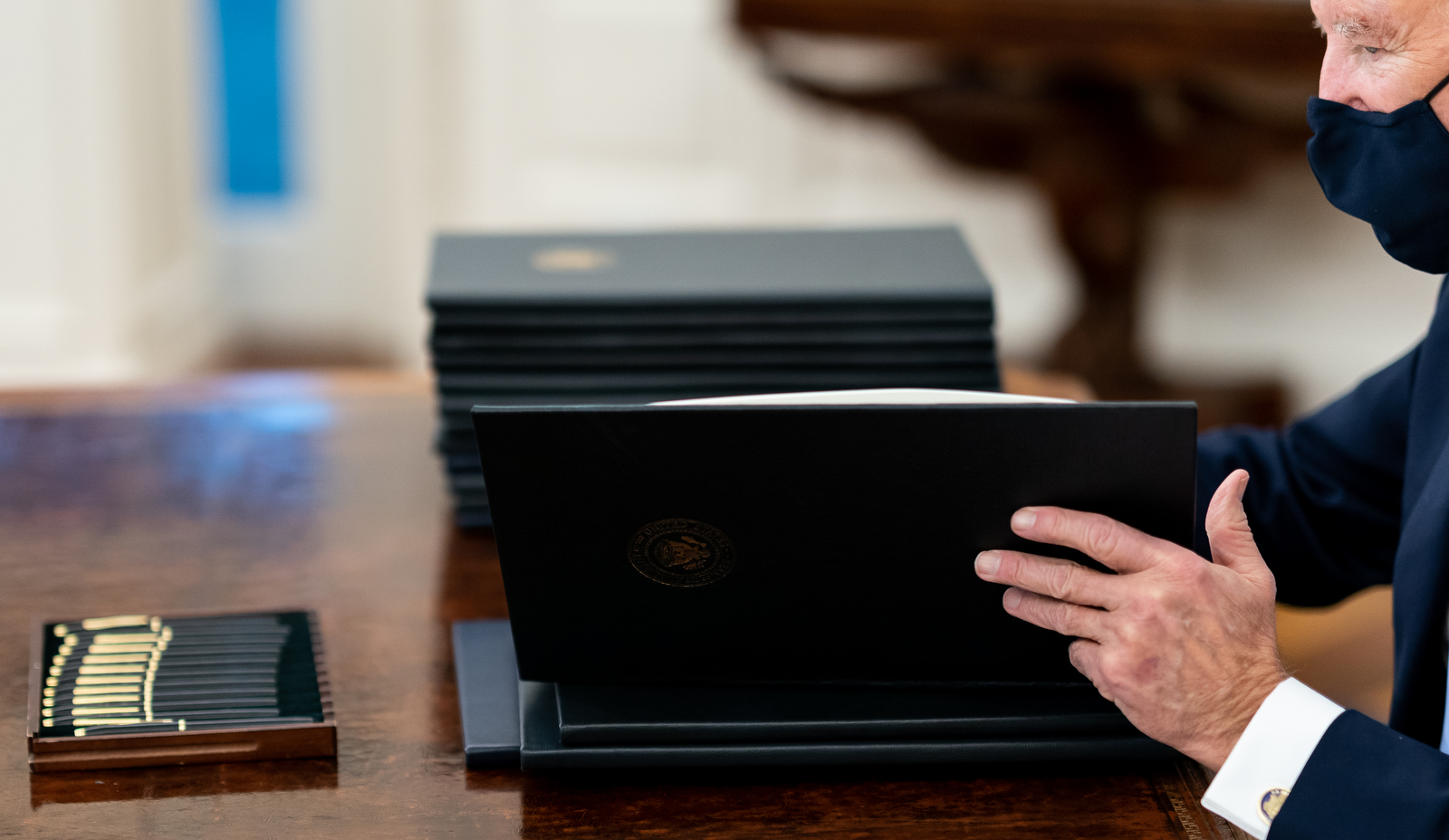
Joe Biden, on January 20, 2021, his first day as president, signing executive orders in the Oval Office

== Executive orders ==
President Biden signed a total of 162 executive orders during his singular term, from January 2021 to January 2025. As of January 22, 2025, 67 of them (41%) have been revoked by his successor, Donald Trump.

View source data.

=== 2021 ===
Relative no.	Series no.	Title / Description	Date signed	Date published	FR citation	FR doc. no.	Ref.	Revoked by – EO no.
1	13985	Advancing Racial Equity and Support for Underserved Communities Through the Federal Government	January 20, 2021	January 25, 2021	86 FR 7009	2021-01753		(14148)
2	13986	Ensuring a Lawful and Accurate Enumeration and Apportionment Pursuant to the Decennial Census	January 20, 2021	January 25, 2021	86 FR 7015	2021-01755		(14148)
3	13987	Organizing and Mobilizing the United States Government to Provide a Unified and Effective Response to Combat COVID-19 and to Provide United States Leadership on Global Health and Security	January 20, 2021	January 25, 2021	86 FR 7019	2021-01759		(14148)
4	13988	Preventing and Combating Discrimination on the Basis of Gender Identity or Sexual Orientation	January 20, 2021	January 25, 2021	86 FR 7023	2021-01761		(14148)
5	13989	Ethic Commitments by Executive Branch Personnel	January 20, 2021	January 25, 2021	86 FR 7029	2021-01762		(14148)
6	13990	Protecting Public Health and the Environment and Restoring Science to Tackle the Climate Crisis	January 20, 2021	January 25, 2021	86 FR 7037	2021-01765		(14148)
7	13991	Protecting the Federal Workforce and Requiring Mask-Wearing	January 20, 2021	January 25, 2021	86 FR 7045	2021-01766		
8	13992	Revocation of Certain Executive Orders Concerning Federal Regulation	January 20, 2021	January 25, 2021	86 FR 7049	2021-01767		(14148)
9	13993	Revision of Civil Immigration Enforcement Policies and Priorities	January 20, 2021	January 25, 2021	86 FR 7051	2021-01768		(14148)
10	13994	Ensuring a Data-Driven Response to COVID-19 and Future High-Consequence Public Health Threats	January 21, 2021	January 26, 2021	86 FR 7189	2021-01849		(14236)
11	13995	Ensuring an Equitable Pandemic Response and Recovery	January 21, 2021	January 26, 2021	86 FR 7193	2021-01852		(14148)
12	13996	Establishing the COVID-19 Pandemic Testing Board and Ensuring a Sustainable Public Health Workforce for COVID-19 and Other Biological Threats	January 21, 2021	January 26, 2021	86 FR 7197	2021-01854		(14148)
13	13997	Improving and Expanding Access to Care and Treatments for COVID-19	January 21, 2021	January 26, 2021	86 FR 7201	2021-01858		(14148)
14	13998	Promoting COVID-19 Safety in Domestic and International Travel	January 21, 2021	January 26, 2021	86 FR 7205	2021-01859		
15	13999	Protecting Worker Health and Safety	January 21, 2021	January 26, 2021	86 FR 7211	2021-01863		(14148)
16	14000	Supporting the Reopening and Continuing Operation of Schools and Early Childhood Education Providers	January 21, 2021	January 26, 2021	86 FR 7215	2021-01864		(14148)
17	14001	A Sustainable Public Health Supply Chain	January 21, 2021	January 26, 2021	86 FR 7219	2021-01865		
18	14002	Economic Relief Related to the COVID-19 Pandemic	January 22, 2021	January 27, 2021	86 FR 7229	2021-01923		(14148)
19	14003	Protecting the Federal Workforce	January 22, 2021	January 27, 2021	86 FR 7231	2021-01924		(14148)
20	14004	Enabling All Qualified Americans to Serve Their Country in Uniform	January 25, 2021	January 28, 2021	86 FR 7471	2021-02034		(14148)
21	14005	Ensuring the Future Is Made in All of America by All of America's Workers	January 25, 2021	January 28, 2021	86 FR 7475	2021-02034		
22	14006	Reforming Our Incarceration System to Eliminate the Use of Privately Operated Criminal Detention Facilities	January 26, 2021	January 29, 2021	86 FR 7483	2021-02070		(14148)
23	14007	President's Council of Advisors on Science and Technology	January 27, 2021	February 1, 2021	86 FR 7615	2021-02176		(14148)
24	14008	Tackling the Climate Crisis at Home and Abroad	January 27, 2021	February 1, 2021	86 FR 7619	2021-02177		(14148)
25	14009	Strengthening Medicaid and the Affordable Care Act	January 28, 2021	February 2, 2021	86 FR 7793	2021-02252		(14148)
26	14010	Creating a Comprehensive Regional Framework to Address the Causes of Migration, to Manage Migration Throughout North and Central America, and to Provide Safe and Orderly Processing of Asylum Seekers at the United States Border	February 2, 2021	February 5, 2021	86 FR 8267	2021-02561		(14148)
27	14011	Establishment of Interagency Task Force on the Reunification of Families	February 2, 2021	February 5, 2021	86 FR 8273	2021-02562		(14148)
28	14012	Restoring Faith in Our Legal Immigration Systems and Strengthening Integration and Inclusion Efforts for New Americans	February 2, 2021	February 5, 2021	86 FR 8277	2021-02563		(14148)
29	14013	Rebuilding and Enhancing Programs to Resettle Refugees and Planning for the Impact of Climate Change on Migration	February 4, 2021	February 9, 2021	86 FR 8839	2021-02804		(14148)
30	14014	Blocking Property with Respect to the Situation in Burma	February 11, 2021	February 12, 2021	86 FR 9429	2021-03139		
31	14015	Establishment of the White House Office of Faith-Based and Neighborhood Partnerships	February 14, 2021	February 18, 2021	86 FR 10007	2021-03424		(14148)
32	14016	Revocation of Executive Order 13801	February 17, 2021	February 23, 2021	86 FR 11089	2021-03874		
33	14017	America's Supply Chains	February 24, 2021	March 1, 2021	86 FR 11849	2021-04280		
34	14018	Revocation of Certain Presidential Actions	February 24, 2021	March 1, 2021	86 FR 11855	2021-04281		(14148)
35	14019	Promoting Access to Voting	March 7, 2021	March 10, 2021	86 FR 13623	2021-05087		(14148)
36	14020	Establishment of the White House Gender Policy Council	March 8, 2021	March 11, 2021	86 FR 13797	2021-05183		(14148)
37	14021	Guaranteeing an Educational Environment Free from Discrimination on the Basis of Sex, Including Sexual Orientation or Gender Identity	March 8, 2021	March 11, 2021	86 FR 13803	2021-05200		(14148)
38	14022	Termination of Emergency With Respect to the International Criminal Court	April 1, 2021	April 7, 2021	86 FR 17895	2021-07239		(14148)
39	14023	Establishment of the Presidential Commission on the Supreme Court of the United States	April 9, 2021	April 14, 2021	86 FR 19569	2021-07756		(14148)
40	14024	Blocking Property with Respect to Specified Harmful Foreign Activities of the Government of the Russian Federation	April 15, 2021	April 19, 2021	86 FR 20249	2021-08098		
41	14025	Worker Organizing and Empowerment	April 26, 2021	April 29, 2021	86 FR 22829	2021-09213		
42	14026	Increasing the Minimum Wage for Federal Contractors	April 27, 2021	April 30, 2021	86 FR 22835	2021-09263		(14236)
43	14027	Establishment of Climate Change Support Office	May 7, 2021	May 12, 2021	86 FR 25947	2021-10139		(14148)
44	14028	Improving the Nation's Cybersecurity	May 12, 2021	May 17, 2021	86 FR 26633	2021-10460		
45	14029	Revocation of Certain Presidential Actions and Technical Amendment	May 14, 2021	May 19, 2021	86 FR 27025	2021-10691		(14148)
46	14030	Climate-Related Financial Risk	May 20, 2021	May 25, 2021	86 FR 27967	2021-11168		(14148)
47	14031	Advancing Equity, Justice, and Opportunity for Asian Americans, Native Hawaiians, and Pacific Islanders	May 28, 2021	June 3, 2021	86 FR 29675	2021-11792		(14148)
48	14032	Addressing the Threat From Securities Investments That Finance Certain Companies of the People's Republic of China	June 3, 2021	June 7, 2021	86 FR 30145	2021-10607		
49	14033	Blocking Property and Suspending Entry Into the United States of Certain Persons Contributing to the Destabilizing Situation in the Western Balkans	June 8, 2021	June 10, 2021	86 FR 31079	2021-12382		
50	14034	Protecting Americans' Sensitive Data From Foreign Adversaries	June 9, 2021	June 11, 2021	86 FR 31423	2021-12506		
51	14035	Diversity, Equity, Inclusion, and Accessibility in the Federal Workforce	June 25, 2021	June 30, 2021	86 FR 34593	2021-14127		(14148)
52	14036	Promoting Competition in the American Economy	July 9, 2021	July 14, 2021	86 FR 36987	2021-15069		
53	14037	Strengthening American Leadership in Clean Cars and Trucks	August 5, 2021	August 10, 2021	86 FR 43583	2021-17121		(14148)
54	14038	Blocking Property of Additional Persons Contributing to the Situation in Belarus	August 9, 2021	August 11, 2021	86 FR 43905	2021-17253		
55	14039	Blocking Property with Respect to Certain Russian Energy Export Pipelines	August 20, 2021	August 24, 2021	86 FR 47205	2021-18306		
56	14040	Declassification Reviews of Certain Documents Concerning the Terrorist Attacks of September 11, 2001	September 3, 2021	September 9, 2021	86 FR 50439	2021-19578		
57	14041	White House Initiative on Advancing Educational Equity, Excellence, and Economic Opportunity Through Historically Black Colleges and Universities	September 3, 2021	September 9, 2021	86 FR 50443	2021-19579		
58	14042	Ensuring Adequate COVID Safety Protocols for Federal Contractors	September 9, 2021	September 14, 2021	86 FR 50985	2021-19924		
59	14043	Requiring Coronavirus Disease 2019 Vaccination for Federal Employees	September 9, 2021	September 14, 2021	86 FR 50989	2021-19927		
60	14044	Amending Executive Order 14007	September 13, 2021	September 16, 2021	86 FR 51579	2021-20164		(14148)
61	14045	White House Initiative on Advancing Educational Equity, Excellence, and Economic Opportunity for Hispanics	September 13, 2021	September 16, 2021	86 FR 51581	2021-20165		(14148)
62	14046	Imposing Sanctions on Certain Persons With Respect to the Humanitarian and Human Rights Crisis in Ethiopia	September 17, 2021	September 21, 2021	86 FR 52389	2021-20508		
63	14047	Adding Measles to the List of Quarantinable Communicable Diseases	September 17, 2021	September 22, 2021	86 FR 52591	2021-20629		
64	14048	Continuance or Reestablishment of Certain Federal Advisory Committees and Amendments to Other Executive Orders	September 30, 2021	October 5, 2021	86 FR 55465	2021-21908		
65	14049	White House Initiative on Advancing Educational Equity, Excellence, and Economic Opportunity for Native Americans and Strengthening Tribal Colleges and Universities	October 11, 2021	October 14, 2021	86 FR 57313	2021-22588		(14148)
66	14050	White House Initiative on Advancing Educational Equity, Excellence, and Economic Opportunity for Black Americans	October 19, 2021	October 22, 2021	86 FR 58551	2021-23224		(14148)
67	14051	Designation To Exercise Authority Over the National Defense Stockpile	October 31, 2021	November 3, 2021	86 FR 60747	2021-24183		
68	14052	Implementation of the Infrastructure Investment and Jobs Act	November 15, 2021	November 18, 2021	86 FR 64335	2021-25286		(14148)
69	14053	Improving Public Safety and Criminal Justice for Native Americans and Addressing the Crisis of Missing or Murdered Indigenous People	November 15, 2021	November 18, 2021	86 FR 64337	2021-25287		
70	14054	Termination of Emergency With Respect to the Situation in Burundi	November 18, 2021	November 19, 2021	86 FR 66149	2021-25548		
71	14055	Nondisplacement of Qualified Workers Under Service Contracts	November 18, 2021	November 23, 2021	86 FR 66397	2021-25715		(14148)
72	14056	The National Space Council	December 1, 2021	December 3, 2021	86 FR 68871	2021-26459		
73	14057	Catalyzing Clean Energy Industries and Jobs Through Federal Sustainability	December 8, 2021	December 13, 2021	86 FR 70935	2021-27114		(14148)
74	14058	Transforming Federal Customer Experience and Service Delivery To Rebuild Trust in Government	December 13, 2021	December 16, 2021	86 FR 71357	2021-27380		
75	14059	Imposing Sanctions on Foreign Persons Involved in the Global Illicit Drug Trade	December 15, 2021	December 17, 2021	86 FR 71549	2021-27505		
76	14060	Establishing the United States Council on Transnational Organized Crime	December 15, 2021	December 20, 2021	86 FR 71793	2021-27605		(14148)
77	14061	Adjustments of Certain Rates of Pay	December 22, 2021	December 28, 2021	86 FR 73601	2021-28313		

=== 2022 ===
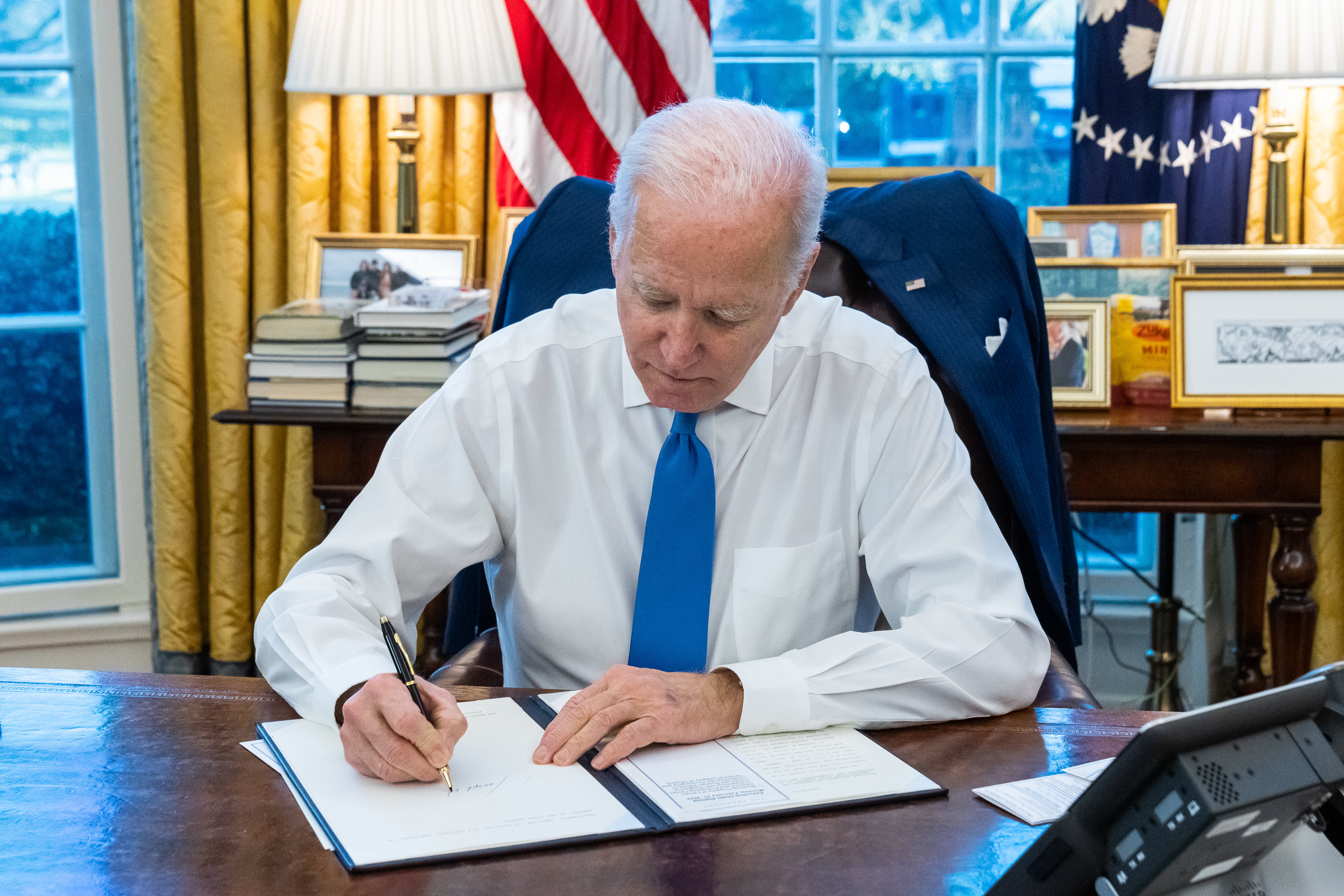
United States President Joe Biden signing Executive Order 14065 in February 2022 in response to Russia's imminent invasion of Ukraine. This was followed in April 2022 by Executive Order 14071, titled "Prohibiting New Investment in and Certain Services to the Russian Federation in Response to Continued Russian Federation Aggression"

Relative no.	Series no.	Title / Description	Date signed	Date published	FR citation	FR doc. no.	Ref.	Revoked by – EO no.
78	14062	2022 Amendments to the Manual for Courts-Martial, United States	January 26, 2022	January 31, 2022	87 FR 4763	2022-02027		
79	14063	Use of Project Labor Agreements for Federal Construction Projects	February 4, 2022	February 9, 2022	87 FR 7363	2022-02869		
80	14064	Protecting Certain Property of Da Afghanistan Bank for the Benefit of the People of Afghanistan	February 11, 2022	February 15, 2022	87 FR 8391	2022-03346		
81	14065	Blocking Property of Certain Persons and Prohibiting Certain Transactions With Respect to Continued Russian Efforts To Undermine the Sovereignty and Territorial Integrity of Ukraine	February 21, 2022	February 23, 2022	87 FR 10293	2022-04020		
82	14066	Prohibiting Certain Imports and New Investments With Respect to Continued Russian Federation Efforts To Undermine the Sovereignty and Territorial Integrity of Ukraine	March 8, 2022	March 10, 2022	87 FR 13625	2022-05232		
83	14067	Ensuring Responsible Development of Digital Assets	March 9, 2022	March 14, 2022	87 FR 14143	2022-05471		
84	14068	Prohibiting Certain Imports, Exports, and New Investment With Respect to Continued Russian Federation Aggression	March 11, 2022	March 15, 2022	87 FR 14381	2022-05554		
85	14069	Advancing Economy, Efficiency, and Effectiveness in Federal Contracting by Promoting Pay Equity and Transparency	March 15, 2022	March 18, 2022	87 FR 15315	2022-05949		(14148)
86	14070	Continuing To Strengthen Americans' Access to Affordable, Quality Health Coverage	April 5, 2022	April 8, 2022	87 FR 20689	2022-07716		(14148)
87	14071	Prohibiting New Investment in and Certain Services to the Russian Federation in Response to Continued Russian Federation Aggression	April 6, 2022	April 8, 2022	87 FR 20999	2022-07757		
88	14072	Strengthening the Nation's Forests, Communities, and Local Economies	April 22, 2022	April 27, 2022	87 FR 24851	2022-09138		(14154)
89	14073	Enhancing the National Quantum Initiative Advisory Committee	May 4, 2022	May 9, 2022	87 FR 27909	2022-10076		
90	14074	Advancing Effective, Accountable Policing and Criminal Justice Practices to Enhance Public Trust and Public Safety	May 25, 2022	May 31, 2022	87 FR 32945	2022-11810		(14148)
91	14075	Advancing Equality for Lesbian, Gay, Bisexual, Transgender, Queer, and Intersex Individuals	June 15, 2022	June 21, 2022	87 FR 37189	2022-13391		(14148)
92	14076	Protecting Access to Reproductive Healthcare Services	July 8, 2022	July 13, 2022	87 FR 42053	2022-15138		
93	14077	Establishing an Emergency Board To Investigate Disputes Between Certain Railroads Represented by the National Carriers' Conference Committee of the National Railway Labor Conference and Their Employees Represented by Certain Labor Organizations	July 15, 2022	July 20, 2022	87 FR 43203	2022-15628		
94	14078	Bolstering Efforts To Bring Hostages and Wrongfully Detained United States Nationals Home	July 19, 2022	July 21, 2022	87 FR 43389	2022-15743		
95	14079	Securing Access to Reproductive and Other Healthcare Services	August 3, 2022	August 11, 2022	87 FR 49505	2022-17420		
96	14080	Implementation of the CHIPS Act of 2022	August 25, 2022	August 30, 2022	87 FR 52847	2022-18840		
97	14081	Advancing Biotechnology and Biomanufacturing Innovation for a Sustainable, Safe, and Secure American Bioeconomy	September 12, 2022	September 15, 2022	87 FR 56849	2022-20167		(14236)
98	14082	Implementation of the Energy and Infrastructure Provisions of the Inflation Reduction Act of 2022	September 12, 2022	September 16, 2022	87 FR 56861	2022-20210		(14148)
99	14083	Ensuring Robust Consideration of Evolving National Security Risks by the Committee on Foreign Investment in the United States	September 15, 2022	September 20, 2022	87 FR 57369	2022-20450		
100	14084	Promoting the Arts, the Humanities, and Museum and Library Services	September 30, 2022	October 5, 2022	87 FR 60535	2022-21839		(14148)
101	14085	Expanding Eligibility for Certain Military Decorations and Awards	October 3, 2022	October 6, 2022	87 FR 60541	2022-21911		
102	14086	Enhancing Safeguards for United States Signals Intelligence Activities	October 7, 2022	October 14, 2022	87 FR 62283	2022-22531		
103	14087	Lowering Prescription Drug Costs for Americans	October 14, 2022	October 19, 2022	87 FR 63399	2022-22834		(14148)
104	14088	Taking Additional Steps To Address the National Emergency With Respect to the Situation in Nicaragua	October 24, 2022	October 26, 2022	87 FR 64685	2022-23433		
105	14089	Establishing the President's Advisory Council on African Diaspora Engagement in the United States	December 13, 2022	December 19, 2022	87 FR 77459	2022-27585		(14148)
106	14090	Adjustments of Certain Rates of Pay	December 23, 2022	December 29, 2022	87 FR 79985	2022-28474		

=== 2023 ===
Relative no.	Series no.	Title / Description	Date signed	Date published	FR citation	FR doc. no.	Ref.	Revoked by – EO no.
107	14091	Further Advancing Racial Equity and Support for Underserved Communities Through the Federal Government	February 16, 2023	February 22, 2023	88 FR 10825	2023-03779		(14148)
108	14092	Reducing Gun Violence and Making Our Communities Safer	March 14, 2023	March 17, 2023	88 FR 16527	2023-05714		
109	14093	Prohibition on Use by the United States Government of Commercial Spyware That Poses Risks to National Security	March 27, 2023	March 30, 2023	88 FR 18957	2023-06730		
110	14094	Modernizing Regulatory Review	April 6, 2023	April 11, 2023	88 FR 21879	2023-07760		(14148)
111	14095	Increasing Access to High-Quality Care and Supporting Caregivers	April 18, 2023	April 21, 2023	88 FR 24669	2023-08659		
112	14096	Revitalizing Our Nation's Commitment to Environmental Justice for All	April 21, 2023	April 26, 2023	88 FR 25251	2023-08955		(14148)
113	14097	Authority To Order the Ready Reserve of the Armed Forces to Active Duty To Address International Drug Trafficking	April 27, 2023	May 1, 2023	88 FR 26471	2023-09318		
114	14098	Imposing Sanctions on Certain Persons Destabilizing Sudan and Undermining the Goal of a Democratic Transition	May 4, 2023	May 5, 2023	88 FR 29529	2023-09826		
115	14099	Moving Beyond COVID-19 Vaccination Requirements for Federal Workers	May 9, 2023	May 15, 2023	88 FR 30891	2023-10407		(14148)
116	14100	Advancing Economic Security for Military and Veteran Spouses, Military Caregivers, and Survivors	June 9, 2023	June 15, 2023	88 FR 39111	2023-12974		
117	14101	Strengthening Access to Affordable, High-Quality Contraception and Family Planning Services	June 23, 2023	June 28, 2023	88 FR 41815	2023-13889		
118	14102	Ordering the Selected Reserve and Certain Members of the Individual Ready Reserve of the Armed Forces to Active Duty	July 13, 2023	July 18, 2023	88 FR 4580	2023-15347		
119	14103	2023 Amendments to the Manual for Courts-Martial, United States	July 28, 2023	August 2, 2023	88 FR 50535	2023-16570		
120	14104	Federal Research and Development in Support of Domestic Manufacturing and United States Jobs	July 28, 2023	August 2, 2023	88 FR 51203	2023-16636		
121	14105	Addressing United States Investments in Certain National Security Technologies and Products in Countries of Concern	August 9, 2023	August 11, 2023	88 FR 54867	2023-17449		
122	14106	United States Coast Guard Officer Personnel Management	August 14, 2023	August 17, 2023	88 FR 55905	2023-17832		
123	14107	Exemption of Paul H. Maurer From Mandatory Separation	September 6, 2023	September 12, 2023	88 FR 62441	2023-19798		
124	14108	Ensuring the People of East Palestine Are Protected Now and in the Future	September 20, 2023	September 26, 2023	88 FR 66265	2023-21174		
125	14109	Continuance of Certain Federal Advisory Committees and Amendments to Other Executive Orders	September 29, 2023	October 4, 2023	88 FR 68447	2023-22250		
126	14110	Safe, Secure, and Trustworthy Development and Use of Artificial Intelligence	October 30, 2023	November 1, 2023	88 FR 75191	2023-24283		(14148)
127	14111	Interagency Security Committee	November 27, 2023	December 1, 2023	88 FR 83809	2023-26569		
128	14112	Reforming Federal Funding and Support for Tribal Nations To Better Embrace Our Trust Responsibilities and Promote the Next Era of Tribal Self-Determination	December 6, 2023	December 11, 2023	88 FR 86021	2023-27318		(14236)
129	14113	Adjustments of Certain Rates of Pay	December 21, 2023	December 26, 2023	88 FR 89259	2023-28661		
130	14114	Taking Additional Steps With Respect to the Russian Federation's Harmful Activities	December 22, 2023	December 26, 2023	88 FR 89271	2023-28662		

=== 2024 ===
Relative no.	Series no.	Title / Description	Date signed	Date published	FR citation	FR doc. no.	Ref.	Revoked by – EO no.
131	14115	Imposing Certain Sanctions on Persons Undermining Peace, Security, and Stability in the West Bank	February 1, 2024	February 5, 2024	89 FR 7605	2024-02354		(14148)
132	14116	Amending Regulations Relating to the Safeguarding of Vessels, Harbors, Ports, and Waterfront Facilities of the United States	February 21, 2024	February 26, 2024	89 FR 13971	2024-04012		
133	14117	Preventing Access to Americans' Bulk Sensitive Personal Data and United States Government-Related Data by Countries of Concern	February 28, 2024	March 1, 2024	89 FR 15421	2024-04573		
134	14118	Termination of Emergency With Respect to the Situation in Zimbabwe	March 4, 2024	March 5, 2024	89 FR 15945	2024-04857		
135	14119	Scaling and Expanding the Use of Registered Apprenticeships in Industries and the Federal Government and Promoting Labor-Management Forums	March 6, 2024	March 11, 2024	89 FR 17265	2024-05220		(14236)
136	14120	Advancing Women's Health Research and Innovation	March 18, 2024	March 21, 2024	89 FR 20095	2024-06123		
137	14121	Recognizing and Honoring Women's History	March 27, 2024	April 1, 2024	89 FR 22327	2024-06931		
138	14122	COVID-19 and Public Health Preparedness and Response	April 12, 2024	April 17, 2024	89 FR 27355	2024-08332		
139	14123	White House Council on Supply Chain Resilience	June 14, 2024	June 21, 2024	89 FR 51949	2024-13810		
140	14124	White House Initiative on Advancing Educational Equity, Excellence, and Economic Opportunity Through Hispanic-Serving Institutions	July 17, 2024	July 22, 2024	89 FR 59585	2024-16225		(14148)
141	14125	Establishing an Emergency Board To Investigate a Dispute Between New Jersey Transit Rail Operations and Its Locomotive Engineers Represented by the Brotherhood of Locomotive Engineers and Trainmen	July 24, 2024	July 29, 2024	89 FR 60791	2024-16740		
142	14126	Investing in America and Investing in American Workers	September 6, 2024	September 11, 2024	89 FR 73559	2024-20712		(14236)
143	14127	Combating Emerging Firearms Threats and Improving School-Based Active-Shooter Drills	September 26, 2024	October 2, 2024	89 FR 80345	2024-22938		
144	14128	Establishing a Second Emergency Board To Investigate a Dispute Between New Jersey Transit Rail Operations and Its Locomotive Engineers Represented by the Brotherhood of Locomotive Engineers and Trainmen	November 21, 2024	November 26, 2024	89 FR 93145	2024-27850		
145	14129	Providing for the Closing of Executive Departments and Agencies of the Federal Government on December 24, 2024	December 18, 2024	December 26, 2024	89 FR 104857	2024-31143		
146	14130	2024 Amendments to the Manual for Courts Martial, United States	December 20, 2024	December 27, 2024	89 FR 105343	2024-31354		
147	14131	Amendments to Executive Orders Relating to Certain Certificates and Badges	December 20, 2024	December 27, 2024	89 FR 105377	2024-31355		
148	14132	Adjustments of Certain Rates of Pay	December 23, 2024	December 30, 2024	89 FR 106963	2024-31466		
149	14133	Providing for the Closing of Executive Departments and Agencies of the Federal Government on January 9, 2025	December 30, 2024	January 3, 2025	90 FR 187	2024-31766		

=== 2025 ===
Relative no.	Series no.	Title / Description	Date signed	Date published	FR citation	FR doc. no.	Ref.	Revoked by – EO no.
150	14134	Providing an Order of Succession Within the Department of Agriculture	January 3, 2025	January 13, 2025	90 FR 2577	2025-00595		(14148)
151	14135	Providing an Order of Succession Within the Department of Homeland Security	January 3, 2025	January 13, 2025	90 FR 2579	2025-00603		(14148)
152	14136	Providing an Order of Succession Within the Department of Justice	January 3, 2025	January 13, 2025	90 FR 2581	2025-00611		(14148)
153	14137	Providing an Order of Succession Within the Department of the Treasury	January 3, 2025	January 13, 2025	90 FR 2583	2025-00618		(14148)
154	14138	Providing an Order of Succession Within the Office of Management and Budget	January 3, 2025	January 13, 2025	90 FR 2585	2025-00619		(14148)
155	14139	Providing an Order of Succession Within the Office of the National Cyber Director	January 3, 2025	January 13, 2025	90 FR 2587	2025-00620		(14148)
156	14140	Taking Additional Steps With Respect to the Situation in the Western Balkans	January 8, 2025	January 13, 2025	90 FR 2589	2025-00622		
157	14141	Advancing United States Leadership in Artificial Intelligence Infrastructure	January 14, 2025	January 17, 2025	90 FR 5469	2025-01395		
158	14142	Taking Additional Steps With Respect to the Situation in Syria	January 15, 2025	January 17, 2025	90 FR 6709	2025-01437		
159	14143	Providing for the Appointment of Alumni of AmeriCorps to the Competitive Service	January 16, 2025	January 17, 2025	90 FR 6751	2025-01467		(14148)
160	14144	Strengthening and Promoting Innovation in the Nation's Cybersecurity	January 16, 2025	January 17, 2025	90 FR 6755	2025-01470		
161	14145	Helping Left-Behind Communities Make a Comeback	January 19, 2025	January 24, 2025	90 FR 8105	2025-01758		
162	14146	Partial Revocation of Executive Order 13961	January 19, 2025	January 24, 2025	90 FR 8109	2025-01759		

== Presidential proclamations ==
View source data.
Cumulative number of proclamations signed by Joe Biden

== Presidential memoranda ==
President Biden signed a total of 99 presidential memoranda during his singular term, from January 2021 to January 2025. As of January 22, 2025, 11 of them have been revoked by his successor, Donald Trump.

=== 2021 ===
Relative no.	Title / Description	Addressed to	Date signed	Date published	FR citation	FR doc. no.	Ref.
1	Preserving and Fortifying Deferred Action for Childhood Arrivals (DACA)	Attorney General; Secretary of Homeland Security	January 20, 2021	January 25, 2021	86 FR 7053	2021-01769	
2	Reinstating Deferred Enforced Departure for Liberians	Secretary of State; Secretary of Homeland Security	January 20, 2021	January 25, 2021	86 FR 7055	2021-01770	
3	Modernizing Regulatory Review	Heads of Executive Departments and Agencies	January 20, 2021	January 26, 2021	86 FR 7223	2021-01866	
4	Memorandum To Extend Federal Support to Governors' Use of the National Guard To Respond to COVID-19 and To Increase Reimbursement and Other Assistance Provided to States	Secretary of Defense; Secretary of Homeland Security	January 21, 2021	January 28, 2021	86 FR 7481	2021-02043	
5	Condemning and Combating Racism, Xenophobia, and Intolerance Against Asian Americans and Pacific Islanders in the United States	Heads of Executive Departments and Agencies	January 26, 2021	January 29, 2021	86 FR 7485	2021-02073	
6	Redressing Our Nation's and the Federal Government's History of Discriminatory Housing Practices and Policies	Secretary of Housing and Urban Development	January 26, 2021	January 29, 2021	86 FR 7487	2021-02074	
7	Tribal Consultation and Strengthening Nation-to-Nation Relationships	Heads of Executive Departments and Agencies	January 26, 2021	January 29, 2021	86 FR 7491	2021-02075	
8	Restoring Trust in Government Through Scientific Integrity and Evidence-Based Policymaking	Heads of Executive Departments and Agencies	January 27, 2021	February 10, 2021	86 FR 8845	2021-02839	
9	Protecting Women's Health at Home and Abroad	Secretary of State; Secretary of Defense; Secretary of Health and Human Services; Administrator of the United States Agency for International Development	January 28, 2021	June 24, 2021	86 FR 33077	2021-13638	
10	Maximizing Assistance From the Federal Emergency Management Agency To Respond to COVID-19	Secretary of Homeland Security; Administrator of the Federal Emergency Management Agency	February 2, 2021	February 5, 2021	86 FR 8281	2021-02569	
11	Domestic Policy Presidential Directive – 1 (DPPD-1)	Heads of Executive Departments and Agencies	May 6, 2021	—N/a	—N/a	—N/a	
12	Restoring the Department of Justice's Access-to-Justice Function and Reinvigorating the White House Legal Aid Interagency Roundtable	Heads of Executive Departments and Agencies	May 18, 2021	May 21, 2021	86 FR 27793	2021-10973	
13	Establishing the Fight Against Corruption as a Core United States National Security Interest (NSSM-1)	Heads of Executive Departments and Agencies	June 3, 2021	—N/a	—N/a	—N/a	
14	2020 Unified Command Plan	Secretary of Defense	June 4, 2021	June 9, 2021	86 FR 30533	2021-12221	
15	Delegation of Authority Under Section 1217(c) of Public Law 116-283	Secretary of State	June 8, 2021	June 22, 2021	86 FR 32629	2021-13207	
16	Delegation of Certain Authorities and Functions Under Section 353 of the United States-Northern Triangle Enhanced Engagement Act	Secretary of State	June 21, 2021	June 30, 2021	86 FR 34591	2021-14072	
17	Delegation of Certain Functions and Authorities Under the Women, Peace, and Security Act of 2017	Secretary of State; Secretary of Defense; Secretary of Homeland Security; Administrator of the United States Agency for International Development	June 29, 2021	July 6, 2021	86 FR 35383	2021-14498	
18	Expo 2027 Minnesota – Healthy People, Healthy Planet: Wellness and Well-Being for All	Secretary of State	June 29, 2021	—N/a	—N/a	—N/a	
19	Expo 2027 Minnesota – Healthy People, Healthy Planet: Wellness and Well-Being for All	Secretary of Commerce	June 29, 2021	—N/a	—N/a	—N/a	
20	Delegation of Authority Under Section 1285 of the National Defense Authorization Act for Fiscal Year 2020	Secretary of Defense	July 19, 2021	July 26, 2021	86 FR 39939	2021-15956	
21	Delegation of Authority Under Section 506(a)(2) of the Foreign Assistance Act of 1961	Secretary of State	July 23, 2021	July 29, 2021	86 FR 40913	2021-16379	
22	Deferred Enforced Departure for Certain Hong Kong Residents	Secretary of State; Secretary of Homeland Security	August 5, 2021	August 10, 2021	86 FR 43587	2021-17122	
23	Maximizing Assistance To Respond to COVID-19	Secretary of Homeland Security; Administrator of the Federal Emergency Management Agency	August 17, 2021	August 20, 2021	86 FR 46759	2021-18100	
24	Ensuring a Safe Return to In-Person School for the Nation's Children	Secretary of Education	August 18, 2021	August 23, 2021	86 FR 46951	2021-18223	
25	Delegation of Authority Under Section 506(a)(1) of the Foreign Assistance Act of 1961	Secretary of State	August 27, 2021	September 2, 2021	86 FR 49459	2021-19180	
26	Delegation of Authorities Under Sections 552(c)(2) and 506(a)(1) of the Foreign Assistance Act of 1961	Secretary of State	September 7, 2021	September 14, 2021	86 FR 50991	2021-19932	
27	Temporary Certification Regarding Disclosure of Information in Certain Records Related to the Assassination of President John F. Kennedy	Heads of Executive Departments and Agencies	October 22, 2021	October 27, 2021	86 FR 59599	2021-23563	
28	Delegation of Functions and Authorities Under Section 1299F(i) of the William M. (Mac) Thornberry National Defense Authorization Act for Fiscal Year 2021	Secretary of State	October 29, 2021	November 4, 2021	86 FR 60751	2021-24281	
29	Maximizing Assistance To Respond to COVID-19	Secretary of Homeland Security; Administrator of the Federal Emergency Management Agency	November 9, 2021	November 17, 2021	86 FR 64055	2021-25185	
30	Delegation of Authority Under Sections 110(c) and (d)(4) of the Trafficking Victims Protection Act of 2000	Secretary of State	December 21, 2021	—N/a	—N/a	—N/a	
31	Maximizing Assistance to Respond to COVID-19	Secretary of Health and Human Services; Secretary of Homeland Security; Administrator of the Federal Emergency Management Agency	December 27, 2021	January 3, 2022	87 FR 27	2021-28520	

=== 2022 ===
Relative no.	Title / Description	Addressed to	Date signed	Date published	FR citation	FR doc. no.	Ref.
32	Delegation of Authority Under Section 506(a)(1) and Section 614(a)(1) of the Foreign Assistance Act of 1961	Secretary of State	February 25, 2022	March 15, 2022	87 FR 14755	2022-05615	
33	Maximizing Assistance To Respond to COVID-19	Secretary of Homeland Security; Administrator of the Federal Emergency Management Agency	March 1, 2022	March 4, 2022	87 FR 12391	2022-04778	
34	Finding that a Drawdown and Sale of Petroleum from the Strategic Petroleum Reserve is Required by U.S. Obligations Under the International Energy Program Implemented by the International Energy Agency	Secretary of Energy	March 1, 2022	—N/a	—N/a	—N/a	
35	Delegation of Authority Under Section 506(a)(1) of the Foreign Assistance Act of 1961	Secretary of State	March 12, 2022	March 17, 2022	87 FR 15027	2022-05774	
36	Delegation of Authority Under Section 506(a)(1) of the Foreign Assistance Act of 1961	Secretary of State	March 16, 2022	March 23, 2022	87 FR 16365	2022-06275	
37	Delegation of Authority Under Section 552(c)(2) of the Foreign Assistance Act of 1961	Secretary of State	March 16, 2022	March 23, 2022	87 FR 16367	2022-06277	
38	Finding of a Severe Energy Supply Interruption	Secretary of Energy	March 31, 2022	—N/a	—N/a	—N/a	
39	Addressing the Long-Term Effects of COVID-19	Heads of Executive Departments and Agencies	April 5, 2022	April 8, 2022	87 FR 20995	2022-07756	
40	Delegation of Authority Under Section 506(a)(1) of the Foreign Assistance Act of 1961	Secretary of State	April 5, 2022	April 11, 2022	87 FR 21001	2022-07797	
41	Delegation of Authority Under Section 506(a)(1) of the Foreign Assistance Act of 1961	Secretary of State	April 13, 2022	April 20, 2022	87 FR 23419	2022-08536	
42	Delegation of Authority Under Section 506(a)(1) of the Foreign Assistance Act of 1961	Secretary of State	April 21, 2022	April 28, 2022	87 FR 25395	2022-09353	
43	Delegation of Authority Under Section 506(a)(1) and Section 614(a)(1) of the Foreign Assistance Act of 1961	Secretary of State	May 6, 2022	May 16, 2022	87 FR 29647	2022-10576	
44	Delegation of Authority Under Section 506(a)(1) and Section 614(a)(1) of the Foreign Assistance Act of 1961	Secretary of State	May 19, 2022	—N/a	—N/a	—N/a	
45	Delegation of Authority Under Section 506(a)(1) of the Foreign Assistance Act of 1961	Secretary of State	June 1, 2022	June 9, 2022	87 FR 35081	2022-12557	
46	Delegation of Authority Under Sections 1209 and 1236 of the National Defense Authorization Act for Fiscal Year 2015, as Amended	Secretary of Defense	June 3, 2022	June 8, 2022	87 FR 34763	2022-12464	
47	Delegation of Authority Under the European Energy Security and Diversification Act of 2019	Secretary of State	June 8, 2022	June 14, 2022	87 FR 35853	2022-12892	
48	Delegation of Authority Under Section 506(a)(1) of the Foreign Assistance Act of 1961	Secretary of State	June 15, 2022	June 24, 2022	87 FR 37975	2022-13745	
49	Establishment of the White House Task Force to Address Online Harassment and Abuse	Heads of Executive Departments and Agencies	June 16, 2022	June 22, 2022	87 FR 37431	2022-13496	
50	Prescription of Method of Designating a Member of the Military Sentencing Parameters and Criteria Board	Secretary of Defense	June 21, 2022	June 24, 2022	87 FR 37971	2022-13719	
51	Delegation of Authority Under Section 506(a)(1) of the Foreign Assistance Act of 1961	Secretary of State	June 23, 2022	June 30, 2022	87 FR 39321	2022-14197	
52	Partnership for Global Infrastructure and Investment	Heads of Executive Departments and Agencies	June 26, 2022	June 30, 2022	87 FR 39323	2022-14198	
53	Extending and Expanding Eligibility for Deferred Enforced Departure for Liberians	Secretary of State; Secretary of Homeland Security	June 27, 2022	June 29, 2022	87 FR 38871	2022-14082	
54	Delegation of Authority Under Section 506(a)(1) of the Foreign Assistance Act of 1961	Secretary of State	July 1, 2022	July 11, 2022	87 FR 41025	2022-14816	
55	Delegation of Authority Under Section 506(a)(1) of the Foreign Assistance Act of 1961	Secretary of State	July 8, 2022	July 14, 2022	87 FR 42059	2022-15183	
56	Delegation of Authority Under Section 506(a)(1) of the Foreign Assistance Act of 1961	Secretary of State	July 22, 2022	July 29, 2022	87 FR 45625	2022-16447	
57	Delegation of Authority Under Section 506(a)(1) of the Foreign Assistance Act of 1961	Secretary of State	August 1, 2022	August 9, 2022	87 FR 48599	2022-17237	
58	Delegation of Authority Under Section 506(a)(1) of the Foreign Assistance Act of 1961	Secretary of State	August 8, 2022	August 19, 2022	87 FR 51231	2022-18115	
59	Delegation of Authority Under Sections 102 and 106 of the CHIPS Act of 2022	Secretary of State; Secretary of Defense; Secretary of Commerce; Director of the National Science Foundation	August 9, 2022	August 15, 2022	87 FR 50233	2022-17672	
60	Delegation of Authority Under the Trans-Sahara Counterterrorism Partnership Program Act of 2022	Secretary of State	August 12, 2022	August 19, 2022	87 FR 51235	2022-18117	
61	Delegation of Authority Under Section 506(a)(1) of the Foreign Assistance Act of 1961	Secretary of State	August 19, 2022	August 26, 2022	87 FR 52659	2022-18623	
62	Delegation of Authority Under Section 614(a)(1) of the Foreign Assistance Act of 1961	Secretary of State	August 26, 2022	September 6, 2022	87 FR 54605	2022-19370	
63	Delegation of Authority Under Section 614(a)(1) of the Foreign Assistance Act of 1961	Secretary of State	August 26, 2022	September 6, 2022	87 FR 54607	2022-19372	
64	Delegation of Authority Under Section 506(a)(1) of the Foreign Assistance Act of 1961	Secretary of State	September 8, 2022	September 15, 2022	87 FR 56559	2022-20112	
65	Delegation of Authority Under Section 506(a)(1) of the Foreign Assistance Act of 1961	Secretary of State	September 15, 2022	September 23, 2022	87 FR 58249	2022-20849	
66	Delegation of Authority Under Section 610 of the Foreign Assistance Act of 1961, as Amended	Secretary of State	September 16, 2022	September 23, 2022	87 FR 58253	2022-20852	
67	Delegation of Authority Under Public Law 117-169	Director of the Office of Management and Budget	September 30, 2022	October 5, 2022	87 FR 60539	2022-21844	
68	Presidential Waiver of Statutory Requirements Pursuant to Section 303 of the Defense Production Act of 1950, as Amended	Secretary of Defense	October 3, 2022	October 6, 2022	87 FR 60545	2022-21912	
69	Delegation of Authority Under Section 506(a)(1) of the Foreign Assistance Act of 1961	Secretary of State	October 4, 2022	October 12, 2022	87 FR 61947	2022-22346	
70	Delegation of Authority Under Section 506(a)(1) of the Foreign Assistance Act of 1961	Secretary of State	October 14, 2022	October 24, 2022	87 FR 64359	2022-23260	
71	Delegation of Authority Under Section 506(a)(1) of the Foreign Assistance Act of 1961	Secretary of State	October 28, 2022	November 9, 2022	87 FR 67761	2022-24660	
72	Delegation of Authority Under Section 506(a)(1) of the Foreign Assistance Act of 1961	Secretary of State	November 10, 2022	November 21, 2022	87 FR 71201	2022-25522	
73	Delegation of Authority Under Section 506(a)(1) of the Foreign Assistance Act of 1961	Secretary of State	November 23, 2022	December 1, 2022	87 FR 73621	2022-26308	
74	Promoting Accountability for Conflict-Related Sexual Violence	Heads of Executive Departments and Agencies	November 28, 2022	December 6, 2022	87 FR 74485	2022-26604	
75	Uniform Standards for Tribal Consultation	Heads of Executive Departments and Agencies	November 30, 2022	December 5, 2022	87 FR 74479	2022-26555	
76	Delegation of Authority Under Section 506(a)(1) of the Foreign Assistance Act of 1961	Secretary of State	December 9, 2022	December 20, 2022	87 FR 77705	2022-27749	
77	Certifications Regarding Disclosure of Information in Certain Records Related to the Assassination of President John F. Kennedy	Heads of Executive Departments and Agencies	December 15, 2022	December 20, 2022	87 FR 77967	2022-27812	
78	Delegation of Authority Under Section 506(a)(1) of the Foreign Assistance Act of 1961	Secretary of State	December 21, 2022	December 28, 2022	87 FR 79787	2022-28355	

=== 2023 ===
Relative no.	Title / Description	Addressed to	Date signed	Date published	FR citation	FR doc. no.	Ref.
79	Delegation of Authority Under Section 506(a)(1) of the Foreign Assistance Act of 1961	Secretary of State	January 6, 2023	January 18, 2023	88 FR 2795	2023-00985	
80	Delegation of Authority Under Section 6501(b)(2) of the National Defense Authorization Act for Fiscal Year 2022	Administrator of the United States Agency for International Development	January 17, 2023	January 20, 2023	88 FR 3909	2023-01284	
81	Delegation of Authority Under Section 506(a)(1) of the Foreign Assistance Act of 1961	Secretary of State	January 19, 2023	January 26, 2023	88 FR 4891	2023-01738	
82	Further Efforts to Protect Access to Reproductive Healthcare Services	Attorney General; Secretary of Health and Human Services; Secretary of Homeland Security	January 22, 2023	January 26, 2023	88 FR 4895	2023-01691	
83	Extending and Expanding Eligibility for Deferred Enforced Departure for Certain Hong Kong Residents	Secretary of State; Secretary of Homeland Security	January 26, 2023	January 31, 2023	88 FR 6143	2023-02093	
84	Supporting Access to Leave for Federal Employees	Heads of Executive Departments and Agencies	February 2, 2023	February 7, 2023	88 FR 7833	2023-02670	
85	Delegation of Authority Under Section 506(a)(1) of the Foreign Assistance Act of 1961	Secretary of State	February 3, 2023	February 14, 2023	88 FR 9743	2023-03259	
86	Delegation of Authority Under Sections 506(a)(1) and 552(c)(2) of the Foreign Assistance Act of 1961	Secretary of State	February 20, 2023	February 27, 2023	88 FR 12539	2023-04153	
87	Presidential Waiver of Statutory Requirements Pursuant to Section 303 of the Defense Production Act of 1950, as Amended, on Department of Defense Supply Chains Resilience	Secretary of Defense	February 27, 2023	March 2, 2023	88 FR 13015	2023-04421	
88	Delegation of Authority Under Section 506(a)(1) of the Foreign Assistance Act of 1961	Secretary of State	March 3, 2023	March 13, 2023	88 FR 15267	2023-05219	
89	Delegation of Authority Under Section 506(a)(1) of the Foreign Assistance Act of 1961	Secretary of State	March 20, 2023	March 29, 2023	88 FR 18955	2023-06671	
90	Conserving the Natural and Cultural Heritage of the Pacific Remote Islands	Secretary of the Interior; Secretary of Commerce	March 24, 2023	March 30, 2023	88 FR 19201	2023-06837	
91	Delegation of Authority Under Section 506(a)(1) of the Foreign Assistance Act of 1961	Secretary of State	April 4, 2023	April 17, 2023	88 FR 23557	2023-08228	
92	Delegation of Authority Under Section 506(a)(1) of the Foreign Assistance Act of 1961	Secretary of State	April 19, 2023	May 1, 2023	88 FR 26467	2023-09297	
93	2022 Unified Command Plan	Secretary of Defense	April 25, 2023	April 28, 2023	88 FR 26219	2023-09182	
94	Delegation of Authority Under Section 5948(d) of the James M. Inhofe National Defense Authorization Act for Fiscal Year 2023	Secretary of State	April 25, 2023	May 1, 2023	88 FR 26469	2023-09299	
95	Delegation of Authority Under Section 506(a)(1) of the Foreign Assistance Act of 1961	Secretary of State	May 3, 2023	May 9, 2023	88 FR 29811	2023-09960	
96	Delegation of Authority Under Section 506(a)(1) of the Foreign Assistance Act of 1961	Secretary of State	May 21, 2023	June 2, 2023	88 FR 36211	2023-11902	
97	Delegation of Authority Under Section 7070 of the Department of State, Foreign Operations, and Related Programs Appropriations Act, 2023	Secretary of State	May 25, 2023	June 2, 2023	88 FR 36213	2023-11903	
98	Delegation of Authority Under Section 5583 of the James M. Inhofe National Defense Authorization Act for Fiscal Year 2023	Secretary of State	May 26, 2023	June 2, 2023	88 FR 36215	2023-11905	
99	Delegation of Authority Under Section 506(a)(1) of the Foreign Assistance Act of 1961	Secretary of State	May 31, 2023	TBD	TBD	TBD	

== National security memoranda ==
Relative no.	Series no.	Title / Description	Date signed	Date published	FR citation	FR doc. no.	Ref.
1	NSM-1	United States Global Leadership to Strengthen the International COVID-19 Response and to Advance Global Health Security and Biological Preparedness	January 21, 2021	—N/a	—N/a	—N/a	
2	NSM-2	Renewing the National Security Council System	February 4, 2021	—N/a	—N/a	—N/a	
3	NSM-3	Revitalizing America's Foreign Policy and National Security Workforce, Institutions, and Partnerships	February 4, 2021	—N/a	—N/a	—N/a	
4	NSM-4	Advancing the Human Rights of Lesbian, Gay, Bisexual, Transgender, Queer, and Intersex Persons Around the World	February 4, 2021	February 26, 2021	86 FR 11843	2021-04237	
5	NSM-5	Improving Cybersecurity for Critical Infrastructure Control Systems	July 28, 2021	—N/a	—N/a	—N/a	
8	NSM-8	Improving the Cybersecurity of National Security, Department of Defense, and Intelligence Community Systems	January 19, 2022	—N/a	—N/a	—N/a	
10	NSM-10	Promoting United States Leadership in Quantum Computing While Mitigating Risks to Vulnerable Cryptographic Systems	May 4, 2022	—N/a	—N/a	—N/a	
11	NSM-11	Combating Illegal, Unreported, and Unregulated Fishing and Associated Labor Abuses	June 27, 2022	—N/a	—N/a	—N/a	
12	NSM-12	The President's Intelligence Priorities	July 12, 2022	—N/a	—N/a	—N/a	
14	NSM-14	Partial Revocation of Presidential Policy Directive 28	October 7, 2022	—N/a	—N/a	—N/a	
15	NSM-15	Countering Biological Threats, Enhancing Pandemic Preparedness, and Achieving Global Health Security	October 18, 2022	—N/a	—N/a	—N/a	
16	NSM-16	Strengthening the Security and Resilience of United States Food and Agriculture	November 10, 2022	—N/a	—N/a	—N/a	
18	NSM-18	United States Conventional Arms Transfer Policy	February 23, 2023	—N/a	—N/a	—N/a	
19	NSM-19	Countering Weapons of Mass Destruction Terrorism and Advancing Nuclear and Radioactive Material Security	March 2, 2023	—N/a	—N/a	—N/a	
20	NSM-20	Safeguards and Accountability With Respect to Transferred Defense Articles and Defense Services	February 8, 2024	—N/a	—N/a	—N/a	
22	NSM-22	Critical Infrastructure Security and Resilience	April 30, 2023	—N/a	—N/a	—N/a	
23	NSM-23	United States Policy on the Antarctic Region	May 17, 2024	—N/a	—N/a	—N/a	
24	NSM-24	Prioritizing the Strategic Disruption of the Supply Chain for Illicit Fentanyl and Synthetic Opioids Through a Coordinated, Whole-of-Government, Information-Driven Effort	July 31, 2024	—N/a	—N/a	—N/a	
25	NSM-25	Advancing the United States’ Leadership in Artificial Intelligence; Harnessing Artificial Intelligence to Fulfill National Security Objectives; and Fostering the Safety, Security, and Trustworthiness of Artificial Intelligence	October 24, 2024	—N/a	—N/a	—N/a	

== Presidential determinations ==
=== FY2021 ===
Relative no.	Series no.	Title / Description	Addressed to	Date signed	Date published	FR citation	FR doc. no.	Ref.
1	2021-05	Emergency Presidential Determination on Refugee Admissions for Fiscal Year 2021	Secretary of State	April 16, 2021	April 22, 2021	86 FR 21159	2021-08545	
2	2021-06	Emergency Presidential Determination on Refugee Admissions for Fiscal Year 2021	Secretary of State	May 3, 2021	May 7, 2021	86 FR 24475	2021-09861	
3	2021-07	Presidential Determination Pursuant to Section 1245(d)(4)(B) and (C) of the National Defense Authorization Act for Fiscal Year 2012	Secretary of State; Secretary of the Treasury; Secretary of Energy	May 19, 2021	May 26, 2021	86 FR 28235	2021-11259	
4	2021-08	Unexpected Urgent Refugee and Migration Needs	Secretary of State	June 11, 2021	June 22, 2021	86 FR 32631	2021-13208	
5	2021-09	Unexpected Urgent Refugee and Migration Needs	Secretary of State	July 23, 2021	July 29, 2021	86 FR 40915	2021-16382	
6	2021-10	Continuation of U.S. Drug Interdiction Assistance to the Government of Colombia	Secretary of State; Secretary of Defense	August 10, 2021	August 13, 2021	86 FR 45619	2021-17551	
7	2021-11	Unexpected Urgent Refugee and Migration Needs	Secretary of State	August 16, 2021	August 20, 2021	86 FR 46757	2021-18062	
8	2021-12	Continuation of the Exercise of Certain Authorities Under the Trading With the Enemy Act	Secretary of State; Secretary of the Treasury	September 7, 2021	September 10, 2021	86 FR 50831	2021-19747	
9	2021-13	Presidential Determination on Major Drug Transit or Major Illicit Drug Producing Countries for Fiscal Year 2022	Secretary of State	September 15, 2021	September 22, 2021	86 FR 52819	2021-20737	

=== FY2022 ===
Relative no.	Series no.	Title / Description	Addressed to	Date signed	Date published	FR citation	FR doc. no.	Ref.
10	2022-01	Presidential Determination and Certification With Respect to the Child Soldiers Prevention Act of 2008	Secretary of State	October 8, 2021	October 18, 2021	86 FR 57525	2021-22759	
11	2022-02	Presidential Determination on Refugee Admissions for Fiscal Year 2022	Secretary of State	October 8, 2021	October 18, 2021	86 FR 57527	2021-22760	
12	2022-03	Unexpected Urgent Refugee and Migration Needs	Secretary of State	October 22, 2021	November 4, 2021	86 FR 60749	2021-24275	
13	2022-04	Presidential Determination Pursuant to Section 1245(d)(4)(B) and (C) of the National Defense Authorization Act for Fiscal Year 2012	Secretary of State; Secretary of the Treasury; Secretary of Energy	November 12, 2021	November 19, 2021	86 FR 64795	2021-25436	
14	2022-05	Presidential Determination on the Proposed Agreement between the Government of the United States of America, the Government of Australia, and the Government of the United Kingdom of Great Britain and Northern Ireland for the Exchange of Naval Nuclear Propulsion Information	Secretary of Energy	November 19, 2021	—N/a	—N/a	—N/a	
15	2022-06	Presidential Determination with Respect to the Efforts of Foreign Governments Regarding Trafficking in Persons	Secretary of State	December 21, 2021	—N/a	—N/a	—N/a	
16	2022-07	Presidential Determination Pursuant to Section 303 of the Defense Production Act of 1950, as Amended	Secretary of Defense	December 21, 2021	December 27, 2021	86 FR 73587	2021-28284	
17	2022-08	Presidential Determination Pursuant to Section 303 of the Defense Production Act of 1950, as Amended	Secretary of Defense	December 21, 2021	December 27, 2021	86 FR 73589	2021-28285	
18	2022-09	Unexpected Urgent Refugee and Migration Needs	Secretary of Defense	February 1, 2022	February 7, 2022	87 FR 6759	2022-02626	
19	2022-10	Designation of the State of Qatar as a Major Non-NATO Ally	Secretary of State	March 10, 2022	March 17, 2022	87 FR 6759	2022-05773	
20	2022-11	Presidential Determination Pursuant to Section 303 of the Defense Production Act of 1950, as Amended	Secretary of Defense	March 31, 2022	April 6, 2022	87 FR 19775	2022-07421	
21	2022-12	Presidential Determination Pursuant to Section 1245(d)(4)(B) and (C) of the National Defense Authorization Act for Fiscal Year 2012	Secretary of State; Secretary of the Treasury; Secretary of Energy	May 12, 2022	May 18, 2022	87 FR 30383	2022-10840	
22	2022-13	Delegating Authority Under the Defense Production Act To Ensure an Adequate Supply of Infant Formula	Secretary of Health and Human Services	May 18, 2022	May 24, 2022	87 FR 31357	2022-11273	
23	2022-14	Designation of Colombia as a Major Non-NATO Ally	Secretary of State	May 23, 2022	May 31, 2022	87 FR 32943	2022-11809	
24	2022-15	Presidential Determination Pursuant to Section 303 of the Defense Production Act of 1950, as Amended, on Solar Photovoltaic Modules and Module Components	Secretary of Energy	June 6, 2022	June 9, 2022	87 FR 35071	2022-12583	
25	2022-16	Presidential Determination Pursuant to Section 303 of the Defense Production Act of 1950, as Amended, on Insulation	Secretary of Energy	June 6, 2022	June 9, 2022	87 FR 35073	2022-12584	
26	2022-17	Presidential Determination Pursuant to Section 303 of the Defense Production Act of 1950, as Amended, on Electrolyzers, Fuel Cells, and Platinum Group Metals	Secretary of Energy	June 6, 2022	June 9, 2022	87 FR 35075	2022-12585	
27	2022-18	Presidential Determination Pursuant to Section 303 of the Defense Production Act of 1950, as Amended, on Electric Heat Pumps	Secretary of Energy	June 6, 2022	June 9, 2022	87 FR 35077	2022-12586	
28	2022-19	Presidential Determination Pursuant to Section 303 of the Defense Production Act of 1950, as Amended, on Transformers and Electric Power Grid Components	Secretary of Energy	June 6, 2022	June 9, 2022	87 FR 35079	2022-12587	
29	2022-20	Continuation of U.S. Drug Interdiction Assistance to the Government of Colombia	Secretary of State; Secretary of Defense	August 9, 2022	August 19, 2022	87 FR 51233	2022-18116	
30	2022-21	Presidential Determination on the Proposed Agreement To Extend the Agreement for Cooperation Between the United States of America and the Republic of South Africa Concerning Peaceful Uses of Nuclear Energy	Secretary of State; Secretary of Energy	August 25, 2022	September 6, 2022	87 FR 54603	2022-19366	
31	2022-22	Continuation of the Exercise of Certain Authorities Under the Trading With the Enemy Act	Secretary of State; Secretary of the Treasury	September 2, 2022	September 8, 2022	87 FR 54859	2022-19532	
32	2022-23	Presidential Determination on Major Drug Transit or Major Illicit Drug Producing Countries for Fiscal Year 2023	Secretary of State	September 15, 2022	September 23, 2022	87 FR 58251	2022-20851	
33	2022-24	Terminating the Designation of Afghanistan as a Major Non-NATO Ally	Secretary of State	September 23, 2022	October 4, 2022	87 FR 60057	2022-21654	
34	2022-25	Presidential Determination on Refugee Admissions for Fiscal Year 2023	Secretary of State	September 27, 2022	October 6, 2022	87 FR 60547	2022-21913	

=== FY2023 ===
Relative no.	Series no.	Title / Description	Addressed to	Date signed	Date published	FR citation	FR doc. no.	Ref.
35	2023-01	Presidential Determination and Certification With Respect to the Child Soldiers Prevention Act of 2008	Secretary of State	October 3, 2022	October 12, 2022	87 FR 61943	2022-22338	
36	2023-02	Presidential Determination With Respect to the Efforts of Foreign Governments Regarding Trafficking in Persons	Secretary of State	October 14, 2022	October 24, 2022	87 FR 64361	2022-23262	
37	2023-03	Presidential Determination Pursuant to Section 1245(d)(4)(B) and (C) of the National Defense Authorization Act for Fiscal Year 2012	Secretary of State; Secretary of the Treasury; Secretary of Energy	January 30, 2023	February 8, 2023	88 FR 8347	2023-02839	
38	2023-04	Unexpected Urgent Refugee and Migration Needs	Secretary of State	February 24, 2023	March 13, 2023	88 FR 15265	2023-05218	
39	2023-05	Presidential Determination Pursuant to Section 303 of the Defense Production Act of 1950, as Amended, on Airbreathing Engines, Advanced Avionics Position Navigation and Guidance Systems, and Constituent Materials for Hypersonic Systems	Secretary of Defense	March 1, 2023	March 6, 2023	88 FR 13657	2023-04617	
40	2023-06	Presidential Determination Pursuant to Section 303 of the Defense Production Act of 1950, as Amended, on Printed Circuit Boards and Advanced Packaging Production Capability	Secretary of Defense	March 27, 2023	March 31, 2023	88 FR 19545	2023-06921	
41	2023-07	Unexpected Urgent Refugee and Migration Needs	Secretary of State	May 1, 2023	May 9, 2023	88 FR 29809	2023-09959	
42	2023-08	Presidential Determination Pursuant to Section 1245(d)(4)(B) and (C) of the National Defense Authorization Act for Fiscal Year 2012	Secretary of State; Secretary of the Treasury; Secretary of Energy	May 11, 2023	May 19, 2023	88 FR 32619	2023-10913	

== Presidential sequestration orders ==
Relative no.	Title / Description	Date signed	Date published	FR citation	FR doc. no.	Ref.
1	Sequestration Order for Fiscal Year 2022 Pursuant to Section 251A of the Balanced Budget and Emergency Deficit Control Act, as Amended	May 28, 2021	June 3, 2021	86 FR 29927	2021-11819	
2	Sequestration Order for Fiscal Year 2023 Pursuant to Section 251A of the Balanced Budget and Emergency Deficit Control Act, as Amended	March 28, 2022	March 31, 2022	87 FR 18603	2022-06939	
3	Sequestration Order for Fiscal Year 2024 Pursuant to Section 251A of the Balanced Budget and Emergency Deficit Control Act, as Amended	March 13, 2023	March 16, 2023	88 FR 16171	2023-05511	

== Presidential notices ==
=== 2021 ===
Relative no.	Original EO or PR no.	Title / Description	Date signed	Date published	FR citation	FR doc. no.	Ref.
1	EO 13566	Continuation of the National Emergency With Respect to Libya	February 11, 2021	February 16, 2021	86 FR 9835	2021-03262	
2	PR 9994	Continuation of the National Emergency Concerning the Coronavirus Disease 2019 (COVID-19) Pandemic	February 22, 2021	February 26, 2021	86 FR 11597	2021-04173	
3	PR 6867	Continuation of the National Emergency with Respect to Cuba and of the Emergency Authority Relating to the Regulation of the Anchorage and Movement of Vessels	February 22, 2021	February 26, 2021	86 FR 11601	2021-04174	
4	EO 13660	Continuation of the National Emergency With Respect to Ukraine	March 2, 2021	March 4, 2021	86 FR 12793	2021-04759	
5	EO 13692	Continuation of the National Emergency With Respect to Venezuela	March 2, 2021	March 4, 2021	86 FR 12795	2021-04760	
6	EO 13288	Continuation of the National Emergency With Respect to Zimbabwe	March 2, 2021	March 4, 2021	86 FR 12797	2021-04761	
7	EO 12957	Continuation of the National Emergency with Respect to Iran	March 5, 2021	March 9, 2021	86 FR 13621	2021-05037	
8	EO 13694	Continuation of the National Emergency with Respect to Significant Malicious Cyber-Enabled Activities	March 29, 2021	March 30, 2021	86 FR 16663	2021-06738	
9	EO 13664	Continuation of the National Emergency with Respect to South Sudan	March 29, 2021	March 30, 2021	86 FR 16665	2021-06743	
10	EO 13536	Continuation of the National Emergency with Respect to Somalia	April 1, 2021	April 5, 2021	86 FR 17673	2021-07124	
11	EO 13338	Continuation of the National Emergency With Respect to the Actions of the Government of Syria	May 6, 2021	May 10, 2021	86 FR 25793	2021-09993	
12	EO 13667	Continuation of the National Emergency With Respect to the Central African Republic	May 6, 2021	May 10, 2021	86 FR 25795	2021-09995	
13	EO 13303	Continuation of the National Emergency With Respect to the Stabilization of Iraq	May 6, 2021	May 10, 2021	86 FR 25797	2021-09996	
14	EO 13873	Continuation of the National Emergency With Respect to Securing the Information and Communications Technology and Services Supply Chain	May 11, 2021	May 13, 2021	86 FR 26339	2021-10282	
15	EO 13611	Continuation of the National Emergency With Respect to Yemen	May 11, 2021	May 13, 2021	86 FR 26341	2021-10284	
16	EO 13219	Continuation of the National Emergency With Respect to the Western Balkans	June 8, 2021	June 10, 2021	86 FR 31083	2021-12383	
17	EO 13405	Continuation of the National Emergency With Respect to the Actions and Policies of Certain Members of the Government of Belarus and Other Persons To Undermine Democratic Processes or Institutions of Belarus	June 8, 2021	June 10, 2021	86 FR 31085	2021-12386	
18	EO 13466	Continuation of the National Emergency With Respect to North Korea	June 21, 2021	June 23, 2021	86 FR 33075	2021-13536	
19	EO 13936	Continuation of the National Emergency With Respect to Hong Kong	July 7, 2021	July 9, 2021	86 FR 36479	2021-14806	
20	EO 13581	Continuation of the National Emergency With Respect to Transnational Criminal Organizations	July 7, 2021	July 9, 2021	86 FR 36481	2021-14814	
21	EO 13441	Continuation of the National Emergency With Respect to Lebanon	July 20, 2021	July 22, 2021	86 FR 38901	2021-15808	
22	EO 13882	Continuation of the National Emergency With Respect to Mali	July 20, 2021	July 22, 2021	86 FR 38903	2021-15824	
23	EO 13441	Continuation of the National Emergency With Respect to Export Control Regulations	August 6, 2021	August 10, 2021	86 FR 43901	2021-17195	
24	EO 13848	Continuation of the National Emergency With Respect to Foreign Interference in or Undermining Public Confidence in United States Elections	September 7, 2021	September 9, 2021	86 FR 50601	2021-19625	
25	PR 7463	Continuation of the National Emergency With Respect to Certain Terrorist Attacks	September 9, 2021	September 10, 2021	86 FR 50835	2021-19788	
26	EO 13224	Continuation of the National Emergency With Respect to Persons Who Commit, Threaten To Commit, or Support Terrorism	September 15, 2021	September 17, 2021	86 FR 52069	2021-20351	
27	EO 13894	Continuation of the National Emergency With Respect to the Situation in and in Relation to Syria	October 6, 2021	October 12, 2021	86 FR 56829	2021-22302	
28	EO 12978	Continuation of the National Emergency With Respect to Significant Narcotics Traffickers Centered in Colombia	October 12, 2021	October 14, 2021	86 FR 57319	2021-22597	
29	EO 13413	Continuation of the National Emergency With Respect to the Democratic Republic of the Congo	October 25, 2021	October 26, 2021	86 FR 59277	2021-23463	
30	EO 13067	Continuation of the National Emergency With Respect to Sudan	October 29, 2021	November 1, 2021	86 FR 60355	2021-23963	
31	EO 12170	Continuation of the National Emergency With Respect to Iran	November 9, 2021	November 10, 2021	86 FR 62709	2021-24847	
32	EO 13959	Continuation of the National Emergency With Respect to the Threat From Securities Investments That Finance Certain Companies of the People's Republic of China	November 9, 2021	November 10, 2021	86 FR 62711	2021-24848	
33	EO 12938	Continuation of the National Emergency With Respect to the Proliferation of Weapons of Mass Destruction	November 10, 2021	November 12, 2021	86 FR 62891	2021-24969	
34	EO 13851	Continuation of the National Emergency With Respect to the Situation in Nicaragua	November 16, 2021	November 18, 2021	86 FR 64793	2021-25340	
35	EO 13818	Continuation of the National Emergency With Respect to Serious Human Rights Abuse and Corruption	December 16, 2021	December 17, 2021	86 FR 71791	2021-27570	

=== 2022 ===
Relative no.	Original EO or PR no.	Title / Description	Date signed	Date published	FR citation	FR doc. no.	Ref.
36	EO 14014	Continuation of the National Emergency With Respect to the Situation in and in Relation to Burma	February 7, 2022	February 9, 2022	87 FR 7677	2022-02934	
37	PR 9994	Continuation of the National Emergency Concerning the Coronavirus Disease 2019 (COVID-19) Pandemic	February 18, 2022	February 23, 2022	87 FR 10289	2022-03972	
38	EO 13566	Continuation of the National Emergency With Respect to Libya	February 22, 2022	February 24, 2022	87 FR 10681	2022-04104	
39	PR 6867	Continuation of the National Emergency With Respect to Cuba and of the Emergency Authority Relating to the Regulation of the Anchorage and Movement of Vessels	February 23, 2022	February 24, 2022	87 FR 10685	2022-04144	
40	EO 13660	Continuation of the National Emergency With Respect to Ukraine	March 2, 2022	March 3, 2022	87 FR 12387	2022-04744	
41	EO 13288	Continuation of the National Emergency With Respect to Zimbabwe	March 3, 2022	March 4, 2022	87 FR 12553	2022-04879	
42	EO 12957	Continuation of the National Emergency With Respect to Iran	March 3, 2022	March 7, 2022	87 FR 12555	2022-04907	
43	EO 13692	Continuation of the National Emergency With Respect to Venezuela	March 3, 2022	March 7, 2022	87 FR 12557	2022-04908	
44	EO 13694	Continuation of the National Emergency With Respect to Significant Malicious Cyber-Enabled Activities	March 30, 2022	March 31, 2022	87 FR 18963	2022-07025	
45	EO 13664	Continuation of the National Emergency With Respect to South Sudan	March 30, 2022	March 31, 2022	87 FR 18965	2022-07026	
46	EO 13536	Continuation of the National Emergency With Respect to Somalia	March 30, 2022	April 1, 2022	87 FR 19343	2022-07103	
47	EO 14024	Continuation of the National Emergency With Respect to Specified Harmful Foreign Activities of the Government of the Russian Federation	April 13, 2022	April 14, 2022	87 FR 22431	2022-08244	
48	EO 13338	Continuation of the National Emergency With Respect to the Actions of the Government of Syria	May 9, 2022	May 10, 2022	87 FR 28749	2022-10180	
49	EO 13667	Continuation of the National Emergency With Respect to the Central African Republic	May 9, 2022	May 11, 2022	87 FR 29019	2022-10325	
50	EO 13303	Continuation of the National Emergency With Respect to the Stabilization of Iraq	May 9, 2022	May 11, 2022	87 FR 29021	2022-10326	
51	EO 13611	Continuation of the National Emergency With Respect to Yemen	May 9, 2022	May 11, 2022	87 FR 29023	2022-10328	
52	EO 13873	Continuation of the National Emergency With Respect to Securing the Information and Communications Technology and Services Supply Chain	May 12, 2022	May 13, 2022	87 FR 29645	2022-10561	
53	EO 13405	Continuation of the National Emergency With Respect to Belarus	June 13, 2022	June 15, 2022	87 FR 36047	2022-13034	
54	EO 13466	Continuation of the National Emergency With Respect to North Korea	June 13, 2022	June 15, 2022	87 FR 36049	2022-13035	
55	EO 13219	Continuation of the National Emergency With Respect to the Western Balkans	June 13, 2022	June 15, 2022	87 FR 36051	2022-13036	
56	EO 13936	Continuation of the National Emergency With Respect to Hong Kong	July 11, 2022	July 13, 2022	87 FR 42057	2022-15140	
57	EO 13581	Continuation of the National Emergency With Respect to Transnational Criminal Organizations	July 21, 2022	July 22, 2022	87 FR 43983	2022-15973	
58	EO 13882	Continuation of the National Emergency With Respect to Mali	July 22, 2022	July 25, 2022	87 FR 44263	2022-16090	
59	EO 13441	Continuation of the National Emergency With Respect to Lebanon	July 28, 2022	July 29, 2022	87 FR 46881	2022-16516	
60	EO 13222	Continuation of the National Emergency With Respect to Export Control Regulations	August 4, 2022	August 5, 2022	87 FR 48077	2022-17049	
61	EO 13848	Continuation of the National Emergency With Respect To Foreign Interference in or Undermining Public Confidence in United States Elections	September 7, 2022	September 9, 2022	87 FR 55681	2022-19701	
62	PR 7463	Continuation of the National Emergency With Respect to Certain Terrorist Attacks	September 9, 2022	September 12, 2022	87 FR 55897	2022-19861	
63	EO 14046	Continuation of the National Emergency With Respect to Ethiopia	September 9, 2022	September 12, 2022	87 FR 55899	2022-19863	
64	EO 13224	Continuation of the National Emergency With Respect to Persons Who Commit, Threaten To Commit, or Support Terrorism	September 19, 2022	September 21, 2022	87 FR 57569	2022-20582	
65	EO 12978	Continuation of the National Emergency With Respect to Significant Narcotics Traffickers Centered in Colombia	October 12, 2022	October 13, 2022	87 FR 62279	2022-22471	
66	EO 13894	Continuation of the National Emergency With Respect to the Situation in and in Relation to Syria	October 12, 2022	October 13, 2022	87 FR 62281	2022-22472	
67	EO 13413	Continuation of the National Emergency With Respect to the Democratic Republic of the Congo	October 13, 2022	October 17, 2022	87 FR 62975	2022-22672	
68	EO 13067	Continuation of the National Emergency With Respect to Sudan	November 1, 2022	November 2, 2022	87 FR 66225	2022-24046	
69	EO 13959	Continuation of the National Emergency With Respect to the Threat From Securities Investments That Finance Certain Companies of the People's Republic of China	November 8, 2022	November 10, 2022	87 FR 68017	2022-24787	
70	EO 12170	Continuation of the National Emergency With Respect to Iran	November 8, 2022	November 10, 2022	87 FR 68013	2022-24779	
71	EO 12938	Continuation of the National Emergency With Respect to the Proliferation of Weapons of Mass Destruction	November 8, 2022	November 10, 2022	87 FR 68015	2022-24784	
72	EO 13851	Continuation of the National Emergency With Respect to the Situation in Nicaragua	November 10, 2022	November 15, 2022	87 FR 68589	2022-25006	
73	EO 13818	Continuation of the National Emergency With Respect to Serious Human Rights Abuse and Corruption	December 12, 2022	December 14, 2022	87 FR 76547	2022-27270	
74	EO 14059	Continuation of the National Emergency With Respect to the Global Illicit Drug Trade	December 12, 2022	December 14, 2022	87 FR 76549	2022-27271	

=== 2023 ===
Relative no.	Original EO or PR no.	Title / Description	Date signed	Date published	FR citation	FR doc. no.	Ref.
75	EO 14064	Continuation of the National Emergency With Respect to the Widespread Humanitarian Crisis in Afghanistan and the Potential for a Deepening Economic Collapse in Afghanistan	February 3, 2023	February 7, 2023	88 FR 7837	2023-02671	
76	EO 14014	Continuation of the National Emergency With Respect to the Situation in and in Relation to Burma	February 6, 2023	February 7, 2023	88 FR 8205	2023-02770	
77	PR 9994	Continuation of the National Emergency Concerning the Coronavirus Disease 2019 (COVID-19) Pandemic	February 10, 2023	February 14, 2023	88 FR 9385	2023-03218	
78	PR 6867	Continuation of the National Emergency With Respect to Cuba and of the Emergency Authority Relating to the Regulation of the Anchorage and Movement of Vessels	February 17, 2023	February 21, 2023	88 FR 10821	2023-03746	
79	EO 13566	Continuation of the National Emergency With Respect to Libya	February 17, 2023	February 21, 2023	88 FR 10823	2023-03747	
80	EO 13660	Continuation of the National Emergency With Respect to Ukraine	March 1, 2023	March 2, 2023	88 FR 13285	2023-04522	
81	EO 13692	Continuation of the National Emergency With Respect to Venezuela	March 1, 2023	March 2, 2023	88 FR 13287	2023-04531	
82	EO 13288	Continuation of the National Emergency With Respect to Zimbabwe	March 1, 2023	March 2, 2023	88 FR 13289	2023-04532	
83	EO 12957	Continuation of the National Emergency With Respect to Iran	March 10, 2023	March 13, 2023	88 FR 15595	2023-05300	
84	EO 13694	Continuation of the National Emergency With Respect to Significant Malicious Cyber-Enabled Activities	March 29, 2023	March 30, 2023	88 FR 19209	2023-06881	
85	EO 13664	Continuation of the National Emergency With Respect to South Sudan	March 29, 2023	March 30, 2023	88 FR 19211	2023-06882	
86	EO 13536	Continuation of the National Emergency With Respect to Somalia	April 7, 2023	April 10, 2023	88 FR 21455	2023-07692	
87	EO 14024	Continuation of the National Emergency With Respect to Specified Harmful Foreign Activities of the Government of the Russian Federation	April 7, 2023	April 10, 2023	88 FR 21457	2023-07702	
88	PR 10371	Continuation of the National Emergency and of the Emergency Authority Relating to the Regulation of the Anchorage and Movement of Russian-Affiliated Vessels to United States Ports	April 18, 2023	April 20, 2023	88 FR 24327	2023-08501	
89	EO 13338	Continuation of the National Emergency With Respect to the Actions of the Government of Syria	May 8, 2023	May 10, 2023	88 FR 30211	2023-10143	
90	EO 13873	Continuation of the National Emergency With Respect to Securing the Information and Communications Technology and Services Supply Chain	May 10, 2023	May 11, 2023	88 FR 30635	2023-10314	
91	EO 13667	Continuation of the National Emergency With Respect to the Central African Republic	May 10, 2023	May 11, 2023	88 FR 30637	2023-10315	
92	EO 13611	Continuation of the National Emergency With Respect to Yemen	May 11, 2023	May 15, 2023	88 FR 31141	2023-10487	
93	EO 13303	Continuation of the National Emergency With Respect to the Stabilization of Iraq	May 16, 2023	May 17, 2023	88 FR 31601	2023-10756	

== See also ==
- Executive order
- List of executive actions by Barack Obama, EO #13489–13764 (2009–2017)
- List of executive actions by Donald Trump
- List of executive orders in the first Trump presidency, EO #13765–13984 (2017–2021)
- List of executive orders in the second Trump presidency, EO #14147–present (2025–present)
- List of bills in the 117th United States Congress
- List of bills in the 118th United States Congress
