= Executive Order 14059 =

Executive order signed by U.S. President Joe Biden

- "Imposing Sanctions on Foreign Persons Involved in the Global Illicit Drug Trade"
- Type: Executive order
- Number: 14059
- President: Joe Biden
- Signed: December 15, 2021

Federal Register details
- Federal Register document number: 2021-27505
- Publication date: December 15, 2021

Summary
- Sanctions Against Foreigners Involved in the Global Illicit Drug Trade

Executive Order 14059, officially titled Imposing Sanctions on Foreign Persons Involved in the Global Illicit Drug Trade, was signed on December 15, 2021, and is the 75th executive order signed by U.S. President Joe Biden. The telos of the order is to enforce sanctions upon foreigners involved in global illicit drug trade.

== Provisions ==
Illicit drug trafficking into the United States, including fentanyl and other synthetic opioids, kills tens of thousands of Americans each year, as well as countless more non-fatal overdoses that have their own devastating toll on human life. The principal suppliers of illegal narcotics and precursor chemicals that drive the present opioid crisis, as well as drug-related violence that harms communities, are drug cartels, transnational criminal organizations, and their facilitators. International drug trafficking poses an unusual and extraordinary threat to the United States' national security, foreign policy, and economy. Because of this grave threat, the United States must modernize and update its drug-trafficking response.

== Effects ==
The executive order authorizes the Secretary of the Treasury, in coordination with the Secretaries of State and Homeland Security and the Attorney General, to impose sanctions on designated foreign persons. The Treasury Secretary may select from multiple sanctioning options when determining that a foreign person meets specified criteria.

The order's restrictions apply universally, except where permitted by subsequent legislation, regulations, orders, directives, or licenses. These restrictions supersede any prior contracts, licenses, or permissions.

The order suspends entry into the United States for certain undocumented migrants who meet designated criteria and are subject to specific sanctions, as their entry is deemed detrimental to U.S. interests. This suspension applies to both immigrant and nonimmigrant entry, with exceptions determinable by the Secretary of State or Attorney General.

The order prohibits:

- Contributing or providing funds, goods, or services to individuals whose property is blocked under the order
- Receiving contributions, funds, goods, or services from blocked individuals
- Engaging in transactions that evade or attempt to evade the order's restrictions

The restrictions apply notwithstanding any prior agreements or permissions, unless specifically exempted through official channels.

Under the Order the Treasury has sanctioned:

- Michel Martelly (2024)
- Gustavo Petro (2025)

== See also ==
- List of executive actions by Joe Biden
- 2020 United States census
- Foreign Narcotics Kingpin Designation Act
