= List of executive orders in the second Trump presidency =

As the 47th president of the United States, Donald Trump has relied extensively on executive orders. In the first year of his second presidency he signed 232 executive orders, surpassing the 220 orders of his entire first term. In the first 100 days of his presidency, Trump signed 143 executive orders, more than any other president had signed in their first 100 days in office. Franklin D. Roosevelt previously held the record, signing 99 executive orders in 1933.

On his first day in office, Trump issued 26 executive orders, the most of any president on their first day in office. The executive orders rescinded many of the previous administration's executive actions, began the withdrawal process from the World Health Organization and Paris Agreement, rolled back federal recognition of gender identity, founded the Department of Government Efficiency, reaffirmed the existing constitutional right to free speech, reversed the withdrawal of Cuba's designation as a state sponsor of terrorism, reversed sanctions on Israeli settlers, rolled back policy on artificial intelligence, reversed the Family Reunification Task Force, pardoned over 1,500 January 6 rioters, designated Mexican drug cartels as foreign terrorist organizations, attempted to end birthright citizenship for new children of illegal immigrants and immigrants legally but temporarily present in the U.S. (such as those on student, work, or tourist visas), delayed the government's ban of TikTok, and declared a national emergency on the southern border, triggering the deployment of the U.S. military.

Several of Trump's orders have been considered to have ignored or violated federal laws, regulations, and the Constitution. Some have been blocked in court for these reasons. Four days into his presidency, an analysis conducted by Time found that nearly two-thirds of his executive actions "mirror or partially mirror" proposals from Project 2025, which was seconded by analysis from Bloomberg Government.

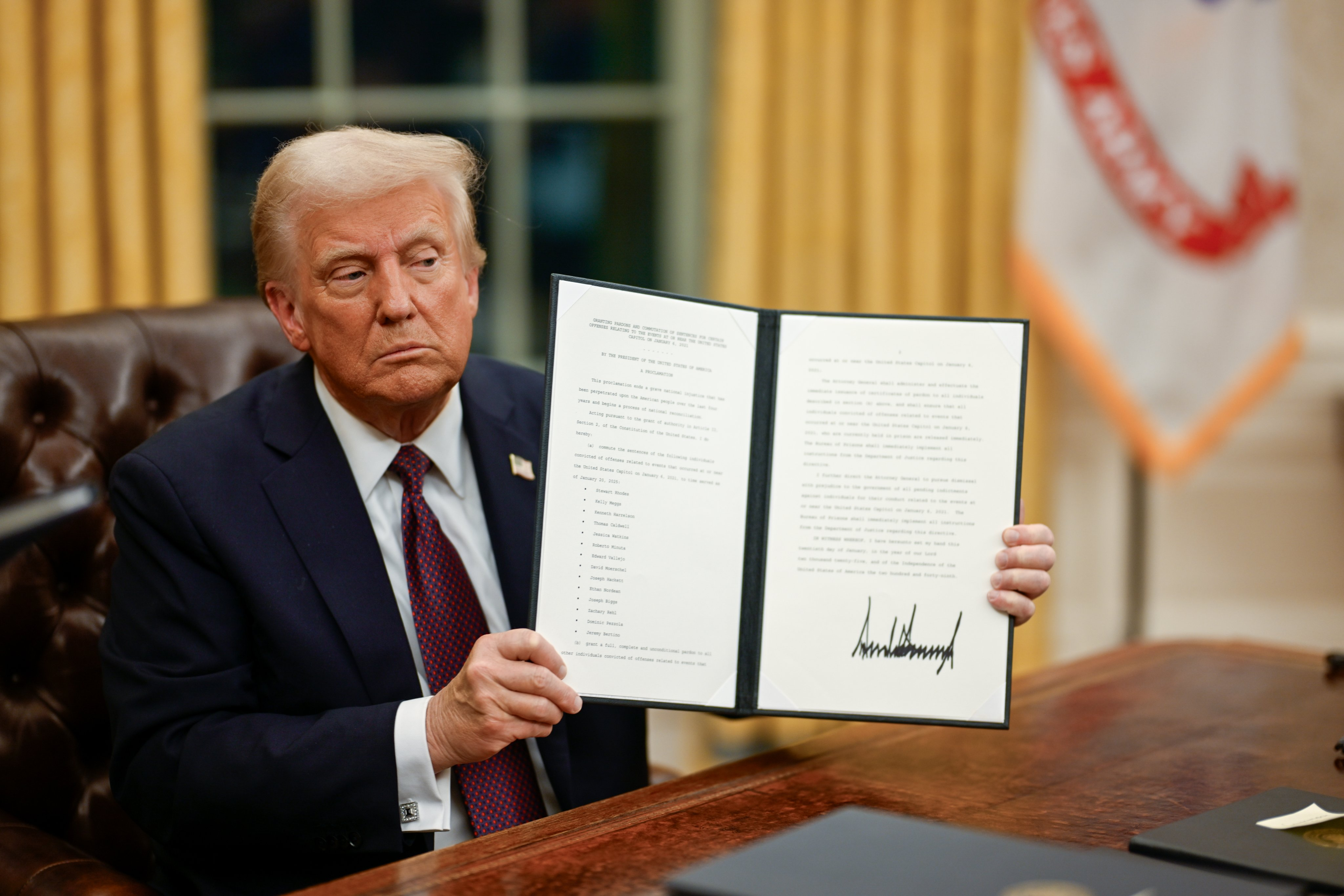
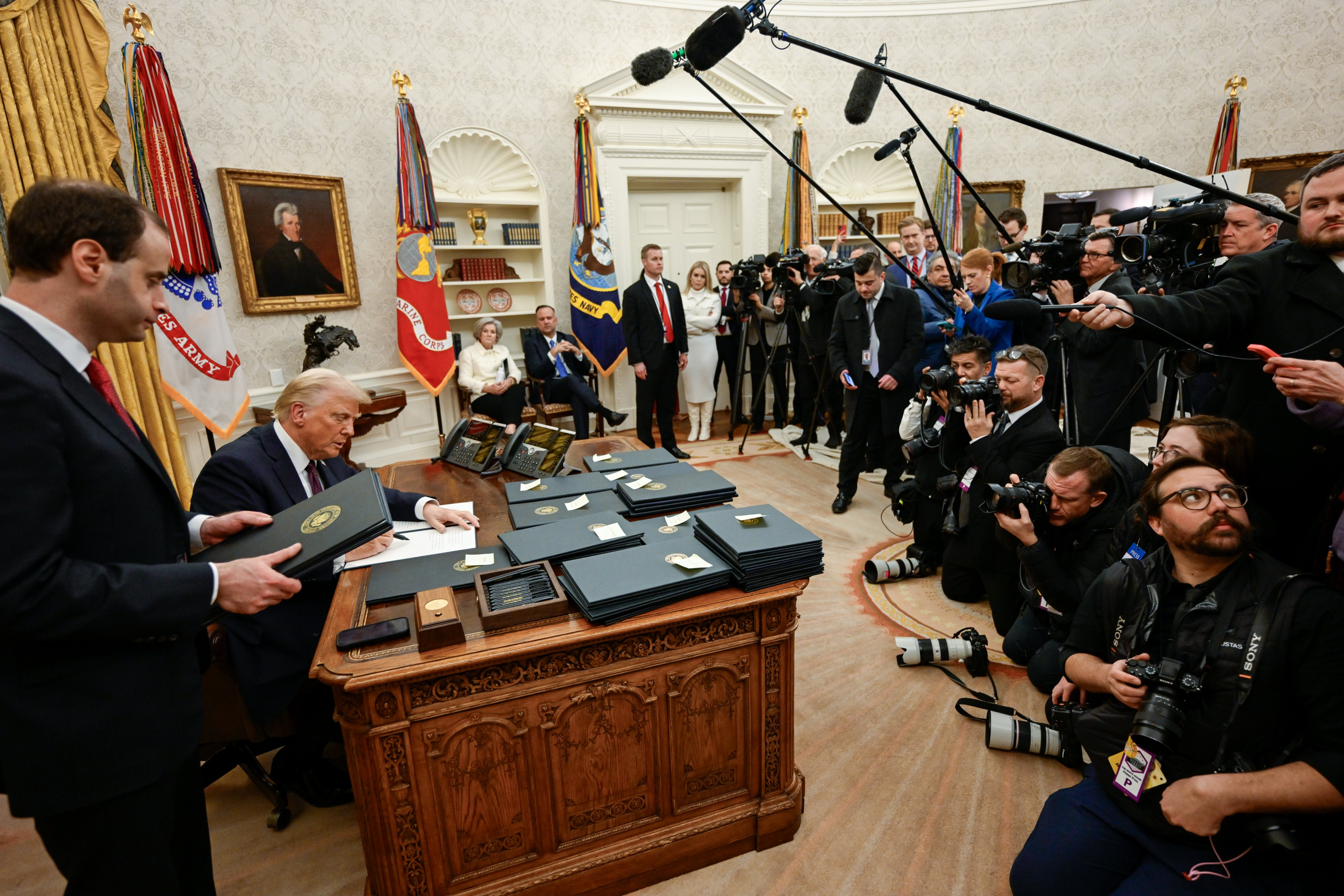
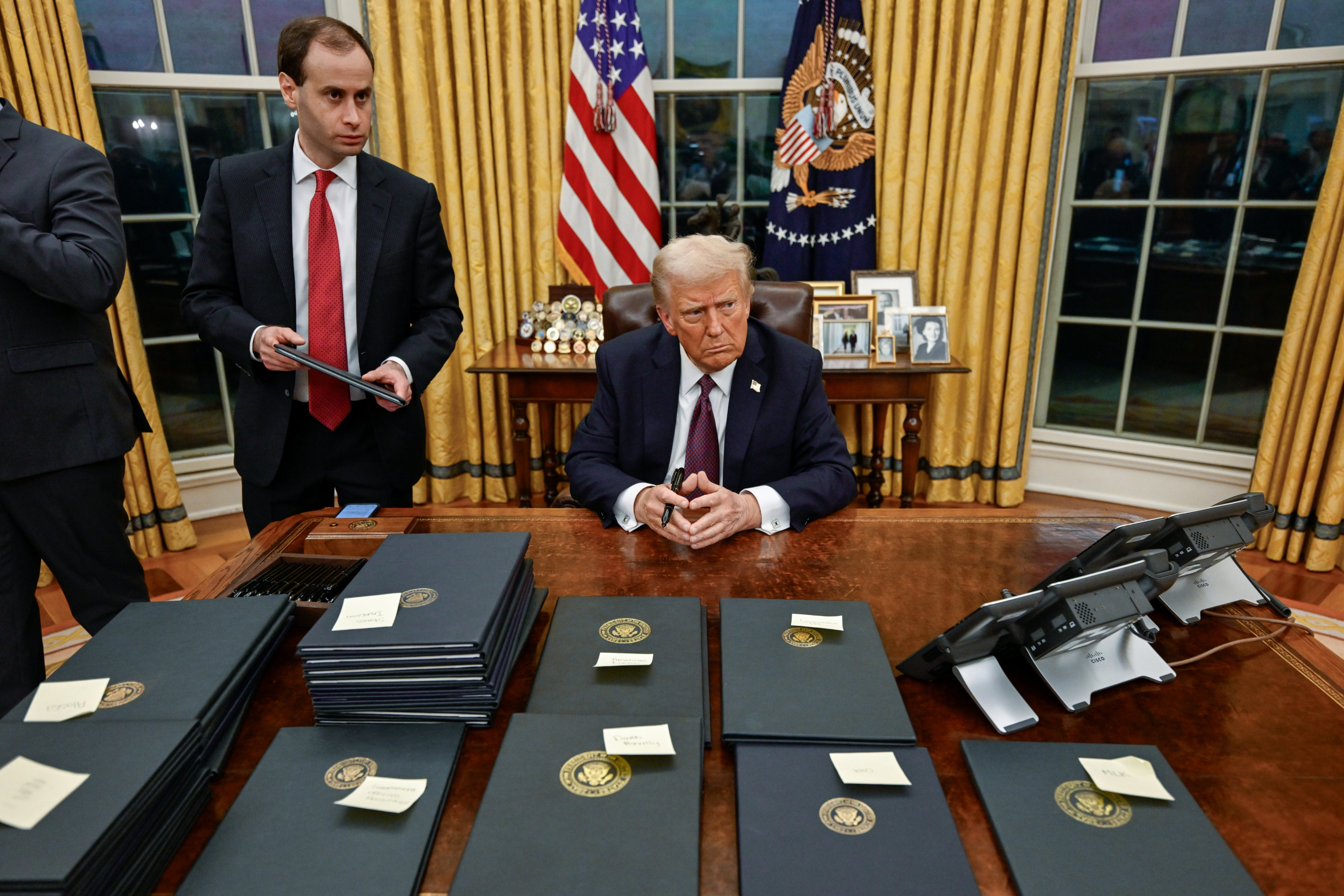
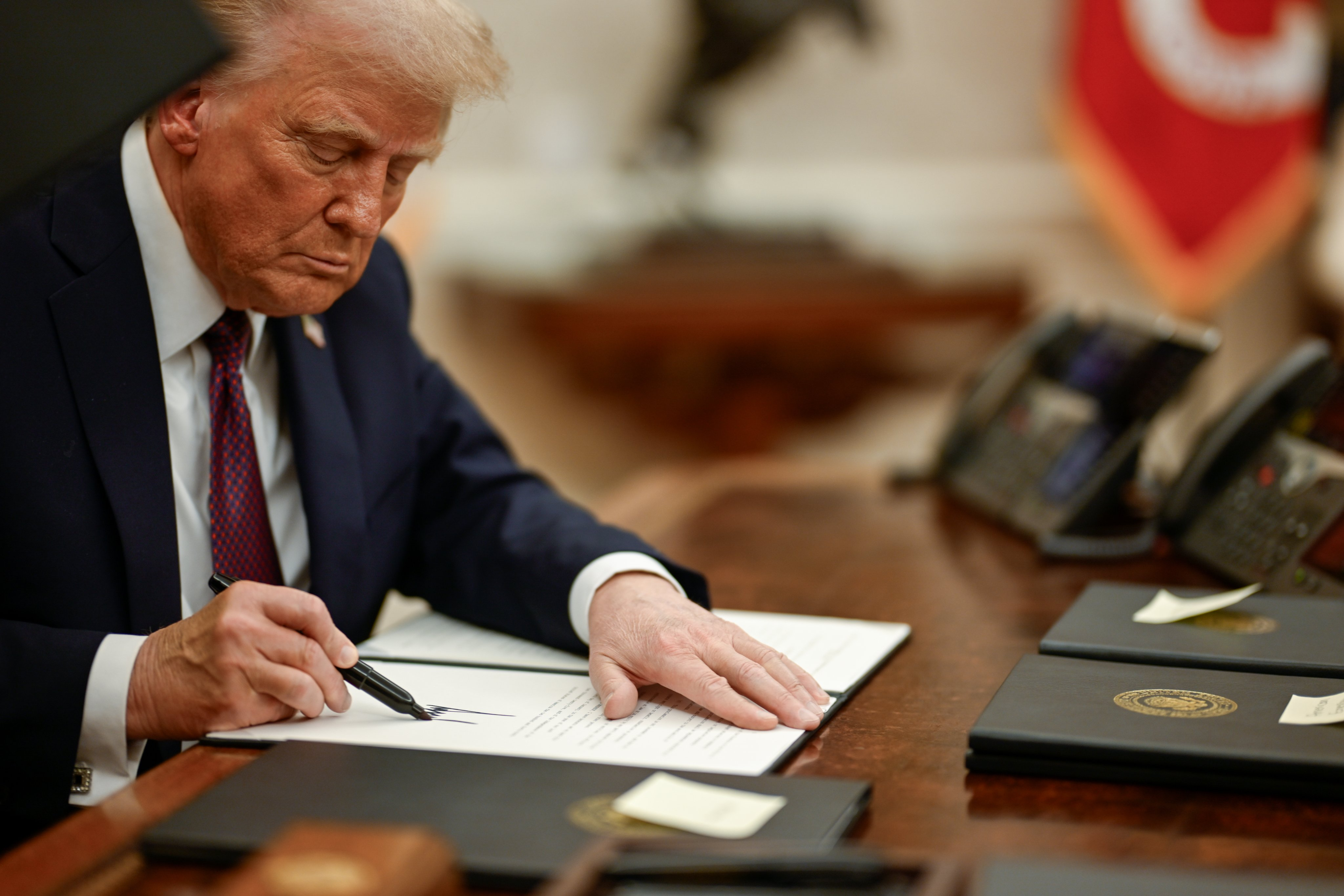
Donald Trump, on his first day as president during his second term, signing executive orders and taking press questions in the Oval Office on January 20, 2025

== 2025 ==
Relative EO #	Absolute EO #	Title	Date signed	Date published	Federal Register citation	Federal Register doc. #	Full text	Notes
1	14147^{[ws]}	Ending the Weaponization of the Federal Government	Jan 20, 2025	Jan 28, 2025	90 FR 8235	2025-01900		
2	14148^{[ws]}	Initial Rescissions of Harmful Executive Orders and Actions	Jan 20, 2025	Jan 28, 2025	90 FR 8237	2025-01901		
3	14149^{[ws]}	Restoring Freedom of Speech and Ending Federal Censorship	Jan 20, 2025	Jan 28, 2025	90 FR 8243	2025-01902		
4	14150^{[ws]}	America First Policy Directive to the Secretary of State	Jan 20, 2025	Jan 29, 2025	90 FR 8337	2025-01952		
5	14151^{[ws]}	Ending Radical and Wasteful Government DEI Programs and Preferencing	Jan 20, 2025	Jan 29, 2025	90 FR 8339	2025-01953		Partly blocked in court; Supreme Court stayed restraining order pending appeal
6	14152^{[ws]}	Holding Former Government Officials Accountable for Election Interference and Improper Disclosure of Sensitive Governmental Information	Jan 20, 2025	Jan 29, 2025	90 FR 8343	2025-01954		
7	14153^{[ws]}	Unleashing Alaska's Extraordinary Resource Potential	Jan 20, 2025	Jan 29, 2025	90 FR 8347	2025-01955		
8	14154^{[ws]}	Unleashing American Energy	Jan 20, 2025	Jan 29, 2025	90 FR 8353	2025-01956		
9	14155^{[ws]}	Withdrawing the United States from the World Health Organization	Jan 20, 2025	Jan 29, 2025	90 FR 8361	2025-01957		
10	14156^{[ws]}	Declaring a National Energy Emergency	Jan 20, 2025	Jan 29, 2025	90 FR 8433	2025-02003		
11	14157^{[ws]}	Designating Cartels and Other Organizations as Foreign Terrorist Organizations and Specially Designated Global Terrorists	Jan 20, 2025	Jan 29, 2025	90 FR 8439	2025-02004		
12	14158^{[ws]}	Establishing and Implementing the President's "Department of Government Efficiency"	Jan 20, 2025	Jan 29, 2025	90 FR 8441	2025-02005		
13	14159^{[ws]}	Protecting the American People Against Invasion	Jan 20, 2025	Jan 29, 2025	90 FR 8443	2025-02006		Sanctuary cities; cut funding to organizations helping illegal immigrants
14	14160^{[ws]}	Protecting the Meaning and Value of American Citizenship	Jan 20, 2025	Jan 29, 2025	90 FR 8449	2025-02007		To end birthright citizenship; blocked in court
15	14161^{[ws]}	Protecting the United States From Foreign Terrorists and Other National Security and Public Safety Threats	Jan 20, 2025	Jan 30, 2025	90 FR 8451	2025-02009		Reinstates the Trump travel ban, later implemented under Proclamation 10949
16	14162^{[ws]}	Putting America First in International Environmental Agreements	Jan 20, 2025	Jan 30, 2025	90 FR 8455	2025-02010		
17	14163^{[ws]}	Realigning the United States Refugee Admissions Program	Jan 20, 2025	Jan 30, 2025	90 FR 8459	2025-02011		Partly blocked in court
18	14164^{[ws]}	Restoring the Death Penalty and Protecting Public Safety	Jan 20, 2025	Jan 30, 2025	90 FR 8463	2025-02012		
19	14165^{[ws]}	Securing Our Borders	Jan 20, 2025	Jan 30, 2025	90 FR 8467	2025-02015		
20	14166^{[ws]}	Application of Protecting Americans from Foreign Adversary Controlled Applications Act to TikTok	Jan 20, 2025	Jan 30, 2025	90 FR 8611	2025-02087		
21	14167^{[ws]}	Clarifying the Military's Role in Protecting the Territorial Integrity of the United States	Jan 20, 2025	Jan 30, 2025	90 FR 8613	2025-02089		
22	14168^{[ws]}	Defending Women from Gender Ideology Extremism and Restoring Biological Truth to the Federal Government	Jan 20, 2025	Jan 30, 2025	90 FR 8615	2025-02090		Transgender; blocked in court
23	14169^{[ws]}	Reevaluating and Realigning United States Foreign Aid	Jan 20, 2025	Jan 30, 2025	90 FR 8619	2025-02091		Partly blocked by Supreme Court
24	14170^{[ws]}	Reforming the Federal Hiring Process and Restoring Merit to Government Service	Jan 20, 2025	Jan 30, 2025	90 FR 8621	2025-02094		
25	14171^{[ws]}	Restoring Accountability to Policy-Influencing Positions Within the Federal Workforce	Jan 20, 2025	Jan 31, 2025	90 FR 8625	2025-02095		
26	14172^{[ws]}	Restoring Names That Honor American Greatness	Jan 20, 2025	Jan 31, 2025	90 FR 8629	2025-02096		
27	14173^{[ws]}	Ending Illegal Discrimination and Restoring Merit-Based Opportunity	Jan 21, 2025	Jan 31, 2025	90 FR 8633	2025-02097		Ending DEI; partly blocked in court
28	14174^{[ws]}	Revocation of Certain Executive Orders	Jan 21, 2025	Jan 31, 2025	90 FR 8637	2025-02098		
29	14175^{[ws]}	Designation of Ansar Allah as a Foreign Terrorist Organization	Jan 22, 2025	Jan 31, 2025	90 FR 8639	2025-02103		
30	14176^{[ws]}	Declassification of Records Concerning the Assassinations of President John F. Kennedy, Senator Robert F. Kennedy, and the Reverend Dr. Martin Luther King, Jr.	Jan 23, 2025	Jan 31, 2025	90 FR 8641	2025-02116		
31	14177^{[ws]}	President's Council of Advisors on Science and Technology	Jan 23, 2025	Jan 31, 2025	90 FR 8643	2025-02121		
32	14178^{[ws]}	Strengthening American Leadership in Digital Financial Technology	Jan 23, 2025	Jan 31, 2025	90 FR 8647	2025-02123		
33	14179^{[ws]}	Removing Barriers to American Leadership in Artificial Intelligence	Jan 23, 2025	Jan 31, 2025	90 FR 8741	2025-02172		
34	14180^{[ws]}	Council to Assess the Federal Emergency Management Agency	Jan 24, 2025	Jan 31, 2025	90 FR 8743	2025-02173		
35	14181^{[ws]}	Emergency Measures to Provide Water Resources in California and Improve Disaster Response in Certain Areas	Jan 24, 2025	Jan 31, 2025	90 FR 8747	2025-02174		
36	14182^{[ws]}	Enforcing the Hyde Amendment	Jan 24, 2025	Jan 31, 2025	90 FR 8751	2025-02175		
37	14183^{[ws]}	Prioritizing Military Excellence and Readiness	Jan 27, 2025	Feb 3, 2025	90 FR 8757	2025-02178		Transgender; blocked in court
38	14184^{[ws]}	Reinstating Service Members Discharged Under the Military's COVID-19 Vaccination Mandate	Jan 27, 2025	Feb 3, 2025	90 FR 8761	2025-02180		
39	14185^{[ws]}	Restoring America's Fighting Force	Jan 27, 2025	Feb 3, 2025	90 FR 8763	2025-02181		
40	14186^{[ws]}	The Iron Dome for America	Jan 27, 2025	Feb 3, 2025	90 FR 8767	2025-02182		
41	14187^{[ws]}	Protecting Children from Chemical and Surgical Mutilation	Jan 28, 2025	Feb 3, 2025	90 FR 8771	2025-02194		Transgender; blocked in court
42	14188^{[ws]}	Additional Measures to Combat Anti-Semitism	Jan 29, 2025	Feb 3, 2025	90 FR 8847	2025-02230		
43	14189^{[ws]}	Celebrating America's 250th Birthday	Jan 29, 2025	Feb 3, 2025	90 FR 8849	2025-02231		
44	14190^{[ws]}	Ending Radical Indoctrination in K–12 Schooling	Jan 29, 2025	Feb 3, 2025	90 FR 8853	2025-02232		Ending DEI in K–12 schools
45	14191^{[ws]}	Expanding Educational Freedom and Opportunity for Families	Jan 29, 2025	Feb 3, 2025	90 FR 8859	2025-02233		Funding faith-based and charter schools
46	14192^{[ws]}	Unleashing Prosperity Through Deregulation	Jan 31, 2025	Feb 6, 2025	90 FR 9065	2025-02345		
47	14193^{[ws]}	Imposing Duties To Address the Flow of Illicit Drugs Across Our Northern Border	Feb 1, 2025	Feb 7, 2025	90 FR 9113	2025-02406		Blocked in court
48	14194^{[ws]}	Imposing Duties To Address the Situation at Our Southern Border	Feb 1, 2025	Feb 7, 2025	90 FR 9117	2025-02407		Blocked in court
49	14195^{[ws]}	Imposing Duties To Address the Synthetic Opioid Supply Chain in the People's Republic of China	Feb 1, 2025	Feb 7, 2025	90 FR 9121	2025-02408		Blocked in court
50	14196^{[ws]}	A Plan for Establishing a United States Sovereign Wealth Fund	Feb 3, 2025	Feb 10, 2025	90 FR 9181	2025-02477		
51	14197^{[ws]}	Progress on the Situation at Our Northern Border	Feb 3, 2025	Feb 10, 2025	90 FR 9183	2025-02478		Blocked in court
52	14198^{[ws]}	Progress on the Situation at Our Southern Border	Feb 3, 2025	Feb 10, 2025	90 FR 9185	2025-02479		Blocked in court
53	14199^{[ws]}	Withdrawing the United States from and Ending Funding to Certain United Nations Organizations and Reviewing United States Support to All International Organizations	Feb 4, 2025	Feb 10, 2025	90 FR 9275	2025-02504		
54	14200^{[ws]}	Amendment to Duties Addressing the Synthetic Opioid Supply Chain in the People's Republic of China	Feb 5, 2025	Feb 11, 2025	90 FR 9277	2025-02512		Blocked in court
55	14201^{[ws]}	Keeping Men Out of Women's Sports	Feb 5, 2025	Feb 11, 2025	90 FR 9279	2025-02513		
56	14202^{[ws]}	Eradicating Anti-Christian Bias	Feb 6, 2025	Feb 12, 2025	90 FR 9365	2025-02611		
57	14203^{[ws]}	Imposing Sanctions on the International Criminal Court	Feb 6, 2025	Feb 12, 2025	90 FR 9369	2025-02612		
58	14204^{[ws]}	Addressing Egregious Actions of The Republic of South Africa	Feb 7, 2025	Feb 12, 2025	90 FR 9497	2025-02630		
59	14205^{[ws]}	Establishment of The White House Faith Office	Feb 7, 2025	Feb 12, 2025	90 FR 9499	2025-02635		
60	14206^{[ws]}	Protecting Second Amendment Rights	Feb 7, 2025	Feb 12, 2025	90 FR 9503	2025-02636		
61	14207^{[ws]}	Eliminating the Federal Executive Institute	Feb 10, 2025	Feb 14, 2025	90 FR 9583	2025-02734		
62	14208^{[ws]}	Ending Procurement and Forced Use of Paper Straws	Feb 10, 2025	Feb 14, 2025	90 FR 9585	2025-02735		
63	14209^{[ws]}	Pausing Foreign Corrupt Practices Act Enforcement to Further American Economic and National Security	Feb 10, 2025	Feb 14, 2025	90 FR 9587	2025-02736		
64	14210^{[ws]}	Implementing The President's "Department of Government Efficiency" Workforce Optimization Initiative	Feb 11, 2025	Feb 14, 2025	90 FR 9669	2025-02762		Terminate probationary employees; court granted restraining order
65	14211^{[ws]}	One Voice for America's Foreign Relations	Feb 12, 2025	Feb 15, 2025	90 FR 9831	2025-02841		State Department reform
66	14212^{[ws]}	Establishing the President's Make America Healthy Again Commission	Feb 13, 2025	Feb 19, 2025	90 FR 9833	2025-02871		
67	14213^{[ws]}	Establishing the National Energy Dominance Council	Feb 14, 2025	Feb 20, 2025	90 FR 9945	2025-02928		
68	14214^{[ws]}	Keeping Education Accessible and Ending COVID-19 Vaccine Mandates in Schools	Feb 15, 2025	Feb 20, 2025	90 FR 9949	2025-02931		
69	14215^{[ws]}	Ensuring Accountability for All Agencies	Feb 18, 2025	Feb 22, 2025	90 FR 10447	2025-03063		
70	14216^{[ws]}	Expanding Access to In Vitro Fertilization	Feb 18, 2025	Feb 22, 2025	90 FR 10451	2025-03064		
71	14217^{[ws]}	Commencing the Reduction of the Federal Bureaucracy	Feb 19, 2025	Feb 25, 2025	90 FR 10577	2025-03133		
72	14218^{[ws]}	Ending Taxpayer Subsidization of Open Borders	Feb 19, 2025	Feb 25, 2025	90 FR 10581	2025-03137		
73	14219^{[ws]}	Ensuring Lawful Governance and Implementing the President's "Department of Government Efficiency" Regulatory Initiative	Feb 19, 2025	Feb 25, 2025	90 FR 10583	2025-03138		
74	14220^{[ws]}	Addressing the Threat to National Security from Imports of Copper	Feb 25, 2025	Feb 28, 2025	90 FR 11001	2025-03439		
75	14221^{[ws]}	Making America Healthy Again by Empowering Patients with Clear, Accurate, and Actionable Healthcare Pricing Information	Feb 25, 2025	Feb 28, 2025	90 FR 11005	2025-03440		
76	14222^{[ws]}	Implementing the President's "Department of Government Efficiency" Cost Efficiency Initiative	Feb 26, 2025	Mar 3, 2025	90 FR 11095	2025-03527		
77	14223^{[ws]}	Addressing the Threat to National Security from Imports of Timber, Lumber	Mar 1, 2025	Mar 6, 2025	90 FR 11359	2025-03693		
78	14224^{[ws]}	Designating English as the Official Language of the United States	Mar 1, 2025	Mar 6, 2025	90 FR 11363	2025-03694		
79	14225^{[ws]}	Immediate Expansion of American Timber Production	Mar 1, 2025	Mar 6, 2025	90 FR 11365	2025-03695		
80	14226^{[ws]}	Amendment to Duties to Address the Flow of Illicit Drugs across Our Northern Border	Mar 2, 2025	Mar 6, 2025	90 FR 11369	2025-03728		Blocked in court
81	14227^{[ws]}	Amendment to Duties to Address the Situation at Our Southern Border	Mar 2, 2025	Mar 6, 2025	90 FR 11371	2025-03729		Blocked in court
82	14228^{[ws]}	Further Amendment to Duties Addressing the Synthetic Opioid Supply Chain in the People's Republic of China	Mar 3, 2025	Mar 7, 2025	90 FR 11463	2025-03775		Blocked in court
83	14229^{[ws]}	Honoring Jocelyn Nungaray	Mar 4, 2025	Mar 9, 2025	90 FR 11585	2025-03869		
84	14230^{[ws]}	Addressing Risks from Perkins Coie LLP	Mar 6, 2025	Mar 11, 2025	90 FR 11781	2025-03989		Blocked in court
85	14231^{[ws]}	Amendment to Duties to Address the Flow of Illicit Drugs Across Our Northern Border	Mar 6, 2025	Mar 11, 2025	90 FR 11785	2025-03990		Blocked in court
86	14232^{[ws]}	Amendment to Duties to Address the Flow of Illicit Drugs Across Our Southern Border	Mar 6, 2025	Mar 11, 2025	90 FR 11787	2025-03991		Blocked in court
87	14233^{[ws]}	Establishment of the Strategic Bitcoin Reserve and United States Digital Asset Stockpile	Mar 6, 2025	Mar 11, 2025	90 FR 11789	2025-03992		
88	14234^{[ws]}	Establishing The White House Task Force on the FIFA World Cup 2026	Mar 7, 2025	Mar 12, 2025	90 FR 11883	2025-04102		
89	14235^{[ws]}	Restoring Public Service Loan Forgiveness	Mar 7, 2025	Mar 12, 2025	90 FR 11885	2025-04103		
90	14236^{[ws]}	Additional Rescissions of Harmful Executive Orders and Actions	Mar 14, 2025	Mar 20, 2025	90 FR 13037	2025-04866		
91	14237^{[ws]}	Addressing Risks from Paul Weiss	Mar 14, 2025	Mar 20, 2025	90 FR 13039	2025-04867		Revoked by EO 14244 in exchange for $40 million in legal services
92	14238^{[ws]}	Continuing the Reduction of the Federal Bureaucracy	Mar 14, 2025	Mar 20, 2025	90 FR 13043	2025-04868		Partly blocked by court
93	14239^{[ws]}	Achieving Efficiency Through State and Local Preparedness	Mar 18, 2025	Mar 21, 2025	90 FR 13267	2025-04973		
94	14240^{[ws]}	Eliminating Waste and Saving Taxpayer Dollars by Consolidating Procurement	Mar 20, 2025	Mar 25, 2025	90 FR 13671	2025-05197		
95	14241^{[ws]}	Immediate Measures to Increase American Mineral Production	Mar 20, 2025	Mar 25, 2025	90 FR 13673	2025-05212		Amended by EO 14261 of April 8, 2025
96	14242^{[ws]}	Improving Education Outcomes by Empowering Parents, States, and Communities	Mar 20, 2025	Mar 25, 2025	90 FR 13679	2025-05213		Blocked in court
97	14243^{[ws]}	Stopping Waste, Fraud, and Abuse by Eliminating Information Silos	Mar 20, 2025	Mar 25, 2025	90 FR 13681	2025-05214		
98	14244^{[ws]}	Addressing Remedial Action by Paul Weiss	Mar 21, 2025	Mar 26, 2025	90 FR 13685	2025-05291		
99	14245^{[ws]}	Imposing Tariffs on Countries Importing Venezuelan Oil	Mar 24, 2025	Mar 27, 2025	90 FR 13829	2025-05440		Blocked in court
100	14246^{[ws]}	Addressing Risks from Jenner & Block	Mar 25, 2025	Mar 28, 2025	90 FR 13997	2025-05519		Blocked in court
101	14247^{[ws]}	Modernizing Payments To and From America's Bank Account	Mar 25, 2025	Mar 28, 2025	90 FR 14001	2025-05522		
102	14248^{[ws]}	Preserving and Protecting the Integrity of American Elections	Mar 25, 2025	Mar 28, 2025	90 FR 14005	2025-05523		Blocked in court
103	14249^{[ws]}	Protecting America's Bank Account Against Fraud, Waste, and Abuse	Mar 25, 2025	Mar 28, 2025	90 FR 14011	2025-05524		
104	14250^{[ws]}	Addressing Risks From WilmerHale	Mar 27, 2025	Apr 3, 2025	90 FR 14549	2025-05845		Blocked in court
105	14251^{[ws]}	Exclusions from Federal Labor-Management Relations Programs	Mar 27, 2025	Apr 3, 2025	90 FR 14553	2025-05836		
106	14252^{[ws]}	Making the District of Columbia Safe and Beautiful	Mar 27, 2025	Apr 3, 2025	90 FR 14559	2025-05837		
107	14253^{[ws]}	Restoring Truth and Sanity to American History	Mar 27, 2025	Apr 3, 2025	90 FR 14563	2025-05838		
108	14254^{[ws]}	Combating Unfair Practices in the Live Entertainment Market	Mar 31, 2025	Apr 3, 2025	90 FR 14699	2025-05906		
109	14255^{[ws]}	Establishing the United States Investment Accelerator	Mar 31, 2025	Apr 3, 2025	90 FR 14701	2025-05908		
110	14256^{[ws]}	Further Amendment to Duties Addressing the Synthetic Opioid Supply Chain in the People's Republic of China as Applied to Low-Value Imports	Apr 2, 2025	Apr 5, 2025	90 FR 14899	2025-06027		Blocked in court
111	14257^{[ws]}	Regulating Imports with a Reciprocal Tariff to Rectify Trade Practices that Contribute to Large and Persistent Annual United States Goods Trade Deficits	Apr 2, 2025	Apr 5, 2025	90 FR 15041	2025-06063		Blocked in court
112	14258^{[ws]}	Extending the TikTok Enforcement Delay	Apr 4, 2025	Apr 9, 2025	90 FR 15209	2025-06162		
113	14259^{[ws]}	Amendment to Reciprocal Tariffs and Updated Duties as Applied to Low-Value Imports from the People's Republic of China	Apr 8, 2025	Apr 12, 2025	90 FR 15509	2025-06378		Blocked in court
114	14260^{[ws]}	Protecting American Energy From State Overreach	Apr 8, 2025	Apr 12, 2025	90 FR 15513	2025-06379		
115	14261^{[ws]}	Reinvigorating America's Beautiful Clean Coal Industry and Amending Executive Order 14241	Apr 8, 2025	Apr 12, 2025	90 FR 15517	2025-06380		
116	14262^{[ws]}	Strengthening the Reliability and Security of the United States Electric Grid	Apr 8, 2025	Apr 12, 2025	90 FR 15521	2025-06381		
117	14263^{[ws]}	Addressing Risks from Susman Godfrey	Apr 9, 2025	Apr 15, 2025	90 FR 15615	2025-06458		Blocked in court
118	14264^{[ws]}	Maintaining Acceptable Water Pressure in Showerheads	Apr 9, 2025	Apr 15, 2025	90 FR 15619	2025-06459		
119	14265^{[ws]}	Modernizing Defense Acquisitions and Spurring Innovation in the Defense Industrial Base	Apr 9, 2025	Apr 15, 2025	90 FR 15621	2025-06461		
120	14266^{[ws]}	Modifying Reciprocal Tariff Rates to Reflect Trading Partner Retaliation and Alignment	Apr 9, 2025	Apr 15, 2025	90 FR 15625	2025-06462		Blocked in court
121	14267^{[ws]}	Reducing Anti-Competitive Regulatory Barriers	Apr 9, 2025	Apr 15, 2025	90 FR 15629	2025-06463		
122	14268^{[ws]}	Reforming Foreign Defense Sales to Improve Speed and Accountability	Apr 9, 2025	Apr 15, 2025	90 FR 15631	2025-06464		
123	14269^{[ws]}	Restoring America's Maritime Dominance	Apr 9, 2025	Apr 15, 2025	90 FR 15635	2025-06465		
124	14270^{[ws]}	Zero-Based Regulatory Budgeting to Unleash American Energy	Apr 9, 2025	Apr 15, 2025	90 FR 15643	2025-06466		
125	14271^{[ws]}	Ensuring Commercial, Cost-Effective Solutions in Federal Contracts	Apr 15, 2025	Apr 18, 2025	90 FR 16433	2025-06835		
126	14272^{[ws]}	Ensuring National Security and Economic Resilience Through Section 232 Actions on Processed Critical Minerals and Derivative Products	Apr 15, 2025	Apr 18, 2025	90 FR 16437	2025-06836		
127	14273^{[ws]}	Lowering Drug Prices by Once Again Putting Americans First	Apr 15, 2025	Apr 18, 2025	90 FR 16441	2025-06837		
128	14274^{[ws]}	Restoring Common Sense to Federal Office Space Management	Apr 15, 2025	Apr 18, 2025	90 FR 16445	2025-06838		
129	14275^{[ws]}	Restoring Common Sense to Federal Procurement	Apr 15, 2025	Apr 18, 2025	90 FR 16447	2025-06839		
130	14276^{[ws]}	Restoring American Seafood Competitiveness	Apr 17, 2025	Apr 22, 2025	90 FR 16993	2025-07062		
131	14277^{[ws]}	Advancing Artificial Intelligence Education for American Youth	Apr 23, 2025	Apr 26, 2025	90 FR 17519	2025-07368		
132	14278^{[ws]}	Preparing Americans for High-Paying Skilled Trade Jobs of the Future	Apr 23, 2025	Apr 26, 2025	90 FR 17525	2025-07369		
133	14279^{[ws]}	Reforming Accreditation to Strengthen Higher Education	Apr 23, 2025	Apr 26, 2025	90 FR 17529	2025-07376		
134	14280^{[ws]}	Reinstating Commonsense School Discipline Policies	Apr 23, 2025	Apr 26, 2025	90 FR 17533	2025-07377		
135	14281^{[ws]}	Restoring Equality of Opportunity and Meritocracy	Apr 23, 2025	Apr 26, 2025	90 FR 17537	2025-07378		Civil Rights Act of 1964, Fair Housing Act
136	14282^{[ws]}	Transparency Regarding Foreign Influence at American Universities	Apr 23, 2025	Apr 26, 2025	90 FR 17541	2025-07379		
137	14283^{[ws]}	White House Initiative to Promote Excellence and Innovation at Historically Black Colleges and Universities	Apr 23, 2025	Apr 26, 2025	90 FR 17543	2025-07380		
138	14284^{[ws]}	Strengthening Probationary Periods in the Federal Service	Apr 24, 2025	Apr 29, 2025	90 FR 17729	2025-07469		
139	14285^{[ws]}	Unleashing America's Offshore Critical Minerals and Resources	Apr 24, 2025	Apr 29, 2025	90 FR 17735	2025-07470		
140	14286^{[ws]}	Enforcing Commonsense Rules of the Road for America's Truck Drivers	Apr 28, 2025	May 2, 2025	90 FR 18759	2025-07786		
141	14287^{[ws]}	Protecting American Communities from Criminal Aliens	Apr 28, 2025	May 2, 2025	90 FR 18761	2025-07789		
142	14288^{[ws]}	Strengthening and Unleashing America's Law Enforcement to Pursue Criminals and Protect Innocent Citizens	Apr 28, 2025	May 2, 2025	90 FR 18765	2025-07790		
143	14289^{[ws]}	Addressing Certain Tariffs on Importing Articles	Apr 29, 2025	May 2, 2025	90 FR 18907	2025-07835		Blocked in court
144	14290^{[ws]}	Ending Taxpayer Subsidization of Biased Media	May 1, 2025	May 7, 2025	90 FR 19415	2025-08133		Permanently blocked in court
145	14291^{[ws]}	Establishment of the Religious Liberty Commission	May 1, 2025	May 7, 2025	90 FR 19417	2025-08134		
146	14292^{[ws]}	Improving the Safety and Security of Biological Research	May 5, 2025	May 8, 2025	90 FR 19611	2025-08266		
147	14293^{[ws]}	Regulatory Relief to Promote Domestic Production of Critical Medicines	May 5, 2025	May 8, 2025	90 FR 19615	2025-08267		
148	14294^{[ws]}	Fighting Overcriminalization in Federal Regulations	May 9, 2025	May 14, 2025	90 FR 20363	2025-08681		
149	14295^{[ws]}	Increasing Efficiency At the Office of the Federal Register	May 9, 2025	May 14, 2025	90 FR 20367	2025-08682		
150	14296^{[ws]}	Keeping Promises to Veterans and Establishing a National Center for Warrior Independence	May 9, 2025	May 14, 2025	90 FR 20369	2025-08683		
151	14297^{[ws]}	Delivering Most-Favored-Nation Prescription Drug Pricing to American Patients	May 12, 2025	May 15, 2025	90 FR 20749	2025-08876		
152	14298^{[ws]}	Modifying Reciprocal Tariff Rates to Reflect Discussions with the People's Republic of China	May 12, 2025	May 21, 2025	90 FR 21831	2025-09297		Blocked in court
153	14299^{[ws]}	Deploying Advanced Nuclear Reactor Technologies for National Security	May 23, 2025	May 29, 2025	90 FR 22581	2025-09796		
154	14300^{[ws]}	Ordering the Reform of the Nuclear Regulatory Commission	May 23, 2025	May 29, 2025	90 FR 22587	2025-09798		
155	14301^{[ws]}	Reforming Nuclear Reactor Testing at the Department of Energy	May 23, 2025	May 29, 2025	90 FR 22591	2025-09799		
156	14302^{[ws]}	Reinvigorating the Nuclear Industrial Base	May 23, 2025	May 29, 2025	90 FR 22595	2025-09801		
157	14303^{[ws]}	Restoring Gold Standard Science	May 23, 2025	May 29, 2025	90 FR 22601	2025-09802		
158	14304^{[ws]}	Leading the World in Supersonic Flight	Jun 6, 2025	Jun 11, 2025	90 FR 24717	2025-10800		
159	14305^{[ws]}	Restoring American Airspace Sovereignty	Jun 6, 2025	Jun 11, 2025	90 FR 24719	2025-10803		
160	14306^{[ws]}	Sustaining Select Efforts to Strengthen the Nation's Cybersecurity and Amending Executive Order 13694 and Executive Order 14144	Jun 6, 2025	Jun 11, 2025	90 FR 24723	2025-10804		
161	14307^{[ws]}	Unleashing American Drone Dominance	Jun 6, 2025	Jun 11, 2025	90 FR 24727	2025-10814		
162	14308^{[ws]}	Empowering Commonsense Wildfire Prevention and Response	Jun 12, 2025	Jun 18, 2025	90 FR 26175	2025-11358		
163	14309^{[ws]}	Implementing the General Terms of the United States of America–United Kingdom Economic Prosperity Deal	Jun 16, 2025	Jun 23, 2025	90 FR 26419	2025-11473		
164	14310^{[ws]}	Further Extending the TikTok Enforcement Delay	Jun 19, 2025	Jun 24, 2025	90 FR 26913	2025-11682		
165	14311^{[ws]}	Establishing a White House Office for Special Peace Missions	Jun 30, 2025	Jul 3, 2025	90 FR 29393	2025-12505		
166	14312^{[ws]}	Providing for the Revocation of Syria Sanctions	Jun 30, 2025	Jul 3, 2025	90 FR 29395	2025-12506		
167	14313^{[ws]}	Establishing the President's Make America Beautiful Again Commission	Jul 3, 2025	Jul 9, 2025	90 FR 30197	2025-12774		
168	14314^{[ws]}	Making America Beautiful Again by Improving Our National Parks	Jul 3, 2025	Jul 9, 2025	90 FR 30201	2025-12775		
169	14315^{[ws]}	Ending Market Distorting Subsidies for Unreliable, Foreign‑Controlled Energy Sources	Jul 7, 2025	Jul 10, 2025	90 FR 30821	2025-12961		
170	14316^{[ws]}	Extending the Modification of the Reciprocal Tariff Rates	Jul 7, 2025	Jul 10, 2025	90 FR 30823	2025-12962		
171	14317^{[ws]}	Creating Schedule G in the Excepted Service	Jul 17, 2025	Jul 23, 2025	90 FR 34753	2025-13925		
172	14318^{[ws]}	Accelerating Federal Permitting of Data Center Infrastructure	Jul 23, 2025	Jul 28, 2025	90 FR 35385	2025-14212		
173	14319^{[ws]}	Preventing Woke AI in the Federal Government	Jul 23, 2025	Jul 28, 2025	90 FR 35389	2025-14217		
174	14320^{[ws]}	Promoting the Export of the American AI Technology Stack	Jul 23, 2025	Jul 28, 2025	90 FR 35393	2025-14218		
175	14321^{[ws]}	Ending Crime and Disorder on America's Streets	Jul 24, 2025	Jul 29, 2025	90 FR 35817	2025-14391		
176	14322^{[ws]}	Saving College Sports	Jul 24, 2025	Jul 29, 2025	90 FR 35821	2025-14392		
177	14323^{[ws]}	Addressing Threats to The United States by the Government of Brazil	Jul 30, 2025	Aug 5, 2025	90 FR 37739	2025-14896		
178	14324^{[ws]}	Suspending Duty-Free De Minimis Treatment for All Countries	Jul 30, 2025	Aug 5, 2025	90 FR 37775	2025-14897		
179	14325^{[ws]}	Amendment to Duties To Address the Flow of Illicit Drugs Across Our Northern Border	Jul 31, 2025	Aug 6, 2025	90 FR 37957	2025-14999		
180	14326^{[ws]}	Further Modifying the Reciprocal Tariff Rates	Jul 31, 2025	Aug 6, 2025	90 FR 37963	2025-15010		
181	14327^{[ws]}	President's Council on Sports, Fitness, and Nutrition, and the Reestablishment of the Presidential Fitness Test	Jul 31, 2025	Aug 6, 2025	90 FR 37993	2025-15011		
182	14328^{[ws]}	Establishing the White House Task Force on the 2028 Summer Olympics	Aug 5, 2025	Aug 8, 2025	90 FR 38597	2025-15193		
183	14329^{[ws]}	Addressing Threats to the United States by the Government of the Russian Federation	Aug 6, 2025	Aug 11, 2025	90 FR 38701	2025-15267		
184	14330^{[ws]}	Democratizing Access to Alternative Assets for 401(k) Investors	Aug 7, 2025	Aug 12, 2025	90 FR 38921	2025-15340		
185	14331^{[ws]}	Guaranteeing Fair Banking for All Americans	Aug 7, 2025	Aug 12, 2025	90 FR 38925	2025-15341		
186	14332^{[ws]}	Improving Oversight of Federal Grantmaking	Aug 7, 2025	Aug 12, 2025	90 FR 38929	2025-15344		
187	14333^{[ws]}	Declaring a Crime Emergency in the District of Columbia	Aug 11, 2025	Aug 14, 2025	90 FR 39301	2025-15550		
188	14334^{[ws]}	Further Modifying Reciprocal Tariff Rates to Reflect Ongoing Discussions with The People's Republic of China	Aug 11, 2025	Aug 14, 2025	90 FR 39305	2025-15554		
189	14335^{[ws]}	Enabling Competition in the Commercial Space Industry	Aug 13, 2025	Aug 19, 2025	90 FR 40219	2025-15822		
190	14336^{[ws]}	Ensuring American Pharmaceutical Supply Chain Resilience by Filling the Strategic Active Pharmaceutical Ingredients Reserve	Aug 13, 2025	Aug 19, 2025	90 FR 40223	2025-15823		
191	14337^{[ws]}	Revocation of Executive Order on Competition	Aug 13, 2025	Aug 19, 2025	90 FR 40227	2025-15824		
192	14338^{[ws]}	Improving Our Nation Through Better Design	Aug 21, 2025	Aug 26, 2025	90 FR 41759	2025-16396		
193	14339^{[ws]}	Additional Measures to Address the Crime Emergency in the District of Columbia	Aug 25, 2025	Aug 28, 2025	90 FR 42121	2025-16614		
194	14340^{[ws]}	Measures To End Cashless Bail and Enforce the Law in the District of Columbia	Aug 25, 2025	Aug 28, 2025	90 FR 42125	2025-16615		
195	14341^{[ws]}	Prosecuting Burning of the American Flag	Aug 25, 2025	Aug 28, 2025	90 FR 42127	2025-16616		
196	14342^{[ws]}	Taking Steps To End Cashless Bail To Protect Americans	Aug 25, 2025	Aug 28, 2025	90 FR 42129	2025-16618		
197	14343^{[ws]}	Further Exclusions from the Federal Labor-Management Relations Program	Aug 28, 2025	Sep 3, 2025	90 FR 42683	2025-16924		
198	14344^{[ws]}	Making Federal Architecture Beautiful Again	Aug 28, 2025	Sep 3, 2025	90 FR 42685	2025-16928		
199	14345^{[ws]}	Implementing the United States–Japan Agreement	Sep 4, 2025	Sep 9, 2025	90 FR 43535	2025-17389		
200	14346^{[ws]}	Modifying the Scope of Reciprocal Tariffs and Establishing Procedures for Implementing Trade and Security Agreements	Sep 5, 2025	Sep 10, 2025	90 FR 43737	2025-17507		
201	14347^{[ws]}	Restoring the United States Department of War	Sep 5, 2025	Sep 10, 2025	90 FR 43893	2025-17508		
202	14348^{[ws]}	Strengthening Efforts to Protect U.S. Nationals from Wrongful Detention Abroad	Sep 5, 2025	Sep 10, 2025	90 FR 43895	2025-17509		
203	14349^{[ws]}	Establishing An Emergency Board to Investigate Disputes Between the Long Island Rail Road Company and Certain of its Employees Represented by Certain Labor Organizations	Sep 16, 2025	Sep 23, 2025	90 FR 45901	2025-18479		
204	14350^{[ws]}	Further Extending the TikTok Enforcement Delay	Sep 16, 2025	Sep 23, 2025	90 FR 45903	2025-18482		
205	14351^{[ws]}	The Gold Card	Sep 19, 2025	Sep 24, 2025	90 FR 46031	2025-18602		Implements the Trump Gold Card
206	14352^{[ws]}	Saving TikTok While Protecting National Security	Sep 25, 2025	Sep 30, 2025	90 FR 47219	2025-19139		
207	14353^{[ws]}	Assuring the Security of the State of Qatar	Sep 29, 2025	Oct 6, 2025	90 FR 48143	2025-19483		
208	14354^{[ws]}	Continuance of Certain Federal Advisory Committees	Sep 29, 2025	Oct 6, 2025	90 FR 48145	2025-19485		
209	14355^{[ws]}	Unlocking Cures for Pediatric Cancer with Artificial Intelligence	Sep 30, 2025	Oct 7, 2025	90 FR 48153	2025-19495		
210	14356^{[ws]}	Ensuring Continued Accountability in Federal Hiring	Oct 15, 2025	Oct 20, 2025	90 FR 48387	2025-19614		
211	14357^{[ws]}	Modifying Duties Addressing the Synthetic Opioid Supply Chain in the People's Republic of China	Nov 4, 2025	Nov 7, 2025	90 FR 50725	2025-19825		
212	14358^{[ws]}	Modifying Reciprocal Tariff Rates Consistent with the Economic and Trade Arrangement Between the United States and the People's Republic of China	Nov 4, 2025	Nov 7, 2025	90 FR 50729	2025-19826		
213	14359^{[ws]}	Fostering the Future for American Children and Families	Nov 13, 2025	Nov 19, 2025	90 FR 52227	2025-20406		
214	14360^{[ws]}	Modifying the Scope of the Reciprocal Tariff with Respect to Certain Agricultural Products	Nov 14, 2025	Nov 25, 2025	90 FR 54091	2025-21203		
215	14361^{[ws]}	Modifying the Scope of Tariffs on the Government of Brazil	Nov 20, 2025	Nov 26, 2025	90 FR 54467	2025-21417		
216	14362^{[ws]}	Designation of Certain Muslim Brotherhood Chapters as Foreign Terrorist Organizations and Specially Designated Global Terrorists	Nov 24, 2025	Nov 28, 2025	90 FR 55033	2025-21664		
217	14363^{[ws]}	Launching the Genesis Mission	Nov 24, 2025	Nov 28, 2025	90 FR 55035	2025-21665		
218	14364^{[ws]}	Addressing Security Risks from Price Fixing and Anti-Competitive Behavior in the Food Supply Chain	Dec 6, 2025	Dec 10, 2025	90 FR 57349	2025-22537		
219	14365^{[ws]}	Ensuring a National Policy Framework for Artificial Intelligence	Dec 11, 2025	Dec 16, 2025	90 FR 58499	2025-23092		
220	14366^{[ws]}	Protecting American Investors from Foreign-Owned and Politically-Motivated Proxy Advisors	Dec 11, 2025	Dec 16, 2025	90 FR 58503	2025-23093		
221	14367^{[ws]}	Designating Fentanyl as a Weapon of Mass Destruction	Dec 15, 2025	Dec 18, 2025	90 FR 59365	2025-23417		
222	14368^{[ws]}	Adjustments of Certain Rates of Pay	Dec 18, 2025	Dec 23, 2025	90 FR 60521	2025-23844		
223	14369^{[ws]}	Ensuring American Space Superiority	Dec 18, 2025	Dec 23, 2025	90 FR 60537	2025-23845		
224	14370^{[ws]}	Increasing Medical Marijuana and Cannabidiol Research	Dec 18, 2025	Dec 23, 2025	90 FR 60541	2025-23846		
225	14371^{[ws]}	Providing for the Closing of Executive Departments and Agencies of the Federal Government on December 24, 2025, and December 26, 2025	Dec 18, 2025	Dec 23, 2025	90 FR 60545	2025-23847		

== 2026 ==
Relative EO #	Absolute EO #	Title	Date signed	Date published	Federal Register citation	Federal Register doc. #	Full text	Notes
226	14372^{[ws]}	Prioritizing the Warfighter in Defense Contracting	Jan 7, 2026	Jan 13, 2026	91 FR 1377	2026-00554		
227	14373^{[ws]}	Safeguarding Venezuelan Oil Revenue for the Good of the American and Venezuelan People	Jan 9, 2026	Jan 15, 2026	91 FR 2045	2026-00831		
228	14374^{[ws]}	Establishing a Second Emergency Board To Investigate Disputes Between the Long Island Rail Road Company and Certain of Its Employees Represented by Certain Labor Organizations	Jan 14, 2026	Jan 20, 2026	91 FR 2457	2026-01061		
229	14375^{[ws]}	Designating the Board of Peace as a Public International Organization Entitled To Enjoy Certain Privileges, Exemptions, and Immunities	Jan 16, 2026	Jan 22, 2026	91 FR 2837	2026-01271		
230	14376^{[ws]}	Stopping Wall Street from Competing with Main Street Homebuyers	Jan 20, 2026	Jan 23, 2026	91 FR 3023	2026-01424		
231	14377^{[ws]}	Addressing State and Local Failures to Rebuild Los Angeles After Wildfire Disasters	Jan 23, 2026	Jan 29, 2026	91 FR 3989	2026-01871		
232	14378^{[ws]}	Continuance of the Federal Emergency Management Agency Review Council	Jan 23, 2026	Jan 29, 2026	91 FR 3993	2026-01872		
233	14379^{[ws]}	Addressing Addiction through the Great American Recovery Initiative	Jan 29, 2026	Feb 3, 2026	91 FR 5081	2026-02249		
234	14380^{[ws]}	Addressing Threats to the United States by the Government of Cuba	Jan 29, 2026	Feb 3, 2026	91 FR 5085	2026-02250		
235	14381^{[ws]}	Celebrating American Greatness with American Motor Racing	Jan 30, 2026	Feb 4, 2026	91 FR 5211	2026-02292		
236	14382^{[ws]}	Addressing Threats to the United States by the Government of Iran	Feb 6, 2026	Feb 11, 2026	91 FR 6493	2026-02813		
237	14383^{[ws]}	Establishing an America First Arms Transfer Strategy	Feb 6, 2026	Feb 11, 2026	91 FR 6497	2026-02814		
238	14384^{[ws]}	Modifying Duties To Address Threats to the United States by the Government of the Russian Federation	Feb 6, 2026	Feb 11, 2026	91 FR 6501	2026-02818		
239	14385^{[ws]}	Protecting the National Security and Welfare of the United States and its Citizens from Criminal Actors and Other Public Safety Threats	Feb 6, 2026	Feb 11, 2026	91 FR 6505	2026-02819		
240	14386^{[ws]}	Strengthening United States National Defense With America's Beautiful Clean Coal Power Generation Fleet	Feb 11, 2026	Feb 17, 2026	91 FR 7393	2026-03156		
241	14387^{[ws]}	Promoting the National Defense by Ensuring an Adequate Supply of Elemental Phosphorus and Glyphosate-Based Herbicides	Feb 18, 2026	Feb 23, 2026	91 FR 8703	2026-03628		
242	14388^{[ws]}	Continuing the Suspension of Duty-Free De Minimis Treatment for All Countries	Feb 20, 2026	Feb 25, 2026	91 FR 9433	2026-03829		
243	14389^{[ws]}	Ending Certain Tariff Actions	Feb 20, 2026	Feb 25, 2026	91 FR 9437	2026-03832		
244	14390^{[ws]}	Combating Cybercrime, Fraud, and Predatory Schemes Against American Citizens	Mar 6, 2026	Mar 11, 2026	91 FR 12051	2026-04826		
245	14391^{[ws]}	Adjusting Certain Delegations Under the Defense Production Act	Mar 13, 2026	Mar 18, 2026	91 FR 13199	2026-05382		
246	14392^{[ws]}	Ensuring Truthful Advertising of Products Claiming to be Made in America	Mar 13, 2026	Mar 18, 2026	91 FR 13201	2026-05383		
247	14393^{[ws]}	Promoting Access to Mortgage Credit	Mar 13, 2026	Mar 18, 2026	91 FR 13203	2026-05384		
248	14394^{[ws]}	Removing Regulatory Barriers to Affordable Home Construction	Mar 13, 2026	Mar 18, 2026	91 FR 13207	2026-05388		
249	14395^{[ws]}	Establishing the Task Force to Eliminate Fraud	Mar 16, 2026	Mar 19, 2026	91 FR 13485	2026-05497		
250	14396^{[ws]}	Preserving America's Game	Mar 20, 2026	Mar 25, 2026	91 FR 14639	2026-05867		
251	14397^{[ws]}	Further Continuance of the Federal Emergency Management Agency Review Council	Mar 24, 2026	Mar 27, 2026	91 FR 15509	2026-06075		
252	14398^{[ws]}	Addressing DEI Discrimination by Federal Contractors	Mar 26, 2026	Mar 31, 2026	91 FR 16147	2026-06286		
253	14399^{[ws]}	Ensuring Citizenship Verification and Integrity in Federal Elections	Mar 31, 2026	Apr 3, 2026	91 FR 17125	2026-06601		
254	14400^{[ws]}	Urgent National Action to Save College Sports	Apr 3, 2026	Apr 9, 2026	91 FR 18267	2026-06961		
255	14401^{[ws]}	Accelerating Medical Treatments for Serious Mental Illness	Apr 18, 2026	Apr 22, 2026	91 FR 21709	2026-07907		
256	14402^{[ws]}	Promoting Efficiency, Accountability, and Performance in Federal Contracting	Apr 30, 2026	May 5, 2026	91 FR 24325	2026-08900		
257	14403^{[ws]}	Promoting Retirement-Savings Access for American Workers by Establishing TrumpIRA.gov	Apr 30, 2026	May 5, 2026	91 FR 24329	2026-08908		
258	14404^{[ws]}	Imposing Sanctions on Those Responsible for Repression in Cuba and for Threats to United States National Security and Foreign Policy	May 1, 2026	May 7, 2026	91 FR 25061	2026-09173		
259	14405^{[ws]}	Integrating Financial Technology Innovation Into Regulatory Frameworks	May 19, 2026	May 22, 2026	91 FR 30475	2026-10399		
260	14406^{[ws]}	Restoring Integrity to America's Financial System	May 19, 2026	May 22, 2026	91 FR 30479	2026-10400		
261	14407^{[ws]}	Realigning United States Core Childhood Vaccination Recommendations With Best Practices from Peer, Developed Countries	May 29, 2026	May 29, 2026	91 FR 33575	2026-10401		
262	14408^{[ws]}	Removing Unnecessary and Counterproductive Restrictions on Access to Federal Lands	May 29, 2026	May 29, 2026	91 FR 33577	2026-11181		
263	14409^{[ws]}	Promoting Advanced Artificial Intelligence Innovation and Security	June 5, 2026	June 5, 2026	91 FR 34565	2026-11415		
264	14410^{[ws]}	Implementing Schedule Policy/Career in the Excepted Service	June 10, 2026	June 10, 2026	91 FR 34893	2026-11594		
265	14411^{[ws]}	Strengthening Customs Enforcement	June 10, 2026	June 10, 2026	91 FR 35125	2026-11595		
266	14412^{[ws]}	Securing the Nation Against Advanced Cryptographic Attacks	June 22, 2026	June 22, 2026	91 FR 38483	2026-12909		
267	14413^{[ws]}	Ushering in the Next Frontier of Quantum Innovation	June 22, 2026	June 22, 2026	91 FR 38487	2026-12910		
268	14414^{[ws]}	Advancing Regenerative Agriculture and Strengthening American Farm Resilience	June 25, 2026	June 25, 2026	91 FR 39841	2026-13254		
269	14415^{[ws]}	Securing America's Defense Supply Chains and Ensuring Domestic Acquisition of Critical Materials	July 20, 2026	July 20, 2026	91 FR 46693	2026-15003		
270	14416^{[ws]}	Restoring Trust in the Smithsonian Institution	July 24, 2026	July 24, 2026	91 FR 47925	2026-15357		
271	14417^{[ws]}	Establishing the President's Military Spouse Commission	August 3, 2026	August 3, 2026	91 FR 51059	2026-16125		
272	14418^{[ws]}	Continuing to Protect the Meaning and Value of American Citizenship	August 6, 2026	August 6, 2026	91 FR 51991	2026-16403		
273	14419^{[ws]}	Ending Birth Tourism	August 6, 2026	August 6, 2026	91 FR 51993	2026-16404		
274	14420^{[ws]}	Delivering Gold Standard Childhood Vaccine Recommendations for Americans	August 10, 2026	August 10, 2026	91 FR 53173	2026-16730		
275	14421^{[ws]}	Declaring a National Emergency to Secure the United States Bulk-Power System	August 26, 2026	August 31, 2026	91 FR 55995	2026-17843		Incorrectly numbered as Executive Order 14420 on the White House website
276	14422^{[ws]}	Honoring the American History of the Great Lakes and Renaming Lake Ontario as Lake America	August 27, 2026	September 2, 2026	91 FR 56543	2026-18020		
277	14423^{[ws]}	Establishing the United States Space Academy	August 28, 2026	September 3, 2026	91 FR 56737	2026-18141		
278	14424^{[ws]}	Promoting Fair Competition In Livestock Markets And Expanding Market Access for American Meat Producers	September 4, 2026	September 10, 2026	91 FR 57761	2026-18567		
279	14425^{[ws]}	Supporting America's Ranchers	September 4, 2026	September 10, 2026	91 FR 57765	2026-18571		
280	14426^{[ws]}	Accelerating Access to Veterans' Benefits and Employment Opportunities	September 8, 2026	September 11, 2026	91 FR 58003	2026-18738		
281	14427^{[ws]}	Adjusting Certain Delegations Under the Defense Production Act	September 8, 2026	September 11, 2026	91 FR 58007	2026-18739		
282	14428^{[ws]}	Providing Meaningful Water Quality Improvements Through Collaboration and Oversight of Federal Support	September 16, 2026	September 21, 2026	91 FR 59975	2026-19335		
283	14429^{[ws]}	Reinvigorating America's Hunting Heritage	September 17, 2026	September 22, 2026	91 FR 60289	2026-19416		
284	14430^{[ws]}	Restoring American Saltwater Angling and Recreation	September 17, 2026	September 22, 2026	91 FR 60293	2026-19417		
285	14431^{[ws]}	Enhancing Program Integrity and Interagency Coordination in the Administration of the H-1B Nonimmigrant Visa Program	September 18, 2026	September 23, 2026	91 FR 60501	2026-19555		
286	14432^{[ws]}	Streamlining Access to Government Services Through America.gov	September 29, 2026	October 2, 2026	91 FR 63121	2026-20319		
287	14433^{[ws]}	Eliminating Disease-Carrying Pests And Restoring Enjoyment Of The Great Outdoors	September 29, 2026	October 2, 2026	91 FR 63125	2026-20320		
288	14434^{[ws]}	Inaugurating The Era Of Super Intelligence	September 29, 2026	October 2, 2026	91 FR 63129	2026-20321		
289	14435^{[ws]}	Emergency Tax Relief on Diesel Fuel	October 5, 2026	October 9, 2026	91 FR 64747	2026-20855		
290	14436^{[ws]}	Implementing the Lindsey O. Graham Sanctioning Russia and Iran Act of 2026	October 16, 2026	October 21, 2026	91 FR 66627	2026-21599		
291	14437^{[ws]}	Advancing Women's Health To Improve Outcomes in All Phases of Life	October 19, 2026	October 22, 2026	91 FR 66779	2026-21666		
292	14438^{[ws]}	Decreasing Housing Costs for the American People	October 22, 2026	October 28, 2026	91 FR 68007	2026-22051		

== See also ==
- Executive order (United States)
- List of executive orders in the first Trump presidency, EO #13765–13984 (2017–2021)
- List of executive actions by Joe Biden, EO #13985–14146 (2021–2025)
- List of executive actions by Donald Trump
- List of bills in the 119th United States Congress
- List of acts of the 119th United States Congress
