= Executive Order 14155 =

2025 order on US withdrawal from the WHO

- "Withdrawing the United States from the World Health Organization"
- Front page of Executive Order 14155
- Type: Executive order
- Number: 14155
- President: Donald Trump
- Signed: January 20, 2025

Federal Register details
- Federal Register document number: 2025-01957
- Publication date: January 20, 2025

Summary
- Orders the withdrawal of the United States from the World Health Organization

Executive Order 14155, titled "Withdrawing the United States from the World Health Organization", is an executive order signed by United States president Donald Trump on January 20, 2025, during the first day of his second presidential term. The order directed the withdrawal of the United States from the World Health Organization (WHO).

This executive order marked the second time the United States had ordered its withdrawal from the WHO.

The United States formally left the WHO on January 22, 2026. Shortly thereafter, the Trump administration proposed to spend $2 billion per year to duplicate the kinds of global disease surveillance systems that it helped build and accessed at a fraction of the cost through its WHO membership.

== Background ==
During the final year of his first presidency and amidst the COVID-19 pandemic, the Trump administration began the process of withdrawing from the World Health Organization (WHO) in July 2020. At that time, Donald Trump was critical of the WHO's handling of the pandemic, arguing that the virus had originated in a laboratory in Wuhan, China, and that the WHO had failed to act on this information. However, in January 2021, President Joe Biden reversed the decision.

== Provisions ==
The executive order stated that the WHO mishandled the COVID-19 pandemic, failed to adopt reforms, and was affected by political interference from member states in 2020. The order then directed the secretary of state to notify the secretary-general of the United Nations and the leadership of the WHO about the United States' withdrawal. It also ordered a pause on future transfers of funds, support, and resources to the WHO, the recall of United States government personnel working with the WHO, and the identification of United States and international partners as alternative venues for activities that are currently undertaken by the WHO.

The order further instructed the director of the White House Office of Pandemic Preparedness and Response Policy to review and replace the 2024 U.S. Global Health Security Strategy. Additionally, the secretary of state was ordered to cease negotiations on the WHO Pandemic Agreement.

== Reactions ==
On January 21, the WHO issued a statement expressing regret over the United States' decision to withdraw, emphasizing the organization's critical role in global health and its long-standing partnership with the United States since 1948. The WHO urged the United States to reconsider its decision, highlighting joint successes such as eradicating smallpox and fighting polio.

On January 24, Politico reported that WHO director-general Tedros Adhanom Ghebreyesus had sent an email to WHO staff stating that the announcement of the United States' withdrawal from the WHO had resulted in the organization implementing significant budget cuts, including a freeze on recruitment, reductions in travel expenditures, meetings being fully virtual "unless in exceptional circumstances" and missions to provide technical support to countries being "limited to the most essential."

The Doctors Without Borders criticized the decision in a statement released on January 23, warning of life-threatening consequences for humanitarian efforts and global health coordination. CEO Avril Benoît stressed the importance of United States' support for WHO-led disease eradication and outbreak prevention.

The O'Neill Institute for National and Global Health Law at Georgetown University expressed concern, describing the decision to withdraw as a setback for global health governance. In their statement, they highlighted the United States' role as a major financial contributor to the WHO and reaffirmed their commitment to international health collaboration.

At a press conference on January 21, the Chinese Ministry of Foreign Affairs spokesperson Guo Jiakun stated that the role of the WHO should be "strengthened rather than weakened". In response to the United States' withdrawal from the WHO, Guo stated that "China will, as always, support WHO in fulfilling its duty, deepen international cooperation in public health, advance global public health governance, and promote the building of a global community of health for all."

== See also ==
- Criticism of the United Nations
- International organization membership of the United States
- List of executive orders in the second presidency of Donald Trump
- United States and the Paris Agreement
- United States and the United Nations
