= Executive Order 14376 =

Executive order

- Long title: Stopping Wall Street from Competing with Main Street Homebuyers

Legislative history
- Signed into law by President Donald Trump on January 20, 2026

Executive Order 14376, titled Stopping Wall Street from Competing with Main Street Homebuyers, is an executive order signed by U.S. President Donald Trump on January 20, 2026. The order directs federal agencies to restrict the acquisition of single-family homes by large institutional investors and prioritise homeownership for individual buyers.

== Background ==
Prior to the order, Trump had indicated plans to restrict Wall Street firms from purchasing single-family homes as part of efforts to reduce housing costs.

The order was issued amid concerns over housing affordability and the growing role of institutional investors in single-family housing markets. It establishes a policy to limit federal support for investor purchases of single-family homes and to prioritise sales to owner-occupants.

It further directs federal agencies to prioritise home sales to individual buyers, restrict federal programs from facilitating investor purchases, and review acquisitions by large institutional investors for anti-competitive practices. The order also directs the Department of Justice and the Federal Trade Commission to increase antitrust scrutiny of large institutional investors in the housing market.

According to Reuters reporting, the measures could increase housing demand without addressing supply constraints, potentially contributing to higher home prices.

== See also ==
- Corporate personhood
- List of executive orders in the second Trump presidency
