= Executive Order 14196 =

US sovereign wealth fund executive order

A Plan for Establishing a United States Sovereign Wealth Fund
- Long title: Executive Order 14196

Citations
- Public law: Executive Order 14196

Legislative history
- Introduced in the Executive branch by President of the United States; Signed into law by President Donald Trump on February 3, 2025

Executive Order 14196, titled A Plan for Establishing a United States Sovereign Wealth Fund, is an executive order signed by U.S. President Donald Trump on February 3, 2025. The order directs the development of a plan for establishing a United States sovereign wealth fund.

== Background ==
The order establishes a policy of expanding federal stewardship of national wealth through the potential creation of a sovereign wealth fund. It directs the Secretary of the Treasury and the Secretary of Commerce to develop a plan outlining funding mechanisms, investment strategies, fund structure, governance, and legal considerations, including any requirement for legislation. The plan is to be submitted within 90 days, although the order provides limited detail on how the fund would be structured or financed.
