= Executive Order 14076 =

2022 US executive order

- Executive Order on Protecting Access to Reproductive Healthcare Services

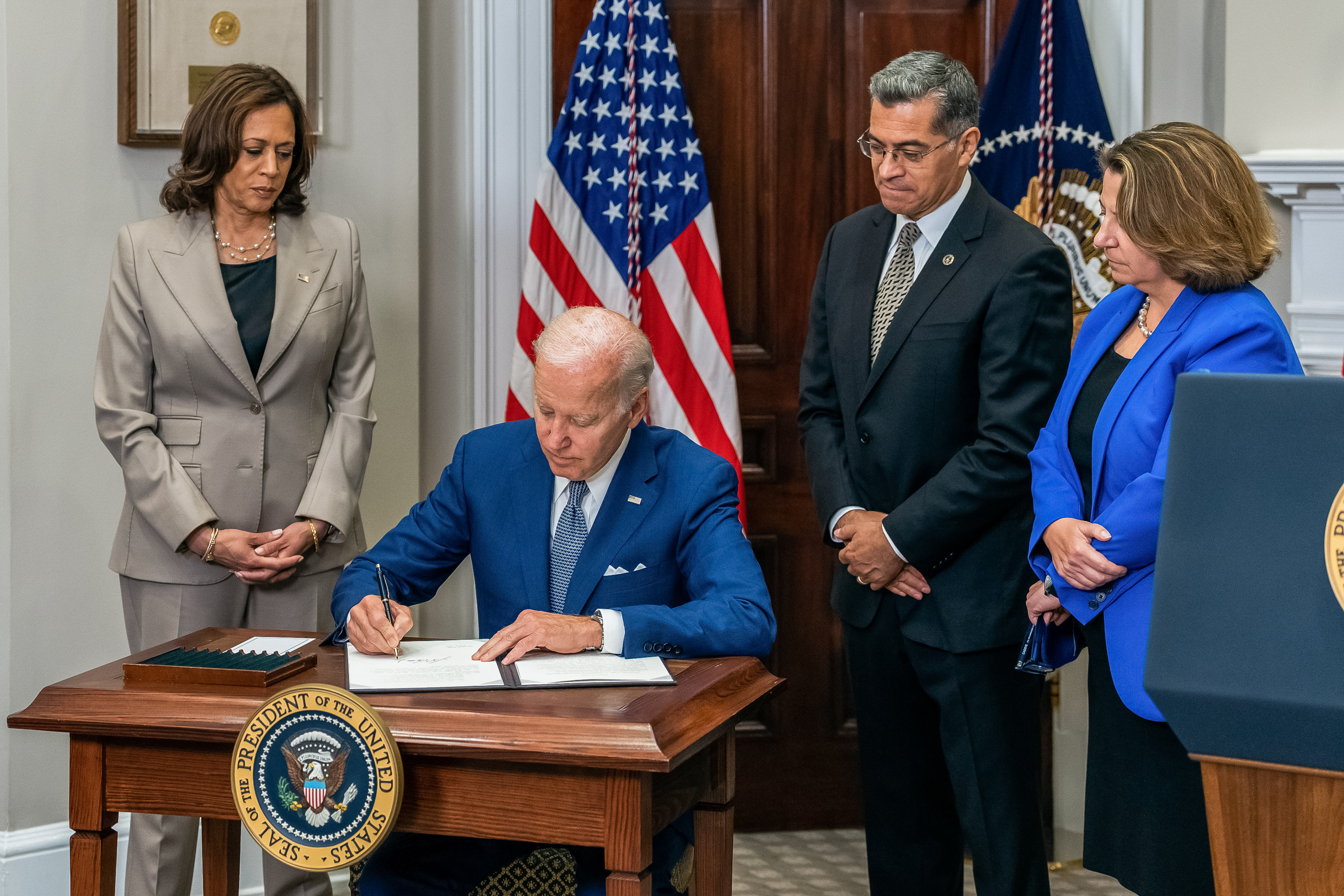
- President Joe Biden signs the executive order in the Roosevelt Room of the White House on July 8, 2022
- Type: Executive order
- Number: 14076
- President: Joe Biden
- Signed: July 8, 2022

Federal Register details
- Federal Register document number: 2022-15138
- Publication date: July 13, 2022

Summary
- In light of the United States Supreme Court's decision in Dobbs v. Jackson Women's Health Organization, the United States is taking measures to protect access to reproductive healthcare services.

Repealed by
- Enforcing the Hyde Amendment, January 24, 2025

Executive Order 14076, officially titled Protecting Access to Reproductive Healthcare Services, was signed on July 8, 2022, and is the 92nd executive order signed by President of the United States Joe Biden. The order directs the Department of Health and Human Services, the Federal Trade Commission, and the Department of Justice to take and consider steps in their respective fields to protect reproductive healthcare services and access to them.

== Provisions ==
The order directs the Department of Health and Human Services to expand access to contraceptives, requests the Federal Trade Commission protect patients' reproductive health privacy, and directs the Department of Justice to organize a group of pro bono lawyers to defend women charged with having an abortion.
