= Executive Order 14182 =

2025 executive order signed by Trump

- "Enforcing the Hyde Amendment"
- Front page of Executive Order 14182
- Type: Executive order
- Number: 14182
- President: Donald Trump
- Signed: January 24, 2025

Federal Register details
- Federal Register document number: 2025-02175
- Publication date: January 24, 2025

Summary
- The executive order ends federal funding for elective abortions, revokes prior related orders, and directs agencies to implement the policy.

Executive Order 14182, titled "Enforcing the Hyde Amendment", is an executive order signed by Donald Trump, the 47th President of the United States, on January 24, 2025 that revokes two key orders from the previous Biden administration, specifically Executive Orders 14076 and 14079, which expanded access to reproductive healthcare, including abortion services, following the overturn of Roe v. Wade. This new order reaffirms the policy established by the Hyde Amendment, which prohibits the use of federal taxpayer dollars for elective abortions, reversing the actions taken by the prior administration to provide federal funding for abortion-related services and programs.

== Background ==
=== Trump's first term ===
The first Trump administration reinstated and expanded the "Mexico City policy," a rule originally established by President Ronald Reagan, which prohibits U.S. funding for organizations that provide abortion services or support groups that do. Upon taking office in 2017, President Donald Trump extended this policy to apply to all health programs, not just those related to reproductive health. The policy has been criticized by opponents, who argue that it reduces funding for essential health services in developing countries, such as birth control, infant nutrition, and HIV/AIDS treatment, while supporters view it as a way to align U.S. foreign aid with anti-abortion principles.

=== Under Biden ===
In response to the Supreme Court’s Dobbs decision, which overturned Roe v. Wade, President Joe Biden signed two key executive orders to protect reproductive rights.

On July 8, 2022, he issued Executive Order 14076, which directed the Department of Health and Human Services (HHS) to expand access to contraceptives, and the Department of Justice to provide legal support for women facing abortion-related charges.

Later, on August 3, 2022, President Biden signed Executive Order 14079, aimed at securing access to reproductive and other healthcare services. This order sought to protect patients' privacy and ensure equal access to healthcare, especially in the face of restrictive state laws. It addressed the challenges posed by state-level abortion bans and aimed to safeguard reproductive rights. The order called for federal action to support women's health, mitigate confusion around healthcare provisions, and protect the ability of patients to access care, including abortion services, across state lines.

=== Trump's second term ===
President Donald Trump signed an executive order enforcing the Hyde Amendment and rescinding actions from the Biden administration intended to expand abortion access. These moves coincided with the March for Life, where Trump addressed the rally by video and Vice President JD Vance spoke in person.

== Provisions ==
- Federal taxpayer dollars should not fund elective abortions (in line with the Hyde Amendment).
- Revokes two 2022 executive orders:
  - Executive Order 14076 (July 8, 2022)
  - Executive Order 14079 (August 3, 2022)
- Director of the Office of Management and Budget to ensure agencies implement this policy.

== See also ==
- List of executive orders in the first presidency of Donald Trump
- List of executive actions by Joe Biden
- List of executive orders in the second presidency of Donald Trump
