= Executive Order 14383 =

US arms transfer strategy policy

- Establishing an America First Arms Transfer Strategy
- Type: Executive order
- Number: 14383
- President: Donald Trump
- Signed: February 6, 2026

Federal Register details
- Publication date: February 11, 2026

Executive Order 14383, titled Establishing an America First Arms Transfer Strategy, is an executive order signed by U.S. President Donald Trump on February 6, 2026. It directs federal agencies to prioritise arms transfers as a tool of foreign policy and to expand domestic defence industrial capacity.

== Background ==
The order builds on prior efforts to reform U.S. arms export processes and improve coordination and efficiency in foreign military sales. The order marked a shift in U.S. arms sales policy by prioritising foreign military sales to partners with higher defence spending and strategic importance, while aiming to expand domestic production capacity. The order also re-prioritised U.S. weapons customers in favour of countries with higher defence spending and strategic importance, replacing prior first-come, first-served practices.
