= Executive Order 14307 =

2025 executive order signed by Donald Trump

- Long title: Unleashing American Drone Dominance

Legislative history
- Signed into law by President Donald Trump on June 6, 2025

Executive Order 14307, titled Unleashing American Drone Dominance, is an executive order signed by U.S. President Donald Trump on June 6, 2025. The order directs federal agencies to expand domestic unmanned aircraft system (UAS) production and reduce reliance on foreign-manufactured drones.

== Background ==
U.S. officials raised national security concerns about foreign-made drones, particularly those produced by DJI. The order followed earlier procurement restrictions under the National Defense Authorization Act. The order was issued alongside measures to strengthen counter-drone capabilities and enhance airspace security ahead of major events such as the 2026 FIFA World Cup and the 2028 Summer Olympics. In December 2025, the Federal Communications Commission banned the distribution of new foreign-made drones in the United States on national security grounds.

== Provisions ==
The order directs federal agencies to prioritize U.S.-manufactured drones and restrict the use of certain foreign suppliers. It was issued alongside broader policy efforts to expand domestic drone capabilities and commercial applications. The order directs federal agencies to prioritize U.S.-manufactured drones and restrict the use of certain foreign suppliers, while also expanding commercial drone operations beyond line of sight and introducing stricter measures to address national security, terrorism, and public safety risks as part of broader efforts to develop domestic drone capabilities, commercial applications, and advanced aviation technologies.

These measures coincided with increasing attention to the role of low-cost unmanned systems in modern conflicts, which have lowered barriers to air capability and influenced efforts to accelerate domestic drone development.
