= Executive Order 14398 =

Restrictions on DEI in contracting

- Long title: Addressing DEI Discrimination by Federal Contractors

Legislative history
- Signed into law by President Donald Trump on March 26, 2026

Executive Order 14398, titled Addressing DEI Discrimination by Federal Contractors, is an executive order signed by President Donald Trump on March 26, 2026, that prohibits diversity, equity, and inclusion (DEI) practices by federal contractors and their subcontractors and requires federal contracts to include provisions prohibiting such activities.

== Background ==
Following the inauguration of President Donald Trump, a series of executive orders sought to eliminate diversity, equity, and inclusion (DEI) programs across federal agencies and contractors, while encouraging similar changes in the private sector. Shortly after taking office, Trump also revoked a decades-old executive order requiring federal contractors to address workplace discrimination and ordered a review of contractors civil rights compliance to assess potential violations. The order formed part of a broader set of measures affecting DEI-related policies, including actions targeting federal contractors and developments that led some companies to scale back or modify such programs.
