= Executive Order 14355 =

AI pediatric cancer research order

- Long title: Unlocking Cures for Pediatric Cancer with Artificial Intelligence

Legislative history
- Signed into law by President Donald Trump on September 30, 2025

Executive Order 14355, titled Unlocking Cures for Pediatric Cancer with Artificial Intelligence, is an executive order signed by U.S. President Donald Trump on September 30, 2025. The order directs federal agencies to expand the use of artificial intelligence in pediatric cancer research, including improving diagnostics, treatment development, and clinical trial design.

== Background ==
The order was issued in the context of increasing pediatric cancer incidence and ongoing federal efforts to expand data-driven research infrastructure, including initiatives focused on large-scale data collection and analysis to improve outcomes.

The order builds on the Childhood Cancer Data Initiative, a 10-year, $500 million federal program focused on collecting and sharing pediatric cancer data to support research. The order was announced alongside an additional $50 million in funding to expand a national childhood cancer data initiative and support research projects applying artificial intelligence to pediatric cance.
