= Executive Order 14207 =

Executive order eliminating FEI

- Long title: Eliminating the Federal Executive Institute

Legislative history
- Signed into law by President Donald Trump on February 10, 2025

Executive Order 14207, titled Eliminating the Federal Executive Institute, is an executive order signed by U.S. President Donald Trump on February 10, 2025. The order directs the elimination of the Federal Executive Institute (FEI), a federal leadership training program administered by the United States Office of Personnel Management.

== Background ==
The order was part of a broader series of executive actions issued by Trump on February 10, 2025, including measures affecting other federal programs and agencies. The order states that the Federal Executive Institute, established during the Johnson administration, should be eliminated and that prior executive branch documents providing for its existence are revoked.
