= Executive Order 14393 =

Executive order on mortgage access

- Long title: Promoting Access to Mortgage Credit

Legislative history
- Signed into law by President Donald Trump on March 13, 2026

Executive Order 14393, titled Promoting Access to Mortgage Credit, is an executive order signed by President Donald Trump on March 13, 2026. The order establishes a federal policy to improve the availability and affordability of mortgage credit by reducing regulatory burdens, particularly for community and smaller banks, and directs federal agencies to consider reforms to mortgage lending, supervision, and housing finance systems.

== Background ==
The order was issued as part of broader administration efforts to address housing affordability, including measures to reduce regulatory barriers affecting homebuilding and mortgage lending. The order followed concerns that regulatory changes in mortgage lending had increased costs, reduced participation by community banks, and limited access to credit for some borrowers.
