= Executive Order 14386 =

Coal power for national defense

- Strengthening United States National Defense With America's Beautiful Clean Coal Power Generation Fleet
- Type: Executive order
- President: Donald Trump
- Signed: February 11, 2026

Federal Register details
- Federal Register document number: 2026-03156
- Publication date: February 17, 2026

Executive Order 14386, titled Strengthening United States National Defense With America's Beautiful Clean Coal Power Generation Fleet, is an executive order signed by U.S. President Donald Trump on February 11, 2026. The order directs federal agencies to support the use of coal-fired power generation for national defense purposes, including through long-term power procurement agreements for military and critical infrastructure facilities.

== Background ==
The order was issued amid concerns over the reliability of the United States electric grid and its role in supporting military operations and defense-industrial production. It followed reports that the administration planned to direct the Department of Defense to support coal-fired power plants through procurement agreements for military energy needs. The order directs the Department of Defense to enter into long-term contracts with coal-fired power plants to supply electricity for military installations. It emphasizes maintaining a resilient electricity supply for national defense and prioritizing coal-based energy assets, including through long-term power purchase agreements.
