= Executive Order 14394 =

Reducing barriers to affordable housing construction

- Long title: Removing Regulatory Barriers to Affordable Home Construction

Legislative history
- Signed into law by President Donald Trump on March 13, 2026

Executive Order 14394, titled Removing Regulatory Barriers to Affordable Home Construction, is an executive order signed by President Donald Trump on March 13, 2026. The order states that regulatory barriers and slow permitting processes have increased housing costs and establishes a policy to reduce such barriers to promote housing affordability.

== Background ==
In early 2026, the U.S. housing market faced ongoing affordability challenges driven by elevated construction costs, labor shortages, limited housing supply, and higher borrowing costs. In response to these conditions, a housing package aimed at increasing the supply of affordable housing advanced in the United States Senate in March 2026, reflecting broader legislative efforts to expand access to homeownership, particularly for first-time buyers. During the same period, President Donald Trump signed a set of executive orders aimed at increasing housing construction and improving access to mortgages as part of a broader effort to address housing affordability. In March 2026, the United States Senate moved toward passing Executive Order 14394 aimed at increasing housing supply, improving financing options, and easing regulatory constraints on residential construction.
