= Executive Order 14180 =

FEMA reform executive order

Council to Assess the Federal Emergency Management Agency
- Long title: Executive Order establishing the Federal Emergency Management Agency Review Council

Citations
- Public law: Executive Order 14180

Legislative history
- Introduced in the Executive branch by President of the United States; Signed into law by President Donald Trump on January 24, 2025

Executive Order 14180, titled "Council to Assess the Federal Emergency Management Agency", is an executive order issued on January 24, 2025, by U.S. President Donald Trump, establishing a review council to assess the performance and structure of the Federal Emergency Management Agency (FEMA) and to recommend potential reforms. Though the review council was originally designed to terminate one year after the order, this deadline was later extended by Executive Order 14378 to March 25th, 2026. Then one day before the deadline, on March 24th, 2026, Executive Order 14397 further extended the deadline until May 29, 2026 to submit their final report.

== Background ==
The order followed criticism of the Federal Emergency Management Agency’s response to disasters including Hurricane Helene, alongside calls to improve its effectiveness and priorities. Media reports also indicated internal concerns about the agency’s preparedness, including delays in planning ahead of the hurricane season. Early in his second term, President Trump criticized FEMA as ineffective and suggested significant changes to its structure and role in disaster response.
