= Executive Order 14396 =

U.S. order on college football

- Long title: Preserving America's Game

Legislative history
- Signed into law by President Donald Trump on March 20, 2026

Executive Order 14396, titled Preserving America's Game, is an executive order signed by U.S. President Donald Trump on March 20, 2026. The order establishes a federal policy regarding college football broadcasting and directs federal officials to coordinate with relevant organizations with the goal of establishing an exclusive broadcast window for the Army–Navy Game.

== Background ==
The order was issued in the context of concerns over scheduling conflicts in college football, particularly efforts to preserve the traditional standalone time slot of the Army-Navy Game amid proposed expansions to the College Football Playoff. The order directs the Federal Communications Commission to consider whether broadcast licensing requirements should include preserving a dedicated time slot for the Army-Navy Game, with some reporting noting that it could increase pressure on broadcasters airing competing games. The order was presented by the administration as a measure to protect the traditional status of the Army-Navy Game from potential conflicts arising from the expansion of the College Football Playoff.
