= Executive Order 14364 =

US food supply competition order

- Long title: Addressing Security Risks from Price Fixing and Anti-Competitive Behavior in the Food Supply Chain

Legislative history
- Signed into law by President Donald Trump on December 6, 2025

Executive Order 14364, titled Addressing Security Risks from Price Fixing and Anti-Competitive Behavior in the Food Supply Chain, is an executive order signed by U.S. President Donald Trump on December 6, 2025. The order directs federal authorities to investigate anti-competitive practices within the United States food supply chain and assess potential national security risks associated with such conduct.

== Background ==
In November 2025, the U.S. Department of Justice launched an investigation into major meatpacking companies over potential collusion to increase beef prices. The order was issued amid concerns about the impact of anti-competitive behaviour on food prices and supply stability in the United States. It was announced alongside a federal probe into alleged price fixing and price manipulation in the meatpacking sector. The order established task forces within the Department of Justice and the Federal Trade Commission to investigate anti-competitive practices in food-related industries and consider enforcement or regulatory action where appropriate. The measures extended federal scrutiny beyond meatpacking companies to the broader food supply chain, including processors and retailers. In commentary, U.S. Secretary of Agriculture Brooke Rollins stated that anti-competitive behaviour, including price fixing by foreign-controlled corporations, has affected the fairness of the agricultural system and the affordability of the U.S. food supply.
