= Executive Order 14372 =

Executive order on defense contracting

- Long title: Prioritizing the Warfighter in Defense Contracting

Legislative history
- Signed into law by President Donald Trump on January 7, 2026

Executive Order 14372, titled Prioritizing the Warfighter in Defense Contracting, is an executive order signed by President Donald Trump on January 7, 2026. The order establishes a federal policy to accelerate defense procurement and strengthen the defense industrial base by prioritizing warfighter capability and readiness, including measures to address contractor performance, production capacity, and delivery timelines.

== Background ==
Prior to the order, lawmakers and analysts had raised concerns that some major U.S. defense contractors were prioritising shareholder returns, including stock buybacks and dividends, over timely weapons production and contract performance. In the weeks following the order, the Pentagon began preparations to identify underperforming contractors that could face restrictions on such payouts, linking shareholder compensation to contract performance and delivery timelines.
