= Proposed United States sovereign wealth fund =

A sovereign wealth fund for the federal government of the United States has been theorized since 2008.

== Early comparisons and concepts ==
In September 2008, amid the Great Recession, secretary of the treasury Henry Paulson offered a proposal to establish a US$700 billion Treasury-directed fund that would acquire depressed mortgage assets. The New York Times compared the fund to the Abu Dhabi Investment Authority.

In January 2023, Semafor reported that senators Bill Cassidy and Angus King were drafting legislation to ensure the solvency of Social Security through a sovereign wealth fund that would exceed US$1.5 trillion.

== Campaign proposals and Biden administration discussions ==
In September 2024, Bloomberg News reported that national security advisor Jake Sullivan and his deputy, Daleep Singh, had been developing proposals for a sovereign wealth fund for months, though its structure, funding model, and investment strategy remained unclear. That month, Donald Trump called for a sovereign wealth fund in a speech to the Economic Club of New York. According to The Wall Street Journal, Biden administration officials had examined India's National Investment and Infrastructure Fund, the Ireland Strategic Investment Fund, the Government of Singapore Investment Corporation, the United Kingdom's National Wealth Fund, Saudi Arabia's Public Investment Fund, and the Abu Dhabi Investment Authority, in addition to historical examples, including the Reconstruction Finance Corporation.

== Trump administration efforts ==
Prior to the second inauguration of Donald Trump, his advisors began examining the possibility of using the U.S. International Development Finance Corporation as a sovereign wealth fund, according to Bloomberg News. The concept gained hold among several of Trump's associates, including Elon Musk and Steve Feinberg. Potential nominees to lead the corporation included David Bohigian, George King III, and Ted Yoho. On February 3, 2025, Trump signed an executive order to establish a sovereign wealth fund, proposing that it could be used to finance an acquisition of TikTok. Secretary of commerce Howard Lutnick suggested that the fund could be used to ensure accountability, citing investments in drug companies that manufacture COVID-19 vaccines as an example.

== Responses ==
The hedge fund manager John Paulson told Bloomberg News in September 2024 that he supported a U.S. sovereign wealth fund that would surpass the US$1.7 trillion Government Pension Fund of Norway. Joseph Bankman, a professor at Stanford Law School, and Mark P. Gergen, a professor at the UC Berkeley School of Law, argued in February 2025 that the United States should eliminate the corporate tax and force corporations to issue non-voting shares to the sovereign wealth fund, using the fund's income as a replacement for the corporate tax. Pat Gelsinger, the former chief executive of Intel, expressed support for a sovereign wealth fund in order to "win the global race for technological supremacy" in an op-ed for The Wall Street Journal in July.

Tyler Cowen, a professor at George Mason University, criticized the concept of a U.S. sovereign wealth fund in an op-ed for Bloomberg News in September 2024, noting the national debt of the United States would necessitate borrowing to establish a fund. Former secretary of the treasury Lawrence Summers referred to Trump's proposal as "incomplete" on Bloomberg Television. Jared Bernstein, the chair of Council of Economic Advisers, stated that he was unaware of sovereign wealth fund proposals and that he would be "very wary" of establishing a fund. The conservative economist Douglas Holtz-Eakin criticized the lack of oversight for such a fund; similarly, Dimitri Burshtein compared the political influence of a sovereign wealth fund to environmental, social, and governance policies instituted by BlackRock. The editorial board at The Wall Street Journal compiled several reasons to criticize Trump's sovereign wealth fund, while the editorial board of Bloomberg News expressed concern over "risky equity investing".

== Works cited ==
- Bankman, Joseph; Gergen, Mark (February 24, 2025). "How Trump's sovereign wealth fund could solve a tax problem". The Washington Post.
- Basak, Sonali; Lowenkron, Hadriana (September 5, 2024). "Paulson Echoes Trump's Ambitions for US Sovereign Wealth Fund". Bloomberg News.
- Burshtein, Dimitri (March 11, 2025). "The Last Thing America Needs Is a Sovereign Wealth Fund". The Wall Street Journal.
- Cowen, Tyler (September 10, 2024). "A Sovereign Wealth Fund Wouldn't Work for the US". Bloomberg News.
- Donnan, Shawn; Deaux, Joe; Martin, Eric (January 17, 2025). "Trump Team Has Wealth-Fund Ambitions for Small Lending Agency". Bloomberg News.
- The Editorial Board (February 6, 2025). "'Sovereign Wealth' for Politicians". The Wall Street Journal.
- The Editorial Board (February 13, 2025). "Beware the US 'Sovereign Wealth Fund' Boondoggle". Bloomberg News.
- Gelsinger, Pat (July 15, 2025). "A Sovereign-Wealth Fund to Keep America's Technological Edge". The Wall Street Journal.
- Ip, Greg; Gottfried, Miriam (September 8, 2024). "Biden and Trump Are Both Eyeing a Sovereign-Wealth Fund. Why?". The Wall Street Journal.
- Leonard, Jenny; Burton, Katherine (February 3, 2025). "Trump Signs Executive Action to Create Sovereign Wealth Fund". Bloomberg News.
- Rappeport, Alan (September 10, 2024). "Trump and Democrats Agree: U.S. Needs a National Wealth Fund for Investments". The New York Times.
- "The U.S. joins the sovereign wealth fund crowd". The New York Times. September 22, 2008.
- Wingrove, Josh (September 6, 2024). "Biden Aides Working on Proposal for US Sovereign Wealth Fund". Bloomberg News.
- Zeballos-Roig, Joseph (January 20, 2023). "Senators are working on a bipartisan Social Security bill with a big twist". Semafor.
- Zeballos-Roig, Joseph (February 28, 2023). "A bipartisan group of Senators is talking about raising the retirement age on Social Security". Semafor.
