= Executive Order 14205 =

White House Faith Office executive order

Establishment of the White House Faith Office
- Long title: Executive Order 14205

Citations
- Public law: Executive Order 14205

Legislative history
- Introduced in the Executive branch by President of the United States; Signed into law by President Donald Trump on February 7, 2025

Executive Order 14205, titled Establishment of the White House Faith Office, is an executive order signed by U.S. President Donald Trump on February 7, 2025. The order establishes the White House Faith Office within the Executive Office of the President to coordinate engagement with faith-based and community organizations.

== Background ==
The order establishes a policy supporting faith-based entities, community organizations, and houses of worship in providing social services and community support. It creates the White House Faith Office within the Domestic Policy Council, led by a senior advisor, to coordinate federal efforts, advise on policy, and facilitate partnerships with such organizations. The order followed statements by President Trump that the office would be created alongside efforts to address what he described as anti-Christian bias within the federal government.
