= Executive Order 14397 =

Continuance of FEMA review council

- Long title: Further Continuance of the Federal Emergency Management Agency Review Council

Legislative history
- Signed into law by President Donald Trump on March 24, 2026

Executive Order 14397, titled Further Continuance of the Federal Emergency Management Agency Review Council, is an executive order signed by President Donald Trump on March 24, 2026.

== Background ==
In 2025, President Donald Trump signed an executive order establishing a FEMA Review Council to evaluate the agency. The council was subsequently continued by Executive Order 14378. Under Executive Order 14397, the council’s mandate was further extended until 10 days after the submission of the report required under section 3(c) of Executive Order 14180, or May 29, 2026, whichever occurs first. A 2025 opinion article in The Wall Street Journal stated that the Trump administration had considered reducing the role of the Federal Emergency Management Agency (FEMA) as part of broader efforts to shrink the federal government. In March 2026, FEMA reinstated a disaster prevention grant program following a federal court ruling that its earlier termination by the administration was unlawful.
