= Executive Order 14153 =

Executive order on Alaska resources

Unleashing Alaska’s Extraordinary Resource Potential
- Long title: Executive Order on Unleashing Alaska’s Extraordinary Resource Potential

Citations
- Public law: Executive Order

Legislative history
- Introduced in the Executive branch; Signed into law by President Donald Trump on January 20, 2025

Unleashing Alaska’s Extraordinary Resource Potential is an executive order issued on January 20, 2025, by U.S. President Donald Trump, directing the expansion of natural resource development in Alaska to support economic growth, employment, and national security.

== Background ==
Alaska’s Arctic region has long been a focus of debate over oil and gas development, involving economic, environmental, and regulatory considerations. The order seeks to expand drilling in parts of the Arctic National Wildlife Refuge and reverse restrictions on resource development and related infrastructure projects. The order directs federal agencies to expedite permitting and leasing of natural resource projects in Alaska and to rescind restrictions introduced under the previous administration. In parts of Alaska, revenues from oil and gas development have been a significant source of funding for local government services and infrastructure.
