= Executive Order 14387 =

US order on phosphorus supply

- Promoting the National Defense by Ensuring an Adequate Supply of Elemental Phosphorus and Glyphosate-Based Herbicides
- Type: Executive order
- Number: 14387
- President: Donald Trump
- Signed: February 18, 2026

Federal Register details
- Federal Register document number: 2026-03628
- Publication date: February 23, 2026

Executive Order 14387, titled Promoting the National Defense by Ensuring an Adequate Supply of Elemental Phosphorus and Glyphosate-Based Herbicides is an executive order signed by U.S. President Donald Trump on February 18, 2026. The order invokes the Defense Production Act of 1950 to prioritize domestic production of elemental phosphorus and glyphosate-based herbicides for defense and agricultural purposes.

== Background ==
The order was issued amid concerns about limited domestic production capacity of elemental phosphorus and reliance on imports for materials used in defense technologies and agriculture. It invokes the Defense Production Act to ensure an adequate domestic supply of elemental phosphorus and glyphosate-based herbicides. The measure followed concerns about supply pressures in the United States, where domestic glyphosate production is limited and supplemented by imports of generic alternatives. The order also directs federal authorities to prioritize and, if necessary, compel the production of glyphosate and related materials for national security purposes.

== See also ==
- Glyphosate-based herbicides
- Health effects of pesticides
