= Executive Order 14366 =

Executive order on proxy oversight

Protecting American Investors from Foreign-Owned and Politically-Motivated Proxy Advisors
- Long title: Executive Order 14366

Legislative history
- Signed into law by President Donald Trump on December 11, 2025

Executive Order 14366, titled Protecting American Investors from Foreign-Owned and Politically-Motivated Proxy Advisors, is an executive order signed by U.S. President Donald Trump on December 11, 2025. It directs federal agencies to review and potentially revise regulations governing proxy advisory firms, including rules related to shareholder voting, transparency, and conflicts of interest.

== Background ==
The order was issued amid concerns regarding the influence of proxy advisory firms on corporate governance and investment decisions, including the role of dominant firms in the market. Prior to the order, administration officials had considered measures to restrict the influence of proxy advisers and large asset managers in shareholder voting. The order directs the chair of the Securities and Exchange Commission to review regulations related to proxy advisers and consider revising or rescinding guidance deemed inconsistent with the order, including those related to environmental, social, and governance and diversity policies. It also directs the Federal Trade Commission, the Department of Justice, and the Department of Labor to examine related regulatory, antitrust, and fiduciary issues concerning proxy advisers and their role in corporate governance.

The order directed U.S. regulators to review major proxy advisory firms, including Institutional Shareholder Services and Glass Lewis, for potential regulatory and antitrust concerns.
