= Executive Order 14400 =

2026 U.S. executive order on NCAA rules

- Long title: Urgent National Action to Save College Sports

Legislative history
- Signed into law by President Donald Trump on April 3, 2026

Executive Order 14400, titled Urgent National Action to Save College Sports, is an executive order signed by U.S. President Donald Trump on April 3, 2026. The order outlines federal policy measures relating to college athletics and directs relevant agencies to assess and implement actions concerning the governance and structure of collegiate sports.

== Background ==
The order calls for the National Collegiate Athletic Association (NCAA) to revise its rules, including measures to limit athlete transfers and impose conditions on name, image, and likeness (NIL) arrangements, with potential consequences for institutions that do not comply. The order proposes changes to eligibility rules, including a five-year participation limit and restrictions on athlete transfers, while also directing federal agencies to ensure compliance by universities.
