= Executive Order 14362 =

US order on Muslim Brotherhood designations

- Long title: Designation of Certain Muslim Brotherhood Chapters as Foreign Terrorist Organizations and Specially Designated Global Terrorists

Legislative history
- Signed into law by President Donald Trump on November 24, 2025

Executive Order 14362, titled Designation of Certain Muslim Brotherhood Chapters as Foreign Terrorist Organizations and Specially Designated Global Terrorists, is an executive order signed by U.S. President Donald Trump on November 24, 2025. The order initiates a process for the potential designation of certain Muslim Brotherhood chapters as Foreign Terrorist Organizations and Specially Designated Global Terrorists under existing U.S. law.

== Background ==
The order was issued in the context of concerns regarding activities attributed to certain Muslim Brotherhood chapters and their potential impact on United States national security and regional stability. The order did not immediately designate any groups, but directed federal officials to assess specific chapters and take further action, potentially leading to financial and travel restrictions on targeted entities.

It initiates a process requiring the Secretary of State and the Secretary of the Treasury to evaluate whether specific chapters, including those in Lebanon, Egypt, and Jordan, should be designated under applicable terrorism sanctions frameworks. In January 2026, the United States designated the Egyptian, Lebanese, and Jordanian branches of the Muslim Brotherhood as specially designated global terrorists, a step that triggered sanctions following the process initiated by the order.
