= Timeline of the George H. W. Bush presidency (1989) =

The following is a timeline of the presidency of George H. W. Bush from his inauguration as the 41st president of the United States on January 20, 1989, to December 31, 1989.

== January ==
- January 20 – George H. W. Bush's presidency begins with his inauguration at the United States Capitol in Washington, D.C.; the oath of office is administered by Chief Justice William Rehnquist.
- January 21 – President Bush greets White House visitors at the Executive Entrance, speaks to reporters in the Oval Office, and delivers a speech to members of his campaign for the presidency and supporters in the Diplomatic Reception Room of the State Department during the morning hours.
- January 23 – President Bush calls Mikhail Gorbachev and "other foreign leaders" to thank them for their positive sentiments. In the East Room, Bush attends the swearing in of staff members. Bush meets with United States National Security Advisor Brent Scowcroft and White House Chief of Staff John Sununu and afterward phones an anti-abortion rally.
- January 25 – President Bush announces his nominations of W. Henson Moore for United States Deputy Secretary of Energy, and Susan S. Engeleiter for Administrator of the Small Business Administration. President Bush signs an executive order creating the President's Commission on Federal Ethics Law Reform.
- January 27 – President Bush holds his first news conference in the Briefing Room of the White House during the morning. President Bush answers questions from reporters on the federal pay raise, relations with Congress, relations between the United States and the Soviet Union, American foreign policy initiatives, minimum wage, the Strategic Defense Initiative, federal pay raise, his first days in office, monetary policy, the saving and loan crisis abortion, tax increases, relations between the United States and Iran, affirmative action, hostages in the Middle East, the war on drugs, and his agenda. James Baker is sworn in as the 61st United States Secretary of State in the East Room of the White House during the afternoon.
- January 27 – Jack Kemp, while appearing at hearing of the Senate Banking, Housing and Urban Development Committee, denounces homelessness and the cuts to housing programs implemented under the Reagan administration.
- January 30 – Elizabeth Dole is sworn in as the 20th United States Secretary of Labor in the Great Hall at the Department of Labor during the morning.

== February ==
- February 1 – President Bush sends Congress a report on the functions and purposes of the National Space Council. President Bush announces the nomination of Kenneth Winston Starr for Solicitor General of the United States.
- February 2 – President Bush attends the National Prayer Breakfast taking place within the International Crystal Ballroom at the Washington Hilton Hotel during the evening. President Bush announces the nomination of Richard R. Burt for an Ambassador ranking while serving as United States Negotiator for Strategic Nuclear Arms.
- February 3 – President Bush delivers remarks on the saving and loan crisis during a morning appearance in the Cabinet Room. Robert A. Mosbacher is sworn in as the 28th United States Secretary of Commerce in the Malcolm Baldrige Great Hall at the Department of Commerce during the morning. President Bush attends a luncheon for business leaders in the East Room during the afternoon.
- February 4 – The White House releases a statement on the request of Louis Sullivan to have "the executive committee of the board of the Morehouse School of Medicine to grant him an unpaid leave of absence as a professor of medicine."
- February 6 – Carla Anderson Hills is sworn in as the 10th United States Trade Representative in the Indian Treaty Room during the afternoon.
- February 7 – Press Secretary Marlin Fitzwater says President Bush has "decided against intervening in the proposed acquisition of Monsanto Electronic Materials Company (MEMC) by Huels AG of West Germany." President Bush signs H.J. Res. 129, rescinding proposed pay increases for members of Congress, officials within the executive branch, and federal judges.
- February 8 – Manuel Lujan, Jr. is sworn in as the 46th United States Secretary of the Interior in the Department of the Interior auditorium during the morning. William K. Reilly is sworn in as Administrator of the Environmental Protection Agency at Waterside Mall during the morning. In a statement, President Bush announces that he will receive advising from the Economic Policy Council and the Domestic Policy Council "in the formulation, coordination, and implementation of economic and domestic policy."
- February 9 – President Bush delivers an address before a joint session of the members of Congress outlining his administration goals.
- February 10 – President Bush meets with Prime Minister of Canada Brian Mulroney in the latter's residence. The two leaders later answer questions from reporters on acid rain, the American economy, agriculture, the environment, Canadian steel exports, and relations between the East and West during the afternoon.
- February 13 – President Bush addresses the Business and Industry Association of New Hampshire in the Armory at the Center of New Hampshire Holiday Inn in Manchester, New Hampshire during the morning. Jack Kemp is sworn in as the 9th United States Secretary of Housing and Urban Development in the cafeteria at the Department of Housing and Urban Development during the afternoon.
- February 14 – President Bush announces the nomination of Roy M. Goodman for membership on the Board of Directors of the Overseas Private Investment Corporation.
- February 15 – President Bush addresses the South Carolina State Legislature in the house chamber of the State capitol in Columbia, South Carolina during the morning. President Bush announces the nomination of Richard J. Kerr for deputy director of Central Intelligence. President Bush announces the appointment of Francis S.M. Hodsoll as Executive Associate Director of the Office of Management and Budget and Chief Financial Officer.
- February 16 – Clayton Yeutter is sworn in as the 23rd United States Secretary of Agriculture on the patio at the Department of Agriculture during the morning.
- February 17 – President Bush delivers an address to students at Washington University at the university field house in St. Louis, Missouri during the morning. President Bush announces the nominations of Elaine Chao for Deputy Secretary of Transportation, and Sidney Linn Williams for Deputy United States Trade Representative.
- February 21 – President Bush announces the appointment of William L. Roper for Deputy Assistant to the President for Domestic Policy and Director of the White House Office of Policy Development.
- February 22 – President Bush announces the nomination of Robert R. Glauber for Under Secretary of the Treasury.
- February 24 – President Bush holds his fourth news conference at the residence of the American Ambassador in Tokyo during the evening. President Bush answers questions on the Tower designation, and his physical health.
- February 26 – President Bush gives a speech during the morning prayer services at Chongmenwen Christian Church reflecting on the changes since his last visit to Beijing. President Bush addresses American Embassy employees on his schedule in Beijing during the afternoon.
- February 27 – President Bush delivers an address to the National Assembly in the National Assembly Hall in Seoul during the afternoon. The speech is first major address of his to take place in foreign country since his inauguration.
- February 28 – President Bush answers questions from reporters on the bookstore bombings, human rights, and the Tower nomination in the Cabinet Room during the afternoon. President Bush announces the nominations of Constance Horner for Under Secretary of Health and Human Services, Mary Sheila Gall for Assistant Secretary of Health and Human Services (Human Development Services), and Douglas P. Mulholland for Assistant Secretary of State (Intelligence and Research).

== March ==
- March 1 – President Bush addresses members of the Small Business Legislative Council in the East Room during the afternoon. President Bush announces the appointment of Mark Albrecht for the Director of the staff of the National Space Council.
- March 2 – President Bush attends a reception for the participants in the National Endowment for the Humanities Teacher-Scholar Program in the East Room during the afternoon. President Bush announces the nomination of William Pelham Barr to be an Assistant Attorney General (Office of Legal Counsel).
- March 3 – President Bush says the administration is formulating a drug plan and expresses the view that Americans not interested in seeing drugs flow into the United States while in the Oval Office during the afternoon. President Bush addresses the winners of the Westinghouse Science Talent Search during an afternoon appearance at the National Academy of Sciences Building.
- March 6 – President Bush attends the Annual Conference of the Veterans of Foreign Wars in the Sheraton Ballroom at the Sheraton Washington Hotel during the morning. President Bush announces the nominations of Anthony Joseph Principi to be Deputy Secretary of Veterans Affairs at the Veterans Administration, and Gerald L. Olson for Assistant Secretary of Health and Human Services (Legislative Affairs).
- March 7 – President Bush addresses members of the Woodrow Wilson International Center for Scholars in the Dining Room at the Department of State during the evening.
- March 9 – James D. Watkins is sworn in as the 6th United States Secretary of Energy in the cafeteria at the Department of Energy during the morning.
- March 10 – Louis W. Sullivan is sworn in as the 17th United States Secretary of Health and Human Services in the Great Hall at the Department of Health and Human Services during the morning. President Bush delivers an address to the National Conference of State Legislators at a briefing in Room 450 of the Old Executive Office Building during the morning. President Bush holds his seventh news conference in the Briefing Room during the afternoon. President Bush answers questions from reporters on the Tower nomination, the Cheney designation, the Strategic Defense Initiative, and defense budget as well as policy. President Bush announces the nomination of Michael Hayden Armacost for United States Ambassador to Japan.
- March 13 – President Bush delivers an address to National Association of Attorneys General members in the Roosevelt Room during the morning. William J. Bennett is sworn in as Director of the Office of National Drug Control Policy in Room 450 of the Old Executive Office building during the morning.
- March 14 – President Bush gives a speech to Anti-Defamation League of B'nai B'rith members at a briefing in Room 450 of the Old Executive Office Building during the morning.
- March 15 – Ed Derwinski is sworn in as the 1st United States Secretary of Veterans Affairs on the South Lawn during the afternoon.
- March 16 – President Bush attends a Forum Club-hosted luncheon at the George R. Brown Convention Center in Houston during the afternoon. President Bush attends the Junior Achievement National Business Hall of Fame Dinner in the ballroom of the International Center during the evening. President Bush announces the nomination of Gilbert E. Carmichael for Administrator of the Federal Railroad Administration.
- March 17 – President Bush holds his eighth news conference aboard Air Force One. President Bush answers questions from reporters on FSX, terrorism, gun control, American hostages in Lebanon, inflation, aid to the Contras, his personal schedule, his visit to Cheyenne Mountain High School, his dog, and his press conferences. President Bush announces the nomination of Kate Leader Moore for Assistant Secretary of Transportation (Budget and Programs).
- March 20 – Thomas R. Pickering is sworn in as the 18th United States Ambassador to the United Nations in the Roosevelt Room during the morning. In a morning appearance in the Indian Treaty Room of the Old Executive Office building, President Bush answers questions from the State Legislators Working Group on his literacy efforts, gubernatorial elections, family issues, gun control, the war on drugs, and minority participation of the Republican Party. President Bush announces the nomination of Julius L. Katz for Deputy United States Trade Representative.
- March 21 – Dick Cheney is sworn in as the 17th United States Secretary of Defense in the Center Courtyard of the Pentagon during the afternoon. President Bush announces the nomination of Janice Obuchowski for Assistant Secretary of Commerce for Communications and Information.
- March 22 – President Bush delivers an address to students at Conestoga Valley High School in the school gymnasium during the morning.
- March 24 – President Bush holds his ninth news conference in the Briefing Room during the morning. President Bush addresses the Central America accord. President Bush gives a speech to the crew of the Space Shuttle Discovery in Room 450 of the Old Executive Office Building during the morning. President Bush announces the nomination of William H. Taft IV for the U.S. Permanent Representative on the Council of the North Atlantic Treaty Organization.
- March 27 – President Bush announces the nominations of William G. Rosenberg for Assistant Administrator of the Environmental Protection Agency for Air and Radiation, Alfred A. DelliBovi for Under Secretary of Housing and Urban Development, and John C. Weicher for Assistant Secretary of Housing and Urban Development for Policy Development and Research.
- March 28 – President Bush answers questions from reporters on the Alaskan oil spill, the bipartisan accord on Central America, and the collaborative jet fighter of the United States and Japan during a morning Oval Office appearance. President Bush makes an appearance at James Madison High School during the morning, answering questions on his dog, schedule, regional conflicts, pay raises in the legislative and judicial branches, the war on drugs, education, Easter, terrorism, aviation safety, and volunteerism during the morning.
- March 29 – The press office of First Lady Barbara Bush announces that she has been found to have Graves' disease. The White House announces that President Bush plans to nominate Wayne Budd for U.S. Attorney in Massachusetts.
- March 30 – Bush administration officials report that the cleanup of the oil-ridden Prince William Sound was hampered by a "slow start" in addition to confirming that President Bush has ruled out the federal government's participation in the effort, citing it as counterproductive.

== April ==
- April 1 – According to a statement by Press Secretary Fitzwater, President Bush meets with President of Venezuela Carlos Andrés Pérez over the debt situation in the latter's country. President Bush states his support for the reforms being carried out by the Venezuelan government. Bush unveiled a new horseshoe pit at the White House on the South Lawn with 150 guests in attendance. The men's horseshoe champion, Jim Knisley, and the women's champion, Diane Lopez, were present. Bush would hold bi-annual horseshoe tournaments at the White House during his presidency, and regularly demonstrate his prowess at the game for dignitaries.
- April 3 – President Bush meets with representatives for the family members of the victims in Pan Am Flight 103 for an hour during the morning. President Bush and President of Egypt Mohammed Hosni Mubarak make a joint appearance in the Rose Garden during the afternoon. President Bush announces the nomination of Alan Charles Raul for General Counsel of the Department of Agriculture.
- April 4 – President Bush attends a White House briefing for members of the American Business Conference in Room 450 of the Old Executive Office Building during the afternoon. President Bush attends a state dinner for the President of Egypt Hosni Mubarak in the State Dining Room during the evening. President Bush announces the nomination of Delos Cy Jamison for Director of the Bureau of Land Management at the Department of the Interior.
- April 5 – President Bush transmits Educational Excellence Act of 1989 to Congress in a message in which he calls for it to be enacted. President Bush attends a presentation ceremony for the National Teacher of the Year Award in the Rose Garden during the morning.
- April 6 – President Bush attends a dinner honoring Prime Minister of Israel Yitzhak Shamir in the State Dining Room during the evening. President Bush announces the appointment of Mary McClure for Special Assistant to the President for Intergovernmental Affairs.
- April 7 – President Bush holds his tenth news conference in the Briefing Room during the morning. President Bush answers questions from reporters on minimum and training wages, oil drilling and exploration, the Polish Roundtable Accords, the peace process in the Middle East, the Alaskan oil spill, Iran arms, and the Iran-Contra affair.
- April 10 – President Bush signs the Whistleblower Protection Act of 1989 in Room 450 of the Old Executive Office Building during the afternoon. The law is said by President Bush to be instrumental in "strengthening the protections and procedural rights available to those Federal employees who report misdeeds and mismanagement." President Bush announces the nomination of Diane Kay Morales for Assistant Secretary of Energy (Environment, Safety and Health).
- April 11 – President Bush attends a presentation ceremony for the President's Volunteer Action Awards in the East Room during the afternoon. President Bush announces the continuation of Eugene J. McAllister in the position of Assistant Secretary of State (Economic and Business Affairs) at the Department of State.
- April 12 – President Bush delivers remarks congratulating the University of Michigan Wolverines over the team's victory in the NCAA Basketball Championship in the Rose Garden during the morning. President Bush announces the nomination of Richard H. Truly for Administrator and Deputy Administrator of NASA in the Roosevelt Room during the afternoon. President Bush announces the nomination of James R. Thompson, Jr. for Deputy Administrator of the National Aeronautics and Space Administration.
- April 17 – President Bush delivers an address at Hamtramck City Hall in Hamtramck, Michigan during the morning.
- April 18 – President Bush attends he National Conference of the Building and Construction Trades Department of the AFL – CIO in the International Ballroom at the Washington Hilton Hotel during the morning. In the afternoon, President Bush speaks during the Farm Radio Broadcast in answering questions on the subjects of agriculture budget and exports, drought relief, and Agriculture Secretary Yeutter. Invoking his predecessor Franklin D. Roosevelt, President Bush signs legislation implementing the bipartisan accord on Central America in the Rose Garden during the afternoon. President Bush transmits "five revised deferrals of budget authority now totaling 9,663,811" in a message to Congress.
- April 19 – President Bush announces the nomination of Morton Isaac Abramowitz for Ambassador Extraordinary and Plenipotentiary of the United States of America to Turkey.
- April 20 – President Bush delivers remarks congratulating the University of Tennessee Lady Volunteers over their victory in the NCAA Basketball Championship during the morning. President Bush and Vice President Quayle deliver remarks in the Vice President's office in the Old Executive Office Building prior to President Bush signing the legislation establishing the National Space Council during the afternoon. President Bush announces the nomination of D. Allan Bromley for Director of the Office of Science and Technology Policy.
- April 21 – President Bush signs a proclamation declaring the upcoming May 1 as "Law Day, 1989" during a morning appearance in the Roosevelt Room. President Bush designates James J. Carey for Acting Chairman of the Federal Maritime Commission.
- April 24 – President Bush attends a memorial service for the victims of the USS Iowa turret explosion in Hangar LP – 2 at the Norfolk Naval Air Station in Norfolk, Virginia during the morning. President Bush attends a luncheon of the Associated Press Business in the Grand Ballroom at the Hyatt Regency Hotel in Chicago during the afternoon. President Bush attends the dedication ceremony for the Centennial Grove in the Great Hall of the State capitol of Bismarck, North Dakota during the afternoon.
- April 25 – President Bush delivers an address to employees of Ford Aerospace Space Systems in the facility's cafeteria courtyard in Palo Alto, California during the morning. President Bush gives a speech to officers outside of the main house at Rancho del Rio during the afternoon. President Bush announces the nomination of Richard L. Armitage for United States Secretary of the Army.
- April 26 – President Bush delivers a speech to the Texas State Legislature in the house chamber of the State Capitol in Austin during the afternoon.
- April 27 – President Bush attends a dedication ceremony for the Michael Bilirakis Alzheimer's Center while in the courtyard of St. Mark Village in Palm Harbor, Florida during the afternoon.
- April 28 – President Bush delivers an address to the American Legislative Exchange Council during a morning briefing in Room 450 of the Old Executive Office Building. President Bush holds his eleventh news conference in the Briefing Room during the afternoon. President Bush announces that "Governments of the United States and Japan have reached understandings that will allow us to proceed with joint development of the FSX fighter aircraft. I'm ready to submit the FSX agreement to Congress for its review."
- April 30 – President Bush attends the bicentennial celebration of the first inauguration of George Washington outside of Federal Hall National Memorial during the afternoon.

== May ==
- May 1 – President Bush delivers an address to the United States Chamber of Commerce at DAR Constitution Hall during the morning. Susan S. Engeleiter is sworn in as the 16th Administrator of the Small Business Administration in the Roosevelt Room during the morning. President Bush announces the nomination of Donald B. Rice for United States Secretary of the Air Force.
- May 2 – President Bush addresses the Council of the Americas in the main auditorium at the Department of State during the morning. President Bush announces the nomination of David J. Gribbin III for Assistant Secretary of Defense (Legislative Affairs). President Bush announces the reappointment of Zvi Kestenbaum for membership on the Commission for the Preservation of America's Heritage Abroad.
- May 3 – President Bush announces the nomination of Sean Charles O'Keefe for Comptroller of the Department of Defense. President Bush transmits the European Economic Community-United States Fishing Agreement in a message to both chambers of Congress. Defense Secretary Cheney tells the Senate Armed Services Committee that President Bush and himself "do not perceive a significant difference in terms of our views of the situation with respect to the Soviet Union."
- May 4 – President Bush attends the National Prayer Breakfast in the State Dining Room during the evening. President Bush announces the nomination of Reggie B. Walton for associate director for National Drug Control Policy (Bureau of State and Local Affairs).
- May 5 – President Bush attends a celebration for Cinco de Mayo in the East Room during the afternoon.
- May 8 – President Bush announces the nomination of Julia Chang Bloch for Ambassador Extraordinary and Plenipotentiary of the United States of America to the Kingdom of Nepal.
- May 9 – President Bush attends a question and answer session in the Shiloh Child Development Center during the morning.
- May 11 – President Bush answers questions from reporters on the Panama situation during an afternoon appearance in the Briefing Room. President Bush announces the nomination of James Franklin Rill for Assistant Attorney General (Antitrust Division) in the Department of Justice.
- May 12 – President Bush announces the nomination of Jerry M. Hunter for General Counsel of the National Labor Relations Board.
- May 13 – President Bush delivers an address at the commencement ceremony at Mississippi State University in the Thurman field during the afternoon. President Bush attends a fundraising reception for Kentucky Senator Mitch McConnell in the reception tent at Lane's End Farm in Lexington, Virginia during the evening.
- May 15 – President Bush attends a Memorial Day ceremony for the National Peace Officers at the West Front of the Capitol during the afternoon.
- May 17 – President Bush delivers an address to American Retail Federation members in Room 450 of the Old Executive Office Building during the morning. President Bush signs a bill reauthorizing the Martin Luther King Jr. Federal Holiday Commission, and making widow Coretta Scott King a Commission member for life, in the East Room during the afternoon. President Bush announces the nomination of Antonio Lopez for associate director of the Federal Emergency Management Agency (National Preparedness Directorate). President Bush announces the continuation of the tenure of Charles E.M. Kolb as Deputy Under Secretary of Education for Planning, Budget, and Evaluation.
- May 18 – President Bush holds a discussion with teachers at Wilson Magnet High School in the school's library during the morning. President Bush makes additional remarks to students at Wilson Magnet in the gymnasium. President Bush delivers an address to Brainpower Coalition supporters in Building One of the Elmgrove Eastman Kodak facility during the afternoon.
- May 21 – President Bush attends the commencement ceremony for Boston University at Dickerson Field during the afternoon.
- May 22 – President Bush attends a White House dinner in honor of American governors in the State Dining Room during the evening. President Bush announces the nomination of Thomas Joseph Murrin for Deputy Secretary of Commerce.
- May 24 – President Bush attends the commencement ceremony for United States Coast Guard Academy on Nitchman Field in New London, Connecticut at the academy during the afternoon.
- May 25 – President Bush announces the nominations of Edward Joseph Perkins for Director General of the Foreign Service at the Department of State, and Fred T. Goldberg, Jr. for Commissioner of Internal Revenue at the Department of the Treasury.
- May 28 – President Bush attends a Memorial Day ceremony at the Sicily-Rome American Cemetery in Nettuno, Italy during the morning.
- May 30 – President Bush attends a dinner hosted by Chancellor of Germany Helmut Kohl in the dining room at the Redoute Castle during the evening.
- May 31 – President Bush delivers remarks to employees of the American embassy and their families during a morning appearance at the residence of Rita Suessmuth. President Bush releases a statement responding to the resignation of House Speaker Jim Wright, lauding Wright in both his character and career as well as wishing him well in his future endeavors.

== June ==
- June 1 – President Bush addresses employees of the American Embassy and their families at the residence of the American ambassador in London during the afternoon. President Bush attends a dinner hosted by Prime Minister of the United Kingdom Margaret Thatcher at 10 Downing Street in London during the evening. President Bush announces the nomination of Shirley Temple Black for Ambassador Extraordinary and Plenipotentiary of the United States of America to the Czechoslovak Socialist Republic. President Bush announces the continued service of Michael Ussery in the position of Ambassador Extraordinary and Plenipotentiary of the United States of America to the Kingdom of Morocco.
- June 2 – President Bush arrives at Pease Air Force Base in Portsmouth, New Hampshire during the afternoon. He delivers remarks there about American foreign allies, anniversaries, and his views.
- June 4 – The White House releases a statement on the death of Ayatollah Khomeini, stating that it is their hope that with his passing, "Iran will now move toward assuming a responsible role in the international community."
- June 5 – President Bush holds his fourteenth news conference in the Briefing Room of the White House during the morning. President Bush answers questions from reporters on student demonstrations in China, Iran, and elections in Poland. President Bush attends the annual meeting of the Business Roundtable in the Capitol Ballroom of the J.W. Marriott Hotel during the evening.
- June 6 – President Bush releases a statement on the forty-fifth anniversary of D-Day reflecting on the event and notes what he calls the successes of allied unity from the previous week. In a statement, President Bush praises the free elections in Poland as signs toward an increase in democracy within the country. President Bush announces the nominations of Sherrie Sandy Rollins for Assistant Secretary of Housing and Urban Development (Public Affairs), and Roy M. Goodman for membership on the National Council on the Arts. President Bush attends the welcoming ceremony for Prime Minister of Pakistan Benazir Bhutto in the South Portico during the morning.
- June 7 – President Bush announces the nomination of Michael R. Deland for membership on the Council on Environmental Quality.
- June 8 – President Bush delivers an address to Ducks Unlimited members at the Sixth International Waterfowl Symposium of the Arlington Ballroom in Arlington during the afternoon. President Bush announces the nomination of Debra Russell Bowland for Administrator of the Wage and Hour Division at the Department of Labor.
- June 9 – President Bush announces the nomination of Thomas Patrick Melady for Ambassador Extraordinary and Plenipotentiary of the United States of America to the Holy See.
- June 13 – President Bush delivers a speech at University of Nebraska–Lincoln in the Bob Devaney Sports Center on the campus of the university during the afternoon. President Bush announces the nominations of Stella Garcia Guerra to be an Assistant Secretary of the Interior (Territorial and International Affairs), and John F. Turner for Director of the United States Fish and Wildlife Service at the Department of the Interior.
- June 14 – President Bush announces the continuation of Richard Schifter in his tenure as Assistant Secretary of State for Human Rights and Humanitarian Affairs.
- June 15 – President Bush delivers an address to law enforcement officers in the Federal Training Center in the Steed Building in Glynco, Georgia during the morning. President Bush attends the reception held for participants in the Very Special Arts International Festival on the South Portico during the afternoon.
- June 16 – President Bush announces the nomination of Stephen John Hadley to be an Assistant Secretary of Defense (International Security Policy).
- June 19 – President Bush attends the presentation ceremony for the Drug-Free Schools Awards in the Rose Garden during the morning.
- June 20 – President Bush attends the presentation ceremony for the Presidential Scholars Awards in the Rose Garden during the morning.
- June 21 – President Bush announces the Youth Engaged in Service to America Initiative on the South Lawn during the morning. President Bush announces the nomination of John J. Easton, Jr., to be an Assistant Secretary of Energy (International Affairs and Energy Emergencies).
- June 22 – President Bush speaks with Covenant House residents during the morning.

== July ==
- July 3 – President Bush releases a statement responding to the U.S. Supreme Court decision in Webster v. Reproductive Health Services, noting his favor of the court's choice but also conceding that the issue was one that would "stir strong feelings."
- July 4 – Press Secretary Fitzwater releases a statement on former President Reagan being examined after a riding accident in Mexico and President Bush's knowledge of the incident.
- July 5 – President Bush releases a statement in response to the Media Advertising Partnership for a Drug-Free America increasing its efforts in combating the usage of illegal drugs with its pledge to for an increase in donation advertising to $1,000,000. President Bush announces the nomination of Linda M. Combs for Assistant Secretary of the Treasury (Management).
- July 6 – President Bush attends the presentation ceremony for the Presidential Medal of Freedom in the East Room during the morning. President Bush announces the nomination of Eric M. Javits for Ambassador Extraordinary and Plenipotentiary of the United States of America to the Republic of Venezuela.
- July 7 – President Bush announces the nomination of Arthur W. Fort for the position of Assistant Secretary of State (Administration).
- July 10 – President Bush delivers an address to Polish National Assembly in the main chamber of the Parliament Building during the afternoon.
- July 11 – Secretary of Defense Cheney pledges an increase of civilian oversight in the purchasing of arms as well as trimming the people involved in purchasing decisions by thousands.
- July 12 – President Bush travels to Hungary to meet with prominent officials and give an address at Karl Marx University (now Corvinus University) in Budapest.
- July 13 – The Senate approves immigration legislation sponsored by Senators Alan Simpson and Ted Kennedy that creates categories that rank immigrants by their education and work experience. The Senate rejects bestowing more points to immigrants who speak English under the legislation.
- July 14 – Bush administration officials say the administration is preparing the offer of compensation for the families of the victims in the Iranian airliner that were shot down by the US Navy. In an 81 to 10 vote, the Senate approves the imposing of economic sanctions on China.
- July 16 – President Bush reports the Soviet economy as being worse than that of its western counterparts during a news conference.
- July 18 – President Bush addresses the novel Whose Broad Stripes and Bright Stars: The Trivial Pursuit of the Presidency, 1988 for the claim that Vice President Quayle was a lightweight during the campaign, stating his offense and citing Quayle's trips to Latin America as proof of his worth.
- July 19 – President Bush releases a statement on the elections in Nicaragua reflecting on the activities of the Sandinistas and outlining the goals the US has toward Nicaragua. President Bush announces the nomination of Nicolas Miklos Salgo for the position of Ambassador during his tenure as the Special Negotiator for Property Issues.
- July 21 – President Bush announces the nomination of Charles Warren Hostler for Ambassador Extraordinary and Plenipotentiary of the United States of America to the State of Bahrain.
- July 25 – President Bush announces a plan phasing out American steel quotas over the next two and a half years.
- July 26 – Fidel Castro says President Bush's trips to Poland and Hungary were "to encourage capitalist trends that have developed there and political problems that have come up there." The comments come during a speech Castro gave to commemorate the thirty-sixth anniversary of the start of the Cuban Revolution.
- July 28 – President Bush endorses Senator Pete Wilson for Governor of California in the state's gubernatorial election.
- July 30 – Secretary of State Baker asserts the US is opposed to the Khmer Rouge having any role in a possible Cambodian government while at an international conference.

== August ==
- August 1 – President Bush attends a White House barbecue with members of Congress on the South Lawn during the evening. President Bush announces the nomination of Jonathan Moore for the position of Alternate Representative of the United States of America for Special Political Affairs at the United Nations. In a statement, President Bush announces the United States "will provide additional support for the Polish people and the democratization process" during the 1990 fiscal year.
- August 2 – President Bush addresses the hostage situation in Lebanon while speaking to reporters in the Oval Office during the afternoon. Press Secretary Fitzwater releases a statement announcing that the Bush administration had come to "a consensus with key Senators from both parties on legislation that would expand the reach of this country's civil rights laws to include disabled Americans." President Bush announces the nomination of Stephen Read Hanmer, Jr. for deputy director of the United States Arms Control and Disarmament Agency.
- August 3 – In a letter to congressional leadership, President Bush notes his repeated urging of "Congress to act on legislation to resolve the crisis in the savings and loan industry" and reaffirms his commitment to finding a bipartisan solution.
- August 7 – President Bush attends a ceremony commemorating the bicentennial of the United States Department of War on Sommerall Field at Fort Myer in Arlington, Virginia during the morning. President Bush attends the Boy Scout National Jamboree in Bowling Green, Virginia where he delivers a speech recounting the first time he fished as a child.
- August 8 – President Bush addresses the National Urban League Conference at the Washington Convention Center during the afternoon.
- August 9 – President Bush signs the Financial Institutions Reform, Recovery, and Enforcement Act of 1989 into law during a morning appearance in the Rose Garden. President Bush says the legislation will address the issues of the savings and loan industry and "safeguard and stabilize America's financial system and put in place permanent reforms so these problems will never happen again." President Bush announces the continuation of John J. Welch, Jr. in his position as Assistant Secretary of the Air Force (Acquisition). President Bush signs H.J. Res. 281 into law. The joint resolution prohibits oil, gas, and mineral activities from taking place within the Cordell Bank National Marine Sanctuary.
- August 10 – President Bush announces the nomination of Colin Powell for Chairman of the Joint Chiefs of Staff during an afternoon joint appearance with Powell in the Rose Garden. President Bush releases a statement urging Americans to pray for the Lebanon hostages during the Sunday services some will attend over the upcoming weekend.
- August 11 – Press Secretary Fitzwater releases a statement confirming the education summit with American governors will be held from September 27–28 in Virginia.
- August 12 – President Bush releases a statement on the twenty-eighth anniversary of the Berlin Wall being erected stating the anniversary has created "renewed determination to overcome the division of Berlin and of Europe" and that the US is committed to assisting Berlin with gaining freedom and prosperity.
- August 13 – President Bush issues a statement on the plane crash death of Mickey Leland expressing his disappointment with no survivors being found aboard the aircraft and his condolences for Leland's family.
- August 14 – President Bush signs the Disaster Assistance Act of 1989 in the Roosevelt Room shortly before noon. Bush states that the legislation will provide relief with payments to compensate farmers affected by natural disasters. President Bush announces the nomination of Richard C. Breeden for membership on the Securities and Exchange Commission.
- August 15 – President Bush announces the nomination of James R. Locher III for Assistant Secretary of Defense (Special Operations and Low Intensity Conflict).
- August 16 – President Bush attends a fundraiser luncheon for Ileana Ros-Lehtinen in the ballroom at the Omni International Hotel in Miami, Florida during the afternoon.

== September ==
- September 18 – President Bush attends the Montana Centennial Celebration on the state capitol grounds. The speech delivered by the president reflects on the history of Montana and the advancements made in the state in the field of environmental policy.
- September 18 – President Bush delivers an address to the Five-State Legislators Conference in Helena, Montana in the house chamber of the state capitol.
- September 18 – President Bush holds his twenty-fourth news conference in the House of Representatives chamber of the Montana statehouse, answering questions from reporters on the subjects of Soviet Jews, wilderness areas, the Strategic Defense Initiative, arms control, the usage of American troops in the drug war, the war on drugs, terrorism, trade between the Soviets and the United States, German reunification, federal role in education, Yasser Arafat's visa request, the role of the federal government in education, the drug war in Colombia, the summit meeting between the Soviet Union and the US, and racial tensions.
- September 18 – President Bush announces the nomination of Richard H. Melton for Ambassador Extraordinary and Plenipotentiary of the United States of America to the Federative Republic of Brazil.
- September 18 – President Bush announces the appointment of Christine D. Reed for membership on the Board of Directors of the Federal National Mortgage Association.
- September 19 – President Bush attends the Washington Centennial Celebration in Riverfront Park. In his remarks, President Bush reflects on the history of the state and the changes made to the US in his first eight months as president.
- September 25 – President Bush announces the appointment of Robert J. Portman for Deputy Assistant to the President for Legislative Affairs.
- September 26 – President Bush announces the nomination of Edwin G. Foulke, Jr. for membership on the Occupational Safety and Health Review Commission.
- September 26 – In an afternoon Oval Office appearance, President Bush answers questions on capital gains taxes, chemical weapons, and the Education Summit.
- September 26 – President Bush transmits the Comprehensive Campaign Finance Reform Act of 1989, which he calls a representation of "comprehensive campaign finance reform legislation designed to reduce substantially the power of special economic interests while enhancing the role of individuals and political parties", to Congress in a message.
- September 27 – President Bush attends the annual meeting of the Boards of Governors of the International Monetary Fund and World Bank Group at the Sheraton Washington Hotel.
- September 27 – President Bush announces the nomination of Bruce L. Gardner for Assistant Secretary of Agriculture (Economics).
- September 28 – President Bush attends the University of Virginia Convocation at University Hall during the morning.
- September 29 – President Bush issues a memorandum on federal civilian employees affected by Hurricane Hugo, urging heads of departments and agencies to "consider their agency and OPM regulations and where appropriate excuse from duty, without charge to leave or loss of pay, any such employee who can be spared from duty and who is faced with a personal emergency because of the storm."
- September 29 – President Bush attends the retirement ceremony for Admiral William J. Crowe, Jr. at Worden Field at the U.S. Naval Academy.
- September 29 – President Bush signs the Energy and Water Development Appropriations Act, 1990 into law. President Bush praises Congress for sending the bill which he says will provide funding for the Superconducting Super Collider and atomic energy defense activities.
- September 29 – President Bush submits the Annual Report of the Railroad Retirement Board for Fiscal Year 1988 in a message to Congress.
- September 29 – President Bush announces the nomination of William Clark, Jr. for Ambassador Extraordinary and Plenipotentiary of the United States of America to India.
- September 29 – President Bush announces the continuation of the tenure of John C. Martin as Inspector General for the Environmental Protection Agency.
- September 29 – President Bush appoints John Charles Gartland to membership on the National Commission for Employment Policy.
- September 29 – President Bush announces the nomination of Dennis M. Devaney for membership on the National Labor Relations Board.

== October ==
- October 2 – President Bush announces the nomination of Keith Leveret Wauchope for Ambassador Extraordinary and Plenipotentiary of the United States of America to the Gabonese Republic.
- October 2 – President Bush announces the nomination of Gordon H. Mansfield for Assistant Secretary of Housing and Urban Development (Fair Housing and Equal Opportunity.
- October 3 – President Bush attends the welcoming ceremony for President of Mexico Carlos Salinas de Gortari at the South Portico.
- October 3 – President Bush signs H.R. 1529. The legislation establishes the Ulysses S. Grant National Historic Site in St. Louis, Missouri. In a statement, President Bush notes the life of Ulysses S. Grant as well as his own disappointment with Congress not accepting "the Department of the Interior's recommendation that performance of a formal new area study precede establishment of this Historic Site."
- October 3 – President Bush attends the signing ceremony for the Mexico-United States Environmental and Trade Agreements in the Roosevelt Room.
- October 6 – President Bush announces the nomination of Ruth V. Washington for Ambassador Extraordinary and Plenipotentiary of the United States of America to the Republic of The Gambia.
- October 6 – President Bush issues a memorandum on the 1990 census to the Secretary of the Commerce and Director of the Office of Personnel Management.
- October 6 – President Bush announces the nomination of Robert P. McMillan for membership on the Board of the Panama Canal Commission.
- October 6 – President Bush undergoes minor surgery at Walter Reed Army Hospital to "remove a mucoid cyst of approximately one centimeter in diameter from the third digit on the middle finger of his right hand."
- October 6 – President Bush insists his recent hand surgery was minor and defends the administration as it pertains to its policy toward Panama while in the Emergency Room at Walter Reed Army Medical Center.
- October 17 – President Bush announces the nomination of Don R. Clay for Assistant Administrator, Office of Solid Waste, of the Environmental Protection Agency.
- October 17 – President Bush attends the Republican Governors' Association Annual Dinner in the Presidential Ballroom of the Capital Hilton.
- October 18 – President Bush speaks with reporters on the San Francisco Bay Area earthquake in the Cabinet Room.
- October 18 – President Bush addresses the recipients of the National Distinguished Principals Award in Room 450 of the Old Executive Office Building.
- October 23 – President Bush announces the appointment of Frederick D. Nelson for Associate Counsel to the President.
- October 23 – President Bush appoints Christopher du Pont Roosevelt for membership on the part of the United States on the Roosevelt Campobello International Park Commission.
- October 24 – President Bush attends the presentation ceremony for the Excellence in Science and Math Teaching Awards in the Rose Garden.
- October 24 – President Bush announces the appointment of Charles R. Henry for membership as the Department of Defense member in the Committee for Purchase from the Blind and Other Severely Handicapped.
- October 25 – President Bush addresses members of the Institute of International Education in Room 450 of the Old Executive Office Building.
- October 26 – In an afternoon Cabinet Room appearance, President Bush announces "a major new initiative by our administration on food safety, a proposal to ensure that America's food supply remains the safest in the world."
- October 27 – President Bush sends the District of Columbia Appropriations Act, 1990 back to the House of Representatives in a message. President Bush explains his veto of the measure was due to it funding abortions that did not endanger the life of the mother and notes that he had outlined his intent to veto the bill should it contain the feature.
- October 27 – President Bush delivers remarks during a welcoming ceremony upon his arrival at Juan Santamaria International Airport.
- October 27 – President Bush answers questions from reporters on Nicaragua at the Hotel Cariari in San Jose.
- October 27 – President Bush announces the nominations of members for the Inter-American Development Bank.
- October 27 – President Bush announces the nomination of Edmund DeJarnette, Jr. for Ambassador Extraordinary and Plenipotentiary of the United States of America to the United Republic of Tanzania.
- October 28 – President Bush holds his twenty-sixth news conference in the Convention Hall at the Hotel Cariari in San Jose, Costa Rica. President Bush answers questions on Nicaragua, El Salvador, regional diplomacy, relations between United States and Latin America, nuclear cooperation on the part of Israel and South Africa, territories occupied by Israel, abortion, Panama, Andean Drug Summit and the war on drugs, and relations between Brazil and the United States.
- October 28 – President Bush delivers an address to community members of the American Embassy on the lawn of the American ambassador's residence.
- October 30 – President Bush transmits "the annual reports on activities under the Highway Safety Act (23 U.S.C. 401 note) and the National Traffic and Motor Vehicle Safety Act (15 U.S.C. 1408)" in a message to Congress.
- October 30 – President Bush attends the groundbreaking ceremony for the National Law Enforcement Officers' Memorial at Judiciary Square.
- October 30 – In a statement, President Bush says the construction of the chemical weapons destruction facility "says to all the world that the United States is determined to fulfill its promises, that our people and our government are committed to halting the spread of chemical weapons and eliminating their very existence."
- October 30 – President Bush transmits the Japan-United States Fishing Agreement to Congress in a message.
- October 30 – President Bush transmits the national emergency of Iran continuation in a message to Congress. President Bush recounts the history of the crisis between the US and Iran and states that he "determined that it is necessary to maintain in force the broad authorities that may be needed in the process of implementing the January 1981 agreements with Iran and in the eventual normalization of relations with that country."
- October 31 – President Bush attends the White House Halloween Party in the South Lawn.
- October 31 – President Bush transmits a report on the federal budget for the 1990 fiscal year in a message to Congress.
- October 31 – President Bush announces the appointment of Thomas F.X. Needles for Special Assistant to the President and associate director of Presidential Personnel.
- October 31 – President Bush announces the nomination of Hilary Paterson Cleveland for a United States Commissioner on the International Joint Commission—United States and Canada.
- October 31 – In a statement, President Bush announces "a minimum wage package consistent with the criteria I set forth in March of this year has been agreed to by the Republican and Democratic leadership in Congress and the leadership of organized labor."

== November ==
- November 2 – Congress negotiators agree to a defense budget of US$305 million which cuts US$1 billion from the Strategic Defense Initiative.
- November 3 – White House Press Secretary Marlin Fitzwater says the Bush administration will back Congress in a pay raise for top federal officials while in Norfolk, Virginia.
- November 15 – President Bush attends the unveiling ceremony for the official portraits of former President Reagan and former First Lady of the United States Nancy Reagan on the State Floor.
- November 15 – President Bush attends the Biannual Convention of the American Federation of Labor and Congress of Industrial Organizations in the Sheraton Washington Ballroom at the Sheraton Washington Hotel.
- November 19 – President Bush returns H.R. 2939 without his approval to the House of Representatives in a message. President Bush cites the inclusion of the Mikulski Amendment and other issues with provisions as his reasons for refusing to support the bill.
- November 20 – President Bush announces the nomination of Peter K. Nunez for Assistant Secretary of the Treasury for Enforcement and Tariff Affairs.
- November 20 – President Bush announces the nomination of William D. Hathaway for Federal Maritime Commissioner.
- November 21 – President Bush announces the nomination of Arthur J. Hill for President of the Government National Mortgage Association.
- November 22 – President Bush attends the Commercial Appeal's Thanksgiving Celebration on the front lawn of the Commercial Appeal in Memphis, Tennessee during the afternoon. President Bush announces the nomination of William James Haynes II for General Counsel of the Department of the Army.
- November 24 – US Ambassador William Walker says the only known witness to the slaying of six Jesuit priests the prior week was granted safe passage by the Bush administration.
- November 27 – President Bush announces his appointment of Peter W. Senopoulos for membership on the American Battle Monuments Commission.
- November 28 – President Bush delivers an address to members of the Presidential Economic Delegation to Poland at Blair House during the evening. President Bush signs the National Museum of the American Indian Act into law. President Bush signs the Support for East European Democracy (SEED) Act of 1989, an authorization of "8 million in assistance to promote democratization in Poland and Hungary" as well as provide other programs for the sake of promoting reform in both countries.
- November 29 – President Bush says it is too soon to cut defense spending during an interview in the Oval Office, saying "we are not in that posture." President Bush addresses his meeting with Prime Minister of Canada Brian Mulroney in the South Portico during the evening.
- November 30 – President Bush signs the Intelligence Authorization Act, Fiscal Year 1990 into law. President Bush says the legislation authorizes appropriations aligned with the Fiscal Year 1990 budget.
- November 30 – President Bush signs the Ethics Reform Act of 1989, which he states "important reforms that strengthen Federal ethical standards."

== December ==
- December 1 – President Bush orders US warplanes into Manila.
- December 2 – President Bush meets with Mikhail Gorbachev at a summit, Bush proposing the two collaborate on a strategic arms reduction treaty for another summit in six months.
- December 3 – Aboard the Maxim Gorky, a soviet ship, President Bush and Gorbachev have a joint news conference.
- December 4 – In Brussels, ahead of a NATO summit, President Bush talks with Prime Minister of Britain Margaret Thatcher and Prime Minister of Canada Brian Mulroney.
- December 7 – President Bush delivers a speech at the Acres Homes War on Drugs Rally in Houston, Texas.
- December 8 – President Bush states his wishes to attend a Colombia summit in spite of recent bombings.
- December 11 – President Bush says the trip to China taken by Brent Scowcroft and Lawrence Eagleburger was meant to brief Chinese officials on the Malta summit and that he is pleased with China's announcement earlier that day that China is not intending to sell Syria M-9 missiles. Bush also admits to a potential lack of funds in cleaning up the saving and loan disaster of the US from a 50 billion thrift bailout while speaking to editorial writers in Washington.
- December 11 – First Lady Barbara Bush unveils the Christmas decorations at the White House for the first time.
- December 12 – Secretary of State Baker visits East Germany, telling denizens there that the US supports the changes "taking place in this country." The White House announces the Bush administration's possible authorization of three telecommunication satellites to China following cancellation as a result of the Tiananmen Square bloody demonstrator crackdown. President Bush attends the Catholic University of America Anniversary Dinner at the Pension Building during the evening.
- December 13 – President Bush signs a repeal of the Medicare Catastrophic Coverage Act.
- December 14 – President Bush announces his nomination of Donald Robert Quartel for Federal Maritime Commissioner.
- December 15 – President Bush signs the Department of Housing and Urban Development Reform Act of 1989.
- December 16 – President Bush holds his thirtieth news conference in the Amiral Room at the Hotel L'Habitation de Lonvilliers with President of France François Mitterrand during the afternoon. The two answer questions from reporters on trade with countries in the east part of the world, the Middle East, relations between the US and Libya, the future of Haiti, terrorism, the war on drugs, the reunification of Germany, relations between the US and France, General Noriega, Romania, Lebanon, NATO, the American role in Europe, political and economic reforms worldwide, American defense spending, the European development bank, and China.
- December 18 – The White House discloses that President Bush sent National Security Advisor Scowcroft on a secret trip to China the past July for the purpose of informing Chinese officials of President Bush's shock in response to the June 4 Tiananmen Square violence. President Bush signs the Veterans' Benefits Amendments of 1989 into law, which is said to increase "certain benefits" allocated to veterans through payment. President Bush announces the appointment of Edward C. Aldridge, Jr. for membership on the President's National Security Telecommunications Advisory Committee.
- December 19 – Secretary of State Baker admits miscommunication on his part of when US officials first met with Beijing leadership after the Tiananmen Square massacre. President Bush signs the Omnibus Budget Reconciliation Act of 1989 into law. The law is said to have "significant deficit-reduction measures for fiscal year 1990".
- December 20 – President Bush delivers a televised address condemning military action by the United States in Panama.
- December 21 – President Bush holds what he calls his 30th as well as final of the year, insisting an "open-ended" commitment toward the continued deployment of American troops in Panama and tracking Manuel Antonio Noriega.
- December 22 – President Bush and First Lady Barbara Bush visit AIDs patients, the president commenting that some individuals are worried about contracting the disease through casual contact as part of their misinformation on how to acquire it.
- December 23 – President Bush moves 2,000 troops into Panama as reinforcements for US forces already there amid criticism the US is not moving quickly enough.
- December 26 – Press Secretary Fitzwater releases a statement saying President Bush is content with Panamanian people making "progress" in crafting a democracy as well as by the involvement of the US in the endeavor.
- December 27 – President Bush participates in a question and answer session with reporters in Corpus Christi, Texas.
- December 29 – Press Secretary Fitzwater says President Bush has issued "a warm message of congratulations" to Václav Havel in response to the latter being elected President of Czechoslovakia.
- December 30 – President Bush says the Panama-based US troops made a "screwup" two days prior when they searched the Panama residence of Antenor Ferrey.
- December 31 – President Bush talks with reporters in San Antonio, Texas, saying the administration is solving the problems in Noriega and that discussions and conversations will take place in the advancement of the US agenda there.

== See also ==
- Timeline of the George H. W. Bush presidency, for an index of the Bush presidency timeline articles

U.S. presidential administration timelines
Preceded by Reagan presidency (1988–1989)	Bush presidency (1989)	Succeeded by Bush presidency (1990)
