= Timeline of the George H. W. Bush presidency (1991) =

George H. W. Bush's presidency in 1991

The following is a timeline of the presidency of George H. W. Bush, from January 1, 1991 to December 31, 1991.

== January ==
- January 2 – President Bush announces his appointment of Katherine L. Super for Deputy Assistant to the President for Appointments and Scheduling at the White House.
- January 3 – President Bush announces the nominations of Arthur J. Hill for Assistant Secretary of Housing and Urban Development, and James F. Hoobler for Inspector General of the Small Business Administration.
- January 4 – President Bush answers questions on discussions between the United States and Iraq during an appearance on the South Lawn at the White House during the afternoon.
- January 7 – President Bush announces the nomination of George H. Pfau, Jr. for Director of the Securities Investor Protection Corporation.
- January 8 – President Bush announces the nomination of Stanford E. Parris for Administrator of the Saint Lawrence Seaway Development Corporation.
- January 9 – President Bush holds a news conference on the Persian Gulf Crisis in the Briefing Room at the White House during the afternoon. President Bush announces the nomination of Bernadine P. Healy for Director of the National Institutes of Health, Department of Health and Human Services.
- January 10 – President Bush announces the appointment of Raymond Ebeling for membership on the Advisory Commission on Conferences in Ocean Shipping.
- January 11 – President Bush announces his nomination of James Edward Denny for Assistant Commissioner of Patents and Trademarks at the Department of Commerce. President Bush sends a message to Congress on the subject of economic sanctions against Libya.
- January 12 – President Bush holds the sixty-ninth news conference of his presidency in the Briefing Room during the afternoon, the main topic being the Gulf War.
- January 13 – President Bush delivers an address on military involvement from the Soviet Union within Lithuania and answers questions during an afternoon South Lawn appearance.
- January 14 – President Bush signs the Authorization for Use of Military Force Against Iraq Resolution, stating his hope for the resolution to bring peace.
- January 16 – President Bush addresses the nation from the Oval Office on the beginning of US-Led Coalition forces strikes at the beginning of Operation Desert Storm.
- January 16 – Press Secretary Fitzwater announces President Bush's authorizing of United States Secretary of Energy James D. Watkins being able to "draw down and distribute the Strategic Petroleum Reserve (SPR) at such a rate as the Secretary may determine."
- January 17 – President Bush announces the nomination of Carol T. Crawford for membership on the United States International Trade Commission. President Bush speaks to reporters on the subject of the Persian Gulf conflict during a morning appearance in the Cabinet Room.
- January 18 – President Bush holds his seventieth news conference in the Briefing Room during the afternoon, addressing the Gulf War.
- January 21 – President Bush speaks on Iraq and the Soviet Union on the South Lawn during the morning.
- January 22 – President Bush sends a message to Congress regarding Bulgarian trade.
- January 23 – President Bush speaks to reporters in the East Room over details relating to his talks with President of Mongolia Punsalmaagiin Ochirbat during the afternoon.
- January 24 – President Bush answers questions from reporters on a Republican leadership meeting while in the Cabinet Room during the morning.
- January 25 – President Bush announces the nomination of Edward R. Madigan for United States Secretary of Agriculture and answers questions from reporters during an afternoon appearance in the Briefing Room.
- January 28 – President Bush delivers an address to the Annual Convention of the National Religious Broadcasters in the ballroom of the Sheraton Washington Hotel during the morning.
- January 29 – President Bush delivers his annual State of the Union Address before a joint session of Congress.
- January 30 – President Bush announces the nominations of Robert B. Zoellick for Under Secretary of State for Economic and Agricultural Affairs, and Katherine Shirley for Ambassador Extraordinary and Plenipotentiary of the United States of America to the Republic of Senegal. President Bush announces the appointment of Edward O. Vetter for membership on the Competitiveness Policy Council.
- January 31 – President Bush attends the National Prayer Breakfast in the International Ballroom at the Washington Hilton Hotel during the morning. President Bush delivers an address on his administration's policy toward the controlling of drugs in Room 450 of the Old Executive Office Building during the afternoon.

== February ==
- February 1 – President Bush delivers an address at the Cherry Point Marine Corps Air Station in North Carolina during the morning.
- February 4 – President Bush gives a speech to the National Governors' Association in the East Room during the morning. President Bush submits a message to Congress in regards to the fiscal budget for the following year.
- February 5 – President Bush holds his seventy-first news conference, concerning the Soviet Union and the Gulf War, in the Briefing Room during the morning. President Bush announces the nomination of Rockwell A. Schnabel for United States Deputy Secretary of Commerce.
- February 6 – President Bush signs the Agent Orange Act of 1991 into law, stating the legislation will use science "to settle the troubling questions concerning the effect on veterans of exposure to herbicides -- such as Agent Orange -- used during the Vietnam era."
- February 8 – President Bush answers questions from reporters on the Gulf War in the Oval Office during the afternoon.
- February 11 – President Bush delivers an address on the Gulf War in the Rose Garden during the afternoon.
- February 12 – President Bush announces the nomination of Catherine Yi-yu Cho Woo for membership on the National Council on the Arts.
- February 13 – President Bush announces the nomination of John G. Keller, Jr. for United States Under Secretary of Commerce for Travel and Tourism.
- February 14 – President Bush announces the appointment of John Kenneth Blackwell for the Representative of the United States on the Human Rights Commission of the Economic and Social Council of the United Nations.
- February 15 – President Bush delivers an address to the American Association for the Advancement of Science in Room 450 of the Old Executive Office Building during the morning. President Bush gives a speech to employees of the Raytheon Missile Systems Plant in Andover, Massachusetts during the afternoon.
- February 19 – President Bush answers questions from reporters on the Gulf War during a morning appearance in the Cabinet Room.
- February 20 – President Bush attends a welcoming ceremony for Margrethe II of Denmark in the South Portico during the morning. President Bush delivers an address on the energy policies of his administration in Room 450 of the Old Executive Office Building during the afternoon.
- February 21 – President Bush signs the proclamation for the designation of National Parents and Teachers Association Week in the Roosevelt Room during the afternoon.
- February 22 – Lynn Morley Martin is sworn in as United States Secretary of Labor in the Great Hall at the Department of Labor during the morning.
- February 23 – In an evening Briefing Room appearance, President Bush announces his authorization of General Norman Schwarzkopf "to use all forces available including ground forces to eject the Iraqi army from Kuwait."
- February 25 – President Bush announces the nomination of Dennis A. Yao for Federal Trade Commissioner.
- February 27 – President Bush announces the Gulf War has ended, citing the liberation of Kuwait and the defeat of the Iraq army, in a televised address.
- February 28 – President Bush delivers an address and answers questions from reporters on the subject of the Gulf War during an afternoon joint appearance with Kuwait Ambassador to the United States Saud Nasser Al-Saud Al-Sabah in the Oval Office.

== March ==
- March 1 – President Bush gives a speech to the American Legislative Exchange Council in Room 450 of the Old Executive Office Building during the morning. President Bush signs a proclamation in commemoration of the thirtieth anniversary of the Peace Corps in the Roosevelt Room during the morning. President Bush holds his seventy-second news conference and addresses the aftermath of the Gulf War in the Briefing Room during the afternoon. President Bush transmits a report to Congress concerning trade negotiations as well as agreements.
- March 4 – President Bush delivers an address on foreign policy to Veterans Service Organizations while in Room 450 of the Old Executive Office Building during the afternoon. President Bush delivers an address on the fiftieth anniversary of the Westinghouse Science Talent Search in the International Ballroom of the Washington Hilton Hotel during the evening. President Bush announces the nomination of Donald Jay Yockey for Under Secretary of Defense for Acquisition.
- March 5 – President Bush attends a briefing on extending Fast track in Room 450 of the Old Executive Office Building during the morning. In his address, President Bush touts the benefits of the extension and advocates opposing the measure. President Bush makes a joint appearance in the Oval Office with Minister of Foreign Affairs of Spain Francisco Fernández Ordóñez during the afternoon.
- March 6 – President Bush delivers an address to a joint session of Congress on the ending of the Gulf War that also outlines how the conflict has affected the administration's policies in the House Chamber during the evening.
- March 7 – President Bush announces the appointment of Judy Smith as Special Assistant to the President and Deputy Press Secretary. President Bush presents former Prime Minister of the United Kingdom Margaret Thatcher with the Presidential Medal of Freedom in the East Room during an afternoon ceremony.
- March 8 – President Bush releases a memorandum to executive departments and agencies on Desert Shield participants returning to federal civilian employment. President Bush sends a message to Congress on terminated "imposed with respect to" Kuwait.
- March 10 – President Bush delivers an address on the stage at Ford's Theatre Gala during the evening.
- March 11 – President Bush gives a speech promoting crime control legislation proposals by his administration during a morning appearance in the East Room. President Bush attends a presentation ceremony for the Point of Light Award at Henderson Hall/Barcroft Elementary School in Arlington, Virginia during the afternoon.
- March 12 – Edward R. Madigan is sworn in as the 24th United States Secretary of Agriculture in the Patio at the Agriculture Building during the morning.
- March 13 – President Bush holds his seventy-third news conference with Prime Minister of Canada Brian Mulroney in the Reading Room at Parliament Hill during the afternoon.
- March 14 – President Bush holds his seventy-fourth news conference in the Bougainvillier Room at the Hotel Meridien with President of France François Mitterrand during the afternoon.
- March 15 – President Bush announces the nomination of William G. Curran, Jr. for United States Director of the European Bank for Reconstruction and Development at the Department of Treasury.
- March 18 – President Bush receives the Elie Wiesel Foundation Humanitarian Award during a joint appearance with Elie Wiesel in the morning.
- March 19 – President Bush delivers a speech to the Points of Light Foundation in Room 450 of the Old Executive Office Building during the afternoon.
- March 21 – President Bush addresses policy brutality and questions from reporters in the Cabinet Room during the afternoon.
- March 22 – President Bush announces the nomination of David T. Kearns for United States Deputy Secretary of Education.
- March 23 – President Bush delivers an address in the Presidential Ballroom at the Capital Hilton Hotel during the evening.
- March 25 – President Bush signs a proclamation that issues Greek Independence Day during a morning appearance in the Roosevelt Room.
- March 26 – President Bush speaks favorably of Germany in the aftermath of its contributions to Desert Storm and answers questions from reporters in the Oval Office during the afternoon.
- March 27 – President Bush gives a speech in the Dean Acheson Room at the State Department during the afternoon.
- March 29 – President Bush issues a statement on the death of Lee Atwater.

== April ==
- April 2 – President Bush announces the nomination of John Schrote for Assistant Secretary of the Interior for Policy, Management and Budget.
- April 3 – President Bush answers questions from reporters in regards to the administration's foreign policy while at the Jupiter Hills Country City Golf Course in Hobe Sound, Florida during the afternoon.

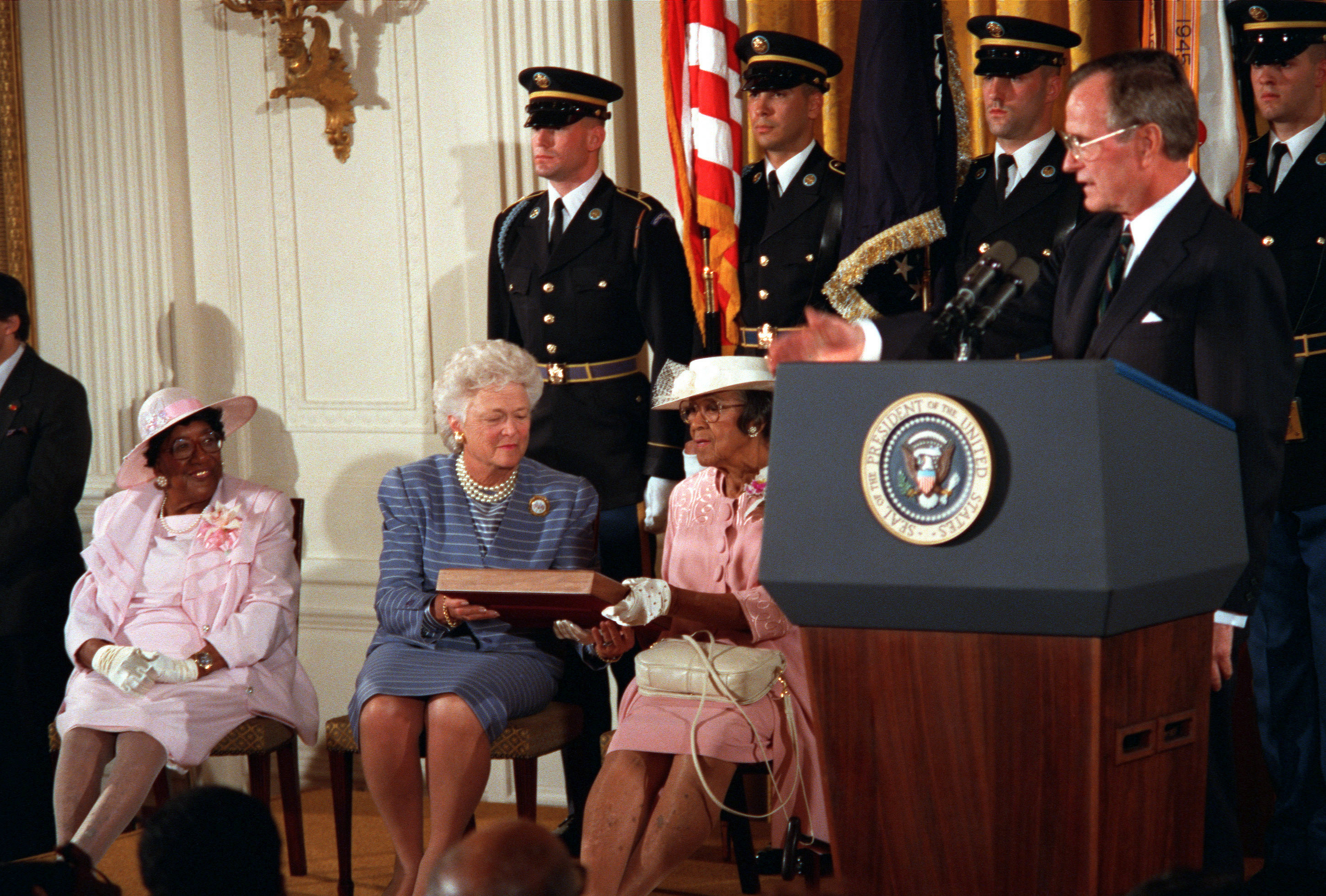
President Bush at the posthumous presentation of the Medal of Honor of Corporal (CPL) Freddie Stowers, April 4, 1991

- April 4 – President Bush holds his seventy-seventh news conference with Prime Minister of Japan Toshiki Kaifu during a morning appearance in Ballroom A of the Four Seasons Hotel in Newport Beach, California. The questions are strictly aimed toward the Bush administration's foreign policy. President Bush announces the appointment of Douglas H. Paal for Special Assistant to the President for National Security Affairs.
- April 5 – President Bush meets with Hispanic business owners at the Four Seasons Hotel to better relations between the United States and Mexico during the afternoon. Bush then answers inquiries into the administration's foreign policy by reporters. President Bush releases a statement in response to the death of John Tower.
- April 6 – President Bush holds his seventy-eight press conference on the grounds of the Houstonian Hotel during the afternoon. Bush and United States Secretary of State James Baker answer questions on the administration's foreign policy. President Bush signs the Persian Gulf Conflict Supplemental Authorization and Personnel Benefits Act of 1991. Bush states it authorizes "appropriations that the Administration requested for Operations Desert Shield and Desert Storm" alongside benefits for service members who served during the Gulf War.
- April 7 – President Bush delivers an address in commemoration of the National Day of Thanksgiving in the main sanctuary of St. Martin's Episcopal Church during the morning.
- April 8 – President Bush attends a gathering for the commemoration of the fiftieth anniversary of the Dallas Naval Air Station as well as presentation of the Point of Life Award to the volunteers of the Voice of Hope Ministries the tarmac in front of the Dallas Naval Air Station Operations Building during the afternoon.
- April 9 – President Bush delivers an address to business leaders on Fast Track extension in the Cabinet Room during the afternoon. President Bush gives a speech to the American Business Conference meeting in the Great Hall at the Department of Commerce during the afternoon.
- April 10 – President Bush attends the presentation ceremony for the National Teacher of the Year Award at Slanesville Elementary School in Slanesville, West Virginia during the morning. President Bush announces the appointment of C. Gregg Petersmeyer for Assistant to the President and Director of the Office of National Service. President Bush signs the Operation Desert Shield/Desert Storm Supplemental Appropriations Act, 1991, meant "to provide funds to pay the costs of Operation Desert Shield/Desert Storm."
- April 11 – President Bush announces the nomination of Preston Moore for Chief Financial Officer of the Department of Commerce.
- April 12 – President Bush announces the nomination of Charles R. Bowers for Ambassador Extraordinary and Plenipotentiary of the United States of America to the Republic of Bolivia.
- April 13 – President Bush delivers an address in the fuel cell hangar at Maxwell Air Force Base War College in Montgomery, Alabama during the morning.
- April 15 – President Bush attends a briefing of the Associated General Contractors of America in Room 450 of the Old Executive Office Building during the morning. President Bush addresses the National Association of Broadcasters Convention in Room 459 of the Old Executive Office Building during the afternoon.

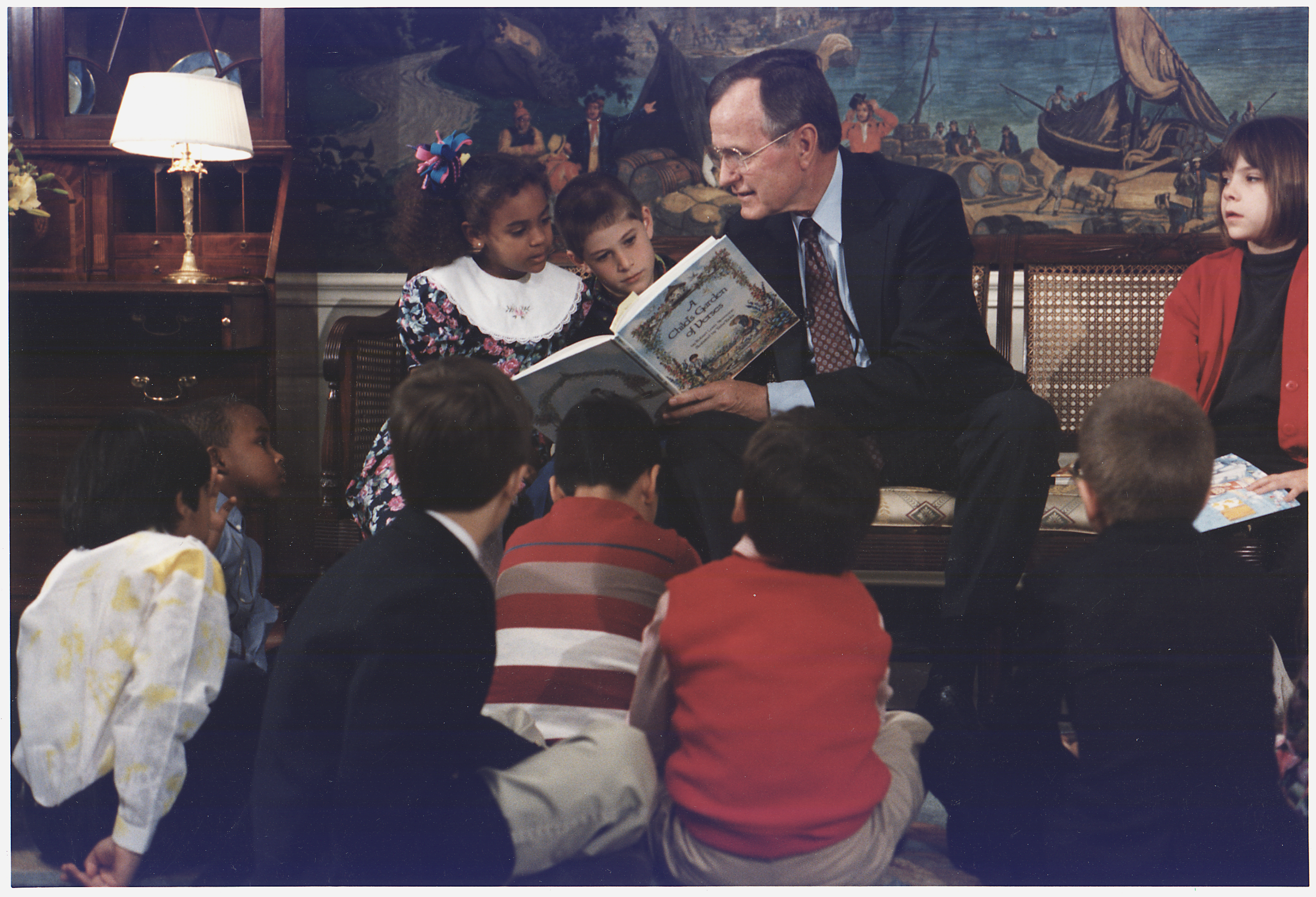
President Bush reads a book to children during Great American Read Aloud Day in the Diplomatic Reception Room, April 16, 1991

- April 16 – President Bush transmits the Czech and Slovak Federal Republic-United States Nuclear Energy Cooperation Agreement in a report to Congress. President Bush holds his eightieth news conference in the Briefing Room during the afternoon, answering questions from reporters on the administration's foreign policy.
- April 17 – President Bush attends the welcoming ceremony for President of Nicaragua Violeta Chamorro at the South Portico during the morning. President Bush announces the nomination of Gordon R. Sullivan to be Chief of Staff of the United States Army.
- April 18 – President Bush announces the nomination of Mary Ann Casey for Ambassador Extraordinary and Plenipotentiary of the United States of America to the Democratic and Popular Republic of Algeria. President Bush delivers an address on the administration's nationwide education policy during an afternoon appearance in the East Room.
- April 19 – President Bush announces the appointment of Gary L. Foster for Special Assistant to the President and Deputy Press Secretary.
- April 22 – President Bush attends the John F. Kennedy Center for the Performing Arts Musicale Reception in the East Room during the evening. President Bush announces the nomination of Carl E. Mundy, Jr. for Commandant of the U.S. Marine Corps.
- April 23 – President Bush attends the presentation ceremony for the Point of Light Award in Bancroft Hall at the United States Naval Academy during the afternoon.
- April 24 – President Bush announces the nomination of Nancy Patricia Dorn for Assistant Secretary of the Army for Civil Works in the Defense Department. President Bush delivers an address to the National Summit on Mathematics Assessment in the auditorium of the National Academy of Sciences during the afternoon.
- April 25 – President Bush delivers remarks to the United States Academic Decathlon Winners in the Rose Garden during the morning.
- April 26 – President Bush announces the nominations of John Thomas McCarthy for Ambassador Extraordinary and Plenipotentiary to the Republic of Tunisia, and Nicholas Platt for Ambassador Extraordinary and Plenipotentiary to the Islamic Republic of Pakistan.
- April 29 – President Bush answers questions while making a joint appearance in the Roosevelt Room with the National Association of Farm Broadcasters during the afternoon.
- April 30 – President Bush announces the nomination of Gordon S. Brown for Ambassador Extraordinary and Plenipotentiary to the Islamic Republic of Mauritania.

== May ==
- May 1 – President Bush delivers an address on National Physical Fitness and Sports Month in the South Lawn during the morning. President Bush holds an afternoon meeting with the Society of Business Editors and Writers in the Ballroom at the Washington Marriott Hotel. Bush delivers an address and answers questions while attending. President Bush attends a briefing on the extension of the Fast Track Authority in Room 450 of the Old Executive Office Building during the afternoon.
- May 2 – President Bush announces the nomination of Sally G. Cowal for Ambassador Extraordinary and Plenipotentiary of the United States of America to the Republic of Trinidad and Tobago.
- May 3 – President Bush delivers an address at Cochran Gardens Community Center in St. Louis, Missouri during the afternoon.
- May 4 – President Bush delivers an address at the University of Michigan in Ann Arbor, Michigan during the morning. President Bush suffers irregular heartbeat during a jog. Stays in hospital for a few days. Diagnosed with Graves' disease.
- May 6 – President Bush answers questions from reporters on the subjects of his health and Vice President Quayle in the Rose Garden during the morning.
- May 7 – President Bush confirms his health is back to normal when asked by a reporter during a morning appearance in the Cabinet Room. President Bush attends the Small Business Person of the Year Award ceremony in the Rose Garden during the morning. He delivers an address and answers questions.
- May 8 – President Bush holds his eighty-first news conference in the Briefing Room during the morning. President Bush announces the resignation of William H. Webster as Director of the Central Intelligence Agency and answers questions relating to his domestic and foreign policies as well as his re-election bid.
- May 9 – President Bush announces the nomination of Robert H. Pelletreau, Jr. for Ambassador Extraordinary and Plenipotentiary to the Arab Republic of Egypt.
- May 10 – President Bush attends the Social Sciences Complex dedication ceremony at Princeton University in Princeton, New Jersey during the morning.
- May 12 – President Bush delivers an address at Hampton University at Armstrong Field in Hampton, Virginia during the morning.
- May 14 – President Bush holds his eighty-second news conference in the Briefing Room during the morning. President Bush announces the nomination of Robert M. Gates for Director of the Central Intelligence Agency and answers questions ranging from inquiries into Gates' nomination to the administration's foreign policy.
- May 14 – President Bush and First Lady Barbara Bush welcome Queen Elizabeth II and Prince Philip, Duke of Edinburgh to the White House.
- May 15 – President Bush delivers an address on the administration's domestic policy in Room S – 207 at the U.S. Capitol during the afternoon. President Bush answers questions from reporters on foreign policy in the South Lawn during the afternoon. President Bush announces the nominations of Morris D. Busby for Ambassador Extraordinary and Plenipotentiary of the United States of America to the Republic of Colombia, and Johnnie Carson for Ambassador Extraordinary and Plenipotentiary of the United States of America to the Republic of Uganda.
- May 17 – President Bush transmits a message to the Senate on the subject of the Basel Convention on the Control of Transboundary Movements of Hazardous Wastes and Their Disposal.
- May 20 – President Bush holds his eighty-third news conference with Chancellor of Germany Helmut Kohl in the Rose Garden during the evening. President Bush answers questions from reporters on the administration's foreign policy.
- May 21 – President Bush announces the nomination of Robert Michael Guttman for Assistant Secretary of Labor for Labor Management Standards.
- May 23 – President Bush delivers an address to the National Retail Federation in Room 450 of the Old Executive Office Building during the morning.
- May 24 – President Bush signs the Niobrara Scenic River Designation Act of 1991 into law, imposing a designation of "three segments of the Niobrara River and one segment of the Missouri River in Nebraska and South Dakota as 'instant' components of the National Wild and Scenic Rivers System without the benefit of a formal study."
- May 27 – President Bush attends the commencement ceremony for Yale University in New Haven, Connecticut during the morning.
- May 28 – President Bush holds his eighty-fifth news conference in Cape Arundel Golf Course in Kennebunkport, Maine during the morning. He answers questions on his health and the administration's foreign policy.

== June ==
- June 1 – President Bush attends the commencement ceremony for the United States Military Academy at Michie Stadium in West Point, New York during the morning, delivering a speech. President Bush answers questions on relations between the United States and the Soviet Union posed to him by reporters aboard Air Force One during the afternoon.
- June 3 – President Bush delivers an address to the National Federation of Independent Business in the Regency Ballroom at the Capitol Hill Hyatt Regency during the afternoon. President Bush gives a speech to the National Education Goals Panel at the Grand Hyatt Hotel during the afternoon. President Bush gives an education address in the Indian Treaty Room of the Old Executive Office Building during the afternoon.
- June 4 – President Bush announces the sixteen fellows composing the 1991–1992 White House Fellows appointments.
- June 5 – President Bush meets with Prime Minister of Mauritius Anerood Jugnauth in the Oval Office. President Bush and Prime Minister Jugnauth appear jointly in the South Portico during the afternoon. President Bush announces the nomination of Steven I. Hofman for Assistant Secretary of Labor for Public Affairs. President Bush submits a message to Congress for the transfer of the District of Columbia Government's 1992 budget request and 1991 budget supplemental request.
- June 6 – President Bush delivers an address to the Annual Southern Baptist Convention in the Georgia World Congress Center during the morning. President Bush announces the nomination of Desiree Tucker-Sorini for Assistant Secretary of the Treasury for Public Affairs and Liaison.
- June 7 – Henry Catto is sworn in as Director of the United States Information Agency in the Voice of America Auditorium during the morning. President Bush delivers remarks prior to the swearing-in. President Bush announces the nomination of Richard W. Carlson for Ambassador Extraordinary and Plenipotentiary to the Republic of Seychelles.
- June 8 – President Bush attends a memorial ceremony for those killed during the Gulf War in the amphitheater at Arlington National Cemetery during the morning. President Bush delivers an address.
- June 11 – President Bush attends the commencement ceremony for James H. Groves Adult High School in the high school's auditorium in Seaford, Delaware during the afternoon. President Bush announces the appointments of Gary J. Andres for Deputy Assistant to the President for Legislative Affairs (House), and Arnold I. Havens for Special Assistant to the President for Legislative Affairs (House). President Bush delivers an address in Hangar 3 at the base of Andrews Air Force Base in Maryland during the afternoon.
- June 12 – President Bush answers questions from reporters on President of El Salvador Alfredo Cristiani, foreign policy, and his birthday in the Oval Office during the morning. President Bush delivers an address on the administration's domestic policy in the South Lawn during the evening. President Bush announces the nomination of Christopher W. S. Ross for Ambassador Extraordinary and Plenipotentiary of the United States of America to the Syrian Arab Republic.
- June 13 – President Bush delivers an address on Childhood Immunization in the Rose Garden during the morning. President Bush attends the groundbreaking ceremony for the Hospital for Sick Children during the morning. President Bush signs a proclamation designating the following day as " Baltic Freedom Day" in the Roosevelt Room during the afternoon. President Bush gives a speech to the Annual Republican Congressional Fundraising Dinner in Hall A at the Washington Convention Center during the evening.
- June 14 – President Bush answers questions from reporters on the subject of the administration's foreign policy, his California trip, and civil rights legislation while aboard Air Force One during the morning. President Bush attends the commencement ceremony for the California Institute of Technology in Pasadena, California during the morning.
- June 16 – President Bush attends the Simon Wiesenthal Center Dinner in the Los Angeles Ballroom at the Century Plaza Hotel in Los Angeles, California during the evening. President Bush gives a speech during an appearance at Mile Square Park in Fountain Valley, California during the afternoon. President Bush announces the appointment of Clayton S. Fong for Deputy Director of the Office of Consumer Affairs at the Department of Health and Human Services.
- June 17 – President Bush answers questions from reporters on relations between the United States and Soviet Union and South Africa while aboard Air Force One during the morning. President Bush delivers an address in the Mesa County Courthouse in Grand Junction, Colorado during the afternoon.
- June 18 – President Bush attends a briefing on crime legislation in Room 450 of the Old Executive Office Building during the afternoon. President Bush attends the state dinner for President of Brazil Fernando Collor de Mello in the State Dining Room during the evening.
- June 19 – President Bush answers questions from reporters on White House Chief of Staff John H. Sununu and civil rights legislation while in the Cabinet Room during the morning. President Bush attends the presentation ceremony for the Presidential Scholars Awards in the South Lawn of the White House during the afternoon.
- June 20 – President Bush and National Security Advisor Brent Scowcroft meet with former Prime Minister Thatcher for an hour for a discussion on the Soviet Union. President Bush meets with Chief Minister of KwaZulu Mangosuthu Buthelezi in the Oval Office for talks on the development of South Africa. President Bush and Chief Minister KwaZulu address the contents of their meeting in the South Portico during the afternoon.
- June 21 – President Bush delivers an address to the American Association of State Highway and Transportation Officials in the Rose Garden during the morning. President Bush speaks with President of the Soviet Union Mikhail Gorbachev by telephone on the current state of the Soviet Union. Press Secretary Fitzwater releases a statement on the content of the discussion. President Bush announces the nomination of Frank G. Wisner for Ambassador Extraordinary and Plenipotentiary of the United States of America to the Republic of the Philippines. President Bush submits a message to Congress transmitting a report on the nationwide emergency relating to chemical and biological weapon proliferation.
- June 25 – President Bush delivers an address at a luncheon with federal law enforcement agencies in the Roosevelt Room during the afternoon. President Bush announces the nomination of Diane S. Ravitch for Assistant Secretary for Educational Research and Improvement at the Department of Education.
- June 27 – President Bush attends the unveiling ceremony for his official presidential bust in the Rotunda at the Capitol during the afternoon. President Bush delivers an address and answers questions from reporters at a ceremony in the Rose Garden commemorating the anniversary of the Enterprise for the Americas Initiative during the afternoon. President Bush announces the nomination of Olin L. Wethington for Deputy Under Secretary of the Treasury for International Affairs. President Bush signs the Education Council Act of 1991, legislation geared toward fulfilling aspects of his America 2000 education reform strategy with the establishment of a National Commission on Time and Learning and a National Council on Education Standards and Testing.
- June 28 – President Bush answers questions on his Supreme Court nominee from reporters while aboard Air Force One during the afternoon. President Bush announces the nominations of Nancy Risque Rohrbach and Cari M. Dominguez for Assistant Secretaries of Labor for Employment Standards Administration at the Department of Labor.

== July ==
- July 1 – President Bush holds his eighty-sixth news conference at Walker's Point during the afternoon. Bush announces his nomination of Clarence Thomas for Associate Justice of the United States Supreme Court and answers questions on the nomination and the administration's foreign policy.
- July 2 – President Bush attends the welcoming ceremony for President of South Korea Roh Tae-woo in the South Portico during the morning. President Bush and President Roh deliver addresses at the State Dining Room reception for Roh during the evening.
- July 3 – President Bush attends the presentation ceremony for the Presidential Medals of Freedom and Presidential Citizen's Medals in the East Room during the morning. President Bush attends the dedication ceremony for the Mount Rushmore National Memorial in South Dakota during the afternoon.
- July 4 – President Bush delivers an address on the Webster County Courthouse lawn commemorating Independence Day during the morning. President Bush gives a speech commemorating Independence Day on the parade route in front of the City Council Building in Grand Rapids, Michigan during the afternoon.
- July 9 – President Bush delivers an address to the American Defense Preparedness Association in the Grand Ballroom at the J.W. Marriott Hotel during the morning. President Bush attends the presentation ceremony for the National Medal of the Arts in the East Room shortly after noon.
- July 10 – President Bush holds his eighty-eight news conference in the Briefing Room during the afternoon. Bush answers questions on his nominations, South Africa, Iraq, abortion, and civil rights. President Bush holds his eighty-ninth news conference in the Briefing Room during the afternoon. Bush starts the news conference off with an announcement of the nomination of Alan Greenspan for another term as Chair of the Federal Reserve and for the Federal Reserve Board of Governors. President Bush delivers an address to the White House Conference on Library and Information Services in Hall A of the Washington Convention Center during the afternoon.
- July 11 – President Bush and Minister of Foreign Affairs of the Soviet Union Alexander Bessmertnykh make a joint appearance in the Oval Office during the morning.
- July 12 – President Bush answers questions from reporters on Japan, the Central Intelligence Agency Director and Supreme Court nominations, talks of arms reduction, an alleged deal during the Iran hostage crisis, and the Soviet Union on the lawn of the President's residence at Walker's Point in Kennebunkport, Maine during the morning. The White House releases a statement on the subject of the Trade Enhancement Initiative for Central and Eastern Europe.
- July 14 – President Bush holds his ninety-first news conference with President of France François Mitterrand on the lawn of Chateau de Rambouillet in Rambouillet, France during the evening. Bush answers questions on achieving peace in the Middle East, Iraq, the Soviet Union, and aiding emerging democracies. President Bush attends the presentation ceremony for the Declaration of the Legion of Merit, Degree of Chief Commander to Sir Peter de la Billiere in the Pilliared Room of No. 10 Downing Street during the evening.
- July 15 – President Bush answers questions on discussions of peace within the Middle East, negotiations on START I, the London Economic Summit, and Iraq from reporters at the Winfield House in London, United Kingdom during the morning. Press Secretary Fitzwater releases a statement on the administration's involvement in Middle East peace discussions at the Hilton Hotel in London during the afternoon.
- July 16 – The London Economic Summit releases a declaration over conventional arms transfers and nuclear, biological, and chemical weapons. President Bush announces the nomination of Sylvia Chavez Long for Assistant Secretary of Veterans Affairs for Congressional Affairs at the Department of Veterans Affairs.
- July 17 – President Bush holds his ninety-second news conference with Soviet Union President Gorbachev in the garden of Winfield House in London during the afternoon. The two presidents speak on relations between their countries and answer questions from reporters.
- July 18 – President Bush gives a speech to the Greek Parliament in Athens, Greece in the Greek Parliament building during the afternoon. President Bush holds his ninety-fourth news conference with Prime Minister of Greece Konstantinos Mitsotakis on the patio of the Prime Minister's office during the evening. President Bush answers questions on Balkan, the Soviet Union, Iraq, Turkey, and Greece.
- July 19 – President Bush delivers an address to the Greek-American Chamber of Commerce Breakfast in the ballroom of the Intercontinental Hotel in Athens, Greece during the morning. President Bush delivers an address to United States and Greek Armed Forces at the Souda Bay naval facility in Souda Bay, Crete during the afternoon.
- July 20 – President Bush delivers remarks after arriving at Esenboga Airport in Ankara, Turkey during the morning. President Bush holds his ninety-fifth news conference with President of Turkey Turgut Özal on the front landing of the Presidential Palace in Ankara during the afternoon. The two presidents answer questions on Turkey, Iraq, Cyprus, the New World Order, and the creation of peace in the Middle East. President Bush delivers an address at a state dinner in Ankara while in the garden of the Presidential Palace during the evening.
- July 21 – Presidents Bush and Özal answer questions on their respective foreign policies from reporters aboard Air Force One. President Bush announces the nomination of Richard Clark Barkley for Ambassador Extraordinary and Plenipotentiary of the United States of America to the Republic of Turkey.
- July 22 – President Bush delivers an address at Atatürk Airport during a morning departure ceremony to conclude his trip to Turkey. Press Secretary Fitzwater reads a statement confirming that President Bush had earlier in the day created "a Bulgarian-American Agriculture/Agribusiness Enterprise Fund."
- July 23 – President Bush answers questions from reporters on the Iraq oil sales and Chinese trade while in the Cabinet Room during the morning. President Bush attends the presentation ceremony for the Take Pride in America Awards in the East Room during the afternoon.
- July 24 – President Bush addresses reporters on his nominations to the Supreme Court and for CIA Director in the Cabinet Room during the morning. President Bush answers questions from reporters on South Africa in the Oval Office during the morning. President Bush and President of Zimbabwe Robert Mugabe deliver remarks in the South Lawn during the afternoon.
- July 25 – President Bush delivers an address at the Antiochian Orthodox Christian Church Annual Convention in the Arlington Room of the Crystal Gateway Marriott Hotel in Arlington, Virginia during the morning. President Bush signs the National Literacy Act of 1991 in the Roosevelt Room during the afternoon. Bush states that the bill is national and "our first major step toward a fully literate America". President Bush announces the George Edward Moose for Deputy Representative of the United States of America in the Security Council of the United Nations with an ambassador ranking.
- July 26 – President Bush issues a memorandum addressing Americans with disabilities having access to federal programs and employment. President Bush delivers an address commemorating the anniversary of the Americans with Disabilities Act of 1990 signing in the Rose Garden during the morning.
- July 30 – President Bush attends the arrival ceremony for his visit to Russia in St. George's Hall at the Kremlin during the morning. President Bush transmits the Regional Agreement for the Use of the Band 1605 – 1705 kHz in Region 2 in a message to the Senate.

== August ==
- August 1 – President Bush attends the arrival ceremony for his visit to the Soviet Union at the Borispol Airport in Kiev during the afternoon. President Bush delivers an address to the Supreme Soviet of the Republic of Ukraine in Session Hall of the Supreme Soviet Building during the afternoon.
- August 2 – President Bush announces the nomination of B. Robert Okun for Assistant Secretary for Legislation and Congressional Affairs. President Bush issues a memorandum on the Soviet Union. President Bush holds his ninety-seventh news conference in the Rose Garden during the afternoon. President Bush answers questions on HIV as well as other domestic issues, his re-election campaign and health, Latin America, and civil rights.
- August 5 – President Bush releases a statement on Clarence Thomas's ongoing nomination, expressing his confidence in the latter being confirmed following Senate hearings.
- August 6 – President Bush attends the kickoff ceremony for the Eighth Annual National Night Out Against Crime in the Auditorium at the Drug Enforcement Administration during the morning. Press Secretary Fitzwater releases a statement on President Bush's sending of the U.S.-Soviet trade agreement to Congress for approval four days prior. President Bush answers questions from reporters on hostages, the Middle East Peace Conference, the resignation of L. William Seidman, and the Iran-contra investigation while aboard Air Force One.
- August 7 – Press Secretary Fitzwater releases a statement expressing the administration's confidence in Clarence Thomas being confirmed as well as qualifications to serve on the court.
- August 8 – Press Secretary Fitzwater releases a statement on President Bush being satisfied with the release of British hostage John McCarthy from Lebanon captors.
- August 11 – President Bush delivers a speech on the release of American hostage Edward Tracy and answers questions relating to the matter including how it affects the administration's foreign policy while at his home. Press Secretary Fitzwater releases a statement on President Bush's knowledge of Tracy being released and his gratification over the act.
- August 13 – President Bush signs the National Security Strategy Report for 1991 and forwards the report to Congress. Bush later releases a statement expressing his actions and opinions on the subject. President Bush answers questions from reporters on the hostage situation within the Middle East on the course at the Cape Arundel Golf Club in Kennebunkport during the morning. President Bush announces the nomination of William Taylor for membership and Chairperson on the Board of Directors of the Federal Deposit Insurance Corporation.
- August 14 – President Bush delivers an address at the Annual Convention of the National Fraternal Order of Police at the David Lawrence Convention Center in Pittsburgh, Pennsylvania during the morning. President Bush signs the Intelligence Authorization Act, Fiscal Year 1991 into law.
- August 15 – President Bush answers questions from reporters on hostages, his health, negotiations geared toward freeing the hostages, and golf on the course at the Cape Arundel Golf Club in Kennebunkport during the morning.
- August 17 – President Bush signs the Energy and Water Development Appropriations Act, 1992 into law, which Bush says "provides funds for the water resources development activities of the Army Corps of Engineers and the Department of the Interior's Bureau of Reclamation."
- August 19 – President Bush issues a statement on the attempted coup in the Soviet Union. Deputy Press Secretary Popadiuk says President Bush spent the afternoon meeting with national senior advisors on the subject of the Soviet Union attempted coup and that President Bush "agreed to stay in close touch with the East European leaders and pledged continuing U.S. support for the economic and political reform process in the region."
- August 20 – President Bush holds his ninety-eighth news conference in the Rose Garden during the morning. President Bush opens the conference with an address on the attempted coup in Soviet Union and answers questions mainly geared toward foreign policy.
- August 21 – President Bush is announced by Press Secretary Fitzwater to have "waived for Romania the emigration provisions of the Jackson-Vanik amendment to the Trade Act of 1974" in a response to leaders within the democratic opposition of Romania. President Bush holds his ninety-ninth news conference at the Shawmut Inn during the morning. President Bush begins the conference with an address on the Soviet Union and answers questions on the matter from reporters.
- August 22 – President Bush answers questions from reporters at his home on the subjects of attaining peace within the Middle East and the Soviet Union during the afternoon. Press Secretary Fitzwater states the Bush administration has "entered into agreements with Bolivia to reduce substantially Bolivia's debt to the United States."
- August 23 – President Bush signs Proclamation 6327, designating the week starting with September 15 as "National Rehabilitation Week".
- August 24 – President Bush releases a statement on the casualties of the attempted coup in Moscow.
- August 26 – President Bush holds his one hundredth news conference jointly with Prime Minister of the United Kingdom John Major at his Walker's Point home during the afternoon. President Bush and Prime Minister Major answer questions from reporters centered around relations with the Soviet Union.
- August 29 – President Bush holds his one hundred and first news conference with Prime Minister Major at his Walker's Point home during the afternoon, the questions directed at the pair from reporters centering on the Soviet Union.

== September ==
- September 2 – President Bush holds his one hundred and second news conference at his Walker's Point home during the morning. President Bush begins the conference with an address on the Soviet Union and answers questions from reporters on the subjects of achieving peace within the Middle East, American foreign policy, the defense budget, Baltic independence, and American assistance to the Baltic states. President Bush issues a message on the occasion of Labor Day.
- September 3 – President Bush delivers an address to the Lewiston Comprehensive High School faculty and student body in the gymnasium of the school in Lewiston, Maine during the morning. President Bush issues Proclamation 6329, designating September 22 to September 28, 1991 as "Minority Enterprise Development Week."
- September 6 – A recording of President Bush addressing the upcoming confirmation hearings of Supreme Court nominee Clarence Thomas is broadcast on the radio. President Bush delivers an address to the National Association of Towns and Townships in the Regency Ballroom of the Hyatt Regency Hotel during the morning.
- September 9 – President Bush issues a statement emphasizing "the distinguished record and character" of Supreme Court nominee Clarence Thomas.
- September 10 – President Bush attends the welcoming ceremony for President of Senegal Abdou Diouf in the South Lawn during the morning. President Bush announces the nomination of Paul H. Cooksey for Deputy Administrator of the Small Business Administration.
- September 11 – President Bush answers questions from reporters on Middle East peace and the ongoing Supreme Court nomination in the Cabinet Room during the morning. President Bush delivers an address at the Stan Scott Tribute Dinner in the ballroom at the Washington Sheraton Hotel during the evening. President Bush announces the nomination of Jose E. Martinez for Director of the Trade and Development Program.
- September 12 – President Bush holds his one hundred and third news conference in the Briefing Room during the afternoon. President Bush answers questions from reporters on hostage releases, the CIA and Supreme Court nominations, and Israeli loan guarantees. President Bush delivers an address at the Veterans Administration Substance Abuse Treatment Center in Philadelphia, Pennsylvania during the afternoon.
- September 13 – President Bush delivers an Oval Office address praising the records of his Supreme Court and CIA Director nominees and advocating that Americans join him in supporting a quick confirmation of Bob Gates for CIA Director by the Senate. President Bush announces the nomination of Alan M. Dunn for Assistant Secretary of Commerce for Import Administration. President Bush sends a message to the Senate transmitting the Mongolian-United States Consular Convention.
- September 16 – President Bush attends the presentation ceremony for the National Medals of Science and Technology in the Rose Garden during the morning. President Bush answers questions from reporters on the 1992 presidential election, Libyan indictments, and legislative initiatives in the Cabinet Room during the morning. President Bush holds his one hundred and fourth news conference in the Rose Garden with Chancellor of Germany Helmut Kohl during the afternoon. The two answer questions from reporters on achieving peace within the Middle East, western aid to the Soviet Union, Yugoslavia civil conflict, Israel loan guarantees, Iraq, and Bob Gates' nomination. President Bush announces the nomination of Steven E. Steiner for an according of the rank of Ambassador during his tenure of service as United States Representative to the START Joint Compliance and Inspection Commission.
- September 18 – President Bush arrives in Salt Lake City, Utah during the afternoon, delivering an address on the tarmac of the Salt Lake City International Airport upon his arrival. President Bush delivers an address to the staff of Primary Children's Medical Center in Salt Lake City during the afternoon. President Bush attends a Republican Party fundraising dinner at the Salt Lake City Marriott Hotel in Salt Lake City during the afternoon. President Bush announces the nomination of Kathleen Day Koch for Special Counsel of the Office of Special Counsel.
- September 19 – President Bush gives a speech to Green Line/Interstate-105 Project Construction Site Employees in Los Angeles during the afternoon.
- September 20 – President Bush delivers an address to the Annual National Convention of the United States Hispanic Chamber of Commerce at the Hyatt Regency Hotel in Chicago, Illinois during the afternoon. President Bush announces the nomination of Lanny Griffith for Assistant Secretary for Intergovernmental and Interagency Affairs at the Department of Education.
- September 23 – President Bush answers questions regarding his views on the policies in Iraq and the United Nations in the South Lawn during the morning. President Bush gives a speech to the 46th Session of the United Nations General Assembly in the General Assembly Hall during the afternoon.
- September 24 – President Bush answers questions from reporters on the Security Council at the Waldorf Astoria Hotel during the afternoon. President Bush attends a Republican Party fundraiser at the East Brunswick Ramada Renaissance Hotel in East Brunswick, New Jersey during the evening. President Bush announces the nomination of Curtis Warren Kamman for Ambassador Extraordinary and Plenipotentiary of the United States to the Republic of Chile.
- September 25 – President Bush announces the appointment of Thomas E. McNamara to the position of Special Assistant to the President for National Security Affairs and Senior Director for International Programs and African Affairs on the staff of the National Security Council.
- September 27 – President Bush delivers an address endorsing Clarence Thomas being confirmed to the Supreme Court and answers questions on foreign policy in the Cabinet Room during the morning.
- September 30 – President Bush delivers an address at the annual meeting of the Beacon Council at the James L. Knight International Center in Miami, Florida during the afternoon. President Bush celebrates the first gathering of his Daily Points of Light award recipients at Epcot as part of Walt Disney World's 20th-anniversary celebrations. President Bush attends a fundraising dinner for Governor of Louisiana Buddy Roemer in the Grand Ballroom of the Sheraton New Orleans Hotel during the evening.

== October ==
- October 1 – President Bush meets with Emir of Kuwait Jaber Al-Ahmad Al-Sabah for discussions on Iraq and how the country pertains to United Nations Security Council resolutions. The two make a joint appearance in the Rose Garden during the morning. President Bush delivers an address to the students and faculty members of Alice Deal Junior High School shortly after noon. President Bush releases a statement on the upcoming trip of United States Secretary of Agriculture Ed Madigan to Moscow for an assessment on food within the Soviet Union. President Bush appoints John F. Herrick, Jr. to the position of Special Assistant to the President for Advance.
- October 2 – President Bush delivers an address to the Twelfth Annual Crime Stoppers International Conference at the Galt House East Hotel during the afternoon. President Bush attends a fundraising dinner in support of Larry J. Hopkins in Louisville, Kentucky at the Kentucky Fair and Exposition Center during the afternoon. President Bush announces the nominations of Michael G. Kozak for Ambassador Extraordinary and Plenipotentiary of the United States of America to the Republic of El Salvador, and Victor H. Reis for Director of Defense Research and Engineering at the Defense Department.
- October 3 – President Bush delivers an address at the signing ceremony for the proclamation designating German-American Day in the Roosevelt Room during the afternoon. President Bush transmits a report on the Panamanian Government Assets Held by the United States in a message to Congress. President Bush announces the nominations of Henrietta Holsman Fore for an Assistant Administrator of the Agency for International Development at the Bureau for Asia, David M. Nummy for an Assistant Secretary of the Treasury for Management.
- October 4 – President Bush issues Executive Order 12775, responding to Haiti and imposing certain transactions between Haiti and the United States.
- October 5 – President Bush attends the National Italian-American Foundation Fundraising Dinner at the Washington Hilton Hotel during the evening.
- October 7 – President Bush holds a meeting with the Cabinet for discussions on "a number of economic and legislative policy issues".
- October 10 – President Bush answers questions from reporters on his Supreme Court nomination, reiterating his support for Clarence Thomas. President Bush and President of Costa Rica Rafael Ángel Calderón Fournier deliver remarks in the South Lawn during the afternoon. President Bush delivers an address to the Religious Alliance Against Pornography in Room 450 of the Old Executive Office Building during the afternoon. President Bush attends the Andrew Mellon Dinner at the West Building, National Gallery of Art during the evening.
- October 11 – President Bush answers questions from reporters on the Clarence Thomas nomination while in the Oval Office during the morning.
- October 13 – President Bush answers questions from reporters on the World Series, the Middle East Peace Conference, and the Clarence Thomas confirmation hearings in Holly Hills Country Club in Ijamsville, Maryland at noon.
- October 14 – President Bush answers questions from reporters on the Supreme Court nomination in the South Lawn during the afternoon.

== November ==
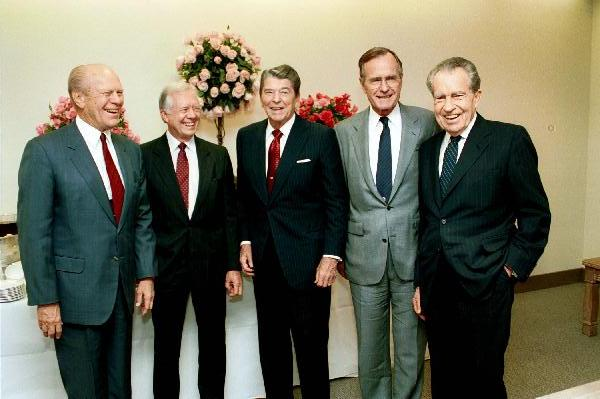
President Bush with former Presidents Gerald Ford, Jimmy Carter, Ronald Reagan, and Richard Nixon, November 4, 1991

- November 4 – President Bush attends the dedication of the Ronald Reagan Presidential Library and Museum in Simi Valley, California. President Bush announces his nomination of James Roderick Lilley for Assistant Secretary of Defense for International Security Affairs.
- November 5 – President Bush presents the Environmental Youth Awards in Room 450 of the Old Executive Office Building during the morning. President Bush answers questions from reporters in the Oval Office during the afternoon.
- November 20 – President Bush announces the nomination of Robert Edward Grady for Deputy Director of the Office of Management and Budget, Henry Edward Hudson for Director of the U.S. Marshals Service at the U.S. Department of Justice, and James Buchanan Busey IV for United States Deputy Secretary of Transportation.
- November 21 – President Bush signs the Civil Rights Act of 1991 during an afternoon signing ceremony in the Rose Garden. President Bush issues Executive Order 12782, an amendment of Executive Order 12594.
- November 22 – President Bush announces his nomination of Jerry Ralph Curry for Administrator of the Federal Aviation Administration.
- November 25 – President Bush issues Proclamation 6380, designating November 28, 1991 as "National Day of Thanksgiving", signing the law during a morning appearance in the Rose Garden.
- November 26 – President Bush answers questions from reporters on the economy and Soviet Union in the Oval Office during the morning. William Barr is sworn in as the 77th United States Attorney General in the Great Hall at the Department of Justice during the afternoon.
- November 27 – President Bush signs the proclamation declaring National Adoption Week in the Roosevelt Room during the morning.
- November 29 – President Bush issues Proclamation 6386, designating the upcoming December 7 as "National Pearl Harbor Remembrance Day."

== December ==
- December 4 – President Bush signs H.R. 1724, the Intelligence Authorization Act, Fiscal Year 1992, and the Tribal Self-Governance Demonstration Project Act into law.
- December 5 – President Bush holds a news conference in the Briefing Room on appointments, reelection, the Soviet Union, the economy, and tax cuts during the afternoon. President Bush signs the National Defense Authorization Act for Fiscal Years 1992 and 1993, enlisting authorizations relating to national security.
- December 7 – President Bush delivers an address to the Pearl Harbor Survivors Association at the National Cemetery of the Pacific during the morning.
- December 9 – First Lady Barbara Bush unveils the Christmas decorations at the White House for the third time.
- December 11 – President Bush issues a statement approving of the European Community Summit as a step toward maintaining the Atlantic partnership.
- December 12 – President Bush delivers a speech at the teleconference for the Arizona 2000 kickoff in the Oval Office during the afternoon.
- December 13 – President Bush delivers an address to the annual Congress of Cities in Room 459 of the Old Executive Office Building during the afternoon. President Bush issues Proclamation 6392, designating December 1991 as "Bicentennial of the District of Columbia Month".
- December 16 – President Bush gives a speech at the Bicentennial of the Bill of Rights in Orange County, Virginia during the afternoon.
- December 17 – President Bush signs S. 1891, an amendment of the Public Health Service and Controlled Substances Acts. President Bush issues Executive Order 1278, an extension of the President's Council on Rural America that mandates its termination to January 16, 1993. President Bush conducts an interview from Room 459 of the Old Executive Office Building with Harold Green during the afternoon.
- December 18 – President Bush delivers an address to the American Association of State Highway and Transportation Officials at the Hyatt Regency Hotel in Dallas, Texas during the afternoon. President Bush signs the Intermodal Surface Transportation Efficiency Act of 1991.
- December 19 – President Bush signs the Coast Guard Authorization Act of 1991 and the Federal Deposit Insurance Corporation Improvement Act of 1991. President Bush conducts a press conference with foreign journalists on the relations of the US with other countries and the administration's general foreign policy in the Old Executive Office Building during the afternoon.
- December 20 – President Bush signs the Telephone Consumer Protection Act of 1991.
- December 25 – President Bush releases a statement on Mikhail Gorbachev resigning as President of the Soviet Union, thanking Gorbachev for his service during his tenure. President Bush delivers a televised Oval Office address on the subject of the Commonwealth of Independent States during the evening.
- December 26 – Dissolution of the Soviet Union. President Bush releases a statement reaffirming American support for foreign direct investment. President Bush issues Executive Order 12785, an extension of the President's Education Policy Advisory Committee that calls for a continuation throughout the entirety of 1992. President Bush issues Executive Order 12786, making changes to pay and allowance rates. President Bush holds a wide-ranging press conference in the Briefing Room during the afternoon.
- December 27 – President Bush delivers a speech on disaster relief at Chase Field Naval Air Station in Beeville, Texas during the morning. President Bush gives an address on his administration's foreign policy at Bee County Rodeo Arena during the evening.

== See also ==
- Timeline of the George H. W. Bush presidency, for an index of the Bush presidency timeline articles

U.S. presidential administration timelines
Preceded by Bush presidency (1990)	Bush presidency (1991)	Succeeded by Bush presidency (1992–1993)
