= Timeline of the George H. W. Bush presidency (1990) =

The following is a timeline of the presidency of George H. W. Bush, from January 1, 1990, to December 31, 1990.

== January ==
- January 1 – A message of President Bush to the Soviet Union is broadcast to the country. The remarks were recorded on December 19 of the previous year.
- January 2 – President Bush sends a letter to Benjamin Hooks, condemning recent racially motivated bombings. He insists that he will make sure the federal government works to get the perpetrators in jail. The Bush administration announces the first full year budget will be late by a week, Richard Darman, the budget chief, attributing in part to Congress the delay. Congressional sources say the president's budget will have a proposed slashing by one fourth of the Low Income Home Energy Assistance Program.
- January 3 – President Bush announces that General Manuel Noriega has turned himself in to American authorities in Panama during an evening address in the Briefing Room.
- January 5 – President Bush holds his thirty-second news conference in the Briefing Room during the afternoon. President Bush answers questions from reporters on women in combat, relations between the United States and the Soviet Union, military action in Panama, the attack on religious Nicaragua workers, covert diplomacy, American military action in the future, and relations between the United States and China. President Bush announces the nomination of Anthony Hurlbutt Flack for membership on the National Council on Disability.
- January 7 – President Bush introduces the Presidential Lecture Series in the State Dining Room during the afternoon.
- January 8 – President Bush addresses the American Farm Bureau Federation in Hall D of the Orange County Convention/Civic Center in Orlando, Florida, during the morning.
- January 9 – President Bush announces the nomination of D'Wayne Gray for the newly created position of Chief Benefits Director for the Department of Veterans Affairs.
- January 11 – According to Press Secretary Fitwater, President Bush has a meeting with members of the Emergency Committee for Aid to Poland for a briefing on the group's activities.
- January 11 – President Bush answers a question from a reporter at the Oval Office on the lifting of martial law in China prior to a meeting with the Prime Minister of Portugal.
- January 11 – President Bush announces the appointment of Richard G. Trefry for military assistant to the president and director of the White House Military Office.
- January 12 – President Bush answers questions during a session with the Youth Collaborative Mentor Group.
- January 12 – President Bush delivers an address at Robert A. Taft High School in Cincinnati, Ohio, in the school auditorium.
- January 12 – President Bush delivers an address to the Chamber of Commerce in the ballroom of the Hyatt Regency Hotel.
- January 12 – President Bush announces the nomination of Frederick M. Bernthal for deputy director of the National Science Foundation.
- January 13 – Press Secretary Fitzwater releases a statement on the arrival of the former Vietnamese reeducation camp detainees and family members into the United States during the upcoming weekend.
- January 16 – Press Secretary Fitzwater states the United States will join the other 34 countries of the Conference on Security and Cooperation in Europe in having their respective military leaders "meet together in Vienna to discuss national military policies, forces, and budgets."
- January 17 – President Bush delivers remarks and answers questions from reporters on American military action in Panama and the Latin America trip of Vice President Dan Quayle in the Colonnade of the White House.
- January 17 – President Bush announces the nomination of Susan Jane Koch for assistant director of the United States Arms Control and Disarmament Agency for the Bureau of Strategic Programs.
- January 18 – President Bush attends the Bush Administration Executive Forum at DAR Constitution Hall at the 9th annual Executive Forum for political appointees of the administration.
- January 18 – President Bush answers questions from reporters on foreign aid reallocation and the social security tax cut in the Oval Office.
- January 18 – President Bush attends the reunion for his presidential campaign in the International Ballroom of the Washington Hilton Hotel.
- January 19 – President Bush attends the Annual Convention of the National Association of Home Builders in the Omni Coliseum in Atlanta, Georgia.
- January 19 – President Bush visits the Everglades National Park. Press Secretary Fitzwater says the visit was meant for President Bush to "emphasize his commitment to achieving the goal of no net loss of wetlands."
- January 19 – President Bush announces the nomination of William D. Phillips for associate director of the Office of Science and Technology Policy.
- January 19 – President Bush announces the nomination of Eugene Wong for associate director of the Office of Science and Technology Policy.
- January 19 – President Bush announces the nomination of Edward W. Kelley Jr. for membership on the board of governors of the Federal Reserve System.
- January 19 – President Bush announces the nomination of Jessica L. Parks for membership on the Merit Systems Protection Board.
- January 19 – President Bush attends a fundraising dinner for Governor of Florida Bob Martinez in the main ballroom of the Omni International Hotel.
- January 22 – President Bush addresses the March for Life rally via satellite from the Oval Office.
- January 22 – President Bush announces the appointment of Arnold Schwarzenegger as chairman of the President's Council on Physical Fitness and Sports.
- January 22 – President Bush orders the implementation of Working Group on Rural Development report from the White House Economic Policy Council.
- January 22 – President Bush announces the nomination of James L. Kolstad for chairman of the National Transportation Safety Board.
- January 22 – President Bush announces the nomination of L. Joyce Hampers for Assistant Secretary of Commerce for Economic Development.
- January 22 – President Bush attends the American Spectator Annual Dinner in the ballroom of the Willard Hotel.
- January 24 – President Bush announces the nomination of Charles M. Herzfeld for director of Defense Research and Engineering at the Department of Defense.
- January 25 – President Bush announces the nomination of C. Anson Franklin for Assistant Administrator of the Agency for International Development for External Affairs.
- January 25 – In a statement, President Bush says that he has "approved a far-reaching economic recovery plan" for aid to Panama.
- January 25 – President Bush announces the nomination of John R. Dunne for Assistant Attorney General for the Civil Rights Division at the Department of Justice.
- January 26 – President Bush addresses the United States Conference of Mayors in the Presidential Ballroom of the Capitol Hilton Hotel.
- January 26 – President Bush delivers remarks to children with special needs and their parents during an appearance in the East Room.
- January 26 – President Bush announces the nomination of Richard J. Hankinson for the new position of Inspector General of the Department of Justice.
- January 28 – Vice President Quayle visits the Panama Canal and joins 1,000 servicemen for the Super Bowl there.
- January 29 – President Bush sends his budget for the upcoming fiscal year to Congress. The budget is US$1.23 trillion and proposes government spending increases.
- January 29 – Vice President Quayle meets with Prime Minister of Jamaica Michael Manley. Manley tells Quayle that the US violated international law with the invasion of Panama.
- January 31 – President Bush delivers his annual State of the Union Address before a joint session of Congress.

== February ==
- February 1 – President Bush announces the transmitting of the Savings and Economic Growth Act of 1990 to Congress during a morning appearance in the Roosevelt Room. President Bush says the legislation is "an important initiative" that he had outlined during the most recent State of the Union address and has the three central components of a "family savings account, capital gains tax rate reduction, and then the homeownership initiative."
- February 1 – President Bush attends the Annual National Prayer Breakfast in the International Ballroom of the Washington Hilton Hotel.
- February 1 – President Bush announces the appointment of Joy A. Silverman for membership on the board of trustees of the John F. Kennedy Center for the Performing Arts.
- February 1 – President Bush announces the nomination of Charles J. Chamberlain for a reappointment of membership on the Railroad Retirement Board.
- February 1 – President Bush issues an order on the China National Aero-Technology Import and Export Corporation Divestiture of MAMCO Manufacturing, Incorporated.
- February 1 – President Bush transmits his decisions toward the China National Aero-Technology Import and Export Corporation Divestiture of MAMCO Manufacturing, Incorporated to Congress in a message.
- February 2 – President Bush addresses student and faculty members of the University of Tennessee in the Alumni Memorial Gymnasium.
- February 2 – President Bush announces the appointment of the President's Council of Advisors on Science and Technology. The panel is intended to inform the president on matters concerning science and technology.
- February 2 – President Bush announces the intention to appoint Katherine E. Boyd for membership on the Advisory Council on Historic Preservation.
- February 5 – President Bush transmits the Federal Republic of Germany-United States Convention on Taxation and Fiscal Evasion to the Senate in a message.
- February 5 – President Bush transmits the Finland-United States Convention on Taxation and Fiscal Evasion in a message to the Senate.
- February 5 – President Bush addresses the Intergovernmental Panel at Georgetown University's Leavey Center. His remarks concern climate change and outline the environmental policy of the administration.
- February 5 – President Bush announces the nomination of Richard E. Bissell for Assistant Administrator for Science and Technology of the Agency for International Development, U.S. International Development Cooperation Agency.
- February 5 – President Bush sends Congress the 1989 Science and Engineering Indicators Report in a message, the ninth of its kind.
- February 6 – President Bush transmits the 1990 Economic Report in a message to Congress.
- February 8 – President Bush attends Fundraising Breakfast for Governor Kay Orr in Omaha, Nebraska.
- February 9 – President Bush announces the nomination of Shirin Raziuddin Tahir-Kheli for Alternate Representative of the United States of America for Special Political Affairs at the United Nations.
- February 9 – President Bush attends the presentation ceremony for the Flo Hyman Award in the Roosevelt Room during the morning.
- February 9 – President Bush announces the nomination of John J. Adair for Inspector General of the Resolution Trust Corporation.
- February 10 – In a statement, President Bush praises the decision by President de Klerk to release Nelson Mandela "as another significant step on the road to the nonracial, democratic South Africa which we all desire."
- February 12 – President Bush attends the morning welcoming ceremony for the President of the Republic of the Congo Denis Sassou-Nguesso on the South Portico.
- February 13 – President Bush signs the American instrument for the ratification for the United Nations Convention Against Illicit Traffic in Narcotic Drugs and Psychotropic Substances. In a statement, President Bush calls the signing "one important step closer to placing in the hands of all signatory nations to this Convention a new and formidable weapon in our continued struggle against international drug traffickers."
- February 14 – President Bush signs the Urgent Assistance for Democracy in Panama Act of 1990 into law. President Bush says the legislation "will allow us to proceed expeditiously on Phase I of our plan to foster economic recovery in Panama."
- February 16 – President Bush issues a memorandum on the Federalism executive order to heads of executive departments and agencies.
- February 16 – President Bush signs the Foreign Relations Authorization Act, Fiscal Years 1990 and 1991 into law. President Bush says the legislation will authorize the "funding for the Department of State at a level sufficient to cover appropriations for this fiscal year."
- February 20 – President Bush announces the nomination of E. U. Curtis Bohlen for Assistant Secretary of State for Oceans and International Environmental and Scientific Affairs.
- February 20 – President Bush attends the presentation ceremony for the Charles Stark Draper Prize for Engineering in the ballroom of the State Department.

"February 22' - President Bush issued a proclamation declaring the International Year of the Bible: The Bible has had a critical impact on the development of Western civilization. Western literature, art, and music are filled with images and ideas that can be traced to its pages. More importantly, our moral tradition has been shaped by the laws and teachings it contains. It was a Biblical view of man - one affirming the dignity and worth of the human person, made in the image of our Creator - that inspired the principles upon which the United States is founded...

Ref. "100 Bible Verses that Made America, by Robert J. Morgan, c 2020 Robert J. Morgan, published in Nashville, TN by W. Publishing Group, an imprint of Thomas Nelson.

== March ==
- March 1 – In a statement, Press Secretary Fitzwater confirms President Bush has "decided today to certify by Presidential determination that the following major drug-producing and/or major transit countries have fully cooperated with the United States or taken adequate measures of their own to combat drug production, trafficking, and money laundering".
- March 1 – President Bush announces that a compromise has been made in forming a bipartisan clean air bill and answers questions from reporters on American hostages in Lebanon, and Nicaragua while at the Century Plaza Hotel in Los Angeles, California.
- March 1 – President Bush attends the dedication ceremony for the North Los Angeles County Correctional Facility in Santa Monica, California.
- March 1 – In a statement, Press Secretary Fitzwater says that President Bush is content with the agreement "reached between the administration, the Senate leadership, the Senate Environment and Public Works Committee, and a bipartisan group of other Senators on the major elements of legislation in the Senate on the Clean Air Act."
- March 1 – President Bush and former president Ronald Reagan answer questions from reporters on foreign policy at the former president's office in Los Angeles.
- March 1 – President Bush attends the California Chamber of Commerce Centennial Dinner in the Los Angeles Ballroom of the Century Plaza Hotel.
- March 2 – President Bush addresses the Academy of Television Arts and Sciences in the Los Angeles Ballroom of the Century Plaza Hotel.
- March 2 – President Bush attends an anti-drug rally in the Santa Ana Bowl. The speech he delivers is wide-ranging, from praising the state of California to touting various policies of his administration.
- March 2 – President Bush announces the nomination of John C. Foltz for administrator of the Federal Grain Inspection Service.
- March 2 – President Bush meets with Prime Minister of Japan Toshiki Kaifu in Los Angeles for a reaffirming of the relations between the US and Japan.
- March 3 – President Bush delivers an address on the meetings held with Prime Minister Kaifu as well as relations between the United States and Japan during an appearance at the Morningside Country Club.
- March 3 – President Bush holds his thirty-ninth news conference with Prime Minister Kaifu at the Morningside Country Club. Questions are posed by reporters on the subjects of trade between the US and Japan, peace talks in the Israeli–Palestinian conflict, Soviet military capability, general relations between the US and Japan, foreign assistance provided by the US, American hostages in Lebanon, Panama, and the United Negro College Fund.
- March 4 – President Bush attends the presentation ceremony for a donation to the United Negro College Fund at the Annenberg residence in Palm Springs, California.
- March 5 – In a statement, President Bush confirms his support for the economic measures espoused by President of Argentina Carlos Menem the previous day and says he had been informed of the president's intentions the previous March 1.
- March 5 – In a statement, President Bush commemorates the 20th anniversary of the Treaty on the Non-Proliferation of Nuclear Weapons by noting the changes that have occurred since its implementation and urges other countries to join in for the continued prevention of the usage of nuclear weapons.
- March 5 – President Bush announces the reappointment of Lynne Vincent Cheney for chairperson of the National Endowment for the Humanities.
- March 5 – President Bush has an afternoon telephone conversation with president of the Conference of Presidents of American Jewish Organizations Seymour Reich.
- March 5 – President Bush addresses members of the National PTA Legislative Conference in the East Room.
- March 6 – President Bush attends the welcoming ceremony for Prime Minister of Italy Giulio Andreotti at the South Portico.
- March 6 – President Bush answers questions from reporters on the German Reunification, the baseball strike, and the meeting with Prime Minister Andreotti during an Oval Office appearance.
- March 6 – President Bush addresses the American Society of Association Executives in Hall A at the Washington Convention Center.
- March 6 – President Bush announces the nomination of Jo Anne B. Barnhart for assistant secretary for family support at the Department of Health and Human Services.
- March 6 – President Bush signs H.R. 2281 into law. The legislation is intended to reduce the dropout rate within the United States and to authorize a program from the Department of Energy providing "funds to local school districts to devise and demonstrate innovative strategies to reduce dropout rates and to encourage those who have dropped out to return to school. Successful strategies can then be shared with other schools.
- March 6 – President Bush attends a state dinner Prime Minister Andreotti in the State Dining Room.
- March 7 – President Bush attends the American Electronics Association Luncheon in the Grand Ballroom at the Washington Court Hotel.
- March 7 – President Bush attends the National Drug Control Policy Luncheon in the Indian Treaty Room at the Old Executive Office Building.
- March 8 – Press Secretary Fitzwater releases a statement insisting that President Bush announced "the first of a series of policy decisions for the long-term space exploration initiative he announced on July 20."
- March 8 – President Bush attends the presentation ceremony for the Panama Campaign Streamer in the Ceremonial Hall at Fort Myer, Virginia.
- March 8 – President Bush attends the meeting on National Transportation Policy in Room 450 of the Old Executive Office Building.
- March 8 – President Bush and Treasury Secretary Skinner release Moving America, a statement on national transportation policy.
- March 8 – President Bush attends a fundraiser dinner for Senator John Warner in the ballroom of the Sheraton Premier Hotel.

== April ==
- April 2 – President Bush attends the Annual Convention of the National Association of Broadcasters in the Thomas P. Murphy Ballroom of the Georgia World Congress Center in Atlanta.
- April 2 – President Bush attends a fundraising dinner for George Voinovich in the Presidential Ballroom of the Westin Hotel in Cincinnati.
- April 3 – Press Secretary Fitzwater releases a statement confirming that the Bush administration has read the text of Hussein's speech the previous day and that President Bush "finds the statements about Iraq's chemical weapons capability and his threatening Israel to be particularly deplorable and irresponsible."
- April 3 – President Bush attends a tree-planting ceremony at the Trees for Tomorrow Park in Indianapolis, Indiana.
- April 3 – President Bush attends a fundraising luncheon for Senator Dan Coats in Hall C of the Indianapolis Convention Center.
- April 3 – President Bush speaks with reporters on assistance for Nicaragua and Panama, the chemical weapons threat of Iraq, and clean air legislation while on Air Force One.
- April 5 – President Bush delivers remarks on his upcoming summit meeting with Gorbachev during a joint appearance with Michael Jackson in the Rose Garden.
- April 6 – President Bush attends a session with members of the American Society of Newspaper Editors in the Grand Ballroom of the J. W. Marriott Hotel.
- April 6 – President Bush attends the twenty-fifth anniversary of the Inauguration of Lyndon B. Johnson on the State Floor of the White House. The remarks focus on discussing the accomplishments of the Johnson presidency and President Bush also praises former First Lady Lady Bird Johnson.

== May ==
- May 1 – President Bush signs the proclamation on National Physical Fitness and Sports Month during a morning appearance on the South Grounds of the White House.
- May 1 – President Bush attends a briefing with leadership of National Small Business United and the National Association of Women Business Owners in Room 450 of the Old Executive Office Building.
- May 1 – President Bush sends Congress a report on Nicaraguan economic sanctions imposed by the US.
- May 1 – In a message to Congress, President Bush transmits the District of Columbia Government's 1991 Budget request as well as the 1990 Budget supplemental request.
- May 1 – President Bush releases a statement on the death of Henry Gregory, calling him an "outstanding leader" and praising his career as a minister.
- May 1 – In a statement, Press Secretary Fitzwater says that the Bush administration is transmitting the Federal Pay Reform Act of 1990 to Congress and that it is urging "prompt congressional enactment of this legislative proposal."
- May 1 – President Bush attends a fundraising dinner for the Korean War Veterans Memorial Commission in the Regency Gallery of the Omni Shoreham Hotel.
- May 2 – President Bush delivers an address to the President's Committee on Employment of People With Disabilities in the Ballroom of the Washington Hilton Hotel. The speech is reflective of President Bush's prior commitments to people with disabilities becoming mainstream in American society.
- May 2 – President Bush delivers an address to the President's Youth Leadership Forum in Room 450 of the Old Executive Office Building.
- May 2 – In a statement, Press Secretary Fitzwater says that President Bush "is recommending to the Coordinating Committee for Multilateral Export Controls (COCOM) that significant changes be made in the list of technologies subject to export control."
- May 2 – The White House confirms the decision of President Bush to not get involved in the possible acquisition by CMC Limited.
- May 3 – President Bush holds his fourth-sixth news conference in the Briefing Room. President Bush answers questions on American hostages in Lebanon, arms reduction talks, the federal budget, the War on Drugs, relations between Mexico and the US, relations between the US and China, and the independence of Baltic States.
- May 3 – President Bush and Prime Minister of Jamaica Michael Manley make a joint appearance on the South Portico. The two reflect on the contents of their meeting, that of a reaffirming of the relationship between the United States and Jamaica.
- May 3 – President Bush attends a presentation ceremony for the Achievement Against All Odds Awards in the Rose Garden.
- May 3 – Press Secretary Fitzwater releases a statement on the meeting of President Bush and Mayor of Jerusalem Teddy Kollek.
- May 3 – President Bush meets with Prime Minister of Lithuania Kazimiera Prunskiene in the Oval Office. Press Secretary Fitzwater releases a statement after the meeting that says during the encounter President Bush "reiterated our longstanding policy of refusing to recognize the forcible incorporation of the Baltic States into the U.S.S.R.".
- May 4 – President Bush announces the establishing "of a Presidential emergency board to investigate and report on the disputes between 11 railroad unions and most of the Nation's major railroads."
- May 4 – President Bush announces the nomination of Stephen Anthony Trodden for the new position of inspector general at the Department of Veterans Affairs.
- May 4 – President Bush releases a message on the observance of Cinco De Mayo stating that the holiday reaffirms the relationship between the US and Mexico.
- May 4 – President Bush announces the nomination of Wallace Elmer Stickney for director of the Federal Emergency Management Agency.
- May 4 – First Lady Barbara Bush meets with Frank Reed, a recently released hostage from Lebanon, on a tarmac.
- May 4 – President Bush attends the commencement ceremony for Oklahoma State University in Lewis Stadium.
- May 4 – President Bush attends the Oklahoma Foundation for Excellence Dinner in Exhibit Halls B and C of the James L. Maxwell Convention Center.
- May 7 – President Bush signs the Asian/Pacific American Heritage Month Proclamation in the Rose Garden.
- May 7 – In a statement, Press Secretary Fitzwater states that the Federal Register will publish "new regulations barring the importation of archeological treasures from Peru."
- May 7 – President Bush announces the nomination of William Bodde Jr. for Ambassador Extraordinary and Plenipotentiary of the United States of America to the Republic of the Marshall Islands.
- May 7 – President Bush announces the nomination of Joseph Edward Lake for Ambassador Extraordinary and Plenipotentiary of the United States of America to the Mongolian People's Republic.
- May 23 – President Bush announces the nomination of Thomas W. Simons Jr. for Ambassador Extraordinary and Plenipotentiary of the United States of America to the Republic of Poland.
- May 24 – President Bush holds his forty-eighth news conference in the Briefing Room, answering questions from reporters on saving and loan crisis, trade with China, relations between Cambodia and the US, Lithuanian independence, trade with China, negotiations on the federal budget, relations between Mexico and the US, arms reduction negotiations, and statehood on the District of Columbia.
- May 24 – President Bush attends a White House ceremony commemorating the twenty-fifth anniversary of Head Start in the Rose Garden. The speech President Bush delivers is reflective of the accomplishments of the program and ends with his intentions toward it for the administration.
- May 24 – President Bush sends Congress the Amtrak Reauthorization and Improvement Act of 1990 without his approval in a message. President Bush explains that he vetoed the measure because it "would interfere with the ability of the Nation's largest freight railroads to obtain needed capital or to change existing capital structure."
- May 24 – President Bush announces the nomination of Roger Gran Harrison for Ambassador Extraordinary and Plenipotentiary of the United States of America to the Hashemite Kingdom of Jordan.
- May 24 – President Bush releases a statement congratulating the House of Representatives on the passage of the Clean Air Amendments of 1990. President Bush says the overwhelming support for the measure "shows that the American people strongly support steps to reduce acid rain, smog, and air toxics emissions."
- May 24 – President Bush participates in an interview with Christian Malar in the Family Dining Room of the White House.
- May 24 – President Bush signs the S. 1846 into law. The legislation is said to make various amendments to Indian laws.
- May 25 – President Bush announces the nomination of Paul L. Ziemer for Assistant Secretary of Energy for Environment, Safety and Health.
- May 25 – President Bush announces the nomination of Calvin A. Kent for administrator of the Energy Information Administration at the Department of Energy.
- May 25 – President Bush signs the Dire Emergency Supplemental Appropriations Act of 1990 into law. The legislation provides funding for Panama and Nicaragua and is said by President Bush to support "our efforts to restore peace and to support the emerging democracies in Panama and Nicaragua."
- May 28 – President Bush speaks with reporters about the explosion on the USS Iowa, his summit meeting with Gorbachev, and Soviet political stability during an appearance on the Cape Arundel Golf Course.
- May 28 – President Bush attends the Memorial Day ceremony at Dock Square.
- May 31 – President Bush attends the welcoming ceremony for Soviet Union President Gorbachev in the South Lawn.
- May 31 – During an evening appearance in the Rose Garden, President Bush answers questions from reporters on the Trade Agreement, arms reduction discussions, German reunification, Lithuanian independence, and differences between the Soviet Union and the United States.
- May 31 – President Bush attends the state dinner for Soviet Union President Gorbachev in the State Dining Room.

== June ==
- June 1 – President Bush has a morning meeting with President of the Soviet Union Mikhail Gorbachev. Bush speaks favorably of the meeting during an afternoon joint appearance with Gorbachev in the Rose Garden hours later but maintains the most important thing is getting "specific results."
- June 1 – Presidents Bush and Gorbachev sign the Soviet-United States Bilateral Agreements in the East Room. These agreements include "a bilateral agreement that will, for the first time, eliminate the great majority of the chemical weapons" stockpiled by the US and Soviet Union, "protocols on limiting nuclear testing", and "a major new agreement that updates and expands our 1973 agreement on the peaceful uses of atomic energy."
- June 1 – President Bush attends a dinner hosted by President Gorbachev in the Golden Dining Room of the Soviet Embassy. In his remarks, President Bush speaks of peaceful relations between the United States and the Soviet Union in addition to his mentioning of the bilateral agreements signed earlier.
- June 2 – Presidents Bush and Gorbachev answer questions on their meetings and the bilateral agreements on the grounds of Camp David.
- June 2 – In a joint statement, the United States and Soviet Union confirming their welcoming of "the Ethiopian government's agreement to permit relief food to enter northern Ethiopia through the Port of Massawa under a UN sponsored relief effort".
- June 4 – President Bush announces the appointment of William Frederick Sittmann for executive secretary of the National Security Council.
- June 4 – President Bush announces the nomination of David H. Leroy for Nuclear Waste Negotiator.
- June 4 – In a statement, President Bush notes the anniversary of the suspension of peaceful protests in Tiananmen Square and discusses transforming China.
- June 5 – President Bush attends a ceremony for the G.I. Bill in the Rose Garden. In his remarks, President Bush reflects on his own experiences with the GI Bill and the success of its benefits.
- June 6 – President Bush announces the appointments of the 1990–91 White House Fellows, the twenty-sixth class since its establishment.
- June 6 – President Bush sends the 1989 Report to the Congress on Environmental Quality to Congress in a message.
- June 6 – President Bush announces the nomination of Roy M. Huffington for Ambassador Extraordinary and Plenipotentiary of the United States of America to the Republic of Austria.
- June 6 – President Bush announces the nomination of Hugh Kenneth Hill for Ambassador Extraordinary and Plenipotentiary of the United States of America to the People's Republic of Bulgaria.

== July ==
- July 2 – President Bush answers questions from reporters on the NATO summit and Soviet Union President Gorbachev at the president's home in Walker's Point.
- July 3 – In a statement, Press Secretary Fitzwater says Americans the United States government are "deeply saddened by the deaths of the many Hajj pilgrims near Mecca on the eve of Eid al-Adha, the Feast of the Sacrifice, this very significant holy day in Islam."
- July 3 – President Bush answers questions from reporters on the Houston Economic Summit, NATO, providing economic assistance to the Soviet Union, and interest rates at his home in Walker's Point.
- July 6 – President Bush holds his fifty-third news conference in Churchill Auditorium at the Queen Elizabeth II Conference Center. President Bush answers questions on the Middle East peace process, relations between the East and West, German membership in NATO, changes in the Soviet Union, Soviet response to NATO policies, human rights, American armed forces in Europe, and strategic nuclear weapons.
- July 9 – President Bush attends the welcoming ceremony for the Houston Economic Summit in the Academic Quadrangle at Rice University.
- July 11 – President Bush presents the Final Communique of the Houston Economic Summit in Assembly Hall at George R. Brown Convention Center.
- July 12 – President Bush addresses the 30th Biennial Greek Orthodox Church Clergy-Laity Congress in the Sheraton Ballroom of the Sheraton Washington Hotel.
- July 13 – President Bush transmits to Congress "a formal report to the Congress concerning emigration laws and policies of the Republic of Hungary" in a message.
- July 24 – President Bush delivers an address at a rally against drugs in the West Philadelphia Community Center in Philadelphia, Pennsylvania, during the afternoon. President Bush attends a fundraiser dinner in the Grand Ballroom at the Waldorf Astoria Hotel in New York City during the evening. President Bush announces the nomination of Edward P. Brynn for Ambassador Extraordinary and Plenipotentiary of the United States of America to Burkina Faso.
- July 25 – President Bush attends a ceremony commemorating Captive Nations Week in the Rose Garden during the afternoon. President Bush announces the appointment of Richard W. Porter to the position of special assistant to the president and executive secretary for the Domestic Policy Council.
- July 25 – President Bush nominates David Souter to succeed William J. Brennan Jr. as an associate justice of the Supreme Court.
- July 26 – Americans with Disabilities Act of 1990

== August ==
- August 1 – President Bush announces the nomination of Thomas F. Kranz for an associate director of the Federal Emergency Management Agency for External Affairs.
- August 1 – In a statement, Deputy Press Secretary Popadiuk says the US "strongly condemns the Iraqi military invasion of Kuwait and calls for the immediate and unconditional withdrawal of all Iraqi forces."
- August 2 – President Bush answers questions on the Iraqi Invasion of Kuwait and the response by the administration while appearing in the Cabinet Room.
- August 2 – President Bush answers questions on the Iraqi invasion of Kuwait at the residence of United States Ambassador to the United Kingdom Henry E. Catto Jr.
- August 2 – President Bush issues a memorandum instructing department and agency heads to not "provide any form of assistance to Iraq, including, but not limited to, financial assistance, loan guarantees, and export licenses."
- August 2 – President Bush delivers an address at the Aspen Institute Symposium during an afternoon appearance at the Music Tent.
- August 3 – President Bush transmits the Regulatory Program of the United States Government to Congress in a message.
- August 3 – President Bush announces the nomination of Paula J. Dobriansky for an associate director of the United States Information Agency for Programs.
- August 3 – President Bush sends a message to Congress on restrictions the administration has imposed on Iraq.
- August 3 – President Bush announces the nomination of Arlene Render for Ambassador Extraordinary and Plenipotentiary of the United States of America to the Republic of The Gambia.
- August 3 – President Bush announces the nomination of Gordon L. Streeb for Ambassador Extraordinary and Plenipotentiary of the United States of America to the Republic of Zambia.
- August 3 – In an afternoon appearance on the South Lawn, President Bush states his activities as it relates to responding to the Iraqi invasion of Kuwait which he says is being viewed seriously by American officials, and answers questions from reporters.
- August 5 – In a statement, Press Secretary Fitzwater confirms the success of the Liberia operation and 59 people "were flown to U.S. Navy ships offshore by U.S. Marine Corps helicopters."
- August 18 – Oil Pollution Act of 1990

== September ==
- September 1 – President Bush announces his upcoming meeting with Soviet Union President Gorbachev in eight days for a discussion on "international and bilateral matters" while speaking to reporters. President Bush then answers questions on the upcoming meeting, the Gulf War, and Egyptian debt.
- September 1 – In a statement commemorating the observance of Labor Day, President Bush notes the historic implications of the holiday and how it relates to the current climate of society.
- September 5 – President Bush attends a White House briefing regarding the National Drug Control Strategy in Room 450 of the Old Executive Office Building.
- September 5 – President Bush announces the appointment of Shawn Smeallie for special assistant to the president for legislative affairs (Senate).
- September 6 – President Bush attends a fundraising luncheon for Governor of Kansas Mike Hayden in Landon Arena at the Kansas ExpoCentre.
- September 10 – President Bush announces the nomination of Frederick Porter Hitz for the new position of Inspector General of the Central Intelligence Agency.
- September 10 – President Bush attends the presentation ceremony for the National Medal of the Arts in the East Room.
- September 10 – Press Secretary Fitzwater releases a statement denouncing the most recent comment by President Hussein as "a transparent attempt to deflect the focus of world attention from his blatant aggression against another country" that has failed in the past.
- September 10 – In a memorandum to federal agency and department leadership, President Bush cites the importance of their participation in the Combined Federal Campaign.
- September 11 – President Bush in an address to a joint session of Congress issues conditions that Iraq must withdraw from Kuwait completely.
- September 11 – President Bush sends a message to Congress transmitting the Annual Report of the Railroad Retirement Board for Fiscal Year 1989.
- September 14 – President Bush delivers a morning address in the Roosevelt Room on the administration transmitting the Enterprise of the Americas Initiatives Act of 1990. President Bush says the legislation "advances both the investment and debt portions of the initiative and contains an innovative approach to the environment."
- September 16 – A recording of President Bush discussing the Persian Gulf Crisis to the Iraq people is broadcast on the radio. The remarks were recorded four days prior.
- September 17 – President Bush participates in a discussion with members of the Regional News Media on the subjects of the Persian Gulf Crisis, the dismissial of the Air Force Chief of Staff, urban crime, economic incentives, AIDS, Medicare, and the Energy Policy in Room 450 of the Old Executive Office Building.
- September 17 – President Bush delivers an address to participants in the Elementary School Recognition Program during an afternoon South Lawn appearance.
- September 18 – President Bush attends a fundraising luncheon at the Colorado Convention Center in Denver, Colorado. The speech he delivers is wide-ranging from domestic issues to the ongoing Persian Gulf Crisis.
- September 18 – President Bush attends a fundraiser dinner for California gubernatorial candidate Pete Wilson in the San Francisco Ballroom of the Westin Bonaventure Hotel in Los Angeles, California.
- September 25 – Hotel and Motel Fire Safety Act of 1990

== October ==
- October 23 – President Bush attends a fundraising dinner for Connecticut gubernatorial candidate John Rowland in the International Ballroom of the Tara Stamford Hotel.
- October 24 – President Bush presents the Congressional Gold Medal to Andrew Wyeth in the Roosevelt Room.
- October 24 – Secretary of Labor Elizabeth Dole offers her resignation to President Bush, who accepts it. President Bush delivers an address announcing her resignation later that morning in the Briefing Room.
- October 24 – Press Secretary Fitzwater releases a statement on the Bush administration continuing "to have discussions with House and Senate conferees concerning an agreement on the budget."
- October 25 – President Bush answers questions from reporters on the congressional handling of the federal budget crisis in the Rose Garden.
- October 25 – President Bush attends a fundraising luncheon for Frank Bond in Room 450 of the Old Executive Office Building.
- October 26 – President Bush transmits the second annual U.S. Long-Term Agricultural Trade Goals and Strategy Report for Fiscal Year 1991 in a message to Congress.
- October 26 – President Bush attends a campaign rally for California gubernatorial candidate Pete Wilson in the ballroom of the Century Plaza Hotel in Los Angeles, California.
- October 27 – President Bush transmits a report on the Panama emergency to Congress in a message.
- October 27 – President Bush announces the nomination of John A. Bushnell for ambassador to the Republic of Costa Rica.
- October 27 – Press Secretary Fitzwater releases a statement confirming the US "believes that order and security should be brought to Lebanon as soon as possible by the legitimate government."
- October 28 – President Bush addresses soldiers on the tarmac of the Hickam Air Force Base in Pearl Harbor, Hawaii. President Bush praises the troops with having "helped to launch what history will judge as one of the most important deployments of allied military power since 1945" and quotes Presidents Franklin D. Roosevelt and Harry S. Truman.
- October 29 – President Bush answers questions from reporters on the federal budget, Gulf War, civil rights bill veto, the Capital Gains Tax, and taxes on the tarmac at San Francisco International Airport in San Francisco, California.
- October 29 – President Bush attends a rally for Bill Price at the Cowboy Hall of Fame in Oklahoma City, Oklahoma.
- October 30 – President Bush delivers an afternoon Rose Garden address in which he congratulates the Cincinnati Reds for winning the World Series.
- October 30 – President Bush attends the election countdown rally for the Republican National Committee in the Regency Ballroom of the Hyatt Regency Hotel.
- October 30 – President Bush signs the To reauthorize the Tribally Controlled Community College Assistance Act of 1978 and the Navajo Community College Act into law. The legislation is said by President Bush to represent his willingness to "recognize and acknowledge the tribal colleges for the contribution they have made and continue to make in improving the quality of life for many American Indian people."
- October 31 – President Bush answers questions from reporters on the Persian Gulf Crisis and whether the US will impose sanctions and the activities of Secretary of State Baker on the lawn of Belle Haven Country Club.
- October 31 – President Bush attends a fundraising breakfast for Stan Parris in the ballroom at Belle Haven Country Club in Alexandria, Virginia.
- October 31 – President Bush speaks with reporters on the Gulf War and addresses the possibility of the US going to war during a South Lawn appearance.
- October 31 – President Bush holds a morning Oval Office meeting with Vatican Secretary of State Agostino Cardinal Casarol to discuss the Gulf War.

== November ==
- November 5 – Omnibus Budget Reconciliation Act of 1990
- November 19 – President Bush addresses his meeting with Prime Minister Thatcher as well as inquiries into the US's handling of the Gulf War during an appearance at the U.S. Ambassador's residence in Paris, France.
- November 19 – The Treaty on Conventional Armed Forces in Europe is signed during a ceremony in the Salle des Fetes in Europe.
- November 19 – President Bush addresses the Conference on Security and Cooperation at the Kleber Center.
- November 21 – President Bush signs the International Narcotics Control Act, 1990 into law. President Bush notes his personal disagreements with portions of the bill and says the legislation "certain provisions that will assist the Administration in implementing our international narcotics control strategy."
- November 22 – President Bush addresses the Military Airlift Command at their ramp at Dhahran International Airport in Dhahran, Saudi Arabia.
- November 27 – President Bush delivers an address to community members at the Teatro de la Ciudad.
- November 27 – President Bush delivers an address to Mexican and American business leaders in the ballroom at the Casino Monterrey.
- November 28 – President Bush signs the Food, Agriculture, Conservation, and Trade Act of 1990 in Room 450 of the Old Executive Office Building during the morning. President Bush says the legislation "will help our farmers continue to be leaders in global agricultural trade."
- November 28 – President Bush signs the Cranston-Gonzalez National Affordable Housing Act in the East Room during the afternoon. President Bush says the legislation will authorize the HOPE Initiative that will enable middle-class families to purchase their own homes.
- November 29 – Immigration Act of 1990
- November 29 – President Bush signs the Stewart B. McKinney Homeless Assistance Amendments Act of 1990 into law. In a statement on the signing, President Bush says the legislation will reauthorize "a broad array of programs to assist the homeless, amend current programs, and authorize certain new programs to address the continuing needs of homeless, especially the mentally ill and substance abusers."
- November 29 – President Bush addresses the Association of Bank Holding Companies in the ballroom of the Willard Hotel.
- November 29 – President Bush attends a reception for student participation in service in the East Room. The contents of his speech focus primarily on the education initiative of StarServe.

== December ==
- December 1 – President Bush signs the Judicial Improvements Act of 1990 into law. President Bush says Title II of the legislation provides 85 new federal judges that "will provide needed assistance in our fight against crime and drugs by enhancing our courts' ability to provide swift and fair justice."
- December 3 – President Bush addresses a joint session of Congress in the House Chamber of the Brazilian Congress Building in Brasilia, Brazil.
- December 3 – President Bush attends a business community luncheon at the American ambassador's residence in Brasilia. The speech reflects on the history of Brazil and the country's current relations with the United States and other regions.
- December 4 – President Bush answers questions from reporters on the Persian Gulf Crisis, Marxism, the Enterprise for the Americas Initiative, agricultural trade policy, American forces in Panama, world power alignment, technology gap, leftist governments in South America, and the military rebellion in Argentine in the Salon de Actos at the Edificio Libertad in Montevideo, Uruguay.
- December 4 – President Bush delivers an address to a joint session of Congress in the Salon de Actos at the Edificio Libertad in Montevideo.
- December 5 – President Bush answers reporters on agriculture trade negotiations, the Argentine economy, and relations between the United States and Argentina in the Sala de Conferencia at Casa de Rosata.
- December 5 – President Bush addresses a joint session of Congress in the Congressional Chamber at the Palacio del Congreso.
- December 5 – President Bush attends a state dinner at the Sociedad Rural Restaurante in Buenos Aires, Argentina.
- December 6 – President Bush delivers remarks at the arrival ceremony on the tarmac at Arturo Merino Benitez Airport in Santiago, Chile.
- December 6 – President Bush answers questions from reporters on Chilean political transition, the Persian Gulf Crisis, trade between Chile and the United States, the assassination of Orlando Letelier, the Middle East Peace Conference and the Persian Gulf Crisis, and Enterprise for the Americas Initiative during an afternoon appearance at President Patricio Aylwin Azocar's residence.
- December 6 – President Bush delivers an address to a joint session of Congress in the Salon de Honor at the National Congress Building in Valparaiso, Chile.
- December 6 – President Bush attends a state dinner in the Patio de Los Naranjos at La Moneda Palace in Santiago.
- December 7 – President Bush attends a breakfast for the American Chamber of Commerce in the Salon de Directorio at the Holiday Inn Crowne Plaza Hotel.
- December 7 – In a statement referring to the Uruguay round, President Bush reaffirms American commitment to "maintaining and strengthening the multilateral trading system and to a timely and successful conclusion of the round."
- December 7 – President Bush attends a state dinner in the garden at La Casona in Caracas, Venezuela.
- December 10 – First Lady Barbara Bush unveils the Christmas decorations at the White House for the second time.
- December 12 – President Bush attends the awards ceremony for the Jobs for America's Graduates in the ballroom of the National Press Club.
- December 12 – President Bush delivers an address on the waiver of the Jackson-Vanik Amendment and on the Soviet Union receiving economic assistance during an afternoon Rose Garden appearance.
- December 13 – President Bush attends the presentation ceremony for the Malcolm Baldrige National Quality Awards in the Grand Hall at the Department of Commerce.
- December 13 – President Bush attends a briefing for the Points of Light Foundation in Room 450 of the Old Executive Office Building.
- December 13 – President Bush declines to reward Hussein for the release of hostages when asked by a reporter in the Cabinet Room.
- December 13 – President Bush attends the lighting ceremony for the National Christmas Tree on the Ellipse during the annual Christmas Pageant of Peace.
- December 14 – President Bush announces the nomination of Lynn Martin for United States Secretary of Labor and answers questions from reporters on the nomination as well as the Persian Gulf Crisis and minority scholarships during an afternoon appearance on the South Lawn.
- December 17 – President Bush addresses cabinet nominations and answers questions from reporters on comments made by President Hussein while in the Briefing Room.
- December 17 – President Bush delivers remarks on the current climate of the Gulf War, stating that the US and its allies neither want war or "a partial solution", and answers questions from reporters in the Rose Garden.
- December 18 – President Bush releases a statement on the observing of Christmas.
- December 18 – President Bush holds his sixty-seventh news conference in Room 450 of the Old Executive Office Building. President Bush answers questions from reporters on the Persian Gulf Crisis, minority scholarships, and economic stimulants.
- December 18 – Responding to the Federal Reserve System's decision to reduce the discount rate, Press Secretary Fitzwater says the choice should promote economic growth in the coming months.
- December 19 – President Bush attends a White House Briefing on Drug Abuse Statistics in Room 450 of the Old Executive Office Building.
- December 19 – President Bush issues a memorandum on the delegation of authority of the certification of countries exporting shrimp to the United States.
- December 21 – President Bush announces the appointment of Phillip D. Brady for assistant to the president and staff secretary.
- December 22 – President Bush and Prime Minister of the United Kingdom John Major answer questions from reporters on the Persian Gulf Crisis and Soviet reforms during the morning.
- December 24 – President Bush's Christmas message to American soldiers in broadcast. The address was recorded thirteen days earlier in the Old Executive Office Building.
- December 27 – President Bush speaks to reporters on the Persian Gulf Crisis, his schedule, and the Soviet Union on South Lawn of the White House during the afternoon.
- December 29 – President Bush issues a memorandum to Secretary of State Baker on trade between the United States and the Soviet Union.

== See also ==
- Timeline of the George H. W. Bush presidency, for an index of the Bush presidency timeline articles

U.S. presidential administration timelines
Preceded by Bush presidency (1989)	Bush presidency (1990)	Succeeded by Bush presidency (1991)
