= Timeline of the George H. W. Bush presidency =

George H. W. Bush, a Republican from Texas, was elected President of the United States on November 8, 1988 and was inaugurated as the nation's 41st president on January 20, 1989, and his presidency ended on January 20, 1993, with the inauguration of Bill Clinton. The following articles cover the timeline of Bush's presidency, and the time leading up to it:

- Pre-presidency: 1987–1989
  - George H. W. Bush 1988 presidential campaign
  - Presidential transition of George H. W. Bush
- Presidency: 1989–1993
  - Timeline of the George H. W. Bush presidency (1989)
  - Timeline of the George H. W. Bush presidency (1990)
  - Timeline of the George H. W. Bush presidency (1991)
  - Timeline of the George H. W. Bush presidency (1992–1993)
- Post-presidency of George H. W. Bush: 1993–2018

== See also ==
- Timeline of the Ronald Reagan presidency, for his predecessor
- Timeline of the Bill Clinton presidency, for his successor
