= Janice Obuchowski =

American lawyer and former government official (born 1951)

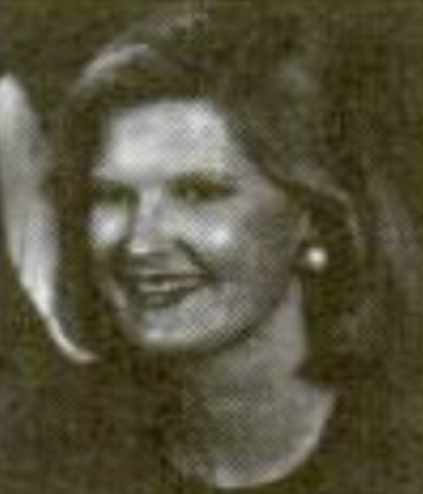

United States Ambassador to the World Radiocommunications Conference
- In office 2003–2003
- President: George W. Bush

Assistant Secretary of Commerce for Communications and Information; Administrator of the National Telecommunications and Information Administration
- In office 1989–1993
- President: George H. W. Bush
- Preceded by: Alfred C. Sikes
- Succeeded by: Larry Irving

Personal details
- Born: Janice Obuchowski; 1951 (age 74–75) Pierre, South Dakota, U.S.
- Party: Republican
- Spouse: Albert Halprin
- Education: Wellesley College; Georgetown University Law Center; Institut d’Études Politiques de Paris

Janice Obuchowski (born 1951) is an American lawyer, business executive, and former government official who served as the assistant secretary for communications and information at the United States Department of Commerce, and administrator of the National Telecommunications and Information Administration during the administration of President George H. W. Bush. She was the first woman to lead the NTIA in the agency's history.

== Early life and education ==
Obuchowski was born in 1951. She graduated with honors from Wellesley College in 1973 and earned a Juris Doctor from the Georgetown University Law Center in 1976. While at Georgetown, she was an editor of the Georgetown Law Journal. She also attended the Institut d’Études Politiques in Paris.

== Career ==
=== Early career ===
Early in her career, Obuchowski worked as an investigator in the District of Columbia Criminal Justice Clinic. She later worked in private antitrust law at various law firms and companies including NYNEX (now Verizon).

=== Federal service ===
Obuchowski worked at the FCC and served as senior advisor to the FCC chair Mark S. Fowler. From 1982 to 1983, she was the chief of the FCC's Common Carrier Bureau, International Policy Division.

In March 1989, Obuchowski was nominated by President Bush as assistant secretary for communications and information at the Department of Commerce, and administrator of the National Telecommunications and Information Administration. She was confirmed by the U.S. Senate in July 1989. In the role, he served as the chief advisor to President Bush on communications and information policy. In 1991, she provided testimony to Congress on the Cable Television Consumer Protection and Competition Act. She also led Executive Branch advocacy for spectrum auction legislation as NTIA's administrator.

In February 2003, Obuchowski was appointed by President George W. Bush as U.S. ambassador to the World Radiocommunications Conference in Geneva from June 9 to July 4, 2003, where she successfully spearheaded the U.S. push for international Wi-Fi adoption. In 2005, Obuchowski was a finalist with the Bush administration as a replacement chairperson to the FCC, succeeding Michael K. Powell. The role eventually went to Kevin Martin.

In 2009, she was appointed to a two-year term on the Department of Commerce's Spectrum Management Advisory Committee.

=== Private sector ===
After her government service, Obuchowski founded Freedom Technologies Inc., a policy consulting firm, and served for a period as executive director of the High Tech DTV Coalition. She later was an executive vice president at NextWave Wireless.

She has served on the boards of several organizations and companies including Spectrumx, Frontline Wireless, Inmarsat, Orbital Sciences Corporation, Stratos Global Corporation, Qualcomm, the Federal Communications Bar Association, Catholic International University, and CSG International. She has also been a guest speaker for the Federalist Society.

She also served a term on the Telecom Board of the International Telecommunication Union (ITU). Doreen Bogdan-Martin, the first woman to lead the ITU has stated that Obuchowski was a mentor and inspiration to her.

== Works ==
- The Opportunity of Private Sector Sharing of Government Spectrum, 2014
- The Unfinished Task of Spectrum Policy Reform, 1994
