= Timelines of United States presidencies =

The following is a list of timelines of United States presidencies.

== George Washington (1787–1797) ==
- Timeline of the George Washington presidency

== John Adams (1797–1801) ==
- Timeline of the John Adams presidency

== Thomas Jefferson (1801–1809) ==
- Timeline of the Thomas Jefferson presidency

== James Madison (1809–1817) ==
- Timeline of the James Madison presidency

== William McKinley (1897–1901) ==
- Timeline of the William McKinley presidency

== Theodore Roosevelt (1901–1909) ==
- Timeline of the Theodore Roosevelt presidency

== William Howard Taft (1909–1913) ==
- Timeline of the William Howard Taft presidency

== Warren G. Harding (1921–1923) ==
- Timeline of the Warren G. Harding presidency

== Herbert Hoover (1929–1933) ==
- Timeline of the Herbert Hoover presidency

== Franklin D. Roosevelt (1933–1945) ==
- Timeline of the Franklin D. Roosevelt presidency

== Harry S. Truman (1945–1953) ==
- Timeline of the Harry S. Truman presidency

== John F. Kennedy (1961–1963) ==
- Timeline of the John F. Kennedy presidency
  - 1961
  - 1962
  - 1963

== Lyndon B. Johnson (1963–1969) ==
- Timeline of the Lyndon B. Johnson presidency
  - 1967
  - 1968–1969

== Richard Nixon (1969–1974) ==
- Timeline of the Richard Nixon presidency
  - 1969
  - 1970
  - 1971
  - 1974

== Gerald Ford (1974–1977) ==
- Timeline of the Gerald Ford presidency
  - 1974
  - 1975
  - 1976–1977

== Jimmy Carter (1977–1981) ==
- Timeline of the Jimmy Carter presidency
  - 1977
  - 1978
  - 1979
  - 1980–1981

== Ronald Reagan (1981–1989) ==
- Timeline of the Ronald Reagan presidency
  - 1981
  - 1987
  - 1988–1989

== George H. W. Bush (1989–1993) ==
- Timeline of the George H. W. Bush presidency
  - 1989
  - 1990
  - 1991
  - 1992–1993

== Bill Clinton (1993–2001) ==
- Timeline of the Bill Clinton presidency
  - 1993
  - 1994
  - 1995
  - 1996
  - 1997
  - 1998
  - 1999
  - 2000–2001

== George W. Bush (2001–2009) ==
- Timeline of the George W. Bush presidency
  - 2001
  - 2002
  - 2003
  - 2004
  - 2005
  - 2006
  - 2007
  - 2008–2009

== Barack Obama (2009–2017) ==
- Timeline of the Barack Obama presidency
  - 2009
  - 2010
  - 2011
  - 2012
  - 2013
  - 2014
  - 2015
  - 2016–2017

== Donald Trump (2017–2021) ==
- Timeline of the first Donald Trump presidency
  - 2017
    - Q1
    - Q2
    - Q3
    - Q4
  - 2018
    - Q1
    - Q2
    - Q3
    - Q4
  - 2019
    - Q1
    - Q2
    - Q3
    - Q4
  - 2020–January 2021
    - Q1
    - Q2
    - Q3
    - Q4–January 2021

== Joe Biden (2021–2025) ==
- Timeline of the Joe Biden presidency
  - 2021
    - Q1
    - Q2
    - Q3
    - Q4
  - 2022
    - Q1
    - Q2
    - Q3
    - Q4
  - 2023
    - Q1
    - Q2
    - Q3
    - Q4
  - 2024–January 2025
    - Q1
    - Q2
    - Q3
    - Q4–January 2025

== Donald Trump (2025–present) ==
- Timeline of the second Donald Trump presidency
  - 2025
    - Q1
    - Q2
    - Q3
    - Q4
  - 2026
    - Q1
    - Q2
    - Q3
    - Q4

== See also ==
- History of the United States presidency
