= Richard Nixon's resignation speech =

1974 address by the president of the United States

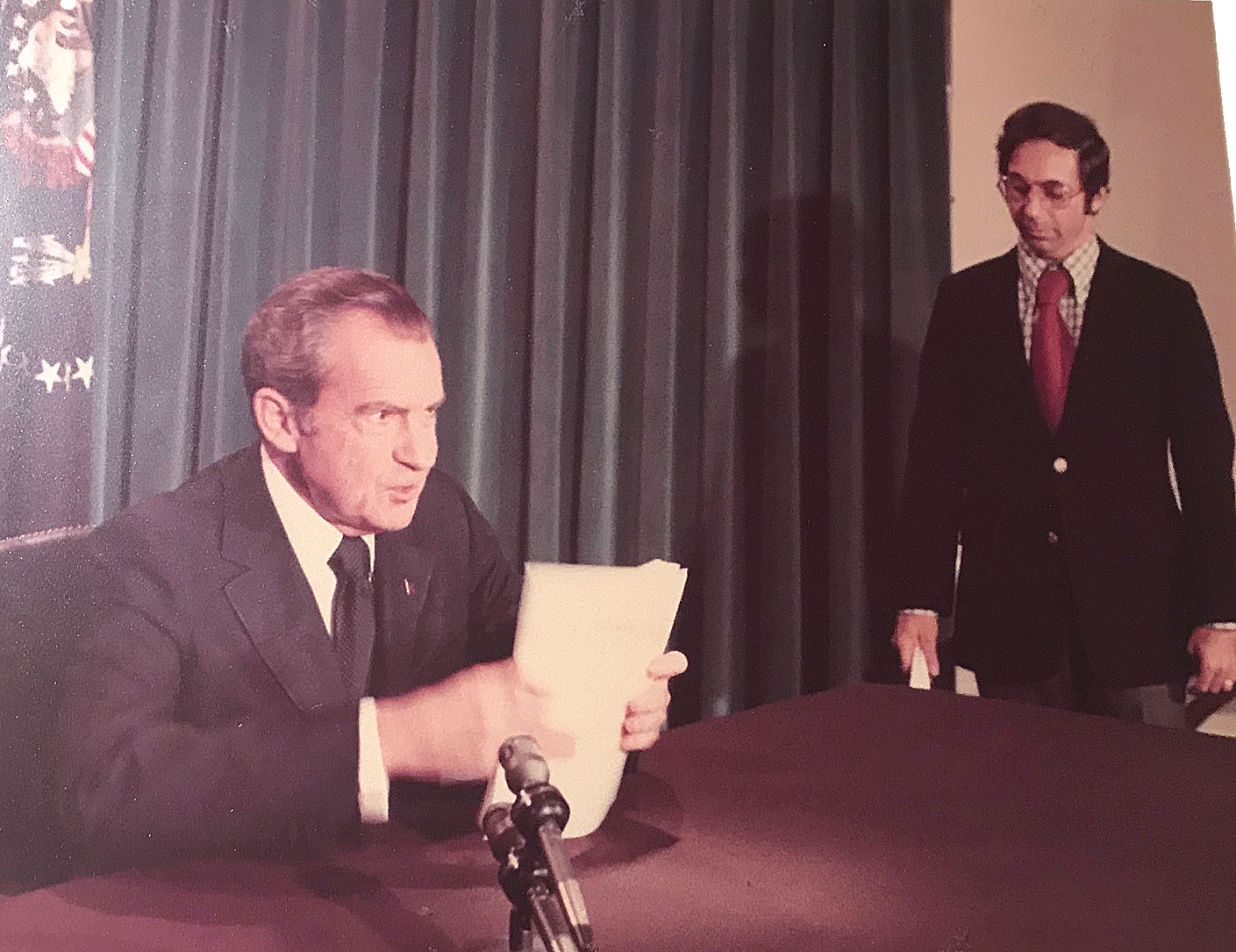
- Nixon preparing to deliver the speech
- Date: August 8, 1974; 52 years ago
- Time: 9:01 pm (Eastern Daylight Time, UTC-04:00)
- Duration: 16 minutes
- Venue: Oval Office, White House, Washington, D.C., U.S.
- Location: Washington, D.C., U.S.
- Cause: Watergate scandal
- Participants: Richard Nixon
- Audio recording of Nixon's resignation speech

U.S. president Richard Nixon delivered a national televised address from the Oval Office on August 8, 1974, announcing his intention to resign the presidency the following day, August 9, 1974, due to the Watergate scandal.

Nixon's resignation was the culmination of what he referred to in his speech as the "long and difficult period of Watergate", a 1970s federal political scandal stemming from the break-in of the Democratic National Committee (DNC) headquarters at the Watergate Office Building by five men during the 1972 presidential election and the Nixon administration's subsequent attempts to cover up its involvement in the crime. Nixon ultimately lost much of his popular and political support as a result of Watergate. At the time of his resignation the next day, Nixon faced almost certain impeachment and removal from office.

According to his address, Nixon said he was resigning because "I have concluded that because of the Watergate matter I might not have the support of the Congress that I would consider necessary to back the very difficult decisions and carry out the duties of this office in the way the interests of the nation would require." Nixon also stated his hope that, by resigning, "I will have hastened the start of that process of healing which is so desperately needed in America." Nixon acknowledged that some of his judgments "were wrong," and he expressed contrition, saying: "I deeply regret any injuries that may have been done in the course of the events that led to this decision." He made no explicit mention, however, of the articles of impeachment pending against him.

The following morning, August 9, Nixon submitted a signed letter of resignation to Secretary of State Henry Kissinger, becoming the first and only U.S. president to date to resign from office. Vice President Gerald Ford succeeded to the presidency upon Nixon's resignation.

== Background ==
On August 5, 1974, several of President Richard Nixon's recorded-on-audiotape Oval Office conversations were released. One of them, which was described as the "smoking gun" tape, was recorded soon after the Watergate break-in, and demonstrated that Richard Nixon had been told of the White House connection to the Watergate burglaries soon after they took place, and approved a plan to thwart the investigation into it. Nixon's popular and political support diminished substantially following the tapes' release.

Nixon met with Republican congressional leaders two days later, on August 7, and was told that he would face certain impeachment in the House and subsequent removal from office in the Senate.

The evening of August 7, knowing that his presidency was effectively over, Nixon finalized his decision to resign.

The president's speechwriter Raymond K. Price wrote the resignation speech. It was delivered on the evening of August 8, 1974 from the Oval Office and was carried live on radio and television.

== Critical reaction and analysis ==
Jack Nelson of the Los Angeles Times wrote that Nixon's speech "chose to look ahead," rather than focus on his term.

In the British paper The Times the article Mr. Nixon resigns as President; On this day by Fred Emery took a more negative stance on the speech, characterizing Nixon's apology as "cursory" and attacking Nixon's definition of what it meant to serve a full presidential term. Emery suggests Nixon's definition of a full presidential term as "until the president loses support in Congress" implies that Nixon knew he would not win his impending impeachment trial and he was using this definition to quickly escape office.

In his book Nixon: Ruin and Recovery 1973–1990, Stephen Ambrose finds that response from United States media to Nixon's speech was generally favorable. This book cites Roger Mudd of CBS News as an example of someone who disliked the speech. Mudd noted that Nixon re-framed his resignation speech to accent his accomplishments rather than to apologize for the Watergate scandal.

In 1999, 137 scholars of American public address were asked to recommend speeches for inclusion on a list of "the 100 best American political speeches of the 20th century," based on "social and political impact, and rhetorical artistry." Nixon's resignation speech placed 39th on the list.

== Popular culture ==
In The Rocky Horror Picture Show (1975), Brad and Janet are listening to the Nixon resignation speech when they get a flat tire that causes them to seek help "Over at the Frankenstein Place".
