= Timeline of the Gerald Ford presidency (1974) =

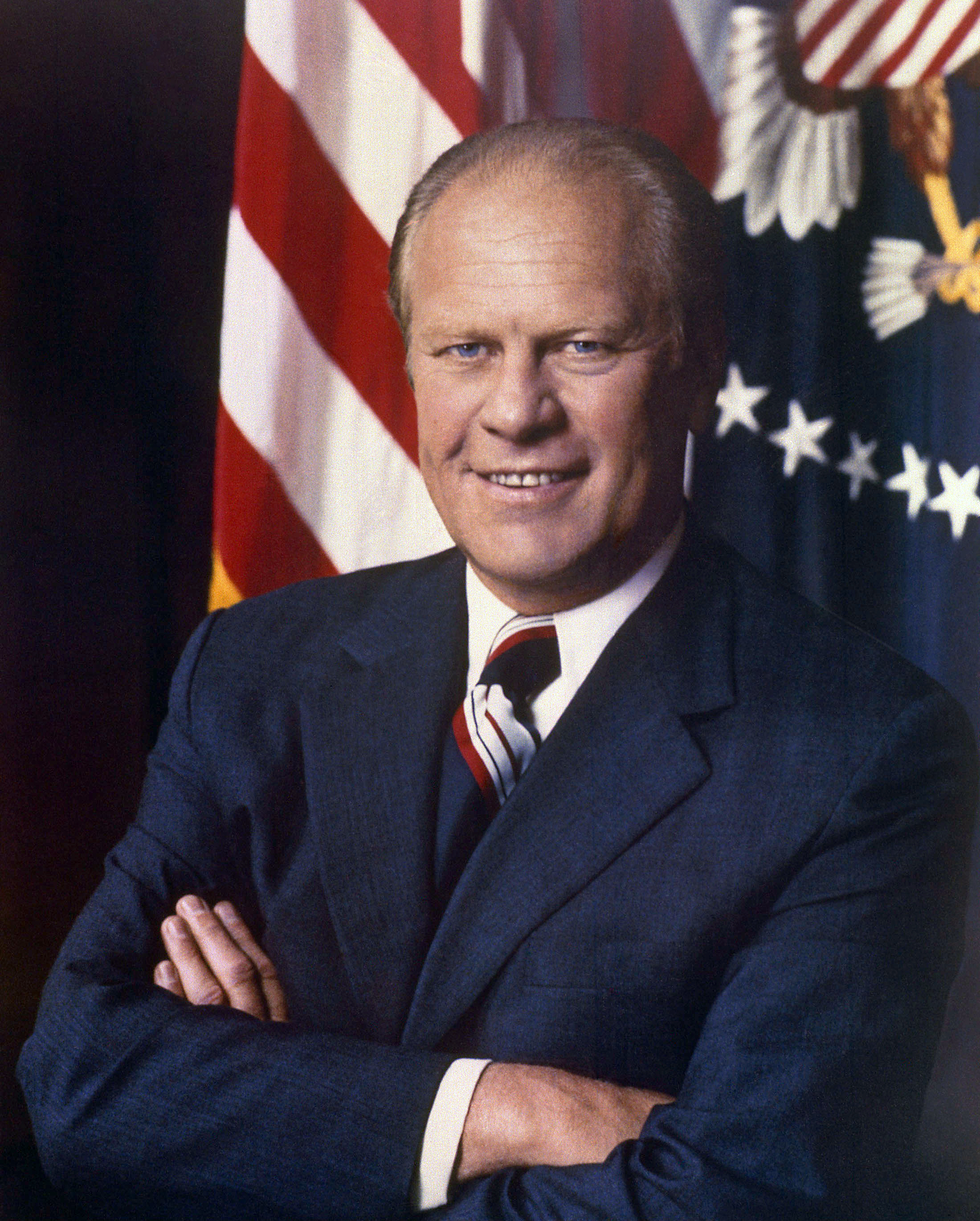
Ford in 1974

The following is a timeline of the presidency of Gerald Ford from August 9, 1974, when Ford became the 38th president of the United States, upon the resignation of Richard Nixon, to December 31, 1974.

== August ==
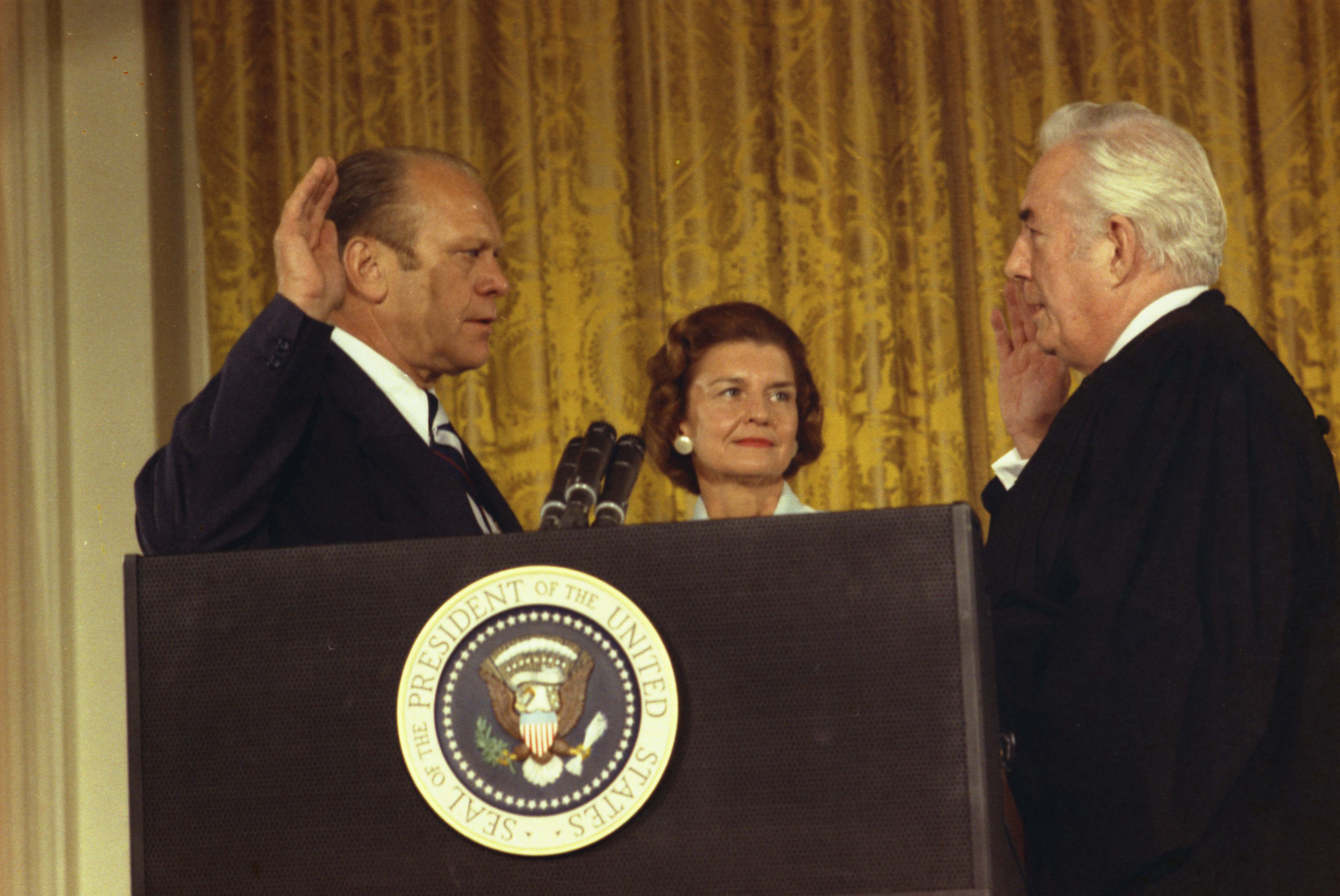
The swearing in of President Gerald Ford by Supreme Court Chief Justice Warren Burger

- August 9 – Gerald Ford takes the oath of office as president, administered by Chief Justice Warren Burger, in the East Room of the White House. Immediately afterward, he speaks to the assembled audience in a speech broadcast live to the nation. Ford notes the peculiarity of his position, saying "I am acutely aware that you have not elected me as your president by your ballots, and so I ask you to confirm me as your president with your prayers." He also declares, "My fellow Americans, our long national nightmare is over. Our Constitution works; our great Republic is a government of laws and not of men. Here, the people rule. But there is a higher Power, by whatever name we honor Him, who ordains not only righteousness but love, not only justice, but mercy. ... let us restore the golden rule to our political process, and let brotherly love purge our hearts of suspicion and hate." This remains the most recent non-scheduled presidential inauguration in American history.
- August 9 – Following the swearing-in ceremony, President Ford meets with Congressional leaders, senior White House staff, transition advisers, senior economic advisers, and foreign emissaries.
- August 9 – Jerald terHorst is appointed to serve as President Ford's White House Press Secretary.
- August 12 – President Ford addresses a Joint session of the United States Congress. He states, "I do not want a honeymoon with you. I want a good marriage." He also states his first priority is to bring inflation under control, declaring it "public enemy number one."
- August 17 – President Ford signs his first piece of legislation, The Forest and Rangeland Renewable Resources Act, with the goal of protecting forest resources, among other goals.
- August 15–18 – President Ford hosts King Hussein of Jordan. He is the first foreign head of state to be received by President Ford.
- August 19 – President Ford delivers a major speech to the Veterans of Foreign Wars convention in Chicago, supporting earned clemency for Vietnam War draft evaders.
- August 19 – Rodger Davies, the United States Ambassador to Cyprus, along with Antoinette Varnavas, an embassy secretary, and a Greek Cypriot national are killed by sniper fire during an anti-American demonstration outside the U.S. Embassy in Nicosia, protesting against the failure of the U.S. to stop the Turkish invasion of Cyprus. Afterwards, the U.S. government quickly sends his replacement, Ambassador to Yemen William R. Crawford, in order to demonstrate that "it was not blaming Greek-Cypriot authorities for the murder".
- August 20 – President Ford nominates Nelson Rockefeller, former governor of New York, to be vice president.
- August 22 – President Ford signs the Housing and Community Development Act of 1974.
- August 28 – President Ford holds his first press conference as president. Many of the questions concern unresolved issues surrounding Watergate.

== September ==
- September 8 – President Ford issues a proclamation which grants former president Nixon a full and unconditional pardon for any crimes he might have committed against the United States while President. The surprise announcement stuns the country and Ford's approval rating plummets in the polls. Press Secretary Jerald terHorst resigns in protest after the pardon.
- September 16 – President Ford issues a proclamation announcing an amnesty program for Vietnam Era draft evaders and military deserters who return home. The conditions of the amnesty required the individual to reaffirm their allegiance to the United States and serve two years working in a public service job or a total of two years' service for those who had served less than two years of honorable service in the military. A Clemency Board was established to review personnel records and to make recommendations for receiving a Presidential Pardon and a change in Military discharge status.
- September 26–28 – First Lady Betty Ford is diagnosed with breast cancer and undergoes surgery.

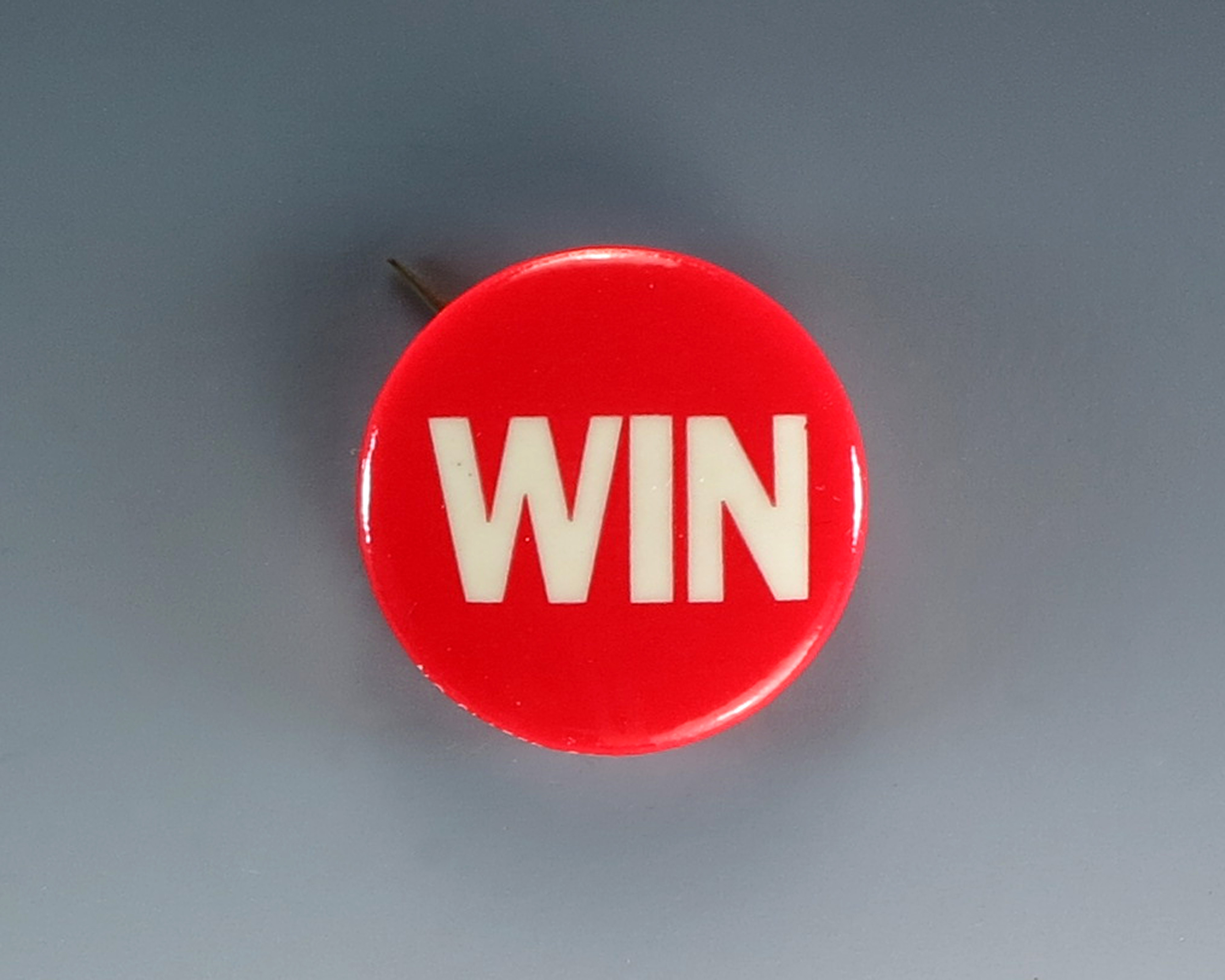
WIN (Whip Inflation Now) button

- September 27–28 – The White House convenes a "summit conference" on inflation and the economy. President Ford closes the conference with an address to the American people, asking them to send him a list of ten inflation-reducing ideas.

== October ==
- October 8 – Ford announces his Whip Inflation Now program before a joint session of Congress.
- October 11 – Ford signs the Energy Reorganization Act of 1974 establishing the Nuclear Regulatory Commission.
- October 15 – Ford signs the Federal Election Campaign Act Amendments of 1974, which seek to regulate campaign fundraising and spending.

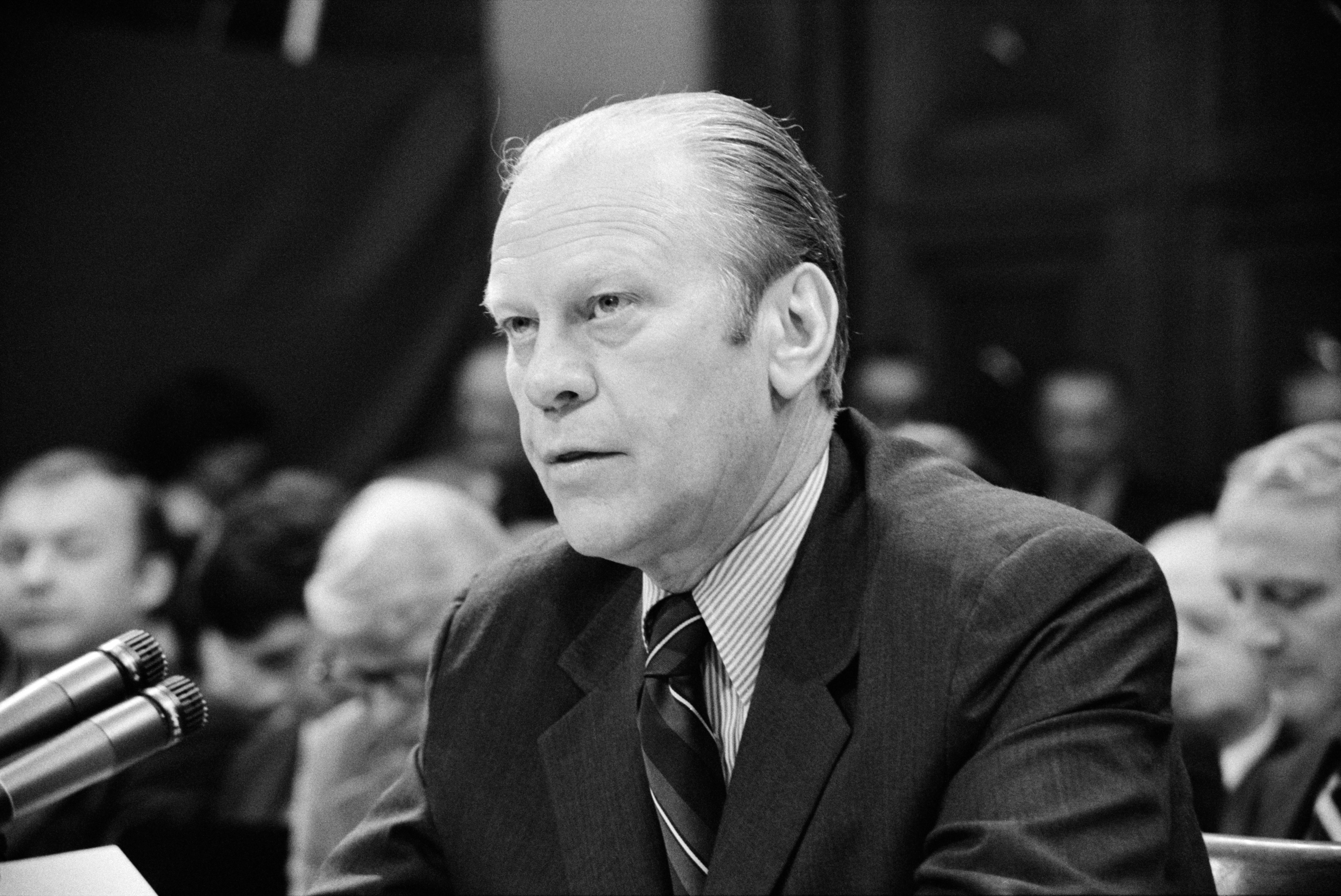
President Ford appears at a House Judiciary Subcommittee hearing regarding his pardon of Richard Nixon

- October 17 – Ford appears before the House Judiciary Subcommittee on Criminal Justice to explain the facts and circumstances that were the basis for his pardon of former President Richard Nixon. He is the first sitting president since Abraham Lincoln to testify before the House of Representatives .
- October 17 – Ford vetoes the Freedom of Information Act Amendments believing not enough protection is given to sensitive and classified intelligence documents. Congress overrides Ford's veto on November 21, 1974, making the bill law.
- October 21 – Ford makes the first international trip of his presidency, travelling to Nogales and Magdalena de Kino, Mexico. There he meets with President Luis Echeverría and lay a wreath at the tomb of Padre Eusebio Kino.

== November ==
- November 1 – Ford meets with an ailing Richard Nixon in a Long Beach, California hospital.
- November 5 – Republicans lose 40 seats in the House and 4 in the Senate, widening the Democratic majority in Congress during the 1974 midterm elections.

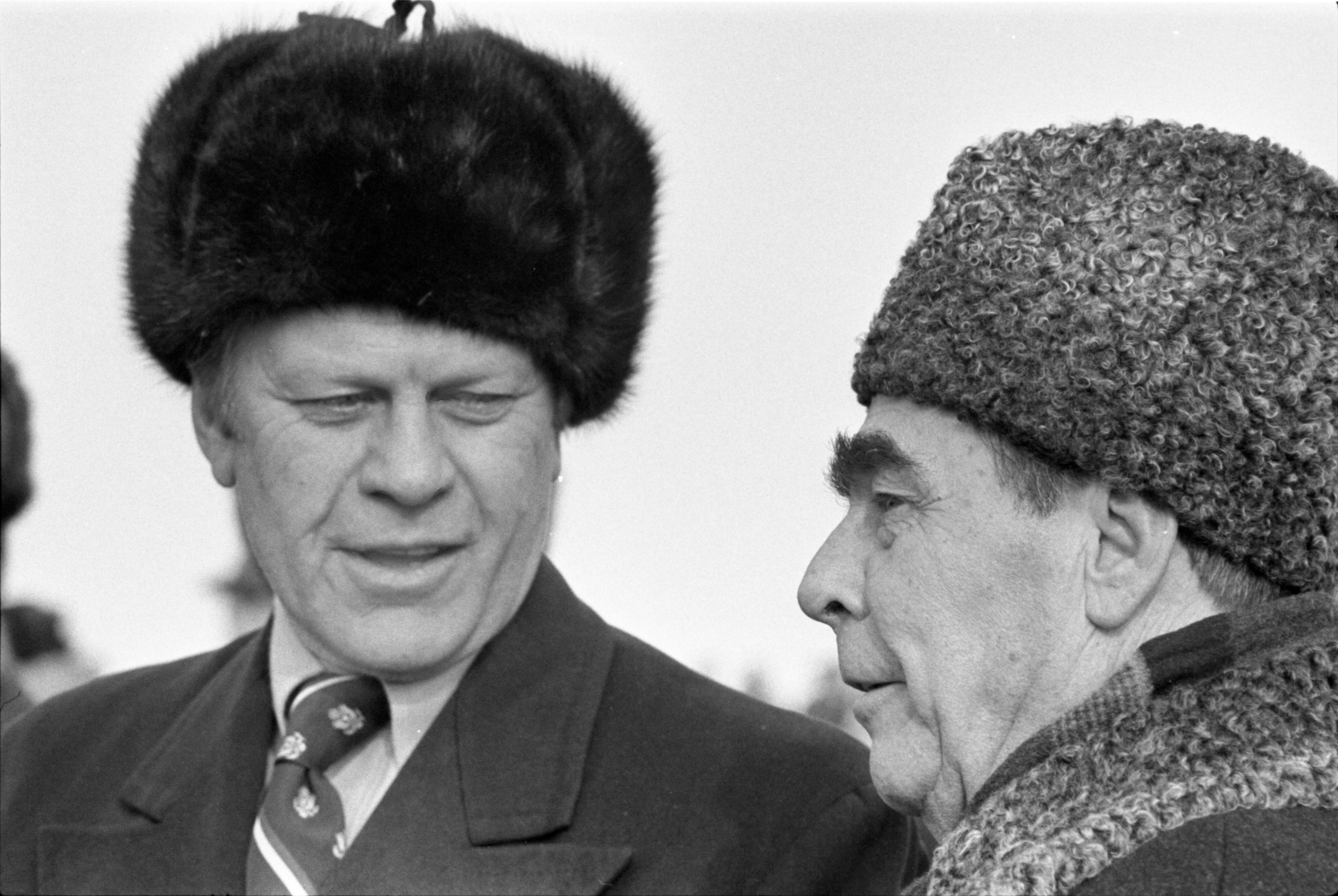
Gerald Ford with Soviet leader Leonid Brezhnev in Vladivostok, U.S.S.R., November 24, 1974.

- November 19–24 – Ford makes the second international trip of his presidency:
  - November 19–22 – State visit to Tokyo and Kyoto; meets with Prime Minister Kakuei Tanaka. This is the first visit to that country by an incumbent American President
  - November 22–23 – Travels to Seoul, South Korea; meets with President Park Chung Hee.
  - November 23–24 – Travels to Vladivostok, Soviet Union; meets with General Secretary Leonid Brezhnev. The two heads of state agree to terms that would limit both nations an "equal aggregate number" of various weapons, including strategic nuclear delivery vehicles (SNDVs), intercontinental ballistic missiles (ICBMs), and submarine-launched ballistic missiles (SLBMs) fitted with multiple independently targetable reentry vehicles (MIRVs).

== December ==
- December 14–16 – Ford makes the third international trip of his presidency, travelling to Fort-de-France, Martinique, for a meeting with French President Valéry Giscard d'Estaing.
- December 16 – President Ford signs the Safe Drinking Water Act.
- December 17 – Ford lights the National Community Christmas Tree, a living 42-foot Colorado blue spruce, decorated with over 2,000 tiny amber and white energy conserving lights, as well as braided gold-colored rope and large gold ornaments. Later, in his first Christmas greeting to the American people as president, Ford mentions that as a former National Park Service ranger and as someone concerned with environmental conservation, he was very pleased by the fact that his first National Christmas tree was a living one.
- December 19 – The President delivers remarks at the American Freedom Train dedication ceremonies at Alexandria Union Station in Alexandria, Virginia.
- December 19 – Following Congressional approval, Nelson Rockefeller is sworn in as the 41st Vice President of the United States.

== See also ==
- Timeline of the Gerald Ford presidency, for an index of the Ford presidency timeline articles

U.S. presidential administration timelines
Preceded by Nixon presidency (1974)	Ford presidency (1974)	Succeeded by Ford presidency (1975)
