= Inauguration of Gerald Ford =

9th United States intra-term presidential inauguration

Presidential inauguration of Gerald Ford
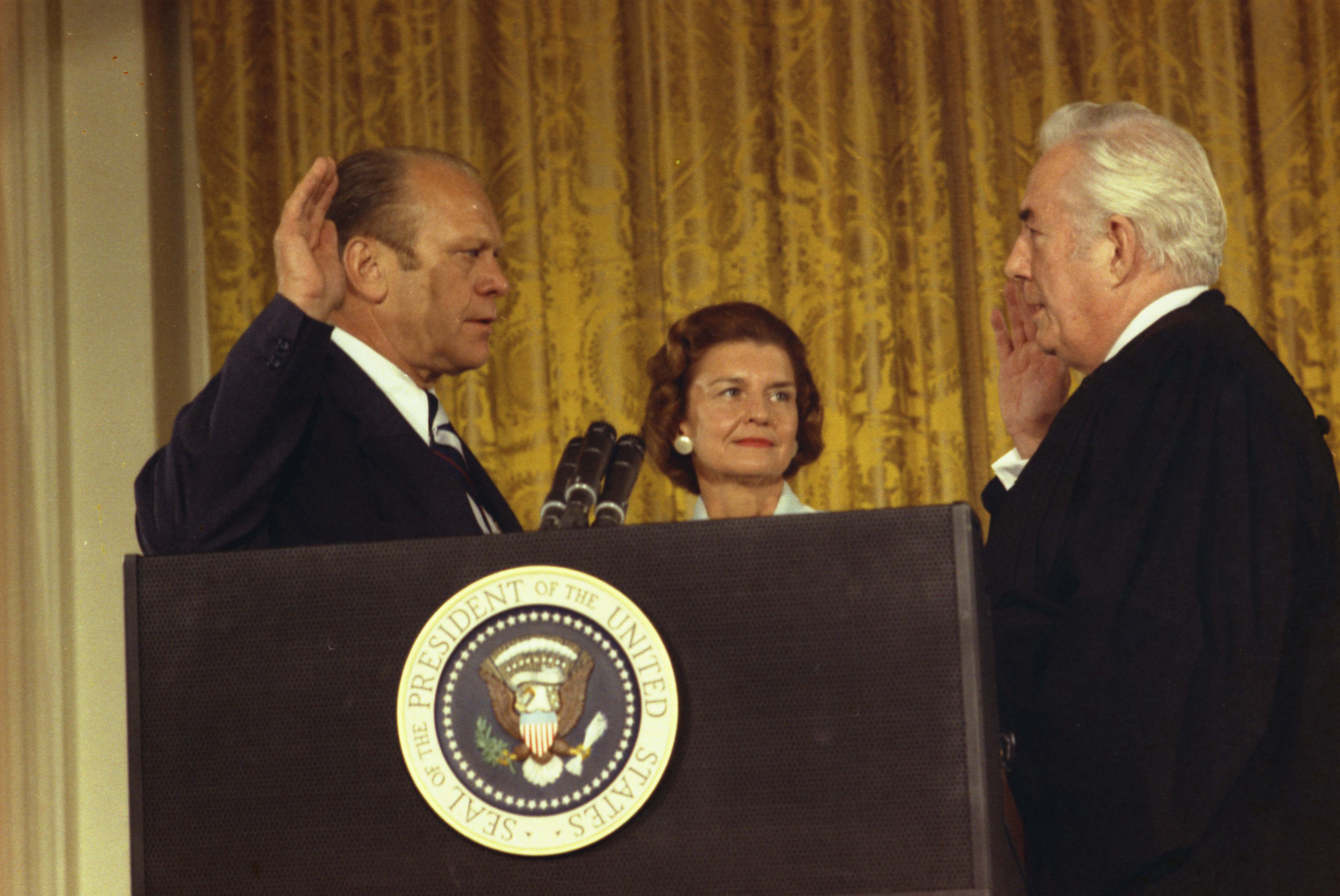
- Gerald Ford takes the oath of office as the 38th president of the United States
- Date: August 9, 1974; 52 years ago
- Location: East Room, White House, Washington, D.C.
- Participants: Gerald Ford; 38th president of the United States — Assuming office Warren E. Burger; Chief Justice of the United States — Administering oath

The inauguration of Gerald Ford as the 38th president of the United States was held on Friday, August 9, 1974, in the East Room of the White House in Washington, D.C., after President Richard Nixon resigned due to the Watergate scandal. The inauguration – the most recent non-scheduled, extraordinary inauguration and the last of this kind to take place in the 20th century – marked the commencement of the only term (a partial term of 2 years, 164 days) of Ford as president. (Note: This is also the most recent Extraordinary inauguration as of the Second inauguration of Donald Trump.) Chief Justice Warren E. Burger administered the oath of office. The Bible upon which Ford recited the oath was held by his wife, Betty Ford, open to Proverbs 3:5–6. Ford was the ninth vice president to succeed to the presidency intra-term, and he remains the most recent to do so, as of 2026.

Although this was the ninth, non-scheduled, extraordinary inauguration to take place since the presidency was established in 1789, it was the first to take place due to a resignation of a president; the previous eight had been occasioned by the president's death in office. Ford had become vice president only eight months earlier, after Spiro Agnew resigned due to allegations of bribery while serving as Baltimore County Executive and Governor of Maryland. He was the first vice president appointed as such under the terms of the Twenty-fifth Amendment. Thus, when he succeeded Nixon, Ford became the first (and remains the only) person to have held both the office of vice president and president without having been elected to either office.

== Nixon's resignation ==
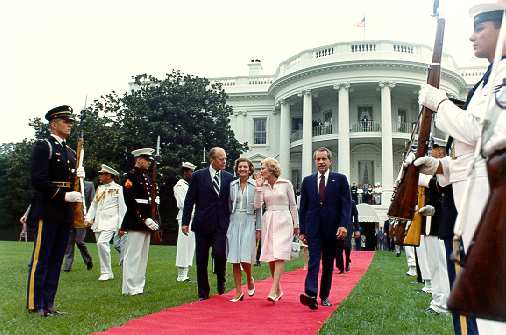
The Fords escort the Nixons across the South Lawn of the White House to Army One before Gerald Ford takes the oath of office, August 9, 1974

Nixon displays the V-for-victory sign as he departs the White House after resigning

In a televised speech on August 8, 1974, President Richard Nixon, who was facing impeachment for his role in the Watergate scandal and alleged cover-up, announced to the nation, "I shall resign the presidency effective at noon tomorrow [August 9]." At 9:00am the following morning, Nixon gave a farewell speech to an East Room assembly of White House staff and selected dignitaries, including the Cabinet and Vice President Gerald Ford. It was an emotional event, with Nixon nearly breaking down multiple times. When it was finished, Ford escorted Nixon to Marine One, where Nixon waved his trademark "V-for-victory" sign with both hands, and moved on to a flight to his hometown of Yorba Linda, California onboard Air Force One.

== Ford's swearing-in ==
Nixon's resignation was tendered to United States Secretary of State Henry Kissinger at 11:35 a.m. At that moment, Ford became the 38th president of the United States, although he took the official oath of office at 12:05 p.m. After the former president (and now private citizen) Nixon left the building, the White House staff began preparations for President Ford's swearing-in. More chairs were added for the larger crowd of invited guests. The oath was administered to Ford by Chief Justice Warren E. Burger in the White House East Room. Chief Justice Burger was traveling in the Netherlands at the time, and was flown back to Washington, D.C., on an Air Force plane. The first phone call that Ford, a former center on the University of Michigan football team, made after his inauguration was on Saturday, August 10, 1974, to Ohio State University football coach Woody Hayes, who had just recently suffered a heart attack.

== Remarks upon swearing-in ==
Immediately after taking the presidential oath, Ford gave a speech (authored by Counselor to the President Robert T. Hartmann) alluding in his remarks to the unique and "extraordinary circumstances" that led to his ascension to the presidency:

I am acutely aware that you have not elected me as your President by your ballots, and so I ask you to confirm me as your President with your prayers. And I hope that such prayers will also be the first of many ... If you have not chosen me by secret ballot, neither have I gained office by any secret promises. I have not campaigned either for the Presidency or the Vice Presidency. I have not subscribed to any partisan platform. I am indebted to no man, and only to one woman—my dear wife, Betty—as I begin this very difficult job ... My fellow Americans, our long national nightmare is over ... Our Constitution works; our great Republic is a government of laws and not of men. Here the people rule. But there is a higher Power, by whatever name we honor him, who ordains not only righteousness but love, not only justice but mercy.

— Gerald Ford, Swearing-in Ceremony speech

Immediately after the 850-word address was over, Ford introduced his new press secretary, Jerald terHorst, to the press corps, and met with the Cabinet.

Ford asked Henry Kissinger to stay on as Secretary of State in the new administration. Later that day, Ford met with ambassadors of the NATO nations.

== References in popular culture ==
The May 20, 2015, series finale of the Late Show with David Letterman was introduced by archival footage of Ford's speech, and prerecorded cameos of former presidents George H. W. Bush, Bill Clinton, George W. Bush, and then-incumbent Barack Obama all saying, "our long national nightmare is over."

== See also ==
- Presidency of Gerald Ford
- Bibliography of Gerald Ford
- Timeline of the presidency of Gerald Ford
- Watergate scandal
