= Timeline of the Ronald Reagan presidency (1987) =

The following is a timeline of the presidency of Ronald Reagan from January 1, 1987, to December 31, 1987.

== January ==
- January 2 – A memorandum by President Reagan on the general system of preferences is filed with the Federal Register Office during the afternoon. President Reagan sends a letter to Speaker of the House of Representatives Tip O'Neill about his "intent to withdraw Romania and Nicaragua and suspend Paraguay from the list of beneficiary developing countries under the Generalized System of Preferences (GSP) effective 60 days after the date of this letter."
- January 3 – President Reagan conducts his radio address from the Oval Office of the White House about the fiscal budget for the following year.
- January 5 – Letters are sent to Speaker O'Neill and Vice President George H. W. Bush for the 1988 budget.
- January 27 – President Reagan delivers the 1987 State of the Union Address to a joint session of Congress.
- January 30 – President Reagan awards Larry Speakes the Presidential Citizen Medal. President Reagan announces his appointments of Charles D. Hobbs for Assistant to the President, and Gary L. Bauer for Assistant to the President for Policy Development.
- January 31 – President Reagan delivers a radio address regarding the goals of his presidency from the Oval Office during the afternoon.

== February ==
- February 2 – President Reagan discussed the upcoming economic summit in Venice, trade issues, arms control, and East-West scientific cooperation with Italian officials
- February 3 – President Reagan met with local townspeople to express gratitude for their assistance to the victims of the Amtrak train accident in Chase, Maryland. The accident resulted in sixteen fatalities and over 170 injuries.
- February 4 – President Reagan convened a meeting to address the refugee situation in Southeast Asia with key officials.
- February 5 – President Reagan held a meeting with Prime Minister Turgut Özal of the Republic of Turkey.
- February 7 – President Reagan delivers a radio address to the nation on welfare reform.
- February 9 – President Reagan participated in a welfare reform briefing for members of the Coalition for America at Risk, including members of the press.
- President Reagan addressed approximately 200 guests, including members of the press, at a ceremony to congratulate the Stars & Stripes on its victory in the America's Cup yachting race.
- President Reagan met with representatives of the Boy Scouts of America to receive their annual report.
- February 11 – President Reagan met with the Special Review Board for the National Security Council to review the Iran policy and the President's role in its development and execution.

== April ==
- April 20 – United States Secretary of the Interior Donald P. Hodel requests that Congress give approval to both oil and gas leasing while recommending the Arctic National Wildfire Refuge. Vice President Bush hosts the annual White House Easter Egg Roll.
- April 21 – The Senate grants limited immunity to former United States National Security Advisor John Poindexter.
- April 22 – President Reagan participates in the White House Correspondents' Dinner.
- April 23 – The Pentagon disputes a prior report that confirming the functioning of the laser and participle beams of the Strategic Defense Initiative would take a decade of research.
- April 24 – 15 members of the American white supremacist movement are charged by the federal government of violations of civil rights, sedition, and conspiracy.
- April 25 – During President Reagan's weekly radio address he says members of Congress advocating for protectionist trade legislation are risking America's prosperity "for the sake of sort term appeal [acquire popular support]."

== May ==
- May 11 – President Reagan announces his nomination of Kenneth Y. Tomlinson for membership on the Board for International Broadcasting for a nearly three-year term.
- May 12 – President Reagan meets with Republican congressional leaders during the morning hours.
- May 23 – President Reagan designates May 25 as a national day of mourning for the victims in the USS Stark incident. President Reagan delivers a radio address from Camp David during the early afternoon, speaking on Memorial Day and the deficit of the budget.

== June ==
- June 11 – President Reagan conducts the forty-first news conference of his presidency at the Hotel Cipriani in Venice, Italy during the afternoon. President Reagan issues a statement expressing regret for "the necessity, temporarily, to withdraw the proposal to sell modified Maverick air-to-ground missiles to Saudi Arabia because of strong congressional opposition." President Reagan delivers an address to the Italian-American conference at the Palazzo Grassi during the afternoon.
- June 12 – President Reagan gives his "Tear down this wall!" speech.
- June 13 – President Reagan discusses world trade during his radio address from the Oval Office during the afternoon.

== July ==
- July 1 – President Reagan nominates Robert Bork to the Supreme Court, starting a wave of controversy.
- July 16 – President Reagan delivers a speech at the Presentation Ceremony for the All-America Cities Awards in Room 450 of the Old Executive Office Building during the afternoon. President Reagan sends the annual environmental quality report, noting "programs and policies governing environmental protection and natural resource preservation are in need of change" in spite of positive trends within the report. President Reagan signs Executive Order 12603 "in order to increase the number of members of the Presidential Commission on the Human Immunodeficiency Virus Epidemic".
- July 17 – President Reagan meets with Prime Minister of the United Kingdom Margaret Thatcher in the Oval Office of the White House, attending a luncheon with her afterward. President Reagan delivers a speech in the South Portico, during which he says he and the prime minister "reviewed the general prospects for peace in the Middle East" and their discussion was "highly successful." President Reagan announces his nomination of Mitchell E. Daniels, Jr. for membership on the board of directors of the Overseas Private Investment Corporation with a two-year term.
- July 22 – President Reagan signs the McKinney–Vento Homeless Assistance Act.
- July 27 – President Reagan delivers a speech to employees at the Broan Manufacturing Company in Hartford, Wisconsin during the morning. Over an hour later, President Reagan gives a speech to a Rotary Club Luncheon in the Old Settlers Room at the Old Washington Restaurant in West Bend during the afternoon.

== September ==
- September 21 – President Reagan delivers a speech to the 42d Session of the United Nations General Assembly in New York, New York.

== October ==
- October 1 – President Reagan sends a message to Congress reporting "13 deferrals of budget authority totaling $1,776,737,627." President Reagan announces his choice to nominate Earl E. Gjelde for Under Secretary of the Interior, and Melvin N.A. Peterson for Chief Scientist of the National Oceanic and Atmospheric Administration at the Department of Commerce.
- October 2 – President Reagan signs the Germany-American Day Proclamation. President Reagan announces his nominations, both in the Defense Department, of Robert Clifton Duncan for Director of Defense Research and Engineering, and Fred S. Hoffman for Assistant Secretary of Defense (Public Affairs). During an exchange with reporters, President Reagan says he is "going to continue working as hard as I can" to see that Bork is appointed to the Supreme Court.
- October 3 – President Reagan delivers a radio address from Camp David on volunteering and in support of Bork's nomination during the afternoon.
- October 9 – President Reagan attends a White House luncheon with members of the Volunteer International Council of the United States Information Agency in the East Room and thanks Bork supporters in the South Lawn during the afternoon.
- October 10 – President Reagan speaks on the Bork nomination in his national radio address during the afternoon.
- October 12 – President Reagan issues a statement on the death of Alfred M. Landon.
- October 23 – Full Senate rejects Bork as Supreme Court justice.
- October 29 – President Reagan nominates Douglas H. Ginsburg to be a Supreme Court associate justice.

== November ==
- November 2 – William S. Sessions is sworn in as Director of the Federal Bureau of Investigation at the J. Edgar Hoover Building. President Reagan announces the nomination of Chandler L. van Orman for Administrator of the Economic Regulatory Administration at the Department of Energy, and the appointment of T. Kenneth Cribb, Jr. for Governor of the Board of Governors of the American National Red Cross.
- November 3 – President Reagan announces his nomination of Ann McLaughlin for United States Secretary of Labor.
- November 4 – A recording of President Reagan speaking about relations between the US and the Soviet Union, produced the previous day in the Oval Office of the White House, is played during the morning. President Reagan announces his nominations of April Catherine Glaspie for Ambassador to the Republic of Iraq, and David C. Miller, Jr. for membership on the board of directors of the African Development Foundation. President Reagan announces the appointment of Frederick J. Ryan, Jr. for Assistant to the President. President Reagan states his intent to lift part of his sanctions made on Japanese products due to "improved Japanese compliance with the 1986 U.S.-Japan semiconductor agreement".
- November 5 – President Reagan announces his nomination of Frank C. Carlucci for United States Secretary of Defense.
- November 6 – President Reagan speaks with reporters in the Cabinet Room during the morning and delivers an address in favor of Supreme Court nominee Douglas Ginsburg in Room 450 of the Old Executive Office Building during the afternoon. President Reagan announces the nominations of Henry Anatole Grunwald for United States Ambassador to Austria, Richard Huntington Melton for United States Ambassador to Nicaragua, Linda J. Fisher for Assistant Administrator of the Environmental Protection Agency, and Bradley P. Holmes for membership on the Federal Communications Commission.
- November 7 – President Reagan delivers a radio address from Camp David on relations between the Philippines and the US as well as the current state of Central America during the afternoon. President Reagan issues a statement on Ginsburg withdrawing his nomination.
- November 9 – President Reagan delivers an address to volunteers and staff of the United Way of America in the film studio at United Way headquarters during the morning. President Reagan delivers a wide-ranging speech at the Jefferson Room luncheon in the Department of State during the afternoon.
- November 10 – The White House releases a statement rebuking the dollar issue discussed by The New York Times and citing unnamed sources with claimed ties to the White House as inaccurate. President Reagan hosts a welcoming ceremony for President of Israel Chaim Herzog in the East Room of the White House and speaks with reporters in the Cabinet Room during the morning.
- November 11 – President Reagan announces his nomination of Anthony M. Kennedy for Associate Justice of the Supreme Court of the United States in the Briefing Room of the White House during morning.
- November 12 – President Reagan holds with Yunis Khalis and members of his delegation in the Roosevelt Room during the morning. President Reagan announces the appointment of Marion C. Blakey for Special Assistant to the President and Director of Public Affairs. President Reagan issues a proclamation designating November 15 through November 22 as "National Arts Week".
- November 13 – President Reagan hosts the ceremony for the presentation of Young American Medals for Bravery and Service in Room 450 of the Old Executive Office Building during the afternoon.
- November 14 – President Reagan gives an afternoon radio address on Anthony Kennedy, Central America, and reducing the deficit.
- November 16 – President Reagan delivers an address at the Annual Meeting of the American Council of Life Insurance at the Sheraton Ballroom in the Washington-Sheraton Hotel during the morning. President Reagan issues Proclamation 5742, recognizing the Disabled American Veterans Vietnam Veterans National Memorial as being nationally significant.
- November 17 – President Reagan submits a message to Congress transmitting the Japan-United States Fishery Agreement.
- November 23 – Frank C. Carlucci is sworn in as the 16th United States Secretary of Defense.
- November 24 – President Reagan issues Executive Order 12616, designed to restore law and order in Atlanta, Georgia. President Reagan speaks with reporters in Denver, Colorado during the morning and delivers an address to Martin Marietta Denver Astronautics Employees in Waterton, Colorado during the afternoon.
- November 28 – President Reagan delivers a morning radio address on US relations with the Soviet Union.
- November 30 – President Reagan gives a speech at a White House briefing dedicated to reducing the deficit in the East Room during the morning and delivers an address on his foreign policy at a luncheon in the ballroom at the Willard Hotel during the afternoon. President Reagan signs the Older Americans Act Amendments of 1987.

== December ==
- December 1 – President Reagan states he has nominated Leonard H.O. Spearman, Sr. for United States Ambassador to the Republic of Rwanda. President Reagan delivers a speech and answers questions in the Veterans' Memorial Coliseum at the Duval County public schools in Jacksonville, Florida.
- December 2 – President Reagan sends a letter to Speaker of the House O'Neill and Vice President Bush on the Soviet Union not complying with the Arms Control Agreements. President Reagan sends Congress two versions of the Public Law 99 - 145 mandate of the annual report on the choice of Soviet Union to not comply with the Arms Control Agreements.
- December 3 – James H. Burnley IV is sworn in as the 9th United States Secretary of Transportation. President Reagan announces his nominations of T. S. Ary for Director of the Bureau of Mines at the Department of the Interior, Wendy Lee Gramm for Commissioner of the Commodity Futures Trading Commission, and E. Phillips for membership on the Federal Trade Commission, and his appointments of Warren Lloyd Miller for membership on the District of Columbia Law Revision Commission, and Beny J. Primm for membership on the White House Conference for a Drug Free America.
- December 4 – President Reagan announces the nomination of Mark Sullivan III for General Counsel for the Department of the Treasury.
- December 5 – President Reagan delivers a radio address from the Oval Office on the topics of reducing the deficit and relations between the US and the Soviet Union. President Reagan issues a proclamation designating the upcoming December 17 as "Wright Brothers Day", reasoning that "Wilbur and Orville Wright ushered in the age of modern aviation with an accomplishment unprecedented in history".
- December 7 – President Reagan answers questions about Gorbachev from reporters while in the Roosevelt Room of the White House during the afternoon. President Reagan signs the Sentencing Act of 1987, amending the Sentencing Reform Act of 1984.
- December 8 – President Reagan signs the Intermediate-Range Nuclear Forces Treaty with USSR head of state Mikhail Gorbachev.
- December 8–10 – President Reagan attends the Washington Summit.
- December 11 – President Reagan speaks and answers questions from news editors and broadcasters in the Old Executive Office Building's Room 450 during the afternoon. President Reagan announces the nominations of Hershey Gold for membership on the United States Advisory Commission on Public Diplomacy, Susan Wing for membership on the Federal Communications Commission, J. Wade Gilley for membership on the National Advisory Council on Educational Research and Improvement, Warren Keating Hendriks, Jr. for membership on the Advisory Committee on Federal Pay, Gloria Sherwood for membership on the Federal Council on the Aging, and Frank G. Zarb for Director of the Securities Investor Protection Corporation.
- December 12 – President Reagan delivers a radio address from Camp David on the US's relations with the Soviet Union during the afternoon.
- December 14 – President Reagan gives a speech on NATO to the board of trustees of the Center for Strategic and International Studies in the Wadsworth Room at the International Club during the morning. President Reagan announces the appointments of Charles Nicholas Rostow for Special Assistant to the President for National Security Affairs and Myron J. Mintz to be a member of the Advisory Committee to the Pension Benefit Guaranty Corporation, the nominations of Jay Kenneth Katzen for membership on the board of directors of the African Development Foundation and Jose M. Deetjen for membership on the board of directors of the Inter-American Foundation, and the designation of Murray P. Hayutin for Chairman of the Advisory Committee to the Pension Benefit Guaranty Corporation.
- December 21 – President Reagan announces the nominations of J. Daniel Howard for Assistant Secretary of Defense and C. Anson Franklin for Assistant Secretary of Energy.
- December 22 – President Reagan signs Executive Order 12618, amending Executive Order 12591 with a new section.
- December 23 – President Reagan issues proclamations for the upcoming 1988 to be known as the "Year of New Sweden", January 8 of the following year being designated as "National Skiing Day", and January 28 to be known as the "National Day of Excellence".
- December 24 – President Reagan signs Executive Order 12620, a delegation of authority. President Reagan signs a proclamation in regards to the European Community to the United States, "imposing and temporarily suspending duties on approximately $100 million worth" of their exports.
- December 26 – A radio broadcast, recorded by President Reagan three days earlier in the Roosevelt Room, is released, during which the president calls for volunteering and selfless acts.
- December 27 – President Reagan releases a statement noting the eighth anniversary of the invasion of Afghanistan by the Soviet Union.
- December 29 – President Reagan signs Executive Order 12621, an amendment of Section 2(b) of the prior month's Executive Order 12614 to change the reading to "The Task Force shall submit its recommendations to the President no later than January 8, 1988."
- December 31 – President Reagan issues Executive Order 12622, adjusting payment and allowance rates. The law is said to "provide, as proposed by the administration, a 4.2-percent cost-of-living increase in the monthly benefit checks of over 2.2 million veterans with service-connected disabilities and their dependents and to about 310,000 surviving spouses and children of veterans whose deaths were service-connected."

U.S. presidential administration timelines
Preceded by Reagan presidency (1986)	Reagan presidency (1987)	Succeeded by Reagan presidency (1988-1989)
