= Timeline of the Gerald Ford presidency (1975) =

The following is a timeline of the presidency of Gerald Ford from January 1, 1975, to December 31, 1975.

== January ==
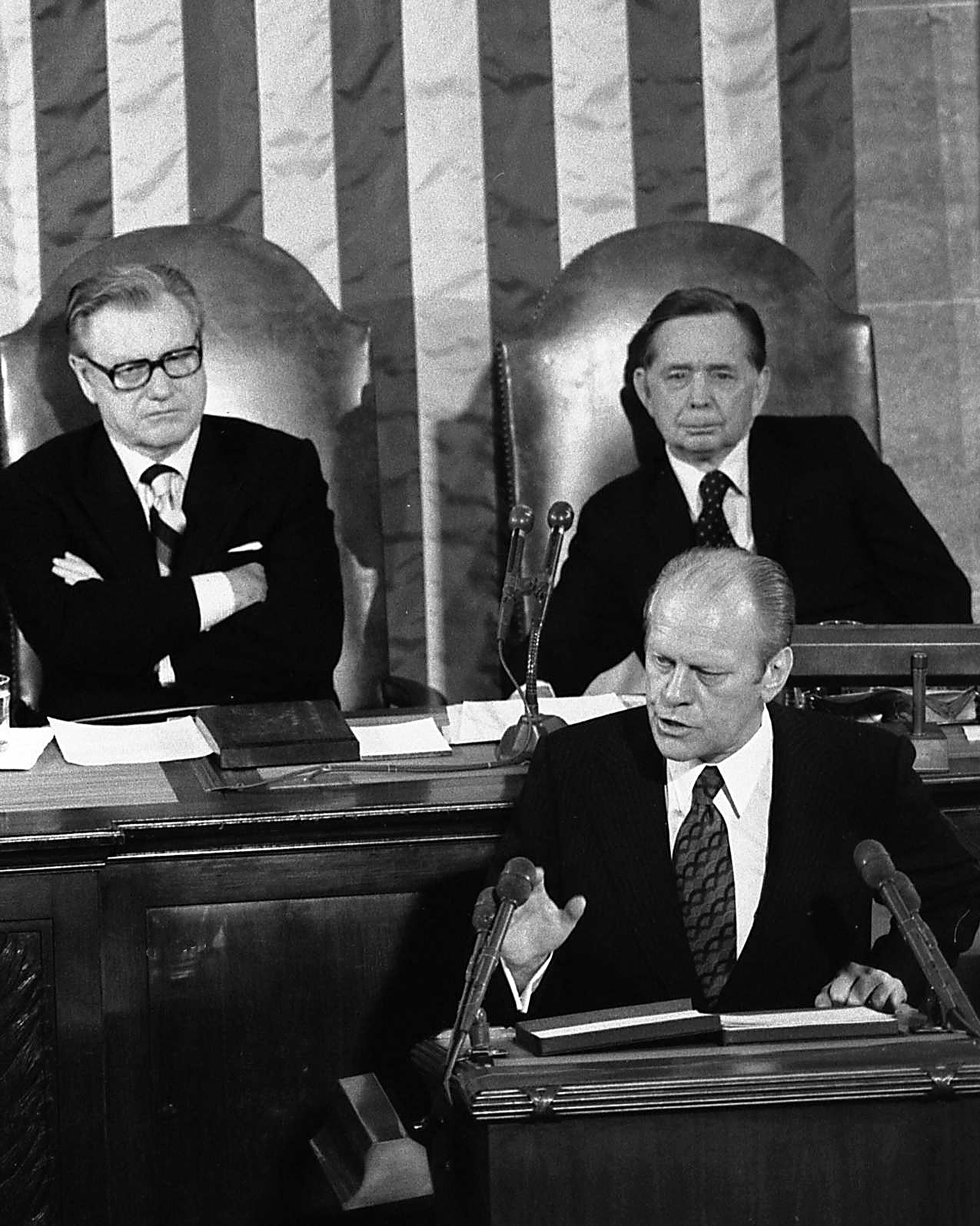
President Gerald Ford with Vice President Nelson Rockefeller and House Speaker Carl Albert during the 1975 State of the Union address.

- January 1 – Ford signs the Privacy Act of 1974.
- January 4 – Ford signs the Federal-Aid Highway Amendments of 1974. Among other changes, the law permanently implements a national 55-mph speed limit (which had already been a temporary limit) for the Interstate Highway System.
- January 4 – Ford names a Blue Ribbon panel, chaired by Vice President Rockefeller, to review CIA Activities within the United States in response to allegations made in a December New York Times article by Seymour Hersh.
- January 13 – Ford delivers a "fireside chat" to the nation, outlining his proposals to fight inflation, the economic recession, and energy dependence.
- January 15 – In his first State of the Union Address, Ford announces bluntly that "the state of the Union is not good. Millions of Americans are out of work. Recession and inflation are eroding the money of millions more. Prices are too high, and sales are too slow." To remedy these problems, Ford proposes tax cuts for American families and businesses, and strongly advocates for the reduction of government spending.

== February ==
- February 7 – Edward H. Levi is sworn in as the new Attorney General of the United States replacing William B. Saxbe, whom Ford appoints as U.S. Ambassador to India.

== March ==
- March 10 – Carla Hills becomes United States Secretary of Housing and Urban Development, the first woman to serve in this position.
- March 29 – Ford signs the Tax Reduction Act of 1975.

== April ==
- April 3 – President Ford announces Operation Babylift, which would evacuate about 2,000 orphans from south Vietnam.
- April 8 – President Ford signs Executive Order 11850, a renunciation of certain uses in war of chemical herbicides and riot control agents. The executive order restricts the use of herbicides, and riot control agents, including tear gas. Each and every use would require explicit approval.
- April 10 – As divisions of the North Vietnamese Army approach Saigon; Ford addresses a joint session of Congress to request, unsuccessfully, financial assistance for South Vietnam and Cambodia. (Vietnam Humanitarian Assistance and Evacuation Act of 1975) During the speech two freshman Democrats, Toby Moffett of Connecticut and George Miller of California walk out in protest.
- April 12 – Ford orders the evacuation of U.S. personnel (military and civilian) and allied Cambodians from Cambodia as the Khmer Rouge advance on the capital Phnom Penh. The Khmer Rouge take over the country on April 17, 1975.
- April 23 – In a speech at Tulane University, President Ford declares that the Vietnam War "is finished as far as America is concerned."

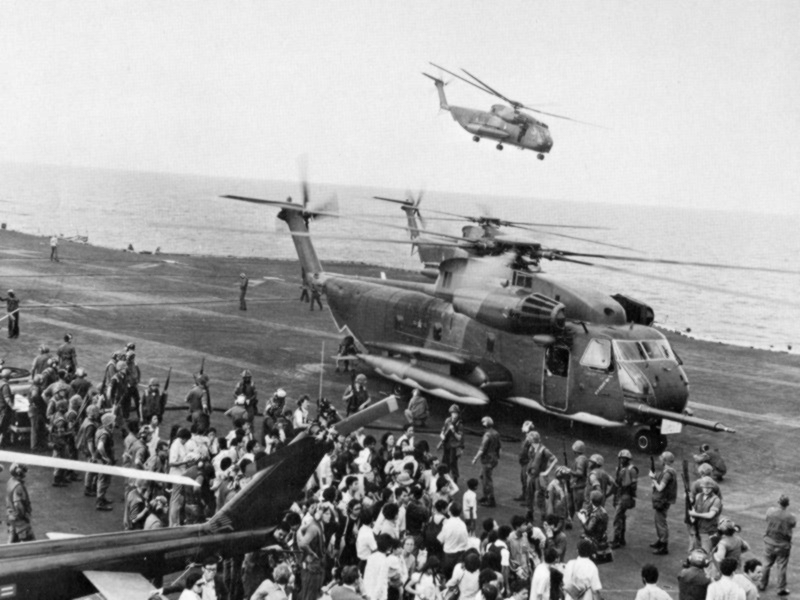
Evacuees from Saigon, South Vietnam are offloaded onto the U.S. Navy aircraft carrier USS Midway, during "Operation Frequent Wind", April 29, 1975.

- April 28 – With the fall of Saigon to the North Vietnamese Army immanent, President Ford orders the emergency evacuation of all remaining American military personnel and civilians and at-risk South Vietnamese nationals from the city.
- April 29–30 – Operation Frequent Wind, the final phase in the American evacuation from South Vietnam, is carried out. More than 1,400 U.S. citizens and 5,500 third country nationals and South Vietnamese are evacuated by helicopter from landing zones in and around the United States Embassy and Tân Sơn Nhứt Airport in Saigon. It is the largest helicopter evacuation in history. By the afternoon of April 30, North Vietnamese troops are in control of the important points of the city (subsequently renamed Hồ Chí Minh City) and have raised their flag over the South Vietnamese presidential palace.

== May ==
- May 12–15 – When Cambodia seizes the American container ship SS Mayaguez in international waters, Ford orders U.S. Marines to rescue the ship's crew. The civilians are safely recovered and a long hostage crisis averted, but many Marines die. This was the last official battle of the Vietnam War. The names of the Americans killed, as well as those of three Marines who were left behind on the island of Koh Tang after the battle and were subsequently executed by the Khmer Rouge, are the last names on the Vietnam Veterans Memorial.
- May 15 – The construction of an outdoor swimming pool at the White House is announced. Ford swam twice daily before his presidency and regretted being unable to do so at the White House.

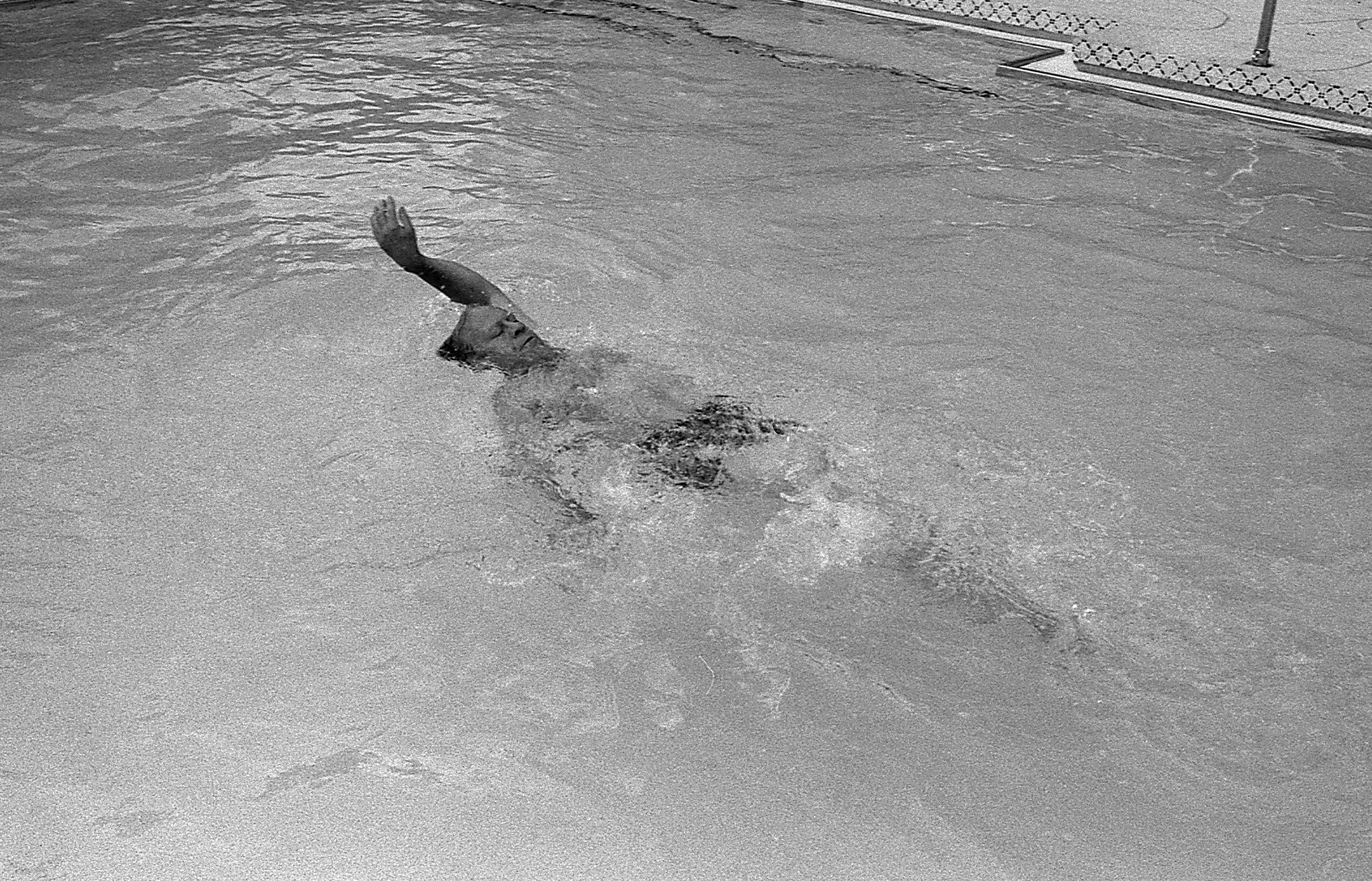
Ford swimming in the White House swimming pool in July 1975.

- May 23 – Ford signs the Indochina Migration and Refugee Assistance Act, allowing refugees from South Vietnam, Laos and Cambodia to enter the United States under a special status.

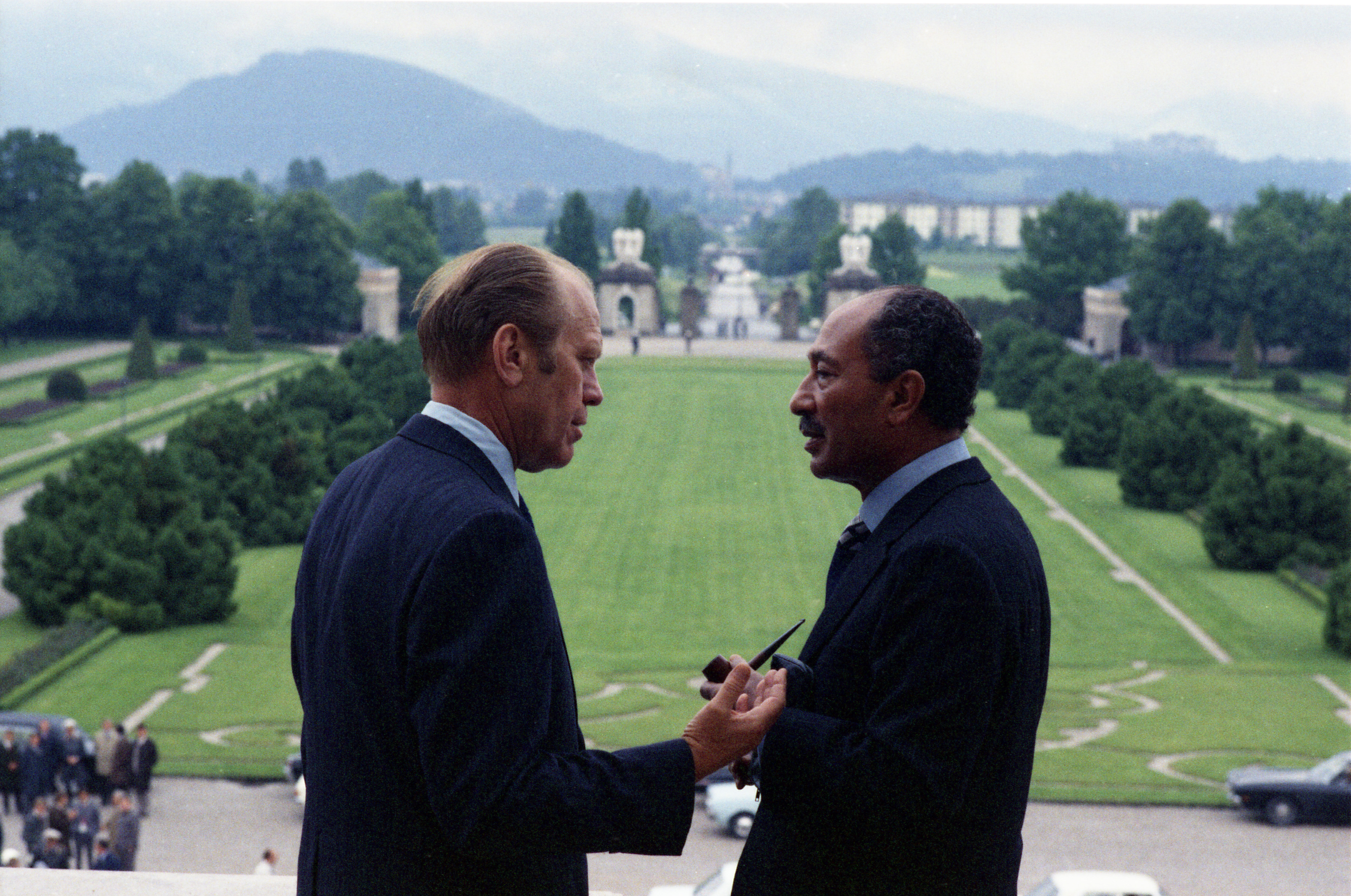
Ford with Egyptian President Anwar Sadat in Salzburg, Austria, June 1975

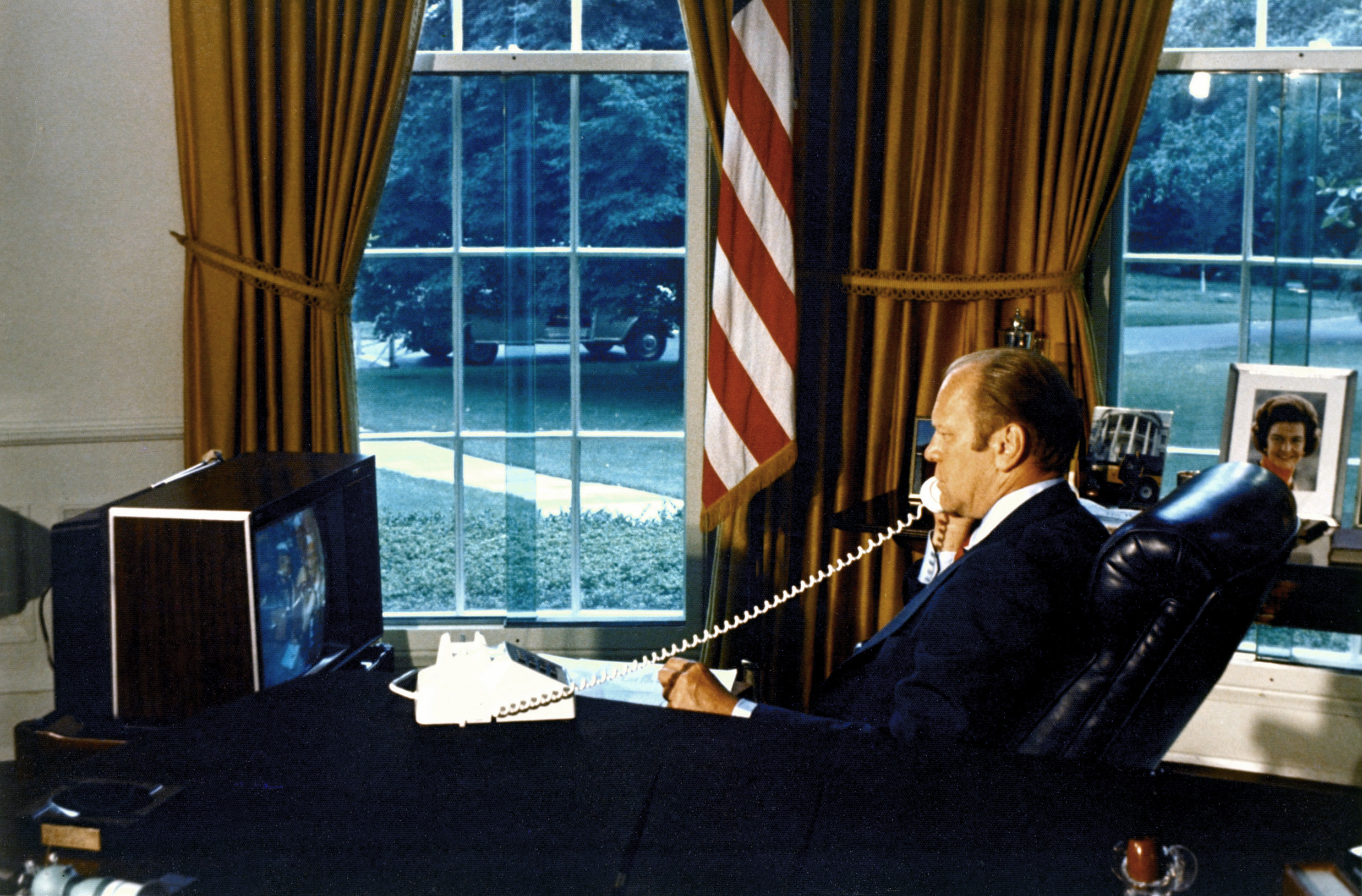
President Ford speaks to the Soviet and American Apollo–Soyuz Test Project crews, July 18, 1975

- May 28 – June 3 – Ford makes the fourth international trip of his presidency:
  - May 28–31 – Travels to Brussels, Belgium; attends the NATO Summit Meeting, addresses the North Atlantic Council and meets separately with NATO heads of state and government.
  - May 31 – June 1 – Travels to Madrid, Spain; meets with Generalissimo Francisco Franco, and receives the keys to the city of Madrid from mayor Miguel Angel García-Lomas Mata.

== June ==
  - June 1–3 – Travels to Salzburg, Austria; meets with Chancellor Bruno Kreisky and Egyptian President Anwar Sadat.
  - June 3 – Travels to Rome, Italy; meets with President Giovanni Leone and Prime Minister Aldo Moro.
  - June 3 – Visits the Apostolic Palace, Vatican City; has an audience with Pope Paul VI.

== July ==
- July 8 – Ford formally announces his candidacy for the 1976 Republican presidential nomination.
- July 15 – Apollo and Soyuz spacecraft launch within seven-and-a-half hours of each other, and dock together two days later. Known as the Apollo–Soyuz Test Project, it is the first joint U.S.–Soviet space flight. It would also be the last crewed U.S. space mission until the first Space Shuttle flight in April 1981.
- July 26 – August 4, 1975 – Ford makes the fifth international trip of his presidency:
  - July 26–28 – Travels to Bonn and Linz am Rhein, West Germany; meets with President Walter Scheel and Chancellor Helmut Schmidt.
  - July 28–29 – Travels to Warsaw and Kraków; meets with First Secretary Edward Gierek.
  - July 29 – August 2 – Travels to Helsinki, Finland; attends opening session of the Conference on Security and Cooperation in Europe. Ford meets with Soviet General Secretary Brezhnev, and joins leaders of 34 nations in signing the Final Act of the Conference.

== August ==
  - August 2–3 – Travels to Bucharest and Sinaia, Romania; meets with President Nicolae Ceaușescu.
  - August 3–4 – Travels to Belgrade, Yugoslavia; meets with President Josip Broz Tito and Prime Minister Džemal Bijedić.
  - August 10 – Betty Ford's August 1975 60 Minutes interview airs

== September ==
- September 1 – Ford announces a joint Egyptian-Israeli agreement on troop disengagement in the Sinai Peninsula. The agreement, signed in Geneva on September 4, 1975, is the culmination of 34 days of shuttle diplomacy by Secretary of State Henry Kissinger.

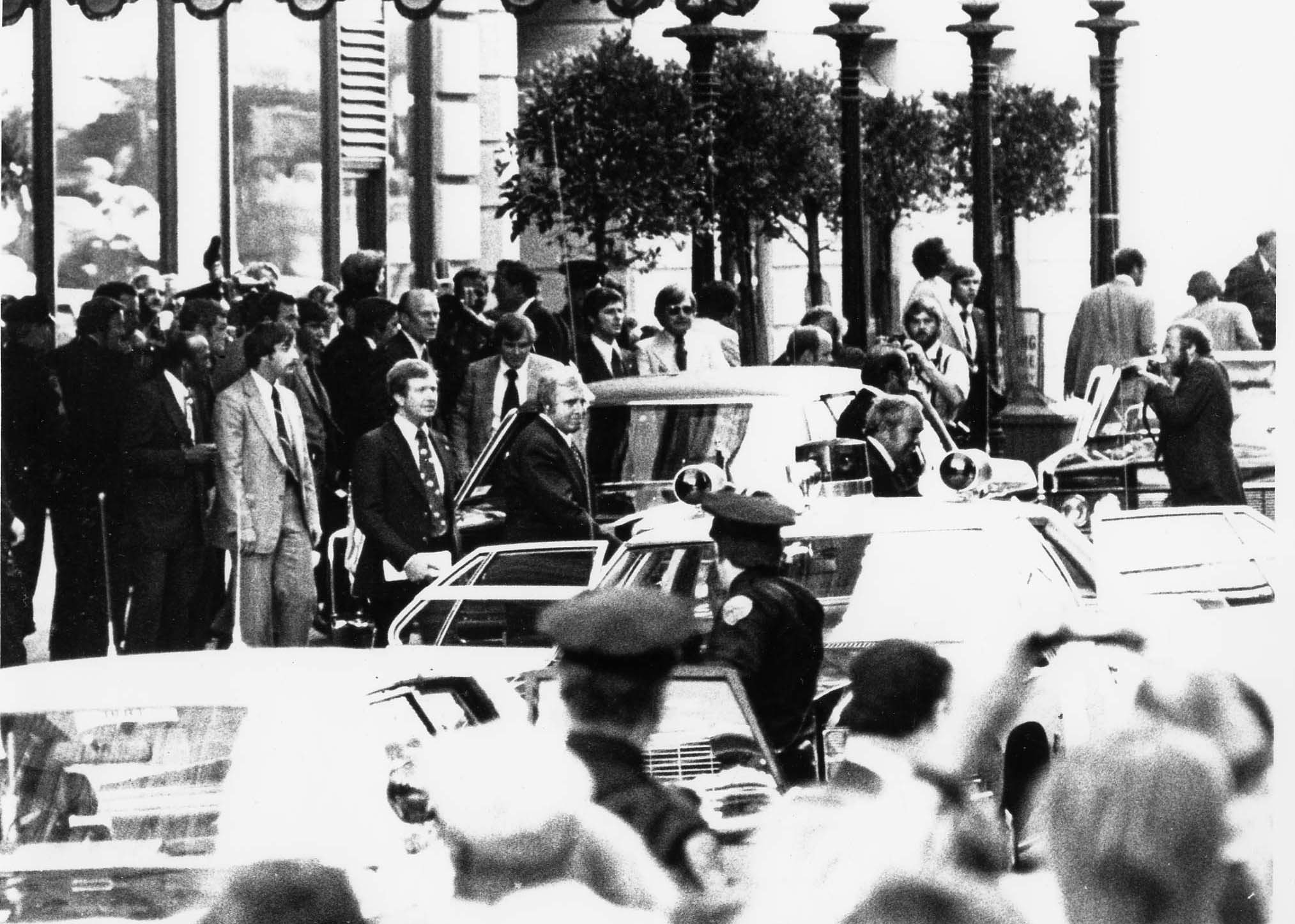
Reaction immediately after the second assassination attempt

- September 5 – Lynette "Squeaky" Fromme, a follower of Charles Manson, attempts to assassinate President Ford in Sacramento, California. She is later convicted of attempted assassination of the President and sentenced to life in prison. (She was paroled on August 14, 2009.)
- September 22 – Sara Jane Moore, a Patty Hearst fanatic, with ties to leftwing radical groups, attempts to assassinate President Ford as he left the St. Francis Hotel in downtown San Francisco, California. She is later convicted of attempted assassination of the President and sentenced to life in prison. (She was paroled on December 31, 2007.)

== October ==
- October 2–3 – Ford hosts Japanese Emperor Hirohito and Empress Nagako for a state visit. This is the first state visit for an Emperor and Empress of Japan to the United States.
- October 29 – Ford urges financial restraint and a financial review for New York City during its fiscal crisis. Ford refuses to support Federal help for New York at this time. He proposes bankruptcy legislation to ensure the City undergoes an orderly default process.

== November ==
- November 4 – In what the press dubs the Halloween Massacre, President Ford undertakes a reorganization of his Cabinet. The changes are:
  - Henry Kissinger is fired as National Security Advisor (but retains his post as Secretary of State), and replaced by General Brent Scowcroft;
  - William Colby is fired as Director of Central Intelligence and replaced by George H. W. Bush;
  - James Schlesinger is fired as Secretary of Defense and replaced by Chief of Staff Donald Rumsfeld;
  - Rumsfeld's deputy and protégé, Dick Cheney, moves up to be the Chief of Staff;
  - Additionally, under pressure from Republican Party Conservatives, Vice President Nelson Rockefeller withdraws his name from consideration as Ford's 1976 running mate.
- November 15–17 – Ford makes the sixth international trip of his presidency, travelling to Rambouillet, France, for the 1st G6 summit with President Valery Giscard d'Estaing of France, Chancellor Helmut Schmidt of West Germany, Prime Minister Aldo Moro of Italy, Prime Minister Takeo Miki of Japan, and Prime Minister Harold Wilson of the United Kingdom.
- November 20 – Former California Governor Ronald Reagan announces that he will challenge Gerald Ford for the 1976 Republican presidential nomination.
- November 26 – After he believes New York City leaders have begun to adequately address the city's financial crisis, Ford authorizes Congress to extend the city a line of credit.
- November 28 – Ford nominates Judge John Paul Stevens of the Seventh Circuit of the Court of Appeals to replace Associate Justice William O. Douglas. Stevens was confirmed by the United States Senate in a 98–0 vote on December 17, 1975, and sworn in two days later.
- November 30 – Ford signs the Education for All Handicapped Children Act of 1975, which established special education throughout the United States.

== December ==
- December 1–7 - Ford makes the seventh international trip of his presidency:
  - December 1–5 – Travels to Beijing, China; meets with Communist Party Chairman Mao Zedong and Vice Premier Deng Xiaoping to build momentum toward normalization of relations.
  - December 5–6 – Travels to Jakarta, Indonesia; meets with President Suharto.
  - December 6–7 – Travels to Manila, Philippines; meets with President Ferdinand Marcos.
- December 19 – Ford opposes the Tunney Amendments of the Defense Appropriations Bill but the Senate passes them 54–22. The amendments prohibit funding for U.S. activities aimed at defeating the Soviet and Cuban backed MPLA factions in the Angolan Civil War.
- December 22 – Ford signs the Energy Policy and Conservation Act, creating a comprehensive approach to federal energy policy in response to the 1973 oil crisis.

== See also ==
- Timeline of the Gerald Ford presidency, for an index of the Ford presidency timeline articles

U.S. presidential administration timelines
Preceded by Ford presidency (1974)	Ford presidency (1975)	Succeeded by Ford presidency (1976–1977)
