= Timeline of the Richard Nixon presidency (1974) =

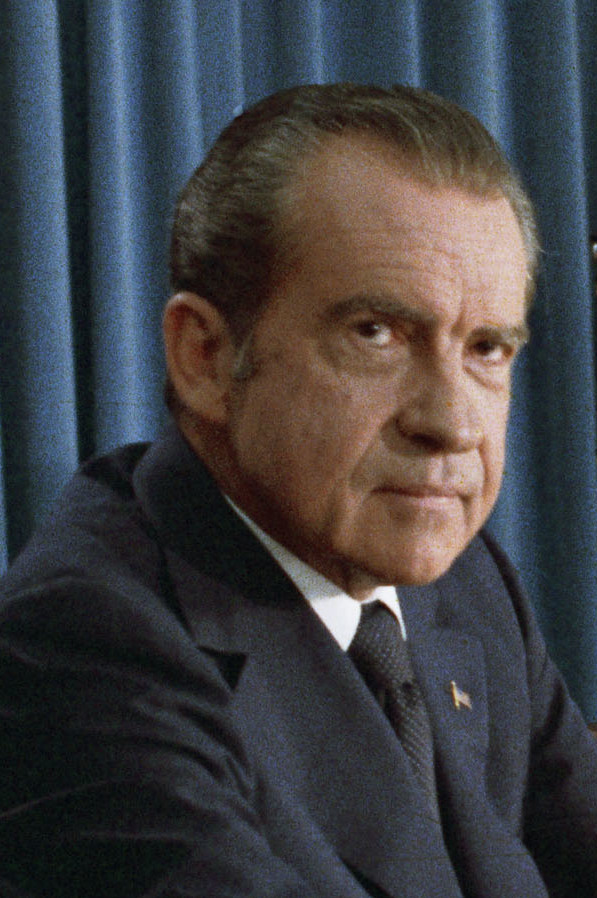
Nixon in 1974

The following is a timeline of the presidency of Richard Nixon from January 1, 1974, to August 9, 1974, when, in the face of almost certain impeachment and removal from office, he resigned the presidency (the first U.S. president ever to do so).

== January ==
- January 2 – President Nixon sets a new national speed limit with his signing of the Emergency Highway Energy Conservation Act, also forbidding the Department of Transportation from assisting projects in states not compliant with the law.
- January 3 – United States Secretary of State Henry Kissinger says President Nixon will be personally involved in resolving the oil dispute during a press conference.
- January 4 – President Nixon announces he will not turn over hundreds of tapes and documents requested by the Senate Watergate committee.
- January 5 – Bernard Barker says he was told of the White House plumber unit having telephone and radio communication tapes that proved the Soviet embassy had access to the Pentagon Papers.
- January 6 – Vice President Gerald Ford says he agrees with President Nixon's choice to not surrender the tapes and that a compromise may be possibly attained during an appearance on Meet the Press. Federal Energy Administrator William Simon says the Nixon administration thinks oil price reduction could occur during the spring.
- January 7 – White House sources reveal President Nixon has approved a budget with expenditures of US$300 billion.
- January 9 – President Nixon sends messages to Allied nations for the purpose of scheduling a February 11 meeting in Washington to address energy conflicts of an international scale. White House Chief of Staff Alexander Haig states President Nixon does not intend to devote any additional personal time to the Watergate scandal.
- January 11 – The Western White House confirms the intentional leak of information kept by the National Security Council. Secretary of State Kissinger meets with President of Egypt Anwar Sadat in Aswan, Egypt during the evening.
- January 12 – Secretary of State Kissinger meets with Prime Minister of Israel Golda Meir in Jerusalem.
- January 14 – Justice Department attorneys offer a private look by a federal judge into the documents by Morton Halperin, a former aide to then-National Security Advisor Kissinger. Assistant to the President Peter Flanigan says the US economy will continue growth within the year though possibly at a slowed pace while speaking at the American Farm Bureau Federation's 55th annual meeting.
- January 16 – The FBI is ordered by Special Watergate Prosecutor Leon Jaworski to investigate erasures on a Watergate tape recording.
- January 17 – The Federal District Court discloses Stephen Bull asked John Dean if he had knowledge of the Nixon recordings shortly after Dean's public announcement.
- January 18 – Federal Judge John Sirica urges a grand jury investigation of possible illegal tampering with tapped White House conversations on Watergate. White House sources say President Nixon has decided to change the personnel of his administration, including replacing Press Secretary Ronald Ziegler.
- January 19 – President Nixon appears in a fifteen-minute broadcast to speak on energy and gasoline usage.
- January 20 – It is learned that President Nixon has postponed his State of the Union address to avoid conflicts with him attending a congressional dinner.
- January 22 – Secretary of State Kissinger reports his expectations that the ending of the Arab oil embargo will occur prior to Israel and Egypt ending their troop engagement in the Suez Canal.
- January 24 – President Nixon sends Congress a special message in which he says the new budget would require spending US$7.6 billion on education.
- January 25 – It is reported Treasury Secretary Shultz has decided to resign and two friends mention he will be out of the administration by either March 15 or April 1.
- January 28 – First Lady Pat Nixon denies reports that President Nixon has been recently experiencing sleeping problems during an appearance in the state dining room of the White House. President Nixon sends a special message to Congress in which he requests US$13.6 billion for veteran benefits for the following fiscal year.
- January 29 – John Ehrlichman requests President Nixon be subpoenaed as a material witness for the former's trial for burglary and conspiracy in a motion made by Ehrlichman's attorney Douglas Dalton. United States Secretary of Treasury George P. Shultz says President Nixon resigning or being impeached is unlikely during a press conference.
- January 30 – President Nixon delivers the 1974 State of the Union Address to a joint session of Congress.

== February ==
- February 1 – President Nixon proposes a flexible economic blueprint for the year to both stimulate the economy in a prevention of large unemployment and cause a lessening of inflationary pressures.
- February 2 – The Justice Department proposes legislation for the purpose of restricting arrest record dissemination as well as information also held in data banks.
- February 3 – Treasury Secretary Shultz says a fall from 9% to below 5% in the annual rate of inflation will occur in the latter part of the year during an interview.
- February 4 – President Nixon submits a US$301.4 billion budget to Congress for the following fiscal year.
- February 5 – United States Secretary of Defense James R. Schlesinger indicates the US may enter another nuclear arms race with the Soviet Union during an address to the Senate Armed Services Committee.
- February 6 – President Nixon calls on quick decisiveness by Congress on the Comprehensive Health Insurance Plan.
- February 7 – President Nixon transmits the "third annual report of each Executive department and agency on their activities during fiscal year 1973 under the Uniform Relocation Assistance and Real Property Acquisition Policies Act of 1970."
- February 8 – President Nixon issues a memorandum on the annual report on Federal Executive Boards.
- February 9 – President Nixon delivers an address on negotiations toward ending independent truck stoppages to reporters while in the Oval Office at the White House during the morning. President Nixon delivers a radio address on transportation legislation in the Oval Office during the afternoon.

== March ==
- March 1 – A grand jury indicts former Nixon advisors John Mitchell, H. R. Halderman, John Ehrlichman, and Charles Colson as well as three others on charges of conspiracy, obstruction of justice, and lying in the ongoing Watergate investigation. The White House releases a statement saying President Nixon is hoping for a hasty conclusion in determining a resolution.
- March 4 – Treasury Secretary Schultz calls for Congress to not compare American trade with communist countries to the administration loosening prior policies on Soviet immigration while speaking to the Senate Finance Committee. The White House releases 150 million in federal highway funds for the previous year.
- March 6 – President Nixon vetoes the Energy Emergency Act. President Nixon holds a televised and radio broadcast news conference in the East Room at the White House during the evening.
- March 7 – President Nixon signs the Water Resources Development Act of 1974.
- March 8 – President Nixon delivers a radio address on the subject of campaign reform legislation proposals by Congress in the Oval Office during the afternoon.
- March 19 – President Nixon announces the Arab oil embargo lifting during a session to the National Association of Broadcasters.
- March 21 – Secretary of State Kissinger says the following week's Moscow trip is coming amidst a challenging time for American relations with the Soviets during a press conference. President Nixon announces his selection of Robert Strausz-Hupé for United States Ambassador to Sweden.
- March 22 – The Nixon administration announces clean air legislation delaying certain deadlines and permits during a press conference.
- March 25 – The White House agrees to the requesting of two lawyers, who helped with President Nixon's taxes, for the waiving of the lawyer-client relationship so the duo can detail to Congress a dialogue they had with President Nixon about a tax deduction four years ago.
- March 27 – President Nixon delivers an address at a Washington fundraising dinner in which he predicts Republicans will perform well in the midterm elections.
- March 28 – The White House says President Nixon will only not veto the Consumer Protection Agency bill if the bill is rewritten to better align with business and industry.
- March 29 – The White House says President Nixon will surrender evidence subpoenaed by Watergate special prosecutor Jaworski.

== June ==
- June 1 – President Nixon meets with Secretary General Kurt Waldheim at the White House during the morning.
- June 3 – Informed sources state President Nixon's scheduled weeklong trip to the Middle East will include stops to Egypt, Israel, Syria, Saudi Arabia, and Jordan.
- June 4 – The White House and Justice Department announce the abolition of the Red Scare-era list containing subversive organizations kept by the Attorney General and meant to assist with government job applicants.
- June 16 – President Nixon makes the first ever US presidential trip to Israel.

== July ==
- July 7 – President Nixon travels from Key Biscayne to Palm Beach, Florida during the morning to inspect the Mar-a-Lago estate.
- July 8 – The United States Customs Court rules President Nixon exceeded his authority in authorizing a surcharge of 10% on dutiable imports during 1971.
- July 10 – Judge Gerhard A. Gesell reads aloud President Nixon's testimony during the defense trial of Ehrlichman.
- July 11 – President Nixon announces his nomination of United States District Court Judge Murray I. Gurfein for judge of the Court of Appeals for the Second Circuit. Assistant Special Watergate Prosecutor Richard Benveniste discloses the discovery of an additional gap in the recordings of White House presidential conversations.
- July 18 – President Nixon states his intent to finish his second term despite impeachment efforts in a telephone message to supporters.
- July 19 – President Nixon announces the nomination of associate F.A.A. administrator James E. Dow today to be deputy administrator of the Federal Aviation Administration.
- July 26 – President Nixon signs the Emergency Livestock Credit Act of 1974 into law.
- July 27 – President Nixon presents the Medal of Freedom of Charles LeRoy Lowman at the Western White House during the morning.
- July 29 – A second recommendation of President Nixon's impeachment is approved by the House Judiciary Committee in a vote of 28 to 10. Former United States Secretary of Treasury John Connally is indicted on charges of pocketing $10,000 from Jake Jacobsen in exchange for changing pricing on milk.
- July 30 – President Nixon issues Executive Order 11796, furthering regulations on exports. The White House issues a statement favorable of the signing of a Cyprus international agreement.
- July 31 – The White House admits the House of Representatives will impeach President Nixon barring a large shift in voting. President Nixon issues Proclamation 4305, designating the week beginning on the upcoming October 20 as "National Forest Products Week".

== August ==
- August 2 – Nixon tells his family of his intention to resign from the presidency. President Nixon's lawyers surrender an additional 13 tapes of Watergate conversations to District Judge John Sirica.
- August 4 – President Nixon meets with aides and speechwriters at Camp David.
- August 6 – Governor of California Ronald Reagan urges President Nixon to speak truthfully before Congress during a news conference.
- August 7 – Secretary of State Henry Kissinger informs President Nixon of the administration's belief that he should resign "in the national interest."
- August 8 – President Nixon announces his intention to resign the presidency.
- August 9 – Nixon resigns the presidency. Gerald Ford becomes the 38th president of the United States.
