= Timeline of the Gerald Ford presidency (1976–1977) =

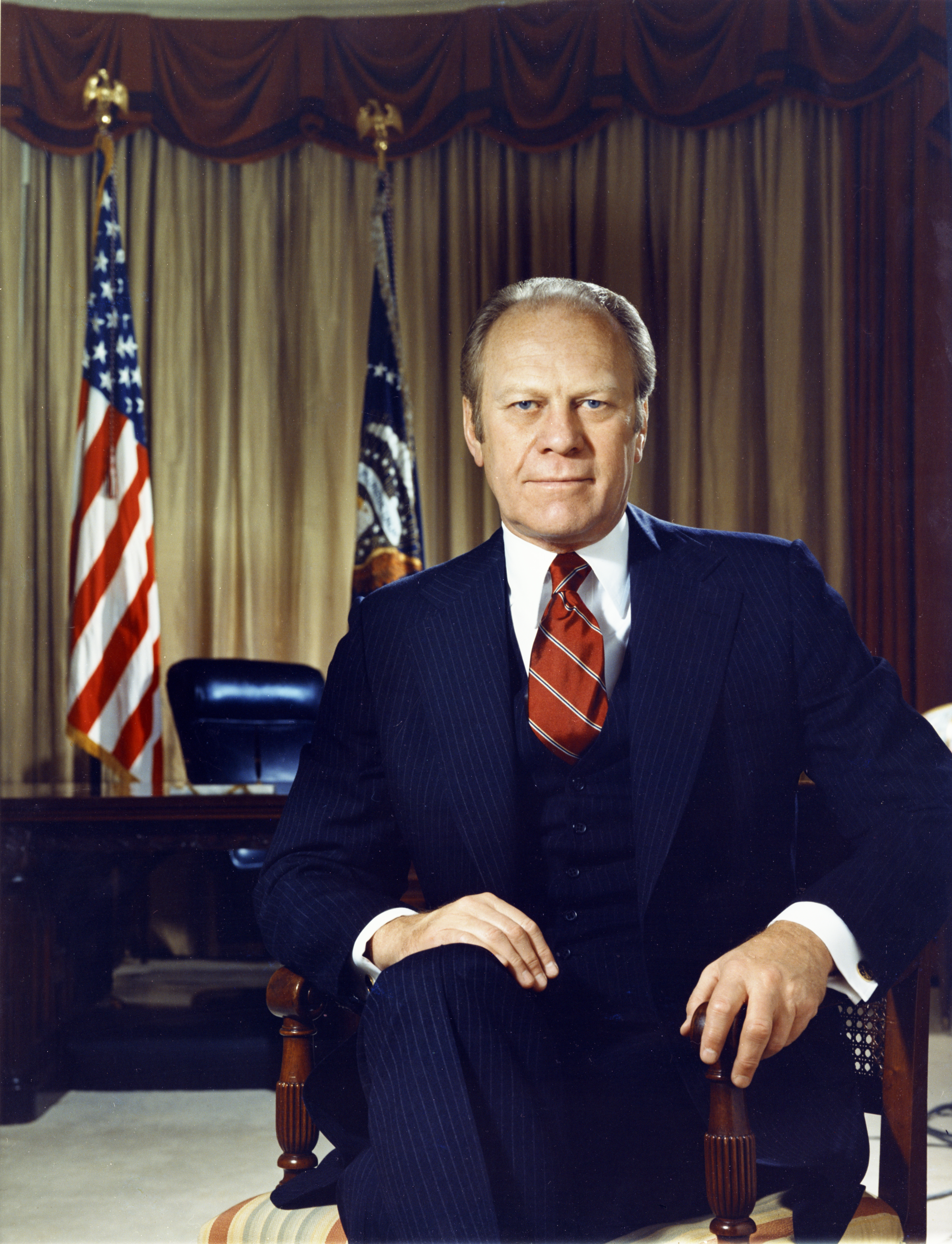
Ford in 1976

The following is a timeline of the presidency of Gerald Ford from January 1, 1976, to January 20, 1977.

== January ==
- January 2 – Facing stiff opposition from a surging Ronald Reagan in the run-up to the 1976 Republican primaries and a more assertive Republican right wing, President Ford vetoes the Common Situs Picketing Bill, which would have amended National Labor Relations Act rules regarding union recognition, organizing and the rights to picket.
- January 31 – John Dunlop resigns as Secretary of Labor and is replaced by William Usery Jr.

== February ==
- February 6 – President Ford signs Executive Order 11904 establishing the Defense Superior Service Medal, to be awarded to members of the United States Armed Forces (most often presented to senior officers in the flag and general officer grades, followed by a lesser number of Colonels and USN and USCG Captains) who perform "superior meritorious service in a position of significant responsibility".
- February 18 – In an effort to reform the United States Intelligence Community, President Ford signs Executive Order 11905 to "establish policies to improve the quality of intelligence needed for national security, to clarify the authority and responsibilities of the intelligence departments and agencies, and to establish effective oversight to assure compliance with law in the management and direction of intelligence agencies and departments of the national government." This executive order also prohibits the United States from engaging in political assassination.
- February 26 – President Ford edges Ronald Reagan by 1,250 votes in the New Hampshire primary, taking 17 of 21 delegates. This begins a string of primary victories for Ford which include Florida and Illinois before a series of losses to challenger Reagan in North Carolina, Texas, Georgia, Alabama, and Indiana.

== March ==
- March 25 – President Ford sends a message to Congress requesting a special appropriation for the National Swine Flu Immunization Program, in order to immunize 200 million-plus people against a feared swine flu outbreak. He signs the measure into law on August 12, 1976.

== April ==
- April 16 – President Ford solves an inter agency dispute in favor of quickly building the first strategic oil reserve as protection against foreign embargoes.

== May ==
- May 15 – President Ford becomes the first President since Harry Truman to campaign by train as he crosses southern Michigan prior to that state's presidential primary.

== June ==
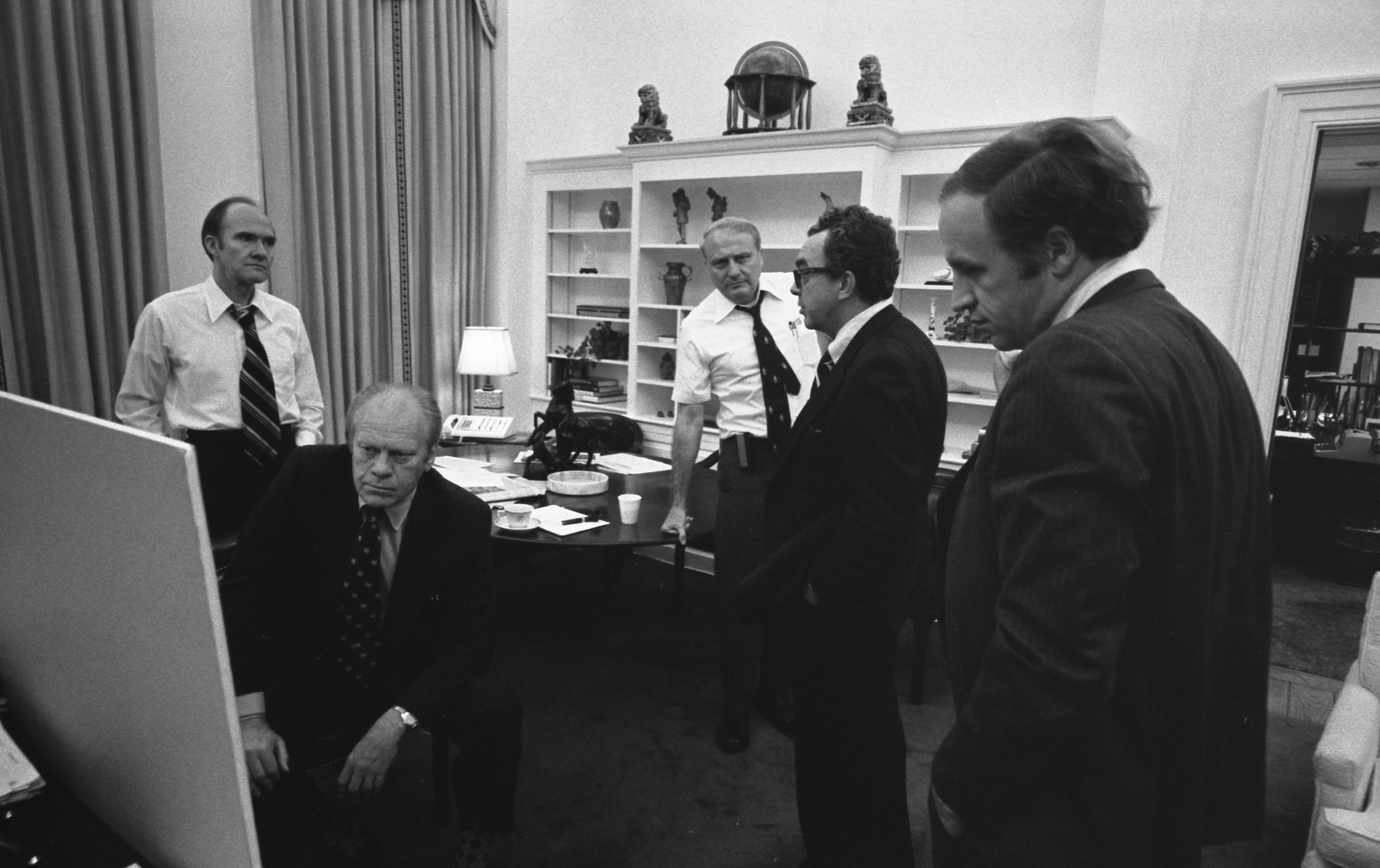
President Ford monitors the evacuation of American citizens from Beirut, Lebanon, June 20, 1976

- June 11 – President Ford signs Executive Order 11921 adjusting emergency preparedness assignments amongst Federal departments and agencies.
- June 16 – Francis E. Meloy, Jr., the incoming U.S. Ambassador to Lebanon, along with Robert Waring, the U.S. Economic Counselor, and their driver, Zuhair Mohammed Moghrabi, are kidnapped by Popular Front for the Liberation of Palestine members as they cross the Green Line, the division between Beirut's Christian and Muslim sectors. The bullet-riddled bodies of Meloy and Waring are found later that day on a beach in Ramlet al-Baida.
- June 17 – President Ford meets with CIA Director George H.W. Bush, Chief of Staff Dick Cheney and Special Emissary to Lebanon L. Dean Brown, and others, during a meeting of the National Security Council to discuss the evacuation of Americans from Beirut, the capital of Lebanon. The following day, an initial group of approximately 200 American and Lebanese Nationals are evacuated.
- June 20 – President Ford orders the evacuation of American citizens from Lebanon. That day, 110 Americans and 157 nationals of other countries are transported from Lebanon to Piraeus, Greece aboard USS Spiegel Grove. Approximately 300 additional persons, including around 150 Americans, are evacuated on July 27, aboard USS Coronado, and also taken to Piraeus Greece.

== July ==
United States Bicentennial logo commissioned by the American Revolution Bicentennial Commission.

- July 4 – America's Bicentennial of independence. The year is marked by numerous head of state visits and state gifts to the United States. On July 4, President Ford attends events at Valley Forge National Historical Park, Pennsylvania; Operation Sail in New York City; and in Philadelphia, Pennsylvania.
- July 7 – President and Mrs. Ford welcome Queen Elizabeth II of the United Kingdom and Prince Philip, Duke of Edinburgh to the White House for a state dinner as part of the Bicentennial celebration.

== August ==
- August 18 – When North Korean soldiers axe-murder two U.S. soldiers on a tree-pruning mission in the Korean Demilitarized Zone, the President and his advisors consider a strong military response, but decide on other measures to chasten North Korea, but without causing further escalation.
- August 19 – President Ford is nominated for a full term as president at the Republican Convention, held in Kemper Arena in Kansas City, Missouri, edging out former California Governor Ronald Reagan. United States Senator Robert Dole of Kansas is nominated for Vice President.

== September ==
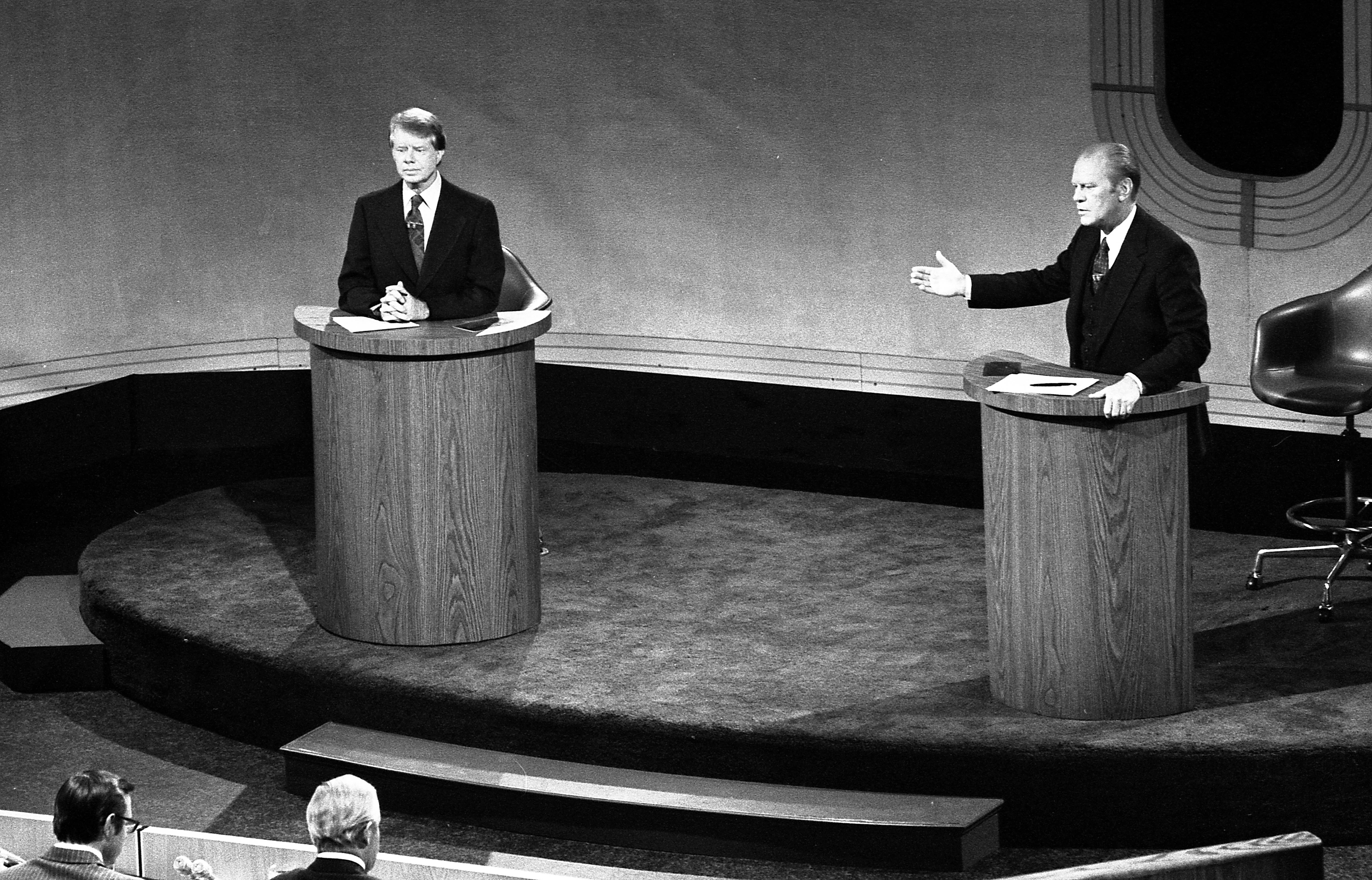
Carter and Ford debate domestic policy at the Walnut Street Theatre in Philadelphia, September 23, 1976.

- September 13 – President Ford signs the Government in the Sunshine Act requiring that many government regulatory agencies must give advance notice of meetings and hold open meetings. The new law also amends the Freedom of Information Act "by narrowing the authority of agencies to withhold information from the public."
- September 15 – President Ford kicks off his general election campaign at the University of Michigan in Ann Arbor, Michigan.
- September 23 – First presidential candidate debate between President Ford and Governor Jimmy Carter, domestic policy, at the Walnut Street Theatre in Philadelphia. This is the first presidential candidate debate since the Nixon-Kennedy debates in 1960.
- September 30 – The Hart–Scott–Rodino Antitrust Improvements Act, a set of amendments to the antitrust laws of the United States, principally the Clayton Antitrust Act, is signed into law by President Ford.

== October ==
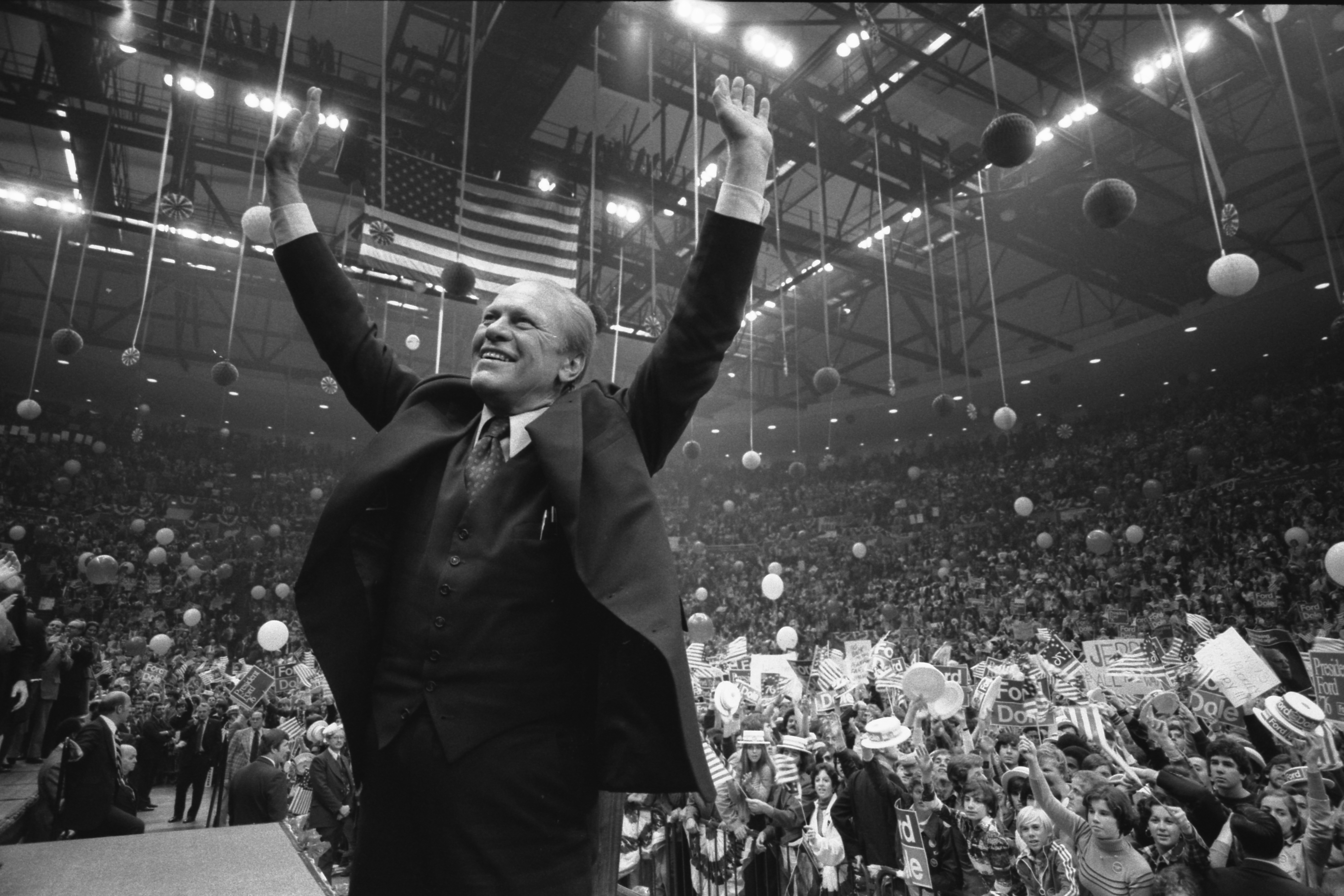
Ford campaigns at the Nassau Coliseum in Hempstead, New York, October 31, 1976

- October 6 – Second presidential candidate debate, on foreign policy and defense issues, in San Francisco. During the debate President Ford comments that, "there is no Soviet domination of Eastern Europe and there never will be under a Ford administration." This misstatement is fodder for the press and public for the next several days.
- October 11 – President Ford signs the Toxic Substances Control Act.
- October 14 – President Ford receives a swine flu inoculation from his White House physician, Dr. William Lukash.
- October 21 – President Ford signs the Resource Conservation and Recovery Act.
- October 22 – Third and final presidential candidate debate in Williamsburg, Virginia.

== November ==
- November 1 – President Ford attends his final campaign rally in Grand Rapids, Michigan at the Pantlind Hotel.
- November 2 – President Ford casts his vote and attends the unveiling of the Gerald R. Ford mural by artist Paul Collins at the Kent County Airport before returning to Washington.
- November 3 – President Ford concedes the presidential election to Jimmy Carter of Georgia. Ford loses the Electoral College 297–240 and receives 39,147,793 votes (48% of the votes cast) to Carter's 40,830,763 (50.1% of the votes cast).
- November 22 – President Ford meets with President-elect Carter in the Oval Office to discuss the transition of presidential power.

== December ==
- December 14 – President Ford sends a letter to the Archivist of the United States and the President of the University of Michigan offering to deposit his papers in a Presidential Library to be built on the University of Michigan campus.

== January (1977) ==
- January 12 – In his final State of the Union Address, President Ford tells Congress and the American People, "I can report that the state of the union is good. There is room for improvement, as always, but today we have a more perfect Union than when my stewardship began."
- January 19 – President Ford signs Executive Order 11965 establishing the Humanitarian Service Medal, to be awarded to members of the Armed Forces of the United States who, after April 1, 1975, distinguished themselves by meritorious direct participation in a United States Department of Defense approved significant military act or operation of a humanitarian nature.
- January 20 – Jimmy Carter is inaugurated as the 39th president of the United States. In his inaugural address, Carter states, "For myself and for our Nation, I want to thank my predecessor for all he has done to heal our land."

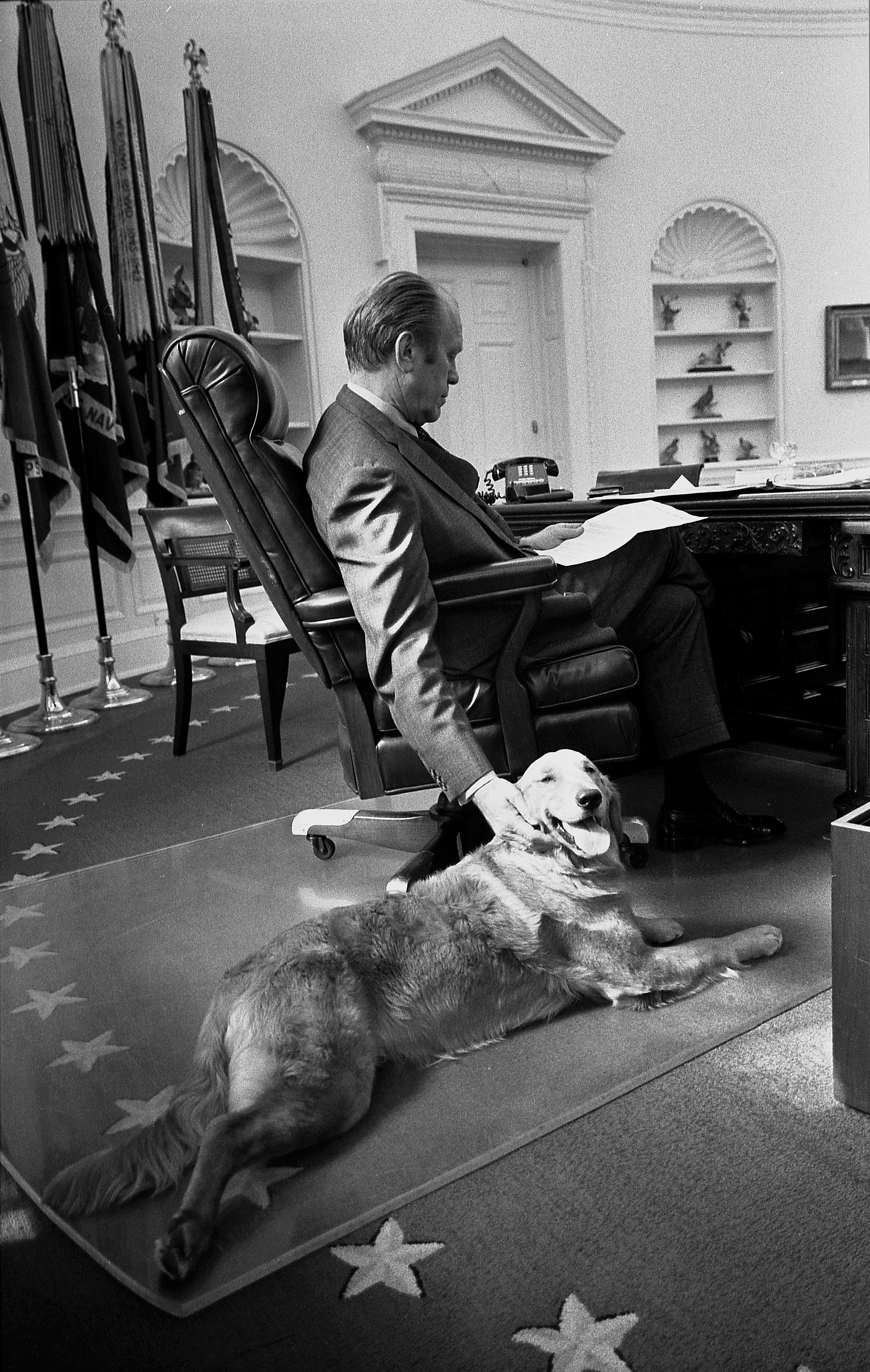
Ford and his Golden Retriever, Liberty, in the Oval Office, 1974

== See also ==
- Timeline of the Gerald Ford presidency, for an index of the Ford presidency timeline articles

U.S. presidential administration timelines
Preceded by Ford presidency (1975)	Ford presidency (1976–1977)	Succeeded by Carter presidency (1977)
