= Timeline of the Ronald Reagan presidency (1988–1989) =

The following is a timeline of the presidency of Ronald Reagan from January 1, 1988, to January 20, 1989.

== January 1988 ==
- January 2 – President Reagan co-signs the Canada–United States Free Trade Agreement.
- January 25 – President Reagan delivers the 1988 State of the Union Address to a joint session of Congress.

== February ==
- February 3 – The Senate confirms Anthony Kennedy as an Associate Justice of the Supreme Court in a vote of 97–0.

== May ==
- May 29 – June 3 – President Reagan attends the Moscow Summit.

== June ==
- June 6 – President Reagan says the US and the Soviet Union have a new "dimension of trust and cooperation" thanks to his Moscow Summit trip and praises Gorbachev for the "real changes" he has brought about in the Soviet Union.

== August ==
- August 10 – President Reagan signs the Civil Liberties Act of 1988.
- August 23 – President Reagan signs the Omnibus Foreign Trade and Competitiveness Act.

== October ==
- October 13 – President Reagan signs the Family Support Act.

== November ==
- November 9 – President Reagan meets with President-elect Bush at the Oval Office to discuss the transition of power.
- November 10 – President Reagan signs the Undetectable Firearms Act.

== December ==
- December 7 – President Reagan attends the Governors Island Summit.

== January 1989 ==
- January 4 – In a joint session of the United States Congress, the results for the electoral college are counted. In his role as President of the Senate, Vice President George H. W. Bush reads the results and declares himself as the winner of the 1988 presidential election.
- January 7 – President Reagan undergoes surgery at Walter Reed Army Medical Center.
- January 11 – President Reagan delivers his farewell address in the Oval Office.
- January 20 – President Reagan completes his two terms in office and leaves the White House for the final time as Commander-in-chief.
- January 20 – George H. W. Bush is inaugurated as the 41st president of the United States, at noon EST.
- January 20 – After the inauguration, Reagan, now the former president, returns to Los Angeles to began his post-presidency.

U.S. presidential administration timelines
Preceded by Reagan presidency (1987)	Reagan presidency (1988–1989)	Succeeded by Bush presidency (1989)
