= Timeline of the Richard Nixon presidency =

The presidency of Richard Nixon began on January 20, 1969, when Richard Nixon was inaugurated as the 37th president of the United States, and ended on August 9, 1974, when, in the face of almost certain impeachment and removal from office, he resigned the presidency (the first U.S. president ever to do so).

== 1972 ==
- January 2 – President Nixon explains his ordering of bombing within North Vietnam was due to a violation of a 1968 understanding that ceased bombing by the US during a nationally televised interview.
- January 3 – Jack Anderson claims that United States Secretary of State Henry Kissinger complained about President Nixon giving him "hell every half hour" in regards to the India-Pakistan conflict and that Kissinger said this during a December 3, 1971 strategy session.
- January 4 – President Nixon pledges the US will become the leading maritime country in the world while speaking at a shipbuilding yard in San Diego, California.
- January 11 – President Nixon signs an executive order alongside issuing a memoranda setting ordering pay increases to over 118,000 federal blue collar workers.
- January 13 – President Nixon announces the withdrawal of 70,000 American troops over the course of the next three months in a statement during the White House press briefing.
- January 20 – President Nixon delivers the 1972 State of the Union Address to a joint session of Congress.
- January 28 – President Nixon announces the creation of an Office of Drug Law Enforcement within the Justice Department for the overseeing of jailing of illicit drug dealers.
- January 29 – A White House source discloses that President Nixon was known as "Quarterback" in messages sent to Secretary of State Kissinger during negotiations with North Vietnam.
- January 30 – United States Secretary of Defense Melvin Laird says a draft call will not take place until at least April during a televised interview.
- February 21 – 1972 visit by Richard Nixon to China
- May 22 – President Nixon visits the Soviet Union.
- October 18 – Clean Water Act
- November 7 – President Nixon wins re-election against Senator George McGovern from South Dakota, the Democratic candidate.
- December 1 – The White House discloses that Treasury Secretary Schultz will remain in his position during the second term of President Nixon with expanded responsibilities.
- December 2 – Interior Secretary Morton strips the supervision rights of the three men involved in Indian affairs alongside announcing his taking of personal command of the endeavor.
- December 4 – The government announces the withholding of 689 million in federal welfare payments as part of an effort to dislocate those not needing the program from those eligible.
- December 26 – Former President Harry S. Truman dies

== 1973 ==
- January 1 – The Labor Department states its choice to raise guidelines on income for the determining of who is eligible for federal programs and specifies the raise as US$193 higher.
- January 2 – The Pentagon states American bombers possibly damaged a North Vietnam hospital and the a civilian airport in Hanoi following the Hanoi-Haiphong area bombing.
- January 3 – Press Secretary Ronald Ziegler states members of Congress should consider the possibility of convincing the North Vietnamese of their interest in acting against peace efforts.
- January 4 – President Nixon holds a meeting with military and diplomatic advisors in the Oval Office for discussions on Vietnam and the upcoming Paris peace talks.
- January 5 – President Nixon meets with Democratic and Republican congressional leaders for a breakfast to inform them the US should know whether a quick settlement in Vietnam is possible after the Paris peace talks.
- January 6 – The House and Senate jointly officiate the re-election of President Nixon and Vice President Spiro Agnew to a second term during a ceremony.
- January 8 – United States Secretary of Defense Melvin R. Laird says 5,000 men will be drafted between March 1 and July 1 during an appearance before Congress.
- January 9 – The Defense Department denies allegations made in a Saigon report that the US had resumed preemptive reaction air strikes over North Vietnam. The White House announces President Nixon's acceptance of the resignation of Chairman of the Federal Trade Commission Miles Kirkpatrick.
- January 11 – President Nixon reveals Phase 3 in a message to Congress which eliminates a majority of wage and price controls.
- January 12 – The White House says Cabinet members will resume testifying before Congress and their upcoming appearances will be at convenience.
- January 14 – President Nixon sends United States Army General Alexander Haig to meet with President of South Vietnam Nguyễn Văn Thiệu.
- January 16 – White House Press Secretary Ronald Ziegler says United States Secretary of State Henry Kissinger will not return to the Paris peace talks ahead of the following week. South Vietnamese sources state President Nixon intends to declare a unilateral Vietnam cease-fire to start on the eve of his second inauguration.
- January 17 – White House sources rebuke claims of an imminent cease-fire, citing earlier statements that President Nixon would not address peace negotiations during the week.
- January 18 – The Florida White House announces Secretary of State Kissinger will return to the Paris peace talks for a completion of "the text of an agreement".
- January 19 – Defense Secretary Laird says he cannot confirm the use of a cease-fire being effective in ending the Southeast Asia conflict during a Pentagon press conference. Press Secretary Ziegler states President Nixon will have more press conference beginning with his second term.
- January 20 – Nixon is sworn into his second term as President of the United States by Supreme Court Chief Justice Warren E. Burger.
- January 22 – Former President Lyndon B. Johnson dies
- January 27 – Paris Peace Accords
- June 22 – Agreement on the Prevention of Nuclear War
- July 18 – The White House Taping system is disconnected for the final time, after its public revelation in testimony by White House Aide Alexander Butterfield
- October 6 – The Yom Kippur War begins, which sparked the 1973 oil crisis, leading to the 1970s energy crisis.
- October 10 – Spiro Agnew resigns as Vice President.
- October 12 – Nixon nominates House minority leader Gerald Ford for Vice President.
- November 5 – The term "Shuttle diplomacy" is first used to describe the efforts of Secretary of State Henry Kissinger to facilitate the cessation of hostilities following the Yom Kippur War.
- December 4–5 – President of Romania Nicolae Ceausescu meets with President Nixon for discussions on the development of economic relations between Romania and the United States.
- December 4 – President Nixon delivers an address in a formal welcome of President Ceausescu to the White House on the South Lawn during the morning.
- December 6 – Following congressional approval, Gerald Ford is sworn in as the 40th vice president of the United States. President Nixon signs H.R. 9474, a veterans disability and death pension bill, during an Oval Office ceremony.

== See also ==
- Timeline of the Lyndon B. Johnson presidency, for his predecessor
- Timeline of the Gerald Ford presidency, for his successor
