= Timeline of the Gerald Ford presidency =

Gerald Ford, a Republican from Michigan, was inaugurated as the nation's 38th president on August 9, 1974, upon the resignation of Richard Nixon, and ended on January 20, 1977. The following articles cover the timeline of Ford's presidency, and the time leading up to it:

- Presidency: 1974–1977
  - Timeline of the Gerald Ford presidency (1974)
  - Timeline of the Gerald Ford presidency (1975)
  - Timeline of the Gerald Ford presidency (1976–1977)
- Post-presidency of Gerald Ford: 1977–2006

== See also ==
- Timeline of the Richard Nixon presidency, for his predecessor
- Timeline of the Jimmy Carter presidency, for his successor
