= Timeline of the Lyndon B. Johnson presidency (1967) =

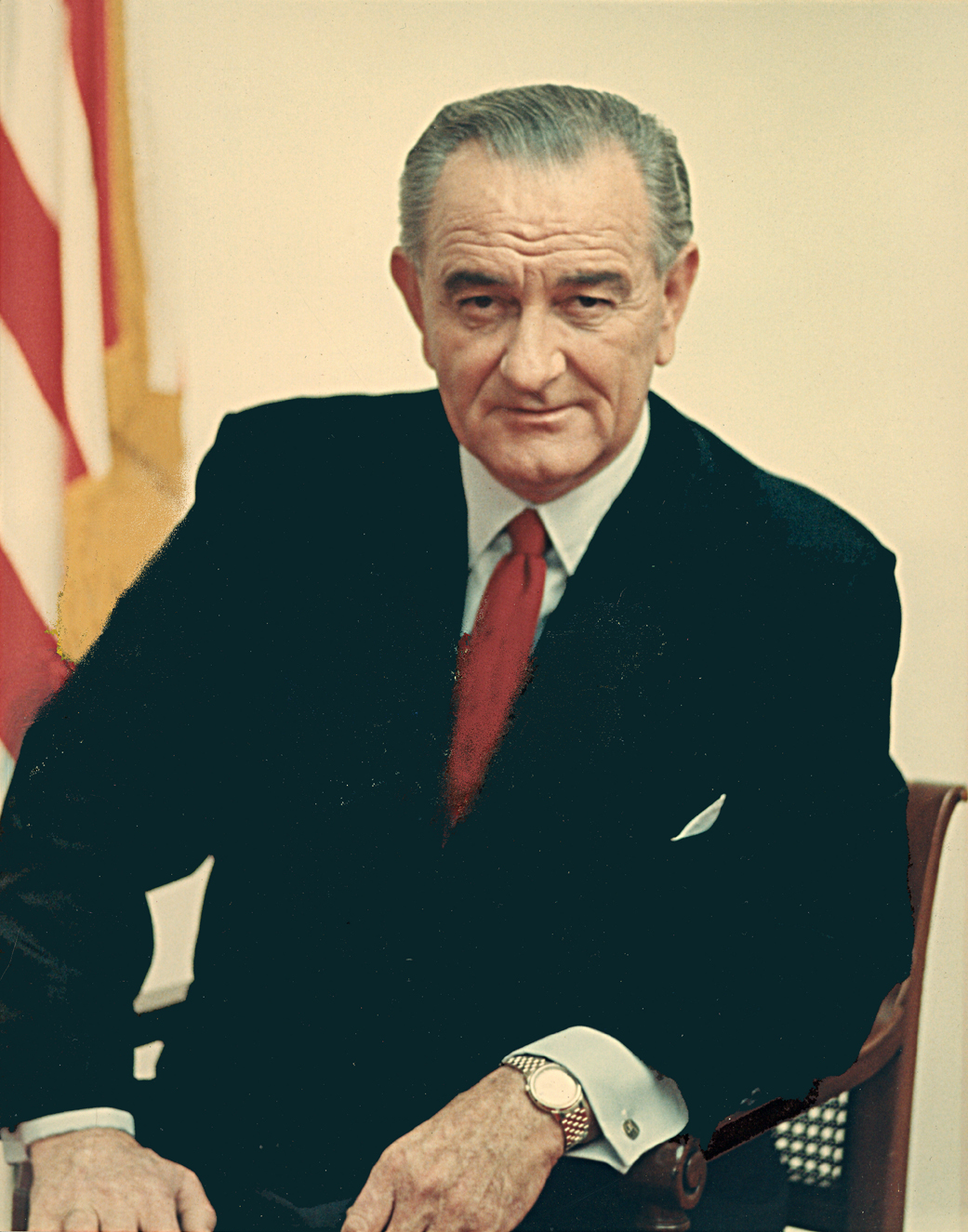
Johnson in 1967

The following is a timeline of the presidency of Lyndon B. Johnson from January 1, 1967, to December 31, 1967.

== January ==
- January 5 – President Johnson attends a meeting of the Lyndon B. Johnson Australian Science Scholars in the Cabinet Room.
- January 5 – President Johnson signs Executive Order 11322, effectively prohibiting measures related to trade and other transactions with Southern Rhodesia.
- January 6 – President Johnson signs Proclamation 3760, inviting Americans to participate in the observance of February 1967 as "American History Month" and partake in activities of recognition of the occasion.
- January 10 – President Johnson delivers the 1967 State of the Union Address to a joint session of Congress.
- January 10 – President Johnson issues a statement on the death of Rhode Island representative John E. Fogarty.
- January 11 – President Johnson signs Proclamation 3761, intended to correct errors on tariff schedules and terminations of increases on watch movements.
- January 11 – President Johnson signs Proclamation 3762, reducing duties on sheet glass imports.
- January 12 – In a statement, President Johnson announces "one of our most distinguished statesmen and economists – Senator Paul H. Douglas –will head a Commission of distinguished citizens to make the thorough study of our cities and urban areas I recommended to the Congress in my 1965 message on the American city and which the Congress approved in 1966."
- January 16 – Alan Stephenson Boyd is sworn in as the 1st United States Secretary of Transportation in the East Room.
- January 17 – President Johnson attends a White House dinner in honor of the Vice President, Speaker of the House, Chief Justice, and Majority and Minority leaders in the Senate in the State Dining Room.
- January 17 – President Johnson holds his ninety-fourth news conference in his White House office, answering questions on the budget and economic messages, cutbacks in programs and expenditures, highway program, the purchase of mortgages, corps of engineers, public works, HEW projects, agriculture projects, highways, housing credits, reasons for cutbacks, the tax increase, proposals to Chairman Mills, centers for heart, cancer, and strokes, Federal Reserve action, the Ways and Means Committee, and the Defense Department budget.
- January 18 – In a letter, President Johnson accepts the resignation of John T. Connor as United States Secretary of Commerce.
- January 19 – President Johnson presents the Medal of Honor to Air Force officer Bernard F. Fisher in the East Room.
- January 19 – In a message to Congress, President Johnson transmits the second annual report on the operation of the International Coffee Agreement. Johnson speaks on the accomplishments of the program and warns that "countries heavily dependent on earnings from their production of coffee will face a continuing threat of instability" in the event that demand and production are not balanced.
- January 24 – At noon, President Johnson submits a 21.9 billion bill to Congress that brings the cost of the war to 46.2 billion.
- January 30 – President Johnson signs Proclamation 3765, designating "March 1967 as Red Cross Month" and urging "all Americans to give this voluntary organization their full support for the benefit of all our citizens."
- January 30 – President Johnson signs Executive Order 11325, imposing regulations on the Selective Service that will constitute "Part 1643 of Chapter XVI of Title 32 of the Code of Federal Regulations".
- January 31 – President Johnson delivers remarks on the accepting of a portrait of late U.S. President Franklin D. Roosevelt in an East Room ceremony attended by members of the Roosevelt family.
- January 31 – In a letter to Chairman of the Cleaning House Association Robert C. Baker, President Johnson reiterates his message to Congress from January 25 and expresses how the budget he wishes implemented will benefit the District of Columbia.
- January 31 – In a message to Congress, President Johnson reflects on past legislative action toward service members and proposes the Vietnam Conflict Servicemen and Veterans Act of 1967 "to remove the inequities in the treatment of veterans of the present conflict in Vietnam", "enlarge the opportunities for educationally disadvantaged veterans", "expand educational allowances under the G.I. Bill", "increase the amount of Servicemen's Group Life Insurance", "increase the pensions now received by 1.4 million disabled veterans, widows and dependents", and "to make certain that no veteran's pension will be reduced as a result of increases in Federal retirement benefits, such as social security."
- January 31 – In a statement, President Johnson announces that he has submitted six proposals to Congress to meet the needs of American service members and veterans and outlines them while stating that the proposals will show the resolve of the United States to help its service members past and present in their hour of need.
- January 31 – President Johnson transmits the annual report on United States aeronautics, and space activities to Congress in a message. President Johnson touts the space record of the US and writes that no achievements would have been possible without American involvement.
- January 31 – President Johnson delivers remarks to members of the United States Jaycees Governmental Affairs Seminar in the Cabinet Room.

== February ==
- February 1 – In a letter to United States Secretary of Commerce John T. Connor, President Johnson confirms he has read Connor's report "on the fine progress that has been made in implementing Reorganization Plan No. 2 of 1965" and commending him along with "ESSA management, and all ESSA employees for the efficiency and sensitivity which have contributed to carrying out this reorganization."
- February 1 – President Johnson attends a ceremony commemorating the effective date of minimum wage increases in the Cabinet Room.
- February 1 – In a letter to Senate President Humphrey and House Speaker McCormick, President Johnson advocates for including the proposed San Rafael Wilderness in the Wilderness System and transmits "a letter and report from Secretary of Agriculture Orville L. Freeman recommending the establishment of this Wilderness area."
- February 2 – President Johnson holds his ninety-fifth news conference in the East Room. President Johnson beings the conference with an address on consular convention with the Soviet Union and answers questions from reporters on Vietnam, his relationship with the press, the new session of Congress, American relations with Eastern Europe, communism since World War II, and the Democratic Party.
- February 2 – President Johnson reports on progress "in organizing the war against hunger" and lists several steps to address the issue of hunger.
- February 2 – President Johnson attends the Presidential Prayer Breakfast at the Shoreham Hotel in Washington.
- February 6 – President Johnson presents the National Medal of Science Awards for 1966 in the East Room.
- February 6 – In a statement, President Johnson says the Safe Streets and Crime Control Act of 1967 "calls for the most comprehensive attack on crime ever undertaken" and asserts the federal government can assist with training better police departments as well as provide better equipment in order to prevent "the rising tide of organized crime, to stop the illegal flow of narcotics, to keep lethal weapons out of the wrong hands, guarantee the right of privacy of every American citizen."
- February 6 – President Johnson sends a special message to Congress on crime in the United States and speaks on his receiving the report of the National Crime Commission before offering proposals to better "the caliber and training of enforcement, judicial and officials", better "the capability of police detect crimes and apprehend commit them", an expansion of "the range and quality of treatment services", fully using "advanced scientific methods in the courtroom, to reduce frustrating and unfair delays and to make available to the sentencing judge all necessary information about the defendant", "provide better counsel for juveniles and for adults who cannot afford to provide their own", and better "communication and understanding between law enforcement authorities and the urban poor."
- February 6 – President Johnson meets with RFK and Walt Rostow in the Oval Office.
- February 7 – President Johnson transmits the first Treaty on Outer Space to the Senate in a message. President Johnson recommends "that the Senate act promptly in giving consent to the ratification of this Treaty."
- February 8 – In a reply to Pope Paul VI, President Johnson says the governments of the United States and the Republic of Vietnam are working to end the Vietnam War and preparations by both parties to discuss a diplomatic solution to the war.
- February 8 – President Johnson addresses Boy Scouts following their presentation of "Report to the Nation" in the Cabinet Room.
- February 8 – In a statement, President Johnson says he has asked Congress "to enact a new charter for the young people of America" that would include strengthening Head Start, "a lunch program for undernourished preschool children", improving "health services for children and for expectant mothers", tackling juvenile delinquency, and providing summer recreation of a healthy variety.
- February 8 – In a special message to Congress, President Johnson transmits "a 12-point program for the children and youth of America" and equates preparation of American youth with good economics, reciting a quote by Franklin D. Roosevelt in which Roosevelt stated that "the destiny of American youth is the destiny of America."
- February 9 – President Johnson and King Hassan II of Morocco deliver toasts at a dinner in the State Dining Room.
- February 9 – In a statement, President Johnson says he has "asked the Congress to help chart a new course for American foreign aid. We know that aid is indispensable to our quest for world order" and that the United States needs to adopt an objective of helping regions that want to help themselves.
- February 9 – In a special message to Congress, President Johnson proposes the Foreign Assistance Act of 1967 and says the legislation "will contain a clear statement of the philosophy which underlies our programs and the criteria to be used in this Administration."
- February 9 – President Johnson delivers remarks at the welcoming ceremony of King Hassan II of Morocco in the East Room on how both the United States and Morocco "are dedicated to the ideals of freedom – freedom for ourselves and freedom for all others" and "are devoted to orderly progress and to equal justice for all people."
- February 23 – President Johnson attends a ceremony marking the ratifying of the Twenty-fifth Amendment to the United States Constitution in the East Room.
- February 24 – President Johnson issues a statement on the death of Roy Roberts.
- February 27 – President Johnson transmits the Reorganization Plan No. 1 of 1967 to Congress in a message, saying the plan would transfer "authority to approve the surrender of certain ship documents" from the Commerce Secretary to the Transportation Secretary.
- February 27 – President Johnson attends a briefing by David Lilienthal and Robert Komer after they returned from Vietnam in Johnson's White House office.
- February 27 – In a letter to Senate President Humphrey and House Speaker McCormick, President Johnson attaches a copy of Executive Order 11322 and says the order "implements the action of the United Nations Security Council reflected in its Resolution No. 232, adopted on December 16, 1966, on which the Representative of the United States voted affirmatively."
- February 27 – President Johnson sends a special message to Congress on the United States Capitol.
- February 27 – President Johnson holds his ninety-sixth news conference in his White House office. President Johnson answers questions from reporters on Vietnam, the Attorney General appointment, the inter-American meeting in Buenos Aires, intent to visit other Latin America countries, the economy, views of Secretaries Rusk and McNamara, prospects for peace, Vietnam tactics, and political criticisms.
- February 28 – President Johnson announces his selection of Ramsey Clark to serve as the next United States Attorney General to the press and notes the nomination is a problem for Clark's father Associate Justice Tom C. Clark when asked by a reporter in his White House office.
- February 28 – In a statement, President Johnson says "Congress has received my fourth message on education and health" and that the goal of America "is the healthiest and the best educated society the world has ever known."
- February 28 – President Johnson sends a special message to Congress on the subject of health and education in America and advocates for Americans to "encourage states and localities to plan more effectively and comprehensively for their growing needs and to measure their progress towards meeting those needs."
- February 28 – President Johnson issues a statement on the death of Henry Luce, calling him "a pioneer of American journalism" and crediting him with having "a sense of history in the making, and so helped millions of men and women in this country and abroad to understand the forces that shape the society in which they live."
- February 28 – In a statement, President Johnson says he has sent Congress "a 1968 budget amendment totaling $149.8 million for three significant scientific project" and that he is "recommending appropriations of $91 million in the coming fiscal year for nuclear rocket development."

== March ==
- March 1 – President Johnson issues a memorandum to department and agency leadership on his "directing the relevant agencies in the Executive Branch to begin at once a major and coordinated effort to review our readiness to make the economic adjustments which a termination of hostilities in Vietnam might require."
- March 2 – President Johnson delivers remarks on the centennial of the United States Office of Education reflecting on its establishment by President Andrew Johnson in 1867 and its rise in concerns over the decades in the Office of Education Plaza.
- March 2 – In a letter to Senator Henry M. Jackson, President Johnson relates the continued bombing of North Vietnam by the United States was caused by North Vietnam's violation of two international agreements and says this policy will persist "until those who launched this aggression are prepared to move seriously to reinstall the agreements whose violations has brought the scourge of war to Southeast Asia."
- March 2 – In a statement, President Johnson notes the fiftieth anniversary of the granting of United States citizenship to Puerto Rico and says "the people of the United States and the people of Puerto Rico share an equal dedication" in the cause of justice and human dignity.
- March 2 – President Johnson attends a ceremony marking the centennial of Howard University in the physical education building at Howard.
- March 2 – President Johnson holds his ninety-seventh news conference in the Fish Room. President Johnson begins the conference with a remark on the Soviet Union reply confirming "the willingness of the Soviet Government to discuss means of limiting the arms race in offensive and defensive nuclear missiles" and answers questions from reporters on House action toward Clayton Powell, Vietnam, Soviet Union discussions, and the New Orleans challenge on the Warren Commission.
- March 2 – President Johnson signs Executive Order 11329, establishing a "Board of Inquiry, consisting of Mr. J. Keith Mann, Chairman, Mr. George E. Reedy and Mr. Paul D. Hanlon, whom I appoint to inquire into the issues involved in this dispute" that will "have powers and duties as set forth in Title II of such Act."
- March 3 – In a statement, President Johnson announces that he is appointing "a commission of 15 distinguished American citizens to make a thorough study of the Federal budget and the manner in which it is presented to the Congress and the public" and says he is asking "the commission to prepare its recommendations by September."
- March 4 – In a statement, President Johnson announces "a series of actions to reinforce the welcome recovery of housing construction that is already underway" that "are aimed to encourage the construction of housing for families of low and moderate incomes."
- March 4 – In a statement, President Johnson says the National Advisory Council's appointment "is further proof of our determination that the war on poverty will be a citizen's war" and that the council "will recommend to the Director of the Office of Economic Opportunity changes and improvements which should be made in our antipoverty programs, and report to me and to the Congress concerning its findings and recommendations."
- March 4 – In a statement, President Johnson announces "the appointment of Miss Betty Furness as Special Assistant for Consumer Affairs" who "will also serve as Chairman of the Committee on Consumer Interests and as Executive Secretary of the Consumer Advisory Council."
- March 4 – President Johnson signs Proclamation 3769, proclaiming "the week beginning March 5, 1967, as Save Your Vision Week" and inviting "the Governors of the States, the Commonwealth of Puerto Rico, and officials of other areas subject to the jurisdiction of the United States to issue similar proclamations."
- March 5 – President Johnson signs Executive Order 11330, establishing the membership of the President's Council on Youth Opportunity, its functions such as seeking the aid of department heads whenever a matter resonating with a particular agency surfaces and they do not have that topic as one of their areas of concern, and both establishing the Citizens Advisory Board on Youth Opportunity in addition to its membership.
- March 6 – In a message to Congress, President Johnson transmits the fifth annual report of the Peace Corps. He states the intent of the Peace Corps during the upcoming year of 1968 and his confidence in the report being a "gratifying reading to all who are interested in this pioneering and humane endeavor."
- March 6 – In a message to Congress, President Johnson transmits a report "on the Community Work and Training Program authorized by the Public Welfare Amendments of 1962" and urging the states "to study the lessons we have learned and to avail themselves fully of the promise which these programs hold."
- March 6 – In a message to Congress, President Johnson discusses the Selective Service, relating the new legislation enacted by Congress on the Selective Service following the conclusion of World War II and its qualifications.
- March 6 – President Johnson signs Executive Order 11331, establishing the creation of the Pacific Northwest River Basins Commission under the request of governors from multiple states.
- March 7 – President Johnson attends the Seventh Annual Federal Woman's Award Ceremony in the Cabinet Room.
- March 7 – President Johnson signs Executive Order 11333, suspending "until June 29, 1968, the provisions of section 6374 of title 10 of the United States Code, but only with respect to a brigadier general on the active list of the Marine Corps whose second failure of selection for promotion to the grade of major general occurred during the same fiscal year as his first failure of selection for such promotion."
- March 7 – President Johnson signs Executive Order 11334, designating the Asian Development Bank "as a public international organization entitled to enjoy the privileges, exemptions, and immunities conferred by the International Organizations Immunities Act" and amending Executive Order 11269 by adding terms that the Council and Treasury Secretary shall abide by.
- March 7 – President Johnson signs Executive Order 11332, ordering "that any income, excess profits, estate, or gift tax return for the years 1947 to 1968, inclusive, shall, during the Ninetieth Congress, be open to inspection by the Committee on Government Operations, House of Representatives, or any duly authorized subcommittee thereof, in connection with its studies of the operation of Government activities at all levels with a view to determining the economy and efficiency of the Government."
- March 8 – President Johnson transmits the Single Convention on Narcotic Drugs, 1961 to the Senate for its advice and consent.
- March 8 – In a letter to Chairman of Federal Woman's Award Study Group Penelope H. Thunberg, President Johnson confirms he "considered the initial report of the Federal Woman's Award Study Group and have approved the recommendations you have made" and that he has asked "Secretary Wirtz to have the Interdepartmental Committee on the Status of Women give early consideration to the form of issuance of the proposed Executive Order" and "Chairman Macy to initiate immediate action on the other recommendations of the Study Group and to report to me by the first of July the progress made."
- March 8 – President Johnson transmits the third annual report on the status of the National Wilderness Preservation System to Congress. President Johnson notes his past submission of "legislation to authorize the first addition to the Wilderness System since its establishment – the San Rafael Wilderness, Los Padres National Forest, California" and states his intent to continue making recommendations later in the year.
- March 8 – James J. Reynolds is sworn in as Under Secretary and Thomas R. Donahue as Assistant Secretary of Labor in the East Room.
- March 9 – In a statement, President Johnson says he has transmitted to Congress "a fiscal year 1968 budget amendment involving a decrease in the amount of $14.9 million for the Atomic Energy Commission" and that the Atomic Energy Commission "will terminate the current development work on the heavy-water-moderated, organic-cooled reactor (HWOCR) concept for civilian power but will continue a research and development program on heavy water reactor technology."
- March 9 – President Johnson transmits the Reorganization Plan No. 2 of 1967 to Congress in a message. President Johnson endorses the plan as "a step toward fulfilling my pledge to the American people that Government must be reshaped to meet the tasks of today. It underscores my conviction that progress can be achieved by building upon what is strong and enduring, but that we shall never hesitate to discard what is inefficient or outmoded."
- March 9 – President Johnson holds his ninety eighth news conference in the East Room. President Johnson begins the conference with an address on his sending a message to Congress "asking it to act speedily to restore the investment credit and the use of accelerated depreciation for buildings" and answers questions from reporters on differing beliefs on the Vietnam War, income tax increase, Vietnam, meeting with General Westmoreland and Ambassador Lodge, CIA activities, the Russian view of Vietnam, the Federal Reserve Board, Vietnam settlement conditions, relations with the Soviet Union, procedure for the Selective Service, the upcoming presidential election, another war in Vietnam about establishing a constitutional democracy, the West Coast shipyard strike, the effect of the Apollo tragedy on the space program, and the sales of rifles to Singapore.
- March 9 – President Johnson awards the Medal of Honor to Specialist 6 Lawrence Joel on the South Lawn.
- March 9 – President Johnson transmits the twentieth annual report on United States participation in the United Nations in a message to Congress. The report covers 1965 and President Johnson writes that the year "gave new evidence of our country's vigorous commitment to the world organization, and to the cause of peace which it serves. All of the American efforts recorded here – whether political, economic, social, legal or administrative – were designed solely to further that commitment."
- March 9 – President Johnson transmits a report "on the marine science activities of the Federal Government" in a message to Congress.
- March 9 – President Johnson issues Executive Order 11335, amending Executive Order 11248 to include "(12) Commissioner, Property Management and Disposal Service, General Services Administration."
- March 10 – Ramsey Clark is sworn in as the 66th United States Attorney General in the Great Hall at the Department of Justice.
- March 10 – President Johnson awards the Presidential Unit Citation to the 3d Aerospace Rescue and Recovery Group of the United States Military Airlift Command in the Cabinet Room.
- March 10 – President Johnson signs Proclamation 3770, requesting the observance of "Monday, May 1, 1967, as Law Day in the United States of America" and urging "the people of the United States to observe Law Day with appropriate ceremonies and by reaffirming their commitment to freedom and the supremacy of law in our lives."
- March 11 – In a message to Constantine II of Greece, President Johnson reflects on the Truman Doctrine's call for preservation of freedom for the Greek people and says he is "proud of the fact that throughout that period, the United States and Greece have worked together in close partnership toward common goals."
- March 11 – In a message to President of Turkey Cevdet Sunay, President Johnson extends best wishes to the president and the Turkish people on the twentieth anniversary of the Truman Doctrine.
- March 11 – In a letter to former President Truman, President Johnson reflects on Truman pitching the Truman Doctrine to Congress and credits Truman with helping to the teach the lessons of freedom not being divisible, world order is vital to national interest, and high costs are paid by those who ignore their responsibilities.
- March 13 – President Johnson transmits a message on the upcoming meeting of American leaders in Punta del Este in Uruguay to Congress. He says the meeting "represents another link in the bond of partnership which joins us with more than 230 million neighbors to the south" and "a review of the progress we have made together in a great adventure which unites the destinies of all of us."
- March 14 – President Johnson transmits a message to Congress on urban and rural poverty in the United States.
- March 14 – President Johnson and Prime Minister of South Korea Chung Il-kwon deliver toasts at a luncheon in the State Dining Room at the White House.
- March 14 – President Johnson meets with South Korea Prime Minister Chung II-kwon in which President Johnson expressed "the continuing admiration of the American people for the courage and prowess of the Korean forces on the field of battle in Vietnam and for their effective endeavors to promote the welfare of the Vietnamese populace."
- March 14 – President Johnson delivers remarks to Korean Prime Minister Chung during the welcoming ceremony on the South Lawn.
- March 15 – President Johnson attend the dedication of Columbia State Community College in Columbia, Tennessee.
- March 15 – President Johnson delivers on American policy in Vietnam in the House Chamber of the Tennessee State Capitol at Nashville, Tennessee.
- March 15 – President Johnson delivers remarks at Hermitage ceremonies on the two hundredth anniversary of the birth of Andrew Jackson.
- March 16 – President Johnson signs S. 665 into law. President Johnson says the legislation authorizes funds "necessary for the procurement of missiles, aircraft, and tracked combat vehicles, for research, development and evaluation, and for military construction."
- March 16 – In a statement, President Johnson says the Senate agreeing to the ratification of the Consular Convention was an event in which the chamber "acted in the best tradition of American government" and that the convention "will provide important measures to protect Americans traveling in the Soviet Union. Last year more than 18,000 of our citizens visited the U.S.S.R."
- March 17 – President Johnson transmits a report on the Communications Satellite Act of 1962 to Congress in a message. President Johnson says American space technology is assisting in the creation of world peace and that the people of the world understand "the potential for completely new, heretofore unimagined ways of peaceful cooperation for expanding world trade, for enhancing educational opportunities, for uplifting the spirit and enriching the lives of people everywhere."
- March 17 – President Johnson sends a message to Congress on the topic of the federal government's quality. He reflects on Franklin D. Roosevelt and the 75th United States Congress "still harnessing the resources of government to continue the rout of the great depression which had threatened to overwhelm the country" and efforts made by the Hoover Commission to reorganize the government during the administration of Harry S. Truman.
- March 17 – In a statement, President Johnson announces that he is "instructing Federal agencies to release $791 million of those deferred funds."
- March 18 – President Johnson delivers a toast at a dinner for governors reflecting on the tradition of the Governors' conference beginning in 1908 when Theodore Roosevelt requested American governors to meet with him in Washington.
- March 18 – President Johnson attends the Governors' Luncheon in the State Dining Room.
- March 18 – President Johnson attends a White House Conference With the Governors in the Fish Room.
- March 20 – President Johnson and Chairman Thieu deliver toasts at a dinner at President Johnson's Guam home of Nimitz House.
- March 20 – President Johnson delivers remarks at the opening session of the Guam Conference at Nimitz Hill, Guam headquarters of U.S. Naval Forces Marianas.
- March 20 – In a statement, President Johnson says he is "deeply pleased to hear from Prime Minister Ky that the Directorate has agreed to the new Constitution just adopted by the Constituent Assembly of the Republic of Vietnam", adding that the Constitution "marks the most important step in Vietnam's progress toward representative government" and "establishes an executive branch and endows it with wide powers, but subjects it, at the same time, to strong measures of control by the legislature."
- March 20 – President Johnson delivers remarks upon his arrival at Guam International Airport confirming that Guam was selected "for its convenience to those who are conducting the military and peaceful development campaign in Vietnam."
- March 20 – President Johnson delivers welcoming remarks to Chairman Thieu and Prime Minister Ky at Guam International Airport stating his "hope that this conference will be of value to both of us in charting the course for the future of the struggle for freedom in Vietnam."
- March 21 – President Johnson delivers remarks at Andrews Air Force Base over the seven areas of major American concern that were discussed in Guam and says the nature of the war "requires courage, perseverance, and dedication" while confirming that there was no new policy achieved during the meeting.
- March 21 – In a letter to President of the Democratic Republic of Vietnam Ho Chi Minh, President Johnson writes of his hope that the Vietnam War can come to an end and states that he is "prepared to order a cessation of bombing against your country and the stopping of further augmentation of U.S. forces in South Viet-Nam as soon as I am assured that infiltration into South Viet-Nam by land and by sea has stopped. These acts of restraint on both sides would, I believe, make it possible for us to conduct serious and private discussions leading toward an early peace."
- March 21 – In a statement, President Johnson expresses regret in not being able to personally visit the Pacific Islands due to time constraints but "that Commissioner Norwood's impressive analysis has given me a vivid sense of the progressive spirit now at work in Micronesia."
- March 21 – President Johnson delivers remarks at Andersen Air Force Base on the aims of the administration in Vietnam and outlines the seven major concerns the United States has toward Vietnam.
- March 21 – President Johnson holds his ninety-ninth news conference in Top O' The Mar. President Johnson begins the conference with a report on the Vietnam discussions and answers questions from reporters on Vietnam's prognosis, enemy sanctuaries in Cambodia and Laos, military decisions at the conference, Komer's performance in Vietnam, the pace of pacification, obstacles to peace discussions, American troops in relation to the pacification program, U.N. diplomatic activities, Hanoi's assessment of American public opinion, and plans and remarks by Ambassador Lodge.
- March 21 – The United States and Vietnam release a joint statement on Guam detailing that the completed meeting between President Johnson, Chairman Thiệu, Prime Minister Ky, and party leadership of the American mission in Saigon on "their joint determination with their allies, to defend freedom in South Vietnam and at the same time to continue the earnest search for an honorable peace" as well as talks regarding "the military front, where the initiative lies increasingly with the allied forces and where the leaders of North Vietnam must recognize the futility of their effort to seize control of South Vietnam by force."
- March 22 – President Johnson issues a memorandum to department and agency leadership on air traffic in the vicinity of airports before directing them "to take into explicit and due account aircraft noise whenever it is relevant to any of their programs or to action in which they may 'participate, and to cooperate with the Secretaries of the Department of Transportation and the Department of Housing and Urban Development in efforts to control and reduce the problems of aircraft noise."
- March 22 – President Johnson transmits the first annual report on the operation of the Automotive Products Trade Act of 1965 to Congress in a message. President Johnson says the agreement is a "joint undertaking by the United States and Canada to create a broader market for automotive products, to liberalize automotive trade between the two countries, and to establish conditions conducive to the most efficient patterns of investment, production and trade in this critical industry."
- March 22 – In a statement, President Johnson reflects on his last State of Union Address calling for concern for American Indians and states that he is pleased to "provide the means for rapid assistance to those needy Indians whose plight is compounded by acts of nature beyond their control."
- March 22 – President Johnson signs Executive Order 11336, designating power to the United States Secretary of Agriculture "to exercise, without the approval, ratification, or other action of the President, the authority vested in the President by clause (1) of the fifth sentence of section 407 of the Agricultural Act of 1949, as amended (7 U.S.C. 1427), to the extent prescribed in subsection (b) of this section."
- March 23 – In a statement, President Johnson says he is sending Congress "a supplemental request for $479 million to cover the additional cost of the fiscal 1967 pay increase authorized last year for some Federal employees and military personnel" and that the appropriations "together with the $339 million supplemental appropriation requested last week, amounts to $818 million – $262 million less than the full cost of the increases."
- March 23 – President Johnson sends a birthday message to General William Westmoreland.
- March 24 – William M. Roth is sworn in as Special Representative for Trade Negotiations.
- March 24 – President Johnson signs Proclamation 3771, proclaiming "the week beginning May 21, 1967, as World Trade Week" and requesting "the appropriate Federal, State, and local officials to cooperate in the observance of that week."
- March 24 – President Johnson signs Proclamation 3772, proclaiming "the week beginning April 23, 1967 as Youth Temperance Education Week" and inviting "the Governors of the States, the Commonwealth of Puerto Rico, and officials of other areas subject to the jurisdiction of the United States to issue similar proclamations."
- March 25 – President Johnson signs Executive Order 11337, ordering "that any income, excess-profits, estate, or gift tax return for the years 1948 to 1966, inclusive, shall, during the Ninetieth Congress, be open to inspection by the Senate Committee on Government Operations or any duly authorized subcommittee thereof, in connection with its studies of the operation of Government activities at all levels with a view to determining the economy and efficiency of the Government."
- March 27 – President Johnson signs Executive Order 11338, adding "(13) Deputy Under Secretary, Department of Transportation" to section 2 of Executive Order 11248.
- March 28–30 – President Johnson meets with Prime Minister of Afghanistan Mohammad Hashim Maiwandwal in which the Afghanistan leader discusses his efforts "to build and strengthen democratic institutions and to press economic and social progress."
- March 28 – President Johnson delivers remarks to delegates of the National Conference on Crime Control at a dinner at the Willard Hotel in Washington.
- March 29 – President Johnson delivers remarks to Directors of the State Departments of Commerce regarding the benefits of enacting the proposed Intergovernmental Manpower Act in the Cabinet Room.
- March 30 – President Johnson attends a dinner for Democratic State Chairmen at the Washington Hilton Hotel.
- March 30 – In a statement, President Johnson says Executive Order 11340 will start the Department of Transportation on April 1 and "consolidate 35 programs previously dispersed through 7 departments and independent agencies" in addition to uniting close to "100,000 employees, and annual expenditures of more than $6 billion."
- March 30 – President Johnson signs Proclamation 3773, designating May 1967 as "Senior Citizens Month" and calling for government and private and voluntary organizations to comply with the observance.
- March 31 – President Johnson arrives at Randolph Air Force Base in Texas and delivers remarks on his intent there with Latin American ambassadors.

== April ==
- April 1 – In a statement, President Johnson says Congressional approval of H.J. Res. 267 has shown the willingness of Congress to address critical food needs in India and that the United States is partnering with other countries to support ending the food plight in India.
- April 3 – President Johnson and President of Turkey Cevdet Sunay deliver toasts at a dinner in the State Dining Room.
- April 3 – In a statement, President Johnson reports "that action has been taken or is now in progress in fields covered by about three-fourths of the more than 400 recommendations" with regards to the White House Conference on International Cooperation.
- April 3 – President Johnson transmits the second annual report of the National Capital Transportation Agency for calendar year 1966 to Congress in a message.
- April 3 – President Johnson delivers remarks at the welcoming ceremony at Turkey President Sunay on the South Lawn.
- April 3 – President Johnson attends a ceremony marking the fiftieth anniversary of the Federal Land Banks in the Rose Garden.
- April 4 – President Johnson delivers remarks to Directors and Managers of the Veterans Administration in the Rose Garden.
- April 4 – President Johnson attends a ceremony commemorating the winners of the Fourth: Annual Physical Fitness Leadership Awards in the Cabinet Room.
- April 4 – In a statement, President Johnson says H.R. 7123 is an appropriation of "12,196,520,000 for the support of operations in Southeast Asia" while implementing mandatory restrictions on the deactivation of certain airlift and troop carrier units in both the Air Force Reserve and Air National Guard.
- April 5 – In a statement, President Johnson announces funds being allocated to college students for education opportunities and says the investment "will be returned many times over when they take their places as highly trained and contributing members of our society."
- April 5 – President Johnson sends a special message to Congress on the topics of federal pay and postal rates, arguing in favor of government employees having pay increases in addition to an increase in postal rates and improving postal services.
- April 6 – President Johnson posthumously rewards the Medal of Honor to Specialist 4 Daniel Fernandez in the Rose Garden.
- April 6 – President Johnson transmits the 16th Annual Report of the National Science Foundation to Congress in a message. President Johnson says the report "tells a proud story of continuing progress on many scientific frontiers – of bold and creative men and women pitting their skill and imagination against the challenges and opportunities posed by Nature" and lays out steps for maintaining the promise of the report.
- April 6 – President Johnson signs Proclamation 3775, calling "upon the people of the United States, and upon all patriotic, civic, and educational organizations, to observe Monday, May 1, 1967, as Loyalty Day, with appropriate ceremonies in which all of us may join in a reaffirmation of our loyalty to the United States of America."
- April 7 – President Johnson delivers remarks on the meeting with NATO Nuclear Planting Group and answers questions from reporters on whether troop reduction was discussed during the meeting and nuclear land mines mentioned by Turkey in his White House office.
- April 7 – President Johnson signs Proclamation 3776, proclaiming "the month of April 1967 as Cancer Control Month" and inviting "the Governors of the States, the Commonwealth of Puerto Rico, and other areas subject to the jurisdiction of the United States to issue similar proclamations."
- April 7 – President Johnson signs Proclamation 3777, proclaiming "the week beginning May 1, 1967, as National CARIH Asthma Week" and inviting "the Governors of the States, the Commonwealth of Puerto Rico, and officials of other areas subject to the jurisdiction of the United States to issue similar proclamations."
- April 8 – In a statement, President Johnson announces that he has "called upon 10 distinguished Americans to conduct the most searching and exhaustive review ever undertaken of the structure and organization of the Post Office Department" and "asked the Commission to determine whether the high quality postal service which Americans have come to expect can better be performed by a Cabinet department, a Government corporation, or some other form of organization."
- April 8 – President Johnson signs Executive Order 11341, establishing the President's Commission on Postal Organization in addition to its functions, the cooperation of executive departments and agencies, commpensatio0n and personnel, and its Executive Director "who shall be designated by the President and shall receive such compensation as may hereafter be specified".
- April 8 – President Johnson signs Proclamation 3778, calling "upon all the people of the United States to observe the month of May in this and each succeeding year as Steelmark Month with appropriate proceedings and ceremonies."
- April 10 – President Johnson sends a special message to Congress on the impending nationwide railroad strike and recommending "that Congress approve a joint resolution to extend the 60-day "no strike" period in this case/or an additional 20 days."
- April 10 – President Johnson delivers remarks to Vice President Humphrey following his return from Europe on the South Lawn.
- April 10 – President Johnson signs Proclamation 3779, modifying Proclamation 3279 to include, "The Secretary of the Interior shall keep under review the supply-demand situation with respect to asphalt in District I, Districts II–IV, District V, and Puerto Rico, and, as he determines to be consonant with the objectives of this proclamation, he may in his discretion (1) establish, without respect to the levels of imports prescribed in section 2, a maximum level of imports of asphalt for District I, or Districts II–IV, or District V, or Puerto Rico and, notwithstanding the provisions of subparagraph (4) of paragraph (b) of this section 3, establish a special system of allocation of such imports, or (2) permit the entry for consumption or the withdrawal from warehouse for consumption of asphalt in District I, or Districts II–IV, or District V, or Puerto Rico, without allocations or licenses, notwithstanding the provisions of section 1."
- April 10 – President Johnson signs Executive Order 11342, establishing the Quetico–Superior Committee including its composition and its function to "advise and consult with the appropriate executive departments and agencies of the Government of the United States and of the State of Minnesota, and shall from time to time make such recommendations as it deems proper."
- April 11 – In a statement, President Johnson expresses approval for the Congress decision to extend the no strike period in the railroad dispute and urges "both the carriers and the workers to use every hour of these 20 days to negotiate in earnest in an attempt to reach an equitable decision in the American way of true collective bargaining.
- April 11 – President Johnson delivers a toast at a dinner in Punta del Este, Uruguay attended by Central American Presidents in the Hall of the Americas at the San Rafael Hotel.
- April 11 – President Johnson delivers remarks at Carrasco Airport on the progress of the alliance between American heads of state as well as the purpose of their meeting in Punta del Este.
- April 12 – In a statement, President Johnson recalls the program increasing financial assistance to Central American countries in the areas of "economic integration, multinational projects, agriculture, education, and health" that he proposed to Congress the previous month and reports on progress made since then.
- April 12 – President Johnson signs S.J. Res. 65 into law, extending the no strike period of the railroad dispute and announces he is "appointing a special panel of three judicious Americans: Judge Charles Fahy, recently retired Judge of the U.S. Court of Appeals for the District of Columbia, George Taylor, professor of industry, University of Pennsylvania, and John Dunlop, professor of economics, Harvard University" that he is requesting "to help the parties mediate their differences, and if the parties should fail to reach agreement, to recommend whatever additional action may be necessary."
- April 12 – President Johnson signs Executive Order 11343, creating "a board of three members" to investigate the dispute between the Long Island rail road and its employees.
- April 13 – President Johnson delivers remarks at the public session of the meeting of American heads of state in the Hall of the Americas at the San Rafael Hotel.
- April 14 – In a statement, President Johnson reflects on the American heads of state meeting as having a goal "to demonstrate that freedom and economic development are not enemies – that massive social and political transformations can be accomplished without the lash of dictatorship, or the spur of terror."
- April 14 – President Johnson delivers remarks at an airport in Paramaribo, Suriname after returning from the American heads of state meeting.
- April 15 – President Johnson signs Proclamation 3780, proclaiming "the period of April 16–22, 1967, to be DISCOVER AMERICA PLANNING WEEK" and urging "all individuals, businesses, industries, and civic and other organizations to give the observance their fullest cooperation and support."
- April 15 – President Johnson signs Executive Order 11344, creating "a board of inquiry, consisting of Mr. Leo C. Brown, Chairman, Mr. James C. Hill and Mr. Clyde W. Summers, whom I appoint to inquire into the issues involved in" the dispute between Avco Corporation and employees at the Lycoming Division Plant.
- April 17 – President Johnson transmits the 1966 Annual Report of the National Capital Housing Authority to Congress in a message.
- April 17 – President Johnson transmits the 1965 Annual Report of the Department of Housing and Urban Development to Congress in a message.
- April 19 – President Johnson issues a statement on the death of Konrad Adenauer, who Johnson asserts "will always be a symbol of the vitality and courage of the German people."
- April 19 – President Johnson presents the National Teacher of the Year Award in the Rose Garden.
- April 20 – In a statement, President Johnson says the Teacher Corps "has made a strong beginning" and "offers bright promise for substantial improvement in the education of disadvantaged children, and it should be continued."
- April 20 – In a statement, President Johnson reflects on his asking Congress "to increase the salaries of Government employee" and "to increase postal rates and improve postal services" before mentioning the benefits of the executive order he is signing later that day.
- April 20 – President Johnson signs Executive Order 11348, a five-part addition to the training of government employees.
- April 20 – President Johnson signs Executive Order 11345, establishing the Great Lakes Basin Commission and granting the commission jurisdiction over "the Great Lakes Basin Commission referred to in section 1 of this order (hereinafter referred to as the Commission) shall extend to those portions of the eight Great Lakes States of Illinois, Indiana, Michigan, Minnesota, New York, Ohio, Pennsylvania, and Wisconsin that are drained by the St. Lawrence River system".
- April 20 – President Johnson signs Executive Order 11346, adding "(14) Deputy Assistant Secretary for Mortgage Credit, Department of Housing and Urban Development" to section 2 of Executive Order 11248.
- April 20 – President Johnson signs Executive Order 11347, amending Executive Order 11210 to establish a temporary commission "composed of the Attorney General, the Postmaster General, the Secretary of Commerce, the Secretary of Health, Education, and Welfare, the Secretary of Housing and Urban Development, the Secretary of the Interior, the Secretary of Labor, the Secretary of Transportation, the Secretary of the Treasury, the Administrator of General Services, the Chairman of the Commission of Fine Arts, the Chairman of the National Capital Planning Commission, the Director of the National Gallery of Art, the President of the Board of Commissioners of the District of Columbia, the Secretary of the Smithsonian Institution, and such other members as may be appointed by the President."
- April 21 – President Johnson transmits the first annual report of the National Advisory Council on Extension and Continuing Education in a message to Congress.
- April 21 – In a memorandum to department and agency heads, President Johnson discusses air pollution and writes that he is "directing Secretary Gardner to inform the Congress that an additional $2.7 million in the 1967 supplemental request will be devoted to research on controlling pollution from sulfur oxides."
- April 22 – In a statement, President Johnson reflects on his appointing "an emergency board under the Railway Labor Act to investigate the dispute between virtually all of the Nation's railroad carriers and six shopcraft unions representing 137,000 employees" and that the panel has reported to him that an agreement has still not been reached. President Johnson says his decision to make the panel's report public is "because it is important that the American people and the parties weigh the impact of a rail strike against the narrow issues that separate the parties. I have also directed the special panel to continue to use every minute of every hour to get the parties to achieve a voluntary settlement through collective bargaining."
- April 22 – In a statement, President Johnson notes the damage caused by the Midwest tornadoes and says he has "asked Farris Bryant, the Director of the Office of Emergency Planning, and other agencies of the Federal Government to render all possible assistance to Governor Kerner and the local authorities so that the resources of the Federal Government can quickly respond to the needs of the people in their time of crisis" and "directed Governor Bryant to dispatch immediately emergency teams to the areas hardest hit to provide on-the-scene assistance."
- April 24 – President Johnson sends a telegram to governors inviting them to the luncheon honoring General Westmoreland while admitting that he is aware they were in Washington a short time ago and saying that the meeting will see an exchange of views from those present.
- April 24 – In a message to Presidium of the Supreme Soviet Nikolai Podgorny, President Johnson says the death of Vladimir Komarov is an international tragedy and extending the condolences of the American people to the Soviet Union.
- April 26 – President Johnson delivers remarks on his discussions with Chancellor Kurt Georg Kiesinger at the German Chancellery in Bonn.
- April 26 – President Johnson delivers remarks to American Physical Society members in the Main Ballroom at the Sheraton-Park Hotel in Washington.
- April 27 – President Johnson attends the dedication ceremony for the Crossland Vocational Center at Crossland Senior High School in Camp Springs, Maryland.
- April 27 – President Johnson signs Proclamation 3781, designating "April 28–29, 1967, as Rush-Bagot Agreement Days" and inviting "the Governors of the several States, the chief officials of local governments, and the people of the United States to observe these days with appropriate ceremonies and activities."
- April 28 – President Johnson delivers remarks on the career and service of Martha Raye in the East Room.
- April 28 – In a letter to Senate President Humphrey and House Speaker McCormick, President Johnson writes that a rail strike "would disrupt our commerce, cripple our industries, create shortages of food. It would adversely affect the lives of every man, woman, and child in this country" and that since he returned from Germany he has "consulted with the bipartisan leadership of the Congress, and with ranking members of the Senate Labor and House Commerce Committees."
- April 28 – President Johnson delivers remarks on the progress of the American military in Vietnam while attending a luncheon for General Westmoreland in the East Room.
- April 29 – In a statement, President Johnson announces that he is authorizing "the Secretary of Transportation to sign the contracts for the prototype construction of a commercial supersonic transport" while he personally sends Congress "a request for $198 million to finance the Government's share of the next phase of the development of this transport aircraft."
- April 29 – In a statement, President Johnson reflects on the "United States joined 50 other nations in contributing funds to preserve the great Abu Simbel Temples, in Egypt's Nubia" three years ago and the "task of saving Abu Simbel is unfinished – $3.5 million more is needed to reassemble the remaining two temples and restore them to a new site."

== May ==
- May 1 – President Johnson attends a reception for the 1966–1967 White House Fellows in the East Room.
- May 1 – Betty Furness is sworn in as Special Assistant to the President for Consumer Affairs in the East Room.
- May 1 – President Johnson transmits the fifth report under the Manpower Development and Training Act of 1962 to Congress in a message. President Johnson advocates for building more apprenticeship and work experience into employment, establishing more education opportunities, and creating a system where education and work experience are brought together to provide the youth with preparation fitting society's needs and mentions that to achieve this, he is "directing the Secretary of Labor and the Secretary of Health, Education, and Welfare to make a thorough study of the relationship between our educational programs and our manpower programs, between learning and earning in America."
- May 1 – President Johnson signs Executive Order 11349, amending Executive Order 11136 to change functions of the President's Commission on Consumer Interests and the Consumer Advisory Council.
- May 2 – In a letter to Senate President Humphrey, President Johnson transmits a request for a $75 million fiscal 1967 supplemental appropriation for the Office of Economic Opportunity, saying the request will enable the federal government "to respond to plans which have been developed by local communities across the land" and urging Congress to act on the matter.
- May 2 – President Johnson presents the Medal of Honor posthumously to Staff Sergeant Peter S. Connor in the Rose Garden.
- May 3 – President Johnson attends a dinner honoring Speaker of the House of Representatives John W. McCormack in the Regency Room at the Shoreham Hotel in Washington.
- May 3 – President Johnson delivers remarks to the State Directors of the Selective Service System in the Rose Garden.
- May 3 – President Johnson holds his one-hundredth news conference in his White House office, answering questions from reporters on American troops in Vietnam, troop deployment in Germany, the proposed nuclear nonproliferation agreement, the railroad labor dispute, the six percent surcharge proposal, draft opposition, campaign financing legislation, the Republican policy on Vietnam, pessimism over Vietnam, Russian offensive missiles in Vietnam, dissent on Vietnam, Communist leadership in antiwar dissent, the potential threat to his primary and secondary education bill in the House, and comments by Senator George Aiken regarding the Republican report on Vietnam.
- May 3 – President Johnson signs Executive Order 11350, amending regulations on the Selective Service.
- May 4 – In a message to Congress, President Johnson transmits "the reports of the Secretary of Defense and the Secretary of Transportation on cash awards made during Fiscal Year 1966 to members of the Armed Forces for suggestions, inventions, and scientific achievements."
- May 4 – President Johnson sends a special message to Congress listing his recommendation of procedures that can be used to resolve the railroad labor dispute.
- May 5 – In a statement, President Johnson discusses the plight of disadvantaged children in cities that cannot enjoy summers due to their location and that Americans can assist with their participation in the Share Your Summer campaign.
- May 6 – President Johnson attends the bust unveiling of former Mayor of Austin Tom Miller at the Municipal Auditorium in Austin, Texas.
- May 8 – President Johnson attends a reception for participants in the Conference on Women in the War on Poverty in the East Room.
- May 9 – President Johnson and Vice President of the Republic of China C. K. Yen deliver toasts during a luncheon in the State Dining Room.
- May 9 – In a statement, President Johnson says the Worldwide Drug Reaction Monitoring System "will be a vital health protection measure for people everywhere" and "a big step forward in protecting all people from these unforeseen hazards."
- May 9 – In a letter to Secretary of Health, Education, and Welfare John W. Gardner, President Johnson authorizes Gardner "to perform the functions vested in the President under the provisions of sections 5 (b) and (c) of that Act, as may be required to provide assistance by the United States in the World Health Organization International System to Monitor and Report Adverse Reactions to Drugs."
- May 9 – President Johnson attends the Democratic Congressional Dinner in the International Ballroom at the Washington-Hilton Hotel in Washington.
- May 9 – President Johnson delivers remarks at the welcoming ceremony of Vice President of the Republic of China Yen on the South Lawn.
- May 9 – President Johnson signs Proclamation 3782, urging "the people of the United States to honor our American Merchant Marine on Monday, May 22, 1967, by displaying the flag of the United States at their homes and other suitable places" and requesting "that all ships sailing under the American flag dress ship on that day in tribute to the American Merchant Marine."
- May 9 – President Johnson signs Proclamation 3783, designating "the week beginning May 21, 1967, as Small Business Week" and urging "industrial and commercial organizations, chambers of commerce, boards of trade, and other public and private organizations to participate in ceremonies recognizing the significant contributions, past and present, of small business to our land, our culture, and our ideals."
- May 10 – In a statement, President Johnson says he is "submitting to Congress an amendment to the 1968 budget, requesting $500,000 to finance architectural studies and plans for the Center's facilities" and estimates that by the early 1970s "the full program of the Center, including scholarships, stipends, and travel awards, will cost an estimated $12 million annually – including $1.2 million now spent each year for exchange programs of the Institutes."
- May 10 – President Johnson signs S. 303 into law. The legislation acts as an amendment to the previous law authorizing funds to the Trust Territory of the Pacific Islands government. President Johnson reports that he "already asked that the Congress appropriate additional funds, both this year and next, so that among other projects we can build schools, hospitals, roads, airfields, and communication facilities, hire teachers and doctors and nurses, and provide for the economic development of the area."
- May 10 – President Johnson and Vice President of the Republic of China Yen release a joint statement detailing their meeting the previous day.
- May 10 – President Johnson signs Proclamation 3784, requesting "that Sunday, May 14, 1967, be observed as Mother's Day" and directing "the appropriate officials of the Government to display the flag of the United States on all Government buildings on that day."
- May 11 – President Johnson transmits a "report of continued progress in the Nation's space program" to Congress in a message. President Johnson says the achievements listed in the report "reflect not only our progress in space flight, but also new steps taken toward the real objective of all our efforts in space – the application of new knowledge to bettering the lives of all people" and that the United States space program "continues to exemplify our Nation's conviction that the road to peace, progress, and abundance is through continued cooperation among all nations."
- May 13 – President Johnson addresses the Lawyers Conference on Crime Control in the Colonial Room at the Mayflower Hotel in Washington.
- May 15 – President Johnson attends a press briefing with governors in the auditorium of the National Guard Building at Bradley Field, Connecticut.
- May 15 – President Johnson attends the New England Governors Conference at Bradley Field, delivering remarks on the needs of Americans.
- May 16 – In a statement, President Johnson announces that a general agreement "has been reached on all the major issues in the trade negotiations" and states his hope that the final agreement meets the expectations of the Trade Extension Act of 1962.
- May 18 – President Johnson holds his one hundredth and first news conference in his White House office, answering questions from reporters on the cities' forecast, the Vietnam Pacification Program, the budget, objectives in Vietnam, congressional remarks on Vietnam, the United Nations and Vietnam, polls on his popularity, the imminence of World War III, the reassignment of General Lewis W. Walt, concessions to Southern members of Congress, action on the rent supplement bill in the House, domestic legislative program, Vietnam support and dissent, on becoming a grandfather, the nonproliferation treaty, relations with Red China, the upcoming presidential election and fundraising, pace of the Vietnam War, discussions with New England governors, and the government for the District of Columbia.
- May 19 – President Johnson delivers remarks to the State Committeemen and Executive Directors of the Agricultural Stabilization and Conservation Service in the East Room.
- May 19 – President Johnson signs S. 270 into law in the East Room. The legislation authorizes a desalting plant in Southern California and President Johnson says the administration "will outline plans as soon as that distinguished Californian, the Chairman of the Atomic Energy Commission, gets them ready for any other ventures that some of you want to take."
- May 19 – President Johnson awards the Presidential Unit Citation to the 1st Squadron, 4th Cavalry, 1st Infantry Division of the United States.
- May 22 – President Johnson signs Proclamation 3785, designating "Memorial Day, Tuesday, May 30, 1967, as a day of prayer for permanent peace" and urging "all of the people of this Nation to join me in prayer to the Almighty for the safety of our Nation's sons and daughters around the world, for His blessing on those who have sacrificed their lives for this Nation in this and all other struggles, and for His aid in building a world where freedom and justice prevail, and where all men live in friendship, understanding, and peace."
- May 22 – President Johnson signs Executive Order 11351, an amendment to Executive Order 11318 with the submission of "This order shall be effective as of May 31, 1966."
- May 22 – President Johnson signs Executive Order 11352, suspending "the provision of section 5751 (b) of title 10 of the United States Code which relates to the service-in-grade requirement for officers of the Marine Corps in the grade of lieutenant colonel for eligibility for consideration by a selection board for promotion to the next higher grade."
- May 23 – In a statement, President Johnson discusses the rising tension between Israel and its Arab neighbors as a situation concerning the international community and support by the community for "all efforts, in and outside the United Nations and through its appropriate organs, including the Secretary General, to reduce tensions and to restore stability."
- May 23 – In a statement, President Johnson announces that he is "signing an Executive order creating a Council on Cost Reduction in Government" that he is asking "to explore further opportunities for economy and better management."
- May 23 – President Johnson presents the Presidential "E" Awards for Excellence in Developing New Markets for Exports in the Rose Garden.
- May 23 – President Johnson delivers remarks to delegates of the International Conference on Water for Peace in the Grand Ballroom at the Sheraton Park Hotel in Washington.
- May 23 – President Johnson signs Executive Order 11354, an amendment to Executive Order 11030 in regards to presidential proclamation preparations.
- May 23 – President Johnson signs Executive Order 11353, forming the President's Advisory Council on Cost Reduction in addition to specifying membership and its functions.
- May 24 – President Johnson issues a statement on presenting the Distinguished Service Medal to Major General James W. Humphreys, Jr.
- May 24 – President Johnson delivers remarks to Japanese Governors on the development of the United States and Japan in the Cabinet Room.
- May 24 – President Johnson signs Proclamation 3786, designating "the period beginning September 17 and ending September 23, 1967, as Constitution Week" and urging "the people of the United States to observe that week with appropriate ceremonies and activities in their schools and churches, and in other suitable places, to the end that our citizens, whether they be naturalized or natural-born, may have a better understanding of the Constitution and of the rights and responsibilities of United States citizenship."
- May 25 – President Johnson presents the United States Gift to the Canadian people at the United States Pavilion during a visit to the Canadian Universal and International Exhibition in Montreal.
- May 25 – President Johnson and Prime Minister of Canada Lester B. Pearson attend a press briefing in which President Johnson reflects on the content of the meeting at Uplands R.C.A.F. Base in Ottawa.
- May 25 – President Johnson delivers remarks in Montreal upon attending EXPO '67 reflecting on Canada being the first country he visited after becoming U.S. President at the Place des Nations.
- May 25 – President Johnson sends a message to Congress on the subject of the American political process, proposing reforms in election campaign financing "to assure full disclosure of contributions and expenses, to place realistic limits on contributions, and to remove the meaningless and ineffective ceilings on campaign expenditures", providing "a system of public financing for Presidential election campaigns", enlarge "the base of public support for election campaigns, by exploring ways to encourage and stimulate small contributions", end "the loopholes in the Federal laws regulating lobbying", and assuring "the right to vote for millions of Americans who change their residences."
- May 26 – President Johnson issues a memorandum to the Secretary of the Interior and the Secretary of Transportation on oil pollution in coastal waters and asking them "to undertake, on an urgent basis, a study to determine how best to mobilize the resources of the Federal Government and the Nation to meet this problem."
- May 26 – President Johnson signs Executive Order 11355, amending subsection 305 (a) of Executive Order 10647 to read "At least once every twelve months the Chairman of the Civil Service Commission shall survey appointments made under section 710 (b) (1) of the Act."
- May 27 – President Johnson attends the christening of the U.S.S. John F. Kennedy at Newport News, Virginia with members of the Kennedy family including Jacqueline Kennedy and Senators Robert F. Kennedy and Ted Kennedy.
- May 27 – President Johnson signs S. 1161 into law, establishing the John Fitzgerald Kennedy National Historic Site.
- May 29 – President Johnson signs Proclamation 3787, proclaiming "October 15, 1967, as White Cane Safety Day" and calling "upon all our citizens, our civic and service organizations, schools, public bodies and the media of public information in every community to join in observing White Cane Safety Day, so that blind persons in our society may increasingly enjoy the greatest possible measure of personal independence."
- May 30 – President Johnson and President of the Republic of Vietnam Nguyễn Văn Thiệu exchange messages on the observance of Memorial Day.
- May 30 – President Johnson signs Executive Order 11356 in response to the dispute between the National Railway Labor Conference and its employees, forming "a board of three members, to be appointed by me, to investigate these disputes" that will "report its findings to the President with respect to the disputes within thirty days from the date of this order."
- May 31 – President Johnson transmits the annual report of the Railroad Retirement Board for Fiscal Year 1966 in a message to Congress. President Johnson says "increases in retirement and survivor benefits reported here represent increased comfort and security in the retirement years of many worthy citizens" and urges "the Congress to take this vital step toward our goal of providing every elderly citizen an adequate income and a meaningful retirement."
- May 31 – President Johnson transmits the fourth annual report on Special International Exhibitions conducted during fiscal year 1966 under the Mutual Educational and Cultural Exchange Act of 1961 in a message to Congress.

== June ==
- June 1 – President Johnson and Prime Minister of Australia Harold Holt attend a dinner in the State Dining Room.
- June 1 – President Johnson delivers remarks at the welcoming ceremony of Australian Prime Minister Holt on the South Lawn.
- June 1 – President Johnson transmits Reorganization Plan No. 3 of 1967 to Congress in a message. President Johnson says the intent of the plan is to bring "Twentieth Century government to the Capital of this Nation: to strengthen and modernize the government of the District of Columbia; to make it as efficient and effective as possible."
- June 2 – President Johnson attends a dinner in the State Dining Room honoring Prime Minister of the United Kingdom Harold Wilson.
- June 2 – President Johnson delivers remarks at the welcoming ceremony for United Kingdom Prime Minister Wilson on the South Lawn.
- June 3 – President Johnson attends the New York State Democratic Dinner in the Imperial Ballroom at the Americana Hotel in New York City.
- June 3 – In a statement, President Johnson announces "the formation of that committee, which will draw upon the talents and the experience of a group of distinguished industrialists, bankers, labor leaders, and specialists in urban affairs" and that it will be led by Edgar F. Kaiser.
- June 5 – The Six Day War is a massive victory for Israel over its Arab neighbors.
- June 6 – In a statement, President Johnson cites the urgency of enacting legislation that would "strengthen the reliability of the power systems" in the United States.
- June 6 – In a statement, President Johnson says the cease fire of the United Nations Security Council "pens a very hopeful path away from danger in the Middle East" and "reflects responsible concern for peace on the part of all who voted for it."
- June 6 – President Johnson signs Executive Order 11357, ordering "that the provisions of the National Traffic and Motor Vehicle Safety Act of 1966, as amended (80 Stat. 718, 943), shall be carried out through the National Highway Safety Bureau and the Director thereof."
- June 6 – President Johnson signs Executive Order 11358, ordering "that any income, excess-profits, estate, or gift tax return for the years 1948 to 1967, inclusive, shall, during the Ninetieth Congress, be open to inspection by the Committee on Un-American Activities, House of Representatives, or any duly authorized subcommittee thereof, for the purpose of carrying on those investigations of subversive and un-American activities and propaganda authorized by clause 18 of Rule XI of the Rules of the House of Representatives, agreed to January 10, 1967."
- June 7 – In a statement, President Johnson announces that he is "establishing a Special Committee of the National Security Council" in response to the "continuing crisis and the effort to help build a new peace".
- June 8 – In a letter to Mike Mansfield, President Johnson says that the most pressing concern of the United States "is to find a way to bring the fighting in the Middle East to an end" and the continuation of policies by the Truman, Eisenhower, and Kennedy administrations.
- June 8 – President Johnson and President of Malawi Hastings Banda deliver toasts at a luncheon in the State Dining Room.
- June 9 – In a memorandum, President Johnson cites the need for the United States to focus on Mexican American and asks "the Secretary of Labor, the Secretary of Health, Education, and Welfare, the Secretary of Housing and Urban Development, the Secretary of Agriculture and the Director of the Office of Economic Opportunity to serve on an interagency committee on Mexican American affairs."
- June 9 – Vicente T. Ximenes is sworn in as a member of the Equal Employment Opportunity Commission in the East Room.
- June 10 – President Johnson signs Proclamation 3788, designating "the week beginning June 11, 1967, as National Flag Week" and directing "the appropriate Government officials to display the flag on all Government buildings during that week."
- June 12 – President Johnson transmits the eleventh annual report of the Surgeon General on the Health Research Facilities Program for 1966 in a message to Congress.
- June 12 – President Johnson delivers remarks to the National Legislative Conference, Building and Construction Trades Department in the International Ballroom at the Washington Hilton Hotel.
- June 13 – In a statement, President Johnson notes rising accident rates and charges "every administrator in the Federal Government with personal responsibility to see that the causes of accidents in his operation are found and eliminated."
- June 13 – President Johnson attends a reception for the Presidential Scholars in the East Room.
- June 13 – President Johnson attends the graduation ceremony of Capitol Page School in the Rose Garden.
- June 13 – In the Rose Garden, President Johnson announces that he "shall send to the Senate this afternoon the nomination of Mr. Thurgood Marshall, Solicitor General, and the first African American, to the position of Associate Justice of the Supreme Court made vacant by the resignation of Justice Tom C. Clark of Texas."
- June 14 – President Johnson delivers remarks to delegates of National Rural Electric Cooperative Association Youth Conference on the South Lawn.
- June 14 – Alexander B. Trowbridge is sworn in as the 17th United States Secretary of Commerce in the Rose Garden.
- June 15 – While addressing reporters in his White House office, President Johnson announces the nomination of Warren Christopher as United States Deputy Attorney General.
- June 15 – President Johnson signs Proclamation 3789, designating "the week of June 18–24, 1967, as National Coal Week" and calling "upon citizens throughout the Nation to participate in observance of that week, in honor of the National Coal Association".
- June 16 – President Johnson attends a Democratic Party Dinner in the Civic Auditorium in Austin, Texas.
- June 27 – President Johnson delivers remarks to delegates to the National Convention of the United States Jaycees at the Civic Center in Baltimore, Maryland.
- June 29 – In a statement, President Johnson says the Education Professions Development Act of 1967 "is a basic building block for our schools and for our Nation. For no school – no matter how fine the building or how fancy its equipment – means as much as the men and women who work in it."
- June 29 – President Johnson and the King of Thailand release a joint statement detailing Johnson's expressed admiration "for the rapid economic development and improvement in education and social services that have taken place in Thailand under His Majesty's leadership" during the meeting between the two.
- June 29 – President Johnson addresses the Opportunities Industrialization Center on a spirit that has aided in the building of the center through domestic programs imposed during his administration.
- June 29 – President Johnson signs Executive Order 11359, an amendment of Executive Order 11278 that adds "the Secretary of Transportation" after "the Secretary of Housing and Urban Development".
- June 30 – In a statement, President Johnson confirms he has received the first annual report of the Citizens' Advisory Committee on Recreation and Natural Beauty and announces that he is directing "Secretary Trowbridge, as Chairman of the President's Council on Recreation and Natural Beauty, and Director Schultze of the Budget Bureau to review carefully the Committee report and within 90 days to make recommendations to me on steps which could be taken to implement it."
- June 30 – In a statement, President Johnson announces he has "signed a proclamation which will reduce dairy imports to the normal level which prevailed before 1966. On the basis of these new quotas, annual imports will be approximately 1 billion pounds of milk equivalent."
- June 30 – President Johnson signs Proclamation 3790, amending part 3 of the Appendix to the Tariff Schedules of the United States.
- June 30 – President Johnson signs Executive Order 11360, serving to amend regulations for the Selective Service.

== July ==
- July 1 – President Johnson signs the Older Americans Act Amendments of 1967 into law. President Johnson reflects on the intervention of President Franklin D. Roosevelt with the passing of the initial Social Security Act and notes that it has been a year since Medicare passed, saying the amendments are the highest increase in assistance in more than 30 years.
- July 1 – In a statement commemorating the anniversary of Medicare, President Johnson says the program "is fulfilling the promise that older Americans and their families will be free of the fear of major financial hardship because of illness" and calls it "a powerful force in upgrading the level of health care available to all Americans" while insisting that the forces behind its passage have formed "a partnership for a healthier America."
- July 1 – President Johnson holds his one hundred and third news conference at the Mayfair Hotel in St. Louis, Missouri. President Johnson begins the conference with an introduction from Governor of Iowa Harold Hughes and answers questions from reporters on the Middle East, support from the American people and governors, relationships between federal, state, and local governments, the Republican Governors Conference, crime and law enforcement, congressional ethics, a review of discussions with governors, the effectiveness of the poverty program, unity in the Democratic Party, Vietnam elections, the upcoming presidential election, and attitudes of the governors.
- July 1 – President Johnson delivers remarks to the Conference of Democratic Governors at the Mayfair Hotel in St. Louis.
- July 3 – In a letter to Senate President Humphrey and House Speaker McCormick, President Johnson transmits " to the Congress the report of the Secretary of the Interior resulting from the National Study of Strip and Surface Mining" and adds that the report "shows that much of the land which has been surface mined in the United States is now causing damage to our environment" in addition to also indicating "that present surface mining practices can and must be improved. Each year some 150,000 additional acres are being surface mined." He requests "all Federal agencies immediately review their policies dealing with surface mining on lands under their jurisdiction, and with contracts for the procurement of surface mined mineral commodities and fuels."
- July 3 – President Johnson signs Proclamation 3791, proclaiming "July 10, 1967, as World Law Day" and calling "upon all public and private officials, members of the legal profession, citizens, and all men of good will to demonstrate the importance of the law in mankind's quest for world peace by appropriate observances and ceremonies in courts, schools, universities, and other public places."
- July 4 – President Johnson issues a statement on the observance of Independence Day, calling on Americans to recall the battles of the past while they celebrate their freedoms of the present.
- July 6 – In a statement, President Johnson announces that the United States and Mexico governments "have concluded an agreement for the construction, operation, and maintenance of an international flood control project for the Tijuana River in California and in Baja California, Mexico" and thanks "the many Members of Congress who supported the legislation last year to authorize this project, and particularly Senator Kuchel and Representative Van Deerlin for their valuable leadership."
- July 6 – President Johnson signs Executive Order 11361, suspending "the provision of Section 5751(b) of Title 10 of the United States Code which relates to the service-in-grade requirement for officers of the Marine Corps in the grade of first lieutenant for eligibility for consideration by a selection board for promotion to the next higher grade."
- July 8 – In a statement, President Johnson states the report on the number of students assisted through the federal government "are dramatic evidence of the desire and ability of this country to help its young people attain their aspirations" and that the statistics "suggest that in only one generation we can attain a once impossible goal: that every American boy and girl will have the opportunity to move up the educational ladder as far as individual desire and ability permit."
- July 11 – In a statement, President Johnson states the need for the District of Columbia government to be reorganized and urges support from Congress on his plan.
- July 11 – President Johnson transmits the annual report of the Commodity Credit Corporation for fiscal year 1966 in a message to Congress.
- July 11 – President Johnson and Chancellor of Germany Ludwig Erhard deliver toasts at a luncheon in the State Dining Room.
- July 12 – President Johnson signs Proclamation 3792, proclaiming "where the work was subject to copyright under the laws of the United States of America on or after September 3, 1939, and on or before May 5, 1956, by an author or other owner who was then a German citizen; or where the work was subject to renewal of copyright under the laws of the United States of America on or after September 3, 1939, and on or before May 5, 1956, by an author or other person specified in Sections 24 and 25 of the aforesaid Title 17, who was then a German citizen, there has existed during several years of the aforementioned period such disruption and suspension of facilities essential to compliance with conditions and formalities prescribed with respect to such works by the copyright law of the United States of America as to bring such works within the terms of Section 9(b) of the aforesaid Title 17".
- July 12 – President Johnson signs Proclamation 3793, designating "the week beginning July 16, 1967 as Captive Nations Week" and inviting "the people of the United States of America to observe this week with appropriate ceremonies and activities, and I urge them to give renewed devotion to the just aspirations of all peoples for national independence and human liberty."
- July 13 – President Johnson holds his one hundred and fourth news conference in the living quarters of the White House. President Johnson begins an address on discussions concerning Vietnam and answers questions from reporters on the number of troops, the South Vietnamese effort, the basis for troop requests, impact of draft calls, tour of duty, the military situation, additional units, the position of North Vietnam, the request of General Westmoreland, North Vietnam forces, and if additional forces will be from other countries outside of the United States.
- July 13 – President Johnson presents the Distinguished Service Medal to Admiral David L. McDonald in the East Room.
- July 16 – President Johnson signs Executive Order 11362, constituting "a finding in pursuance of section 101(b) of the Defense Production Act of 1950, as amended, with respect to the exercise, as directed by section 2 of this order, of the powers vested in me by section 101(a) of that Act."
- July 17 – In a letter to House Speaker McCormick and Senate Majority Leader Mansfield, President Johnson recounts the meeting held the previous day as well as the current state of the railroad strike.
- July 17 – President Johnson signs SJ. Res. 81 into law. President Johnson says the legislation "brings a hopeful solution to this Nation in an hour of industrial crisis" and enables "the products of our farms and factories to move freely once more" and "the mails to be delivered once again."
- July 17 – President Johnson signs Proclamation 3794, amending Proclamation 3279 to state that the "maximum level of imports of residual fuel oil to be used as fuel into District 1, Districts II–IV, and District V for a particular allocation period shall be the level of imports of that product into those districts during the calendar year 1957 as adjusted by the Secretary as he may determine to be consonant with the objectives of this proclamation."
- July 20 – President Johnson signs Executive Order 11363, designating "the International Secretariat for Volunteer Service as a public international organization entitled to enjoy the privileges, exemptions, and immunities provided by the International Organizations Immunities Act."
- July 21 – President Johnson delivers remarks in the Auditorium of the Clinical Center at the National Institutes of Health on the attempts by the administration "to build a society which guarantees good health for all".
- July 22 – President Johnson issues a statement on the death of Carl Sandburg, hailing him as "more than the voice of America, more than the poet of its strength and genius."
- July 24 – President Johnson delivers remarks in the White House Theater on his sending federal troops to Detroit, Michigan in response to riots there.
- July 24 – In response to telegram from Governor of Michigan George Romney, President Johnson says he is deploying troops "to proceed at once to Selfridge Air Force Base, Michigan."
- July 24 – President Johnson signs Proclamation 3795, commanding "all persons engaged in such acts of violence to cease and desist therefrom and to disperse and retire peaceably forthwith."
- July 24 – President Johnson signs Executive Order 11364, authorizing and directing the United States Secretary of Defense "to take all appropriate steps to disperse all persons engaged in the acts of violence described in the proclamation and to restore law and order" and "call into the active military service of the United States, as he may deem appropriate to carry out the purposes of this order, any or all of the units of the Army National Guard and of the Air National Guard of the State of Michigan to serve in the active military service of the United States for an indefinite period and until relieved by appropriate orders."
- July 26 – President Johnson delivers remarks to delegates to Boys Nation in the Rose Garden.
- July 27 – President Johnson delivers an address in his White House office in which he announces that he is "appointing a special Advisory Commission on Civil Disorders" for the purpose of investigating the causes behind recent disorders in cities while making recommendations on measures that would either prevent or contain future incidents.
- July 27 – President Johnson delivers remarks at the Department of Defense Cost Reduction ceremony in the East Room.
- July 27 – President Johnson sends telegrams to Michigan Governor Romney and Mayor of Detroit Jerome Cavanagh on federal government assistance to the 12th Street riot.
- July 27 – President Johnson signs Proclamation 379, setting "aside Sunday, July 30, 1967, as a National Day of Prayer for Peace and Reconciliation" and calling "on every Governor, every Mayor, every family in the land to join in this observance."
- July 29 – President Johnson delivers remarks on the establishment of the National Advisory Commission on Civil Disorders in the Fish Room.
- July 29 – President Johnson signs Executive Order 11365, establishing the National Advisory Commission on Civil Disorders in addition to its membership and functions.
- July 31 – President Johnson holds his one hundredth and sixth news conference in his White House office. President Johnson begins the conference with an address on David Ginsburg accepting the position of Executive Director of the National Advisory Commission on Civil Disorders and answers questions from reporters on the Gallup poll on the administration's Vietnam policy, a speech by Secretary General U Thant, if he sees merit in a suggestion by Mayor Cavanagh for a 1,000-man Federal riot force, criticism he's received from the Democratic National Convention, the effect of riots on legislation, tax increase, the Taylor-Clifford mission, selection of the Advisory Commission on Civil Disorders, the position of the Philippines, President of Yugoslavia Josip Broz Tito, the effects of riots on Vietnam and space spending, what the administration plans for a national airport plan, proposals by Senator Morton giving Johnson "the power of transferability to take 10 percent of the long-range urban spending programs and apply it immediately to the problems of the cities", doubt on a summit meeting between the United States and allies occurring, executive action to prevent riots, disaster relief for Detroit, Michigan, the timing of the tax proposal, national spending priorities, the nuclear nonproliferation treaty, and discussions on the anti-ballistic missile.

== August ==
- August 1 – President Johnson signs Proclamation 3797, proclaiming "Tuesday, October 24, 1967, as United Nations Day" and urging "the citizens of this Nation to observe that day by means of community programs that will contribute to a realistic understanding of the aims, problems, and achievements of the United Nations and its associated organizations."
- August 2 – President Johnson signs Proclamation 3798, designating "the week beginning October 8, 1967, as Fire Prevention Week" and bidding "all citizens earnestly to support the fire prevention and control efforts of their community fire departments" while urging "State and local governments, the National Fire Protection Association, business and civic groups, and public information agencies to observe Fire Prevention Week, to provide useful fire safety information to the public, and to enlist the active participation of all citizens in year-round fire prevention programs."
- August 3 – President Johnson delivers remarks to the press on his meeting with Cyrus Vance and General Throckmorton in the Fish Room.
- August 3 – President Johnson holds his one hundred and seventh news conference in the Fish Room. President Johnson begins the conference with an announcement of the tax message going to Congress and answers questions from reporters on troop levels in Vietnam, the attitude of the Ways and Means Committee, the needed surtax size, effective dates and other possible formulas, the reaction of the business community and labor, revenue estimates in the tax message, and his reaction to opposition of the administration tax message by the Republican Coordinating Committee.
- August 3 – President Johnson sends a special message to Congress reflecting on the budget by the administration for the fiscal year of 1968 and his "directing each Department and Agency head to review every one of his programs, to identify reductions which can be made and to report to the Director of the Budget in detail on the actions he is taking to put those reductions into effect."
- August 4 – Clifford L. Alexander is sworn in as Chairman of the Equal Employment Opportunity Commission in the East Room.
- August 4 – President Johnson delivers remarks to the delegates to the Girls Nation on the accomplishments of American women through their participation in varying eras of United States history in the Rose Garden.
- August 4 – President Johnson signs Executive Order 11366, authorizing the Defense Secretary "to exercise the authority vested in the President by section 673a of title 10 of the United States Code, to order to active duty any member of the Ready Reserve of an armed force" that is not serving in a unit of the Ready Reserve.
- August 5 – Warren Christopher is sworn in as United States Deputy Attorney General in the Cabinet Room.
- August 8 – In a letter to House Speaker McCormick, President Johnson says the House of Representatives will be able to "strike the antiquated shackles from the government of the District of Columbia" the following day and reflects on the proposals of the reorganization plan for the District of Columbia that he submitted to Congress.
- August 8 – In a message to Congress, President Johnson transmits the third annual report of the Atlantic-Pacific Interoceanic Canal Study Commission.
- August 9 – In a statement, President Johnson says "the House of Representatives has voted to replace the rusted gears of government in the Nation's Capital with an efficient city management" and provided the United States with proof that its capitol belongs to Americans in supporting the reorganization plan legislation.
- August 9 – In letters to Chairman of the Senate Committee on Labor and Public Welfare Lister Hill and Chairman of the House Committee on Education and Labor Carl D. Perkins, President Johnson addresses the Guaranteed Loan Program, authorized under Tide IV-B of the Higher Education Act of 1965, entering its second full year of operation and reiterates problems that were identified within the program during its first year.
- August 11 – President Johnson reports that he has had a "very satisfactory and hopeful meeting" with Ambassador William C, Foster in the Fish Room.
- August 11 – In a statement, President Johnson reiterates the appointments of City Council members brought upon by the reorganization plan for the District of Columbia and calls for those "who are interested in the membership of the City Council to submit to me names of those individuals whom they consider qualified to sit on the Council and the reasons for their judgment."
- August 11 – In a statement, President Johnson says the United States has "seen the greatest advances in the Nation's history on behalf of the American consumer" in the last three years and reiterates several pieces of legislation that he wanted passed in the first session of the 90th United States Congress.
- August 12 – President Johnson vetoes H.R. 11089. President Johnson says he is returning the legislation without his approval "because it places too heavy a burden and levies too heavy a charge on the American taxpayer by providing private insurance out of public funds" and "sets an unwise precedent at a critical time in our history."
- August 12 – President Johnson signs Proclamation 3799, designating "the period of November 5 through November 11, 1967, as American Education Week" and calling "upon the American people to celebrate the achievements of their educational system, and to dedicate themselves to making it still more responsive to our Nation's needs."
- August 14 – President Johnson send a special message to Congress on the United States communications policy and relates activities surrounding the policy up to that point and reflects on the passage of the Communications Satellite Act of 1962.
- August 14 – In a message to Congress, President Johnson transmits "the Annual Report on the International Educational and Cultural Exchange Program conducted during fiscal year 1966 under the Mutual Educational and Cultural Exchange Act of 1961 (Public Law 87-256, the Fulbright-Hays Act)."
- August 14 – In a statement, President Johnson says the administration "has provided, through expanded veterans benefits, sound and substantial financing for advancing the education of those who have served in the Armed Forces" and that he has "directed the Secretary of Labor, in cooperation with the Secretary of Defense, to extend this activity nationwide in order to assure each returning veteran the greatest help possible in obtaining meaningful, rewarding employment."
- August 15 – President Johnson delivers remarks at the White House welcoming ceremony for Chancellor of Germany Kurt Georg Kiesinger on the South Lawn.
- August 15 – President Johnson and Germany Chancellor Kiesinger address the contents of their meeting while speaking with reporters in the Rose Garden.
- August 15 – President Johnson and Germany Chancellor Kiesinger deliver toasts at a dinner in the State Dining Room.
- August 16 – In a letter to Senate Majority Leader Mansfield, President Johnson reflects on the 662 million he had proposed for aiding model cities that had been reduced by the House of Representatives to 237 million while urging that it be restored to its entirety and mentions that Congress also has "a number of other programs proposed by the Administration which are concerned entirely or significantly with the urban problems of our nation."
- August 16 – In a statement, President Johnson speaks on the history of Labor Day and the need of the federal government to address the contemporary issue of one in every seven Americans living in poverty.
- August 16 – President Johnson and German Chancellor Kiesinger issue a joint statement on their meeting in Washington and shared conviction "that these regular, frank and far-reaching discussions of the international situation as well as of questions which are of particular concern to our two countries will solidify and strengthen the friendly relationship and trust that exists between us and between our two nations."
- August 16 – President Johnson presents the Vietnam Civilian Service Awards in the East Room.
- August 16 – In a letter to Senate President Humphrey and House Speaker McCormick, President Johnson suggests legislation that would create a school board of eleven members where three are elected and the rest are selected by neighbors in school districts as part of a reform on the education system in the District of Columbia.
- August 17 – President Johnson delivers remarks at a ceremony marking the sixth anniversary of the Alliance for Progress at the Pan American Union in Washington.
- August 17 – President Johnson issues a memorandum to United States Secretary of Housing and Urban Development Robert C. Weaver regarding a report from the President's Committee on Urban Housing and requesting Weaver "institute immediately a project of the type recommended by the Commission so that the desirability of a large scale program along these lines can be determined as soon as possible."
- August 17 – President Johnson and President of Côte d'Ivoire Félix Houphouët-Boigny deliver toasts during a luncheon in the State Dining Room.
- August 18 – President Johnson holds his one hundred and eighth news conference in the East Room. President Johnson answers questions from reporters on his current assessment of the Vietnam War, fairness of Vietnamese elections, domestic programs, a family that had lost a son in the war and had rejected his sympathetic letter as rhetoric for a senseless war, a proposal for a bombing pause after the Vietnamese elections, no stalemate in Vietnam, new bombing targets not being a threat to China, programs for the ghettos, farm prices, the Tonkin Gulf Resolution, oil shale development and the crisis in the Middle East, and methods of reducing the deficit.
- August 18 – President Johnson signs Proclamation 3800, proclaiming "August 20, 1967, as Bonneville Project Day" and urging "State and local public officials, industrial leaders, the press, and all private citizens in the Pacific Northwest and around the Nation to join in observing the Bonneville anniversary."
- August 18 – President Johnson signs Executive Order 11367, inserting "(5) Assistant Director for Executive Management, Bureau of the Budget, Executive Office of the President" into section 1 of Executive Order 11248.
- August 19 – President Johnson signs S. 1762 into law, extending the range of the Urban Studies Fellowship program. President Johnson admits the program by itself will not solve the issue of "manpower gap of qualified professionals in urban affairs" and that "awards were made for study in such fields as municipal administration, urban sociology, city and regional planning, urban law, and urban affairs with an emphasis on the social and economic problems of urban development."
- August 21 – In a letter to Senate President Humphrey and House Speaker McCormick, President Johnson urges "the Congress to join me in taking a further step toward self-determination for the 93,000 Micronesian people who live in the Mariana, Caroline and Marshall Islands that comprise the Trust Territory of the Pacific Islands."
- August 21 – President Johnson presents the Medal of Honor to Gunnery Sgt. Jimmie E. Howard in the East Room.
- August 21 – President Johnson signs S. 1296 into law. President Johnson says the legislation is "a $4.86 billion authorization for the National Aeronautics and Space Administration for fiscal 1968" and that the administration and Congress must address the issue of the space program.
- August 22 – President Johnson delivers remarks at the welcoming ceremony for Mohammad Reza Pahlavi on the South Lawn.
- August 22 – President Johnson and Mohammad Reza Pahlavi deliver toasts at a dinner in the State Dining Room.
- August 23 – President Johnson and the Shah of Iran issue a joint statement on the content of their meeting including their reviews of "preliminary plans for cooperation in studying the development of water resources in certain areas of Iran" and "the world situation and particularly the situation in the Middle East, and they agreed that a solution to the current tensions in the area should be sought in strict compliance with the principles of the United Nations Charter."
- August 23 – President Johnson delivers remarks at the 12th Annual Program of the Council of International Programs for Youth Leaders and Social Workers in the State Dining Room.
- August 24 – In a statement, President Johnson says "Geneva the United States and the Soviet Union as Cochairmen of the Eighteen-Nation Disarmament Committee are submitting to the Committee a draft treaty to stop the spread of nuclear weapons" and that the treaty "must reconcile the interests of nations with our interest as a community of human beings on a small planet" and "be responsive to the needs and problems of all the nations of the world-great and small, aligned and nonaligned, nuclear and nonnuclear."
- August 25 – President Johnson issues a statement on the death of Henry J. Kaiser, saying Kaiser's "energy, imagination, and determination gave him greatness".
- August 25 – President Johnson signs Proclamation 3801, proclaiming a national "Stay in School" campaign and calling on Americans to make the campaign successful through their participation.
- August 28 – In a statement, President Johnson says the Senate Appropriations Committee has reaffirmed the pledge of the United States to bring "new hope and progress" to American cities after the committee voted for the full $40 million that he had supported.
- August 28 – President Johnson says the "plan for creation of a new reserve facility at the International Monetary Fund marks the greatest forward step in world financial cooperation in the 20 years since the creation of the International Monetary Fund itself" and addresses the details of the plan that had been agreed to in London in the Fish Room.
- August 28 – In a letter to Senate President Humphrey and House Speaker McCormick, President Johnson transmits "the sixth and final semi-annual report of Federal agency activity under the authority of Public Law 88-451 to assist Alaska to recover from the earthquake which she suffered in 1964."
- August 28 – President Johnson signs Proclamation 3802, "designating the first full week of October of each year as National Employ the Physically Handicapped Week" and urging "all public and private organizations and all citizens to renew their dedication to this volunteer effort to further job opportunities for the handicapped."
- August 28 – President Johnson signs Executive Order 11368, designating the "tax imposed by section 4911 of the Internal Revenue Code of 1954 on the acquisition of a debt obligation shall be equal to a percentage of the actual value of the debt obligation measured by the period remaining to its maturity and determined in accordance" with a table and amending Executive Order 11211.
- August 29 – President Johnson signs Executive Order 11369, amending section 2 of Executive Order 11248 to include "(15) Administrator, Social and Rehabilitation Service, Department of Health, Education, and Welfare" and "(16) Chief, Children's Bureau, Social and Rehabilitation Service, Department of Health, Education, and Welfare."
- August 30 – In a statement, President Johnson says the spacious open tract "can become a new, attractive, and well-balanced community at a major gateway to the Nation's Capital" while also providing "comfortable and urgently needed housing, built and operated under the new 'Turnkey' concept."
- August 30 – President Johnson attends a meeting with the President's Committee on Mental Retardation To Receive the Committee's First Report in the Rose Garden.
- August 30 – President Johnson signs Proclamation 3803, calling upon Americans "to observe the week beginning October 8, 1967, as National School Lunch Week, with ceremonies and activities designed to increase public understanding and awareness of the significance of the National School Lunch Program to the child, to the home, to the farm, to industry, and to the Nation."
- August 30 – President Johnson signs Executive Order 11370, ordering "that any income, estate, or gift tax return for the years 1956 to 1968, inclusive, shall, during the Ninetieth Congress, be open to inspection by the Committee on Public Works, House of Representatives, or any duly authorized subcommittee thereof, in connection with its investigation of the policies, procedures, and practices involved in the administration of the Federal-Aid Highway Program, pursuant to House Resolution 203, 90th Congress, agreed to February 27, 1967."
- August 31 – President Johnson signs the Veterans' Pension and Readjustment Assistance Act of 1967 into law in the East Room. President Johnson says the legislation "gives returning servicemen more money to help them pursue their education, or train for jobs and skills under the new GI bill that we signed last year."

== September ==
- September 8 – In a memorandum to department and agency leadership, President Johnson announces the establishment of a committee that will review the effects of Executive Order 10988 and that he is requesting "the review committee to proceed immediately with its study and to report to me its findings and recommendations as soon as practicable."
- September 13 – President Johnson delivers remarks on the American city being the most promising opportunity and "urgent domestic problem in America" during remarks in the Cabinet Room.
- September 13 – President Johnson delivers remarks at a dinner honoring Japanese foreign ministers in the State Dining Room.
- September 14 – President Johnson delivers remarks at a meeting of the International Association of Chiefs of Police at the Municipal Auditorium in Kansas City, Missouri.
- September 15 – President Johnson speaks on the unanimous report from the Special Railroad Board during a press briefing in the Fish Room.
- September 15 – In a letter to Senate President Humphrey and Speaker McCormick, President Johnson reflects on how much time has passed since the University of Texas tower shooting and Congress still not having acted on the State Firearms Control Act of 1967 while advocating for the law.
- September 15 – President Johnson awards the Presidential Unit Citation to the 1st Cavalry Division (Airmobile) and Attached Units on the South Lawn.
- September 17 – President Johnson attends a memorial service for Carl Sandburg at the Lincoln Memorial.
- September 18 – President Johnson attends an Employer of the Year ceremony to honor handicapped employees in the Cabinet Room.
- September 18 – President Johnson delivers remarks at the White House welcoming ceremony for President of Italy Giuseppe Saragat on the South Lawn.
- September 18 – President Johnson signs Executive Order 11372, designating "the Lake Ontario Claims Tribunal as a public international organization entitled to enjoy the privileges, exemptions, and immunities conferred by the International Organizations Immunities Act."
- September 18–19 – President Johnson and Italian President Saragat meet in Washington for "a broad and thorough exchange of views on the international situation" and a "review of issues of bilateral concern, with a view to strengthening further the close relations between the two countries in accordance with the long-standing ties of friendship and alliance which exist between Italy and the United States."
- September 19 – President Johnson and Italy President Saragat deliver toasts at a dinner in the State Dining Room.
- September 20 – In a letter to United States Secretary of Transportation Alan S. Boyd, President Johnson asks Boyd "to develop a long-range comprehensive plan for the facilities, equipment and personnel" that would meet the needs of those having to pay additional expenditures as it relates to the air traffic control system and that the plan "should be accompanied by a proposal for financing the improvements through a system of charges by which the users of the Nation's airways bear their fair share of its costs."
- September 20 – President Johnson signs Executive Order 11373, authorizing transfers from the National Capital Transportation Agency to the Washington Metropolitan Area Transit Authority.
- September 22 – In a statement, President Johnson says the Education Professions Development Act of 1967 "will greatly contribute to the Nation's ability to solve one of the key problems of education: the development and enlistment of better equipped teachers for our schools and colleges."
- September 22 – President Johnson addresses representatives of National Fraternal Organizations in the East Room.
- September 22 – President Johnson delivers remarks at a luncheon honoring foreign ministers attending a meeting of American heads of state in the State Dining Room.
- September 22 – President Johnson signs H.R. 9547 into law in the East Room. President Johnson says the legislation "authorizes a United States contribution of some $900 million to the Inter-American Development Bank over the next 3 years."
- September 22 – President Johnson delivers remarks to voluntary organizations on the net financial wealth of American families having increased by 150 billion and the 7 million Americans presently working as well as problems that have occurred in the midst of these statistics in the Rose Garden.
- September 23 – President Johnson signs Proclamation 3804, proclaiming "the week beginning September 24, 1967, as National Highway Week" and urging "Federal, State and local officials, as well as highway industry and other organizations, to hold appropriate ceremonies during that week in recognition of what highway transportation means to our Nation."
- September 25 – President Johnson submits the annual report of the St. Lawrence Seaway Development Corporation for the year ending December 31, 1966 in a message to Congress. President Johnson urges Congress to approve of the report's measures.
- September 25 – President Johnson signs Proclamation 3805, urging Americans to join in "commemorating Saturday, November 11, 1967, as Veterans Day with suitable observances" and directing "the appropriate officials of the Government to arrange for the display of the flag of the United States on all public buildings on that day" while requesting "the officials of Federal, State, and local governments, and civic and patriotic organizations to give their enthusiastic leadership and support to appropriate public ceremonies throughout the Nation."
- September 25 – President Johnson signs Proclamation 3806, designating "Monday, October 2, 1967, as Child Health Day" and inviting "all persons and all agencies and organizations interested in the health and welfare of children to unite on that day in observances that will bolster our efforts to foster their growth into full participants in our society."
- September 26 – In a statement, President Johnson says the United Community Campaigns of America offers "every American a personal opportunity to help shape a better America" and calls for Americans to make donations to assist those being aided by the campaigns.
- September 26 – In a special message to Congress, President Johnson proposes "that the Congress authorize a United States contribution of up to $200 million to new Special Funds of the Asian Development Bank" and that the authorization will not involve budget expenditures from the fiscal year of 1968.
- September 26 – President Johnson delivers remarks at the welcoming ceremony for President of Niger Diori Hamani on the South Lawn.
- September 26 – President Johnson and Niger President Diori deliver toasts at a dinner in the State Dining Room.
- September 26 – In a letter to Chairman of the Committee on the District of Columbia Alan Bible, President Johnson writes that "the House of Representatives acted to bring democracy closer to the citizens of the District of Columbia by making them responsible for the election of their own school board" through its overwhelming approval of "the much needed modernization of the District's educational system" that he submitted to Congress the previous month.
- September 26 – President Johnson signs Proclamation 3807, designating "Wednesday, October 11, 1967, as General Pulaski's Memorial Day" and directing "the appropriate Government officials to display the flag of the United States on all Government buildings on that day" and inviting "the people of the United States to observe the day with appropriate ceremonies in honor of the memory of General Pulaski and his dedication to the defense of liberty."
- September 27 – President Johnson says his discussion with United Kingdom Secretary of State for Foreign Affairs George Brown, Baron George-Brown was an exchange of views while declining to divulge further details while speaking to reporters in his White House office.
- September 27 – During a ceremony in the Rose Garden attended by Senators George D. Aiken, Robert Byrd, Allen J. Ellender, and J. Caleb Boggs and House members Leonor K. Sullivan, Graham Purcell, and W. R. Poage, President Johnson signs S. 953, an extension of the Food Stamp Act of 1964. President Johnson asks the Agriculture Secretary "to help America's 300 poorest counties which do not now have food assistance to start a community distribution program to be available for the low-income families."
- September 27 – President Johnson signs Proclamation 3808, designating "Monday, October 9, 1967, as Leif Erikson Day" and directing "the appropriate Government officials to display the flag of the United States on all Government buildings on that day" while inviting "the people of the United States to honor the memory of Leif Erikson on that day by holding appropriate exercises and ceremonies in schools and churches, or other suitable places."
- September 28 – Walter E. Washington and Thomas W. Fletcher are sworn in as Commissioner of the District of Columbia and Assistant to the Commissioner in the East Room.
- September 28 – President Johnson presents the Medal of Honor to Sgt. David C. Dolby in the East Room.
- September 28 – President Johnson says the administration was "very proud that our neighboring country of Mexico, through its President, could work so cooperatively with the United States in meeting the common problem" of damage resulting from Hurricane Beulah while speaking at the Harlingen Industrial Airport.
- September 28 – President Johnson signs Proclamation 3809, designating "the week of November 17 through November 23, 1967, as National Farm–City Week" and requesting "that leaders of farmers' organizations, business groups and labor unions, youth and women's clubs, civic associations, and all consumers join in this observance to increase public appreciation of agriculture as the vital base of our Nation's economy and of our individual well-being."
- September 29 – President Johnson delivers an address on Vietnam to the National Legislative Conference at the Villita Assembly Hall in San Antonio, Texas.
- September 30 – President Johnson signs the Department of Defense Appropriation Act, 1968 into law. President Johnson says the legislation "appropriates nearly $70 billion" to preserve freedom and strength in the United States and notes several provisions that he does not agree with including the 1.6 billion below his January budget.
- September 30 – President Johnson holds his one hundred and eleventh news conference at the LBJ Ranch. President Johnson begins the conference with an announcement that Stephen Pollak will be returning to the Justice Department and answers question from reporters on communications between the Pope and U Thant, his speech in San Antonio, the response from Southeast Asia since the speech, Dean Griswold, his plans to run for re-election, specific cuts in programs, and the need for a tax increase.

== October ==
- October 2 – President Johnson issues a memorandum to department and agency heads on the launch of a "major test program to mobilize the resources of private industry and the Federal Government to help find jobs and provide training for thousands of America's hard-core unemployed" and the need of "the concerted action and involvement of the private sector, working closely with the Federal Government" to succeed.
- October 2 – President Johnson signs Proclamation 3810 calling on "the people of the United States to observe the week beginning October 15, 1967, as National Forest Products Week, with activities and ceremonies designed to direct public attention to the essential role that our forest resources play in stimulating the advancement of our economy and the continued prosperity of the entire Nation."
- October 3 – President Johnson signs the Vocational Rehabilitation Act Amendments of 1967 into law in the East Room. President Johnson says the legislation "extends rehabilitation service to migrant laborers – the poorest among us, the most needy among us" and "increases Federal support for rehabilitation here in our Nation's Capital."
- October 3 – President Johnson signs Proclamation 3811 calling "upon the Administrator of the National Aeronautics and Space Administration and the people of the United States to join, during the week of October 1 through October 7, 1967, in commemorating the fiftieth anniversary of the establishment of the Langley Research Center at Hampton, Virginia, with appropriate ceremonies and activities."
- October 4 – In a statement, President Johnson announces he has asked "the United States Tariff Commission to report to me by January 15, 1968, in the fullest detail possible on the economic condition of the United States textile and apparel industries."
- October 4 – President Johnson delivers remarks to the National Conference of Cooperative Organizations in the Departmental Auditorium.
- October 5 – In a statement, President Johnson expresses delight "with the cordial reception given Dr. Hornig and his colleagues by the Chinese Government and by the interest shown in their mission."
- October 5 – President Johnson holds his one hundredth and twelfth news conference in his White House office. President Johnson begins the conference with remarks on the appropriations enabled by his signing of House Joint Resolution 853 and his relations with Congress before answering questions from reporters on how much can be squeezed out of the often called inflatable 21 billion, the cost of the inflation tax, and his reply to the Ways and Means Committee.
- October 6 – President Johnson addresses officials of the Federal Home Loan Bank System on the thirty-fifth anniversary of its founding in the Cabinet Room.
- October 6 – In a statement, President Johnson announces that he is "appointing a National Advisory Commission on Health Facilities to undertake a thorough study and to make recommendations" and that the commission will be chaired by Atlanta, Georgia native Boisfeuillet Jones.
- October 6 – In a letter to Senate President Humphrey and House Speaker John McCormack, President Johnson says the Wilderness Act of 1964 would give the federal government the authority to preserve the San Rafael Wilderness and his proposal for "three additional areas – in California, Oregon, and Wyoming – also be proclaimed wilderness areas."
- October 6 – President Johnson signs Proclamation 3812, setting the upcoming October 18 as "National Day of Prayer".
- October 7 – President Johnson attends the Salute to the President Democratic Party dinner in the International Ballroom at the Washington Hilton Hotel.
- October 8 – President Johnson issues a statement on the death of Clement Attlee, who he hails as one of the greatest leaders of the United Kingdom and having devoted himself to a career in public service.
- October 8 – President Johnson delivers remarks to delegates to the International Conference on the World Crisis in Education at the Conference Center in Williamsburg, Virginia.
- October 9 – President Johnson signs Proclamation 3813, designating "Thursday, October 12, 1967, as Columbus Day" and inviting the American people "to observe that day in schools, churches, and other suitable places with appropriate ceremonies in honor of the great explorer."
- October 10 – President Johnson and President of Ghana Joseph Arthur Ankrah deliver remarks at a luncheon in the State Dining Room.
- October 10 – President Johnson delivers remarks announcing the United States has entered into the Outer Space Treaty in the East Room. President Johnson says the treaty "outlaws the weapons of mass destruction from man's newest frontier", "forbids military bases and fortifications on the moon and other celestial bodies", "prohibits the testing of weapons in space", and "means that when man reaches the moon, he will land in a field of peace – not a new theater of war."
- October 11 – President Johnson signs the Small Business Act Amendments of 1967 into law. Johnson says the legislation "continues and expands the many worthwhile programs administered by SBA", "allows SBA to make more loans from its own funds, up $650 million to a new high of $2 .65 billion", "extends from 10 to 15 years the repayment time for construction and renovation loans", "improves the small business investment companies which provide a vital flow of private capital to small businesses", and "enlists the services of more retired businessmen, so that their still valuable skills and knowledge can be made available to greater numbers of small concerns."
- October 11 – President Johnson signs Executive Order 11374, abolishing the Missile Sites Labor Commission while transferring its functions and responsibilities to the Federal Mediation and Conciliation Service.
- October 11 – President Johnson signs Proclamation 3814, proclaiming "the week of December 10 through 17, 1967, to be Human Rights Week and the year 1968 to be Human Rights Year" and calling "upon all Americans and upon all Government agencies – federal, state and local – to use this occasion to deepen our commitment to the defense of human rights and to strengthen our efforts for their full and effective realization both among our own people and among all the peoples of the United Nations."
- October 11 – President Johnson signs Proclamation 3815, authorizing an extension of duty being increased on carpet and rug imports.
- October 11 – President Johnson signs Proclamation 3816, proclaiming "that the remaining increased rates of duty on imports of sheet glass provided for in items 923.31 through 923.77 in Subpart A of Part 2 of the Appendix to the Tariff Schedules of the United States are extended to articles entered, or withdrawn from warehouse, for consumption during the period beginning on October 12, 1967, and ending at the close of December 31, 1969, unless the President proclaims otherwise pursuant to Section 351(c) (1) or (2) of the Trade Expansion Act of 1962."
- October 12 – President Johnson attends a meeting with the President's Committee on Consumer Interests in the Cabinet Room.
- October 12 – President Johnson reaffirms the intent of the administration to "eliminate any unnecessary barriers to the freer flow of trade" prior to stating his intent to authorize the escape clause tariff "on typewriter ribbon cloth and stainless steel flatware to terminate" and requests the federal departments try "to maintain surveillance over these industries to determine if other assistance is appropriate at a later date."
- October 12 – President Johnson issues telegrams to the two final teams, the Red Sox and the Cardinals of the 1967 World Series.
- October 13 – President Johnson presents the Harmon International Aviation Trophies in the Rose Garden.
- October 13 – President Johnson signs Executive Order 11375, serving as an amendment to Executive Order 11246 that changes Section 101 of Part I to read, "It is the policy of the Government of the United States to provide equal opportunity in Federal employment for all qualified persons, to prohibit discrimination in employment because of race, color, religion, sex or national origin, and to promote the full realization of equal employment opportunity through a positive, continuing program in each executive department and agency. The policy of equal opportunity applies to every aspect of Federal employment policy and practice."
- October 16 – In a statement, President Johnson says the administration offers "civilian job opportunities or training to these service men and women and we help to meet the demand for the best in medical care and service."
- October 17 – President Johnson and Prime Minister of Singapore Lee Kuan Yew deliver toasts at a dinner in the Family Dining Room.
- October 17 – President Johnson delivers remarks welcoming Prime Minister Lee on the South Lawn.
- October 17 – President Johnson signs Executive Order 11376, amending Executive Order 11022 to state that the President's Council on Aging "shall be composed of the Secretary of Health, Education, and Welfare, who shall be Chairman, the Secretary of Agriculture, the Secretary of Commerce, the Secretary of Housing and Urban Development, the Secretary of Labor, the Secretary of Transportation, the Secretary of the Treasury, the Chairman of the Civil Service Commission, the Administrator of Veterans' Affairs and the Director of the Office of Economic Opportunity."
- October 21 – In a statement, President Johnson says the Military Construction Authorization Act for fiscal year 1968 "authorizes $2.3 billion for the construction of such projects as air bases, hospitals, barracks, and naval depots" and "the brick and mortar to modernize our military installations not only in Southeast Asia, but throughout the world."
- October 23 – In a memorandum, President Johnson states his satisfaction with the performance of American troops during peace demonstrations at Lincoln Memorial and the Pentagon.
- October 23 – President Johnson delivers remarks to employees of the International Federation of Commercial, Clerical, and Technical in the Regency Room at the Shoreham Hotel in Washington.
- October 23 – Erwin N. Griswold is sworn in as the 34th Solicitor General of the United States in the Cabinet Room.
- October 23 – President Johnson signs Executive Order 11377, ordering that "the United States Tariff Commission shall keep under review developments with regard to whiskbrooms of a kind provided for in items 750.26 to 750.28, inclusive, of the tariff schedules, and other brooms of a kind provided for in items 750.29 to 750.31, inclusive, of such schedules, and shall annually report to the President, as early as practicable in each calendar year, its judgment as to the estimated annual consumption of each such kind of brooms during the immediately preceding calendar year, together with the basis therefor."
- October 24 – President Johnson and President of Cameroon Ahmadou Ahidjo deliver remarks at a luncheon in the State Dining Room.
- October 25 – President Johnson transmits the eleventh annual report on the Trade Agreements Program in a message to Congress.
- October 25 – President Johnson presents the Medal of Honor to Maj. Howard V. Lee in the East Room.
- October 26 – President Johnson delivers remarks at the welcoming ceremony for President of Mexico Diaz Ordaz on the South Lawn regarding the intent by Mexico to follow through on promises made to partnering nations.
- October 26 – President Johnson and Mexican President Ordaz attend a ceremony in which the two receive honorary degrees in the Rose Garden.
- October 26 – President Johnson and Mexican President Ordaz delivers a toast at a dinner in the State Dining Room.
- October 27 – President Johnson attends the dedication of the Theodore Roosevelt Memorial at the site of the memorial on Theodore Roosevelt Island in the Potomac River.
- October 27 – President Johnson signs Proclamation 3817, proclaiming "October 31, 1967, and October 31 in each subsequent year, as National UNICEF Day."
- October 28 – President Johnson attends the Chamizal Ceremony at the Chamizal Monument at Juarez, Chihuahua, Mexico reflecting on his past experiences with issues pertaining to the Chamizal dispute.
- October 28 – President Johnson delivers remarks to Delegates to the Mexican-American Conference at the Hilton Inn in El Paso, Texas.
- October 30 – In a letter to Chairman of the ABA Special Committee on Crime Prevention and Control Leon Jaworski, President Johnson says he is "encouraged to know that the American Bar Association is focusing on law enforcement as a primary area of its activity."
- October 31 – President Johnson signs Executive Order 11378, granting Postmaster at San Antonio Daniel J. Quill an exemption from compulsory retirement from age.

== November ==
- November 1 – Mahendra of Nepal begins a state visit to the United States at the invitation of President and First Lady Johnson.
- November 1 – President Johnson and Mahendra of Nepal attend a dinner in the State Dining Room in which they discuss diplomatic relations conducted during the day.
- November 1 – President Johnson delivers remarks welcoming Mahendra of Nepal and speaking of the new version of Nepal envisioned by its contemporary leadership on the South Lawn.
- November 1 – President Johnson holds his one hundred and thirteenth news conference in the Cabinet Room. President Johnson begins with an address on a Cabinet meeting, the impact of economic progress, the report on social and economic progress of blacks in the United States, and congressional actions on urban programs and proceeds to answer questions from reporters on the possibility of a tax increase, pending legislation, pending legislation, inflation, effects of peace demonstrations, assessment of the Vietnam situation, American policy in Southeast Asia, urban problems, new government in Vietnam, the stock market and the economy, Vietnam policy, and congressional action on administration programs.
- November 2 – President Johnson delivers remarks to the Delegates to the 1967 Consumer Assembly in the Regency Room at the Shoreham Hotel in Washington.
- November 2 – In a statement, President Johnson says the report Social and Economic Conditions of Negroes in the United States "backs up neither of the extreme positions that emerged in the wake of the summer disturbances. It does not confirm the diagnosis of bleakness and despair: that there has been no recent progress for Negroes in America and that violence is therefore a logical remedy."
- November 2 – In a message to members of the Foreign Service on Foreign Service Day, President Johnson says the ability of the federal government "to employ our vast resources to best advantage rests – in large measure – on the skill and dedication of those principally responsible for our foreign relations" and "Americans in foreign service carry the major burden of representing the American people and their interests abroad."
- November 3 – In a statement, President Johnson says the Independent Offices and HUD Appropriation Act for fiscal year 1968 "represents a cut from the budget request of January of more than $600 million" and notes Republican opposition to the measure.
- November 3 – Members of the New District of Columbia Council are sworn in during a morning ceremony in the East Room. President Johnson delivers remarks on what he calls a historic days and states the objectives of the council.
- November 6 – In a statement, President Johnson confirms that he has been informed "by the Chairman of the Trustees of the National Gallery, Chief Justice Earl Warren, that a gift of $20 million has been made to the National Gallery of Art."
- November 6 – President Johnson transmits "a report of our food aid programs during calendar year 1966" to Congress in a message. He notes that the report "marks a year in which the productivity of American agriculture and the generosity of the American people have done much to help others to help themselves" while stating the six main elements of the new strategy.
- November 6 – President Johnson signs Proclamation 3818, a termination of interim agreements between the United States and Canada, the United Kingdom, and Japan.
- November 7 – In a statement on the death of former Vice President John Nance Garner, President Johnson notes the longevity of Garner and notes his contributions to public service as being matched by few.
- November 7 – In a statement, President Johnson extends "cordial greetings and best wishes to the peoples of the Union of Soviet Socialist Republics on the occasion of their national holiday, which this year marks the 50th anniversary of the establishment of the Soviet Government."
- November 7 – President Johnson reaffirms American support for the Multinational Program for Science and Technology in Latin America in a statement.
- November 7 – President Johnson signs the Public Broadcasting Act of 1967 in the East Room. President Johnson says the legislation "will give a wider and, I think, stronger voice to educational radio and television by providing new funds for broadcast facilities" and "launch a major study of television's use in the Nation's classrooms and their potential use throughout the world" while establishing the Corporation for Public Broadcasting.
- November 8 – President Johnson announces that "Acting Secretary of Agriculture John Schnittker has today signed the new International Grains Arrangement on behalf of the United States Government" and promotes it as establishing "new minimum prices in world trade for 14 major wheats. For U.S. wheats, the new minimums are generally about 23 cents a bushel higher than under the old International Wheat Agreement" and "a new program under which developed wheat exporting and importing nations will provide 4.5 million tons of food grain or cash equivalent annually to less developed countries – the first time this has ever been done on a regular and continuing basis."
- November 8 – President Johnson transmits the Surgeon General's first report on Regional Medical Programs, as required by the Heart Disease, Cancer and Stroke Amendments of 1965 to Congress in a message.
- November 8 – In a statement, President Johnson cites his need for "the coordinated advice and help of every Federal agency with major responsibilities in science and technology."
- November 15 – President Johnson answers questions from reporters on if he discussed protectionism and quota legislation with Prime Minister Sato and if the topic of Communist China came up.
- November 15 – President Johnson transmits the annual report on United States Participation in the United Nations for the calendar year 1966 to Congress in a message.
- November 15 – President Johnson signs the Foreign Assistance Act of 1967 into law. President Johnson says the legislation "reaffirms the basic principles which have guided America's foreign economic policy for two decades" and "proclaims our readiness to help those who help themselves in mankind's unrelenting struggle against poverty, ignorance, and disease."
- November 16 – President Johnson presents the Medal of Honor to Staff Sgt. Charles B. Morris in the East Room.
- November 17 – President Johnson holds his one hundred and fourteenth news conference in the East Room. President Johnson answers questions from reporters on force level of Vietnam, appraising criticism of the president, the bombing of North Vietnam, the willingness of the Vietcong to negotiate, his re-election campaign, his assessment of the Vietnam situation, Hanoi's interpretation of public opinion of the United States, prospect for passing a tax bill, the intentions of Senator McCarthy, public opinion of Vietnam, cutback in foreign aid, Vietnam dissenters, and American arms in Vietnam.
- November 18 – In a statement responding to the decision of the United Kingdom to change the par value of the pound sterling from $2.80 to $2.40, President Johnson says "this decision was made with great reluctance, and I understand the powerful reasons that made it necessary under the circumstances."
- November 18 – President Johnson delivers telephonic remarks to the Centennial Convention of the National Grange from the Cabinet Room.
- November 20 – President Johnson delivers remarks to members of the press on the National Advisory Commission on Health Manpower report becoming public in the East Room.
- November 20 – President Johnson attends a ceremony commemorating the birth of the 200 Millionth American in the main lobby at the Department of Commerce.
- November 20 – President Johnson signs S.J. Res. 33 into law in the East Room. President Johnson says the legislation, which establishes the National Commission on Product Safety, has three primary duties including spotting dangerous products, the effectiveness of present laws, and stopping tragedies before they strike.
- November 20 – President Johnson attends a dinner for Senator Everett Dirksen in the Main Ballroom at the Mayflower Hotel in Washington.
- November 21 – President Johnson signs the Air Quality Act of 1967 into law in the East Room.
- November 22 – In a memorandum, President Johnson addresses the return of Small Business Administration representatives in procurement operations of several government agencies and states his hope for agency heads to "accept the challenge and make the coming fiscal year the best yet for small business in terms of proportionate share in dollar awards."
- November 22 – In a statement, President Johnson says "100 million Americans won a major victory" after the Senate passed a Social Security benefits bill and that the legislation "marks the greatest dollar increase – and one of the most sweeping improvements in the program – since President Roosevelt launched social security 32 years ago."
- November 24 – In a statement, President Johnson says H.R. 5784, 5787, and 5788 "authorize the sale of surplus materials – bismuth, molybdenum, and rare earths – no longer needed in our national stockpiles."
- November 24 – In a statement, President Johnson says H.R. 13048 will "make it possible for communities to buy and remodel existing buildings for use as libraries" and continue "the 100-percent Federal share for 1 additional year."
- November 27 – President Johnson transmits a copy of the multilateral trade agreement signed in Geneva on June 30, 1967, to Congress in a message.
- November 28 – President Johnson signs Executive Order 11382 which serves as an amendment to previous executive orders pertaining to the Department of Transportation.
- November 29 – In a statement, the White House says President Johnson "wants to compliment the magnificent efforts of NEED's founders as well as of the many hundreds of private organizations and individual citizens who have shared in this outpouring of human concern."
- November 29 – In a statement, President Johnson says he "could not justify asking Secretary McNamara indefinitely to continue to bear the enormous burdens of his position, nor could I in justice to him and to this Nation's obligations to the World Bank, refrain from recommending that he be selected as President of the Bank."
- November 29 – In a statement, President Johnson says Americans and Iranians "are pleased that the American AID mission that has long channeled much of America's economic assistance to Iran will close its doors tomorrow."
- November 30 – Howard J. Samuels is sworn in as Under Secretary of Commerce in the East Room.
- November 30 – President Johnson signs Executive Order 11383, ordering "that any income, excess-profits, estate, or gift tax return for the years 1948 to 1968, inclusive, shall, during the Ninetieth Congress, be open to inspection by the Senate Select Committee on Standards and Conduct, or any duly authorized subcommittee thereof, in connection with its investigation of allegations that members, officers, or employees of the Senate have engaged in improper conduct, violated the law, or violated the rules and regulations of the Senate in connection with the performance of their duties, pursuant to Senate Resolution 338, 88th Congress, agreed to July 24, 1964."

== December ==
- December 1 – In a statement after the death of Alan T. Waterman, President Johnson says the federal government has "lost a trusted counselor" and credits him with having "left an indelible stamp of achievement on one of the most vital areas of American life."
- December 1 – President Johnson signs Executive Order 11384, an amendment to section 2 of Executive Order 11248 that adds "(17) Director, United States Secret Service, Treasury Department."
- December 2 – President Johnson issues a statement on the death of Francis Spellman. Johnson reflects on Spellman's devotion to God as well as service to the United States and calls him a "good and gallant servant of our world".
- December 2 – President Johnson delivers remarks at the White House via closed-circuit television to a group of senior scientists gathered in Chicago to commemorate the twenty-fifth anniversary of the First Nuclear Reactor.
- December 2 – President Johnson delivers remarks by telephone while in the Cabinet Room to the Regional Democratic Conference held at Charleston, West Virginia, speaking highly of Vice President Humphrey as well as reporting on his recent activities and responding to a newspaper editor that criticized the seven years of Democrats controlling the White House.
- December 4 – President Johnson holds his one hundred and fifteenth news conference in the Cabinet Room. President Johnson begins the conference with an announcement of his intent to send the nomination of General Leonard Chapman to be the Commandant of the Marine Corps to the Senate as well as other nominations that are up and answers questions from reporters on the military budget for 1969, the resignation of Defense Secretary Robert McNamara, level of non-Vietnam spending, selection of Marine Corps commandant, the peace talks with North Vietnam, alternatives to tax increase, the possible visit of Prime Minister Wilson, the presidential candidacy of Eugene McCarthy, the Senate resolution on Vietnam, the replacement for Defense Secretary McNamara, the views of former President Dwight D. Eisenhower on Vietnam, meeting with Cyrus Vance, status of members of the cabinet, his campaign plans, steel price increase, and plans for an Asian summit meeting.
- December 4 – President Johnson addresses the Foreign Policy Conference for Business Executives in the Benjamin Franklin Room at the Department of State, speaking on American involvement with Vietnam and Asia.
- December 4 – President Johnson signs the Mental Retardation Amendments of 1967 in the East Room. President Johnson says the legislation is an achievement to the United States and "a signal of hope for millions of Americans and it is addressed to at least 2 million seriously retarded children."
- December 5 – In a statement, President Johnson says the meat inspection bill passed by Congress "will help guarantee to every American family that the meat on their table and in their stores and supermarkets will be safe and fit for human consumption."
- December 5 – President Johnson issues a statement on the observance of peace in Cyprus. He warns that "peace could not have been preserved without the good will of the governments concerned and their desire for peace or without the prompt and energetic action of the United Nations Secretary General and Security Council."
- December 5 – President Johnson signs the Partnership for Health Amendments of 1967 in the East Room. President Johnson notes the legislation as the thirty-first health bill he has signed during his tenure as president and says it contains a three-part strategy to help the Public Health Service fight against diseases.
- December 6 – President Johnson issues a statement of the death of President of Uruguay Oscar Gestido. He credits Gestido with having a "long record of public service to his country earned him a special place in the hearts of his fellow citizens."
- December 6 – President Johnson delivers remarks on international money problems, balance of payments, and expanding American exports to the Business Council at the Mayflower Hotel in Washington.
- December 6 – President Johnson issues a Proclamation 3821 to observe Wright Brothers Day on the upcoming December 17 "with appropriate ceremonies and activities, both to recall the accomplishments of the Wright brothers and to provide a stimulus to aviation in this country and throughout the world."
- December 7 – A recording of President Johnson addressing the importance of farming and achievements made since the formation of the National Advisory Commission on Food and Fiber is broadcast by the National Educational Television Network.
- December 8 – President Johnson delivers remarks at a White House briefing on the topic of civil programs in Vietnam in his White House office.
- December 8 – President Johnson signs H.R. 12910, establishing a Judge Advocate General's Corps in the Navy.
- December 8 – President Johnson vetoes H.R. 162, saying the legislation "could seriously endanger private financing for ship construction" and "could lead to far greater government subsidies for the merchant fleet – and place an undue and unnecessary financial burden on the American taxpayer."
- December 9 – An interview of President Johnson discussing his activities at the bachelors' dinner and his thoughts on the younger generation is broadcast.
- December 11 – President Johnson mentions that the Attorney General and FBI Director announced the local police departments report a 16-percent increase in crime during the first 9 months of 1967 and says the "increase underscores the urgency of my request 10 months ago for the most comprehensive anticrime legislation in the Nation's history: the Safe Streets and Crime Control Act."
- December 12 – In a statement accompanying his signing of S. 343, President Johnson says Senator Patrick McNamara "embodied the best of the American labor movement" and that it is correct for the Federal Office Building in Detroit to bear his name.
- December 12 – President Johnson delivers remarks at the Michoud Assembly Facility on the progress that has been made in the nine years since he first introduced the Aeronautics and Space Act of 1958.
- December 12 – President Johnson delivers remarks to the National Convention of the AFL-CIO and speaks on Republican efforts to stop bills on Medicare, poverty, education, civil rights, funds for model cities, and funding for housing and rent supplements.
- December 12 – President Johnson attends the dedication of Central Texas College in Killeen, Texas.
- December 12 – In a statement, President Johnson says the "Federal Government will cooperate fully with private enterprise and State and local government to transform these surplus and idle lands into new communities" and that the American people "want to see government and private enterprise join together to build decent homes for citizens who have never known their comfort, and to provide new training opportunities for those who want to improve their lives."
- December 13 – President Johnson delivers remarks at a press briefing by Colonel Daniel James, Jr. in the Cabinet Room.
- December 13 – President Johnson signs S. 1085, an amendment of the Federal Credit Union Act of 1934, in the Cabinet Room. President Johnson says the legislation eases lending and pay dividends are twice as often.
- December 14 – President Johnson delivers remarks at the Museum of History and Technology of the Smithsonian Institution commemorating the 200th Anniversary of the Encyclopædia Britannica.
- December 14 – President Johnson signs S. 1003 in the East Room. The legislation is an amendment to U.S. Flammable Fabrics Act.
- December 14 – President Johnson attends the presentation of President Andrew Johnson in the Cabinet Room.
- December 15 – President Johnson signs H.R. 12144 into law in the East Room. The legislation is an amendment to the Federal Meat Inspection Act and is said by President Johnson to include giving the state two years "to develop a meat inspection program that is equally as good as" that of the Federal Government, offering "the States Federal help to set up those inspection systems", raising "the quality standards for all imported meats", and giving "the Secretary of Agriculture – for the first time – the power to inspect State plants."
- December 15 – In a statement, President Johnson announces the federal government is becoming involved in trying to assist the New Haven Railroad in running and that they are acting on behalf of "40,000 commuters who use it daily to get to their jobs" and "5 million people for whom the New Haven provides the only available railway service."
- December 15 – President Johnson issues a statement on the retirement of Prime Minister of Canada Lester Pearson.
- December 15 – President Johnson attends the lighting of the United States Christmas Tree at the 14th annual Pageant of Peace ceremonies on the Ellipse near the White House.
- December 16 – President Johnson signs H.R. 480, a bill extending "authority to appropriate up to $105 million for the acquisition of land for migratory waterfowl refuges" by eight years.
- December 16 – In a statement, President Johnson says the Age Discrimination in Employment Act of 1967 "gives the vital part of our labor force between 40 and 65 a better chance to go on working productively and gainfully. The country will gain as well from making better use of their skills and experience."
- December 16 – President Johnson issues a Christmas message to service members on sacrifices made by service members in the centuries and decades preceding them.
- December 16 – President Johnson signs H.R. 7977 and H.R. 13510 into law which he says "have given a 15.2 percent increase to Federal workers and an 18.1 percent raise to postal workers" and "have been among the proudest moments of my Presidency."
- December 16 – President Johnson signs the Kennedy Round Trade Negotiations Proclamation in the Cabinet Room. Johnson says the negotiations have "a very special significance for our relations with Western Europe because for the first time we negotiated directly with the European Common Market as an institution."
- December 16 – President Johnson signs Executive Order 11385, adding "(6) Deputy Administrator, Federal Highway Administration, Department of Transportation" to Level IV of the Federal Executive Salary Schedule.
- December 16 – President Johnson signs Proclamation 3822, carrying out the Geneva protocol for agreements on trade, tariffs, and other shared arrangements between countries.
- December 18 – President Johnson issues a statement on the death of Prime Minister of Australia Harold Holt. President Johnson says Holt "fought with rare courage, tenacity, and vision to assure that men would live safe from peril in the promise of freedom" and "was generous with the gift of a warm and wise heart."
- December 18 – President Johnson participates in an interview with the Australian Broadcasting Company on his relationship with Prime Minister Holt, his recollections of his first impression of Holt, and if there was one special event that he would remember Holt by.
- December 18 – In a statement, President Johnson says the United States "has been saddened by the Silver Bridge tragedy and I express deepest sympathy to you and through you to the stricken families and the people of West Virginia and Ohio."
- December 19 – In a statement, President Johnson expresses satisfaction with the ratifying on Agreement on the Rescue of Astronauts, the Return of Astronauts and the Return of Objects Launched into Outer Space and says the agreement "will help to ensure that nations will assist astronauts in the event of accident or emergency" and "would carry forward the purpose of this administration to promote international cooperation in the peaceful uses of outer space."
- December 19 – President Johnson signs H.J. Res. 888 into law which he credits with carrying out his request "to the Congress that I be authorized and directed to cut Government spending this year by some $4.3 billion – $2.5 billion over and above the expenditure reductions already made by the Congress", "requires every civilian agency to reduce its budgeted obligations by an amount equal to a percent of payroll, plus 10 percent of other controllable obligations", and "provides for a reduction in the obligations of the Defense Department by an amount equal to 10 percent of non-Vietnam programs."
- December 19 – President Johnson delivers remarks at the Honolulu International Airport on relations between the United States and Australia and Harold Holt's vision of Asia.
- December 19 – President Johnson signs S. 814 into law, establishing the National Park Foundation. President Johnson says the legislation "provides a simple and direct way for individual Americans and corporations to forward the work of conservation."
- December 19 – An interview of President Johnson is aired in which he answers questions about new ideas regarding the Vietnam War, a growing impression throughout the world that the United States will not settle for anything in Vietnam other than a military victory, if the United States was willing to "accept Communists in a coalition government", if he believes the United States has made its proposition and that others are left to react, Hanoi's attitude at that point in the war, negotiations pertaining to parties outside of the United States, the lack of contributions to the war on the part of the South Vietnam forces, and why the Russians continue arming North Vietnam if they are committed to peace.
- December 19 – In a memorandum, President Johnson states that he is vetoing H.R. 1670 on the grounds that the Congressional Committees did not assert that Dr. George H. Edler was self-employed and that he did not "identify anything in the record which would distinguish Dr. Edler's case from these others."
- December 20 – President Johnson signs H.R. 6111, establishing the Federal Judicial Center and in doing so giving the United States its first "instrument to assure an efficient, smooth-running judiciary – a system equal to the modern and changing society it must serve."
- December 20 – President Johnson delivers remarks at Tafuna International Airport directed toward Governor of American Samoa Owen S. Aspinall.
- December 20 – In a statement, President Johnson notes the collapse of the Ohio River bridge and announces he is "establishing a task force, chaired by the Secretary of Transportation, to begin immediately an intensive study of the Ohio River bridge tragedy and to conduct a national survey of bridge safety."
- December 21 – President Johnson meets with President of the Republic of Vietnam Nguyễn Văn Thiệu for an informal working dinner for "a full exchange of views on all aspects of South Vietnam's struggle to defend its freedom from external force" and congratulates Thiệu "on the completion of a constitution, the holding of successful national elections, and the installation of a constitutional government."
- December 21 – President Johnson meets with President of South Korea Park Chung-hee in which Pak described "the agent and sabotage activities being conducted against his country by the regime in North Korea, and the measures being taken to ensure that this threat continued to be dealt with effectively" and the two "exchanged views on all aspects of the Vietnam situation, reaffirming their respective policies of strong and unswerving support for the independence of South Vietnam and the freedom of its people to determine their future without external interference."
- December 21 – President Johnson delivers remarks at Fairbairn Royal Australian Air Force Base on his intent to "pay my personal respects to a man who was my cherished friend and who led a nation which is the trusted friend of the United States."
- December 21 – President Johnson meets with Prime Minister of Australia John McEwen "to exchange views on a range of current matters."
- December 23 – In a statement, President Johnson says he met with Pope Paul VI to call on him in keeping with the latter's call for "unarmed cooperation ... towards the reestablishment of true peace" and the possibility of peace in Paris by noting failed efforts in the past.
- December 23 – President Johnson signs S. 1785 into law, an increase of benefits for service members in hazardous duty posts that allows them to rejoin their families twice a year, provides a year of convalescent leave to those injured that will not be charged on sick leave or their annual, and provides free transportation home in the event of a family emergency.
- December 23 – Karachi, Pakistan issues a joint statement on the meeting between President Johnson and President Ayub in which the two discussed "Pakistan's additional needs of wheat and vegetable oils and agreed to ask a staff study to be made available at an early date" and Johnson congratulating Ayub "on Pakistan's continuing progress, and especially for the success of Pakistan in introducing new wheat strains, expanding human consumption of maize, and expanding both irrigation and chemical fertilizer application."
- December 23 – President Johnson delivers remarks to Senior Unit Commanders on their objective of peace and the determination of the United States forces to not yield after setting their course in Cam Ranh Bay, Vietnam.
- December 23 – President Johnson delivers remarks to service personnel and award of distinguished service medal and medal of freedom to military and civilian leaders in Cam Ranh Bay, Republic of Vietnam.
- December 23 – President Johnson delivers remarks to American combat pilots of the 388th Tactical Fighter Wing at the Royal Thai Air Force Base in Khorat, Thailand.
- December 24 – A message from President Johnson detailing the contents of his global trip is nationally broadcast.
- December 27 – President Johnson signs H.R. 10964 into law. President Johnson says the legislation enables senior citizens residing in Washington to be eligible for "hospital benefits under Medicare for treatment in publicly-owned hospitals and health facilities."
- December 27 – President Johnson signs the District of Columbia Crime Bill into law. President Johnson notes his discontent with a crime bill for the District of Columbia the previous year and notes his disagreement with a provision requiring minimum sentence requirements which he says "are a backward step in modern correctional policy" which serve to deprive judges "of the discretion-traditional in our system of law – to fix sentences on the basis of an individual's record and character."
