= Milk equivalent =

Measure of milk content in dairy products in the US

Milk equivalent is a measure of the quantity of fluid milk used in a processed dairy product. Measured on a milkfat basis, it takes about 21.8 pounds of farm milk to make a pound of butter, and about 9.2 pounds to make a pound of American cheese. Measured on a skim solids basis, it takes about 11.6 pounds of farm milk to make a pound of nonfat dry milk. Farm milk weighs about 8.6 pounds per gallon.
