= Timeline of the Richard Nixon presidency (1970) =

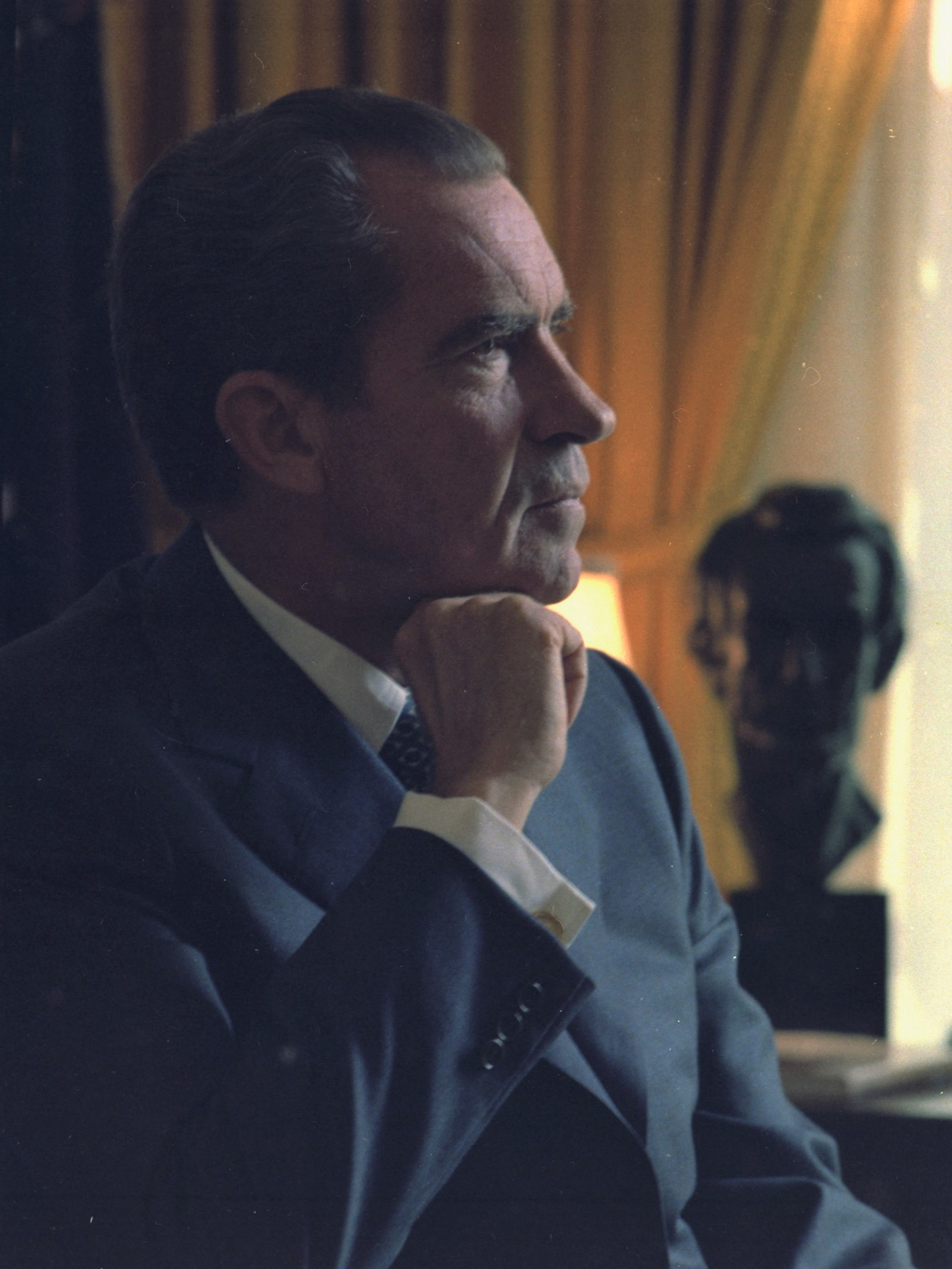
Nixon in 1970

The following is a timeline of the presidency of Richard Nixon from January 1, 1970, to December 31, 1970.

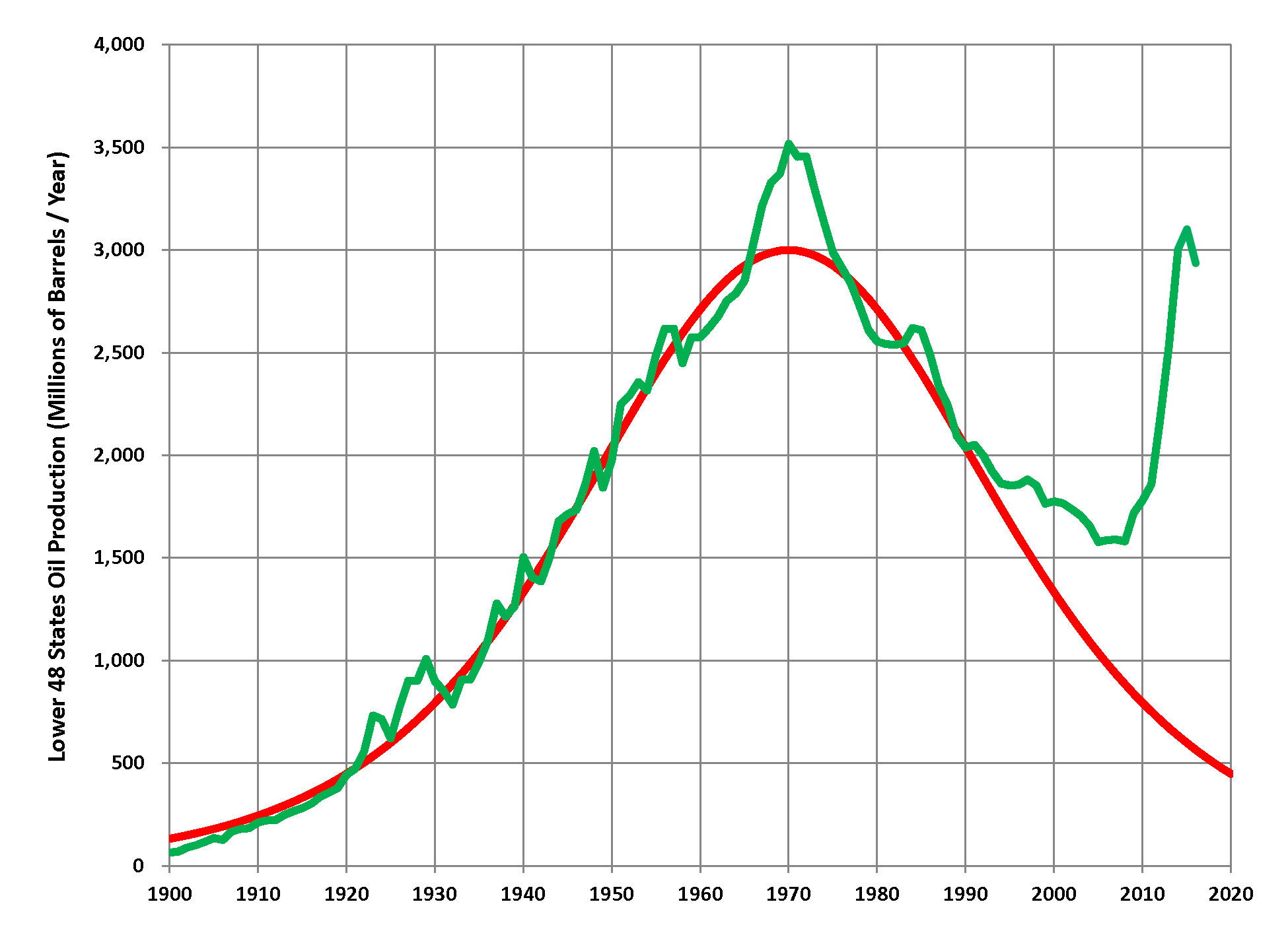
US Oil Production peaks in 1970.

== January ==
- January 1 – President Nixon signs the National Environmental Policy Act.
- January 3 – Vice President Spiro Agnew says the US is warning other countries about treaty obligations made in Asia and that his country intends to follow its pledge while speaking to newsmen. President Nixon finishes the fiscal 1971 federal budget and meets with Budget Director Robert P. Mayo.
- January 4 – Vice President Agnew meets with Prime Minister of Thailand Thanom Kittikachorn in Thailand.
- January 8 – The State Department announces the US and China are going to resume ambassadorial-level meetings the upcoming January 20.
- January 9 – A gathering of over 200 protestors outside the White House cancels a birthday celebration for President Nixon.
- January 10 – United States Secretary of Labor George P. Shultz tells newsmen that labor department studies over the course of 1963, 1965, and 1969 as support for his theory that major strikes are not as economically harmful as believed.
- January 11 – The White House announces the intent of President Nixon to assist with relief efforts towards Biafrans.
- January 12 – President Nixon's appointment of Jerome H. Holland for United States Ambassador to Sweden is announced.
- January 14 – The State Department discloses that General Yakubu Gowon has praised American relief efforts within his country. The White House announces President Nixon's ordering of additional cuts in the 1971 budget in an effort to prevent inflation.
- January 15 – The White House announces the negotiation of future airport construction being the result of an agreement between the state government and respective county in southern Florida. Secretary of Defense Laird announces the reduction of American military strength by 300,000 troops by the following June while speaking to the California State Chamber of Commerce.
- January 16 – Press Secretary Ronald Ziegler says the tight fiscal policies of the Nixon administration will continue into the fiscal policy for the following year.
- January 17 – Vice President Agnew tells newsmen that he conveyed the Nixon doctrine within Asia during his trip. Secretary of State Rogers says he wishes for impeding discussions between the US and Red China will ease relations for exchanges of both visitors and trades during an interview.
- January 18 – United States Attorney General John Mitchell announces 236 million dollars will be used by the law enforcement administration to provide grants to states and cities in the year's fiscal budget. Vice President Agnew holds a breakfast meeting with United States Forces in Pacific Commander in Chief John S. McCain, Jr. at the Kahala Hilton hotel in Honolulu.
- January 19 – Press Secretary Ziegler announces President Nixon's nomination of G. Harrold Carswell for the United States Supreme Court.
- January 20 – The Senate votes 74 to 17 in favor of a 19.7 billion dollar money bill for the Labor and Health, Education, and Welfare Departments. Secretary of Labor Shultz announces his support for a Chicago, Illinois program to assist in increasing black employment.
- January 22 – President Nixon delivers the 1970 State of the Union Address to a joint session of Congress.
- January 23 – The Senate votes 73 to 1 in favor of an anti-crime bill promoted by the Nixon administration that incorporates Nixon's policies on handcuffing crime.
- January 25 – A message by President Nixon, in which the latter states the US would supply Israel with arms when growing concerns continue, is read during a Jewish conference.
- January 26 – President Nixon vetoes the Senate approved 19.7 billion dollar money bill during a televised appearance in the evening.
- January 27 – President Nixon meets with Prime Minister of Britain Harold Wilson at the White House.
- January 28 – The House sustains President Nixon's veto of the money bill.
- January 29 – The Nixon administration dismisses the possibility of a resuming of American bombing on North Vietnam as a result of the American fighter bombers attacking a base of communist anti-aircraft affiliation.
- January 30 – Vice President Agnew declares he will no longer critique television broadcasters and rebukes Baltimore newspapers during a testimonial to newsmen in Essex, Maryland.
- January 31 – Press Secretary Ziegler denies President Nixon was involved with the installation of a helicopter landing pad in Key Biscayne.

== February ==
- February 1 – Vice President Agnew discloses an upcoming formation of a cabinet group to address desegregation court orders on southern school districts during an appearance on Face the Nation.
- February 2 – President Nixon's federal budget for 1971 is released to Congress.
- February 3 – Vice President Agnew denounces charges against the Nixon administration of promoting euphoria on Vietnam while speaking to newsmen. President Nixon sends a letter to Speaker John McCormack calling on Congress to compromise with him by composing an appropriation bill for health and education.
- February 4 – President Nixon issues an executive order demanding federal facilities cease the usage of air and water polluting operations within the next three years.
- February 5 – President Nixon holds a meeting with city mayors discussing law enforcement and the usage of federal and local authorities in combatting crime.

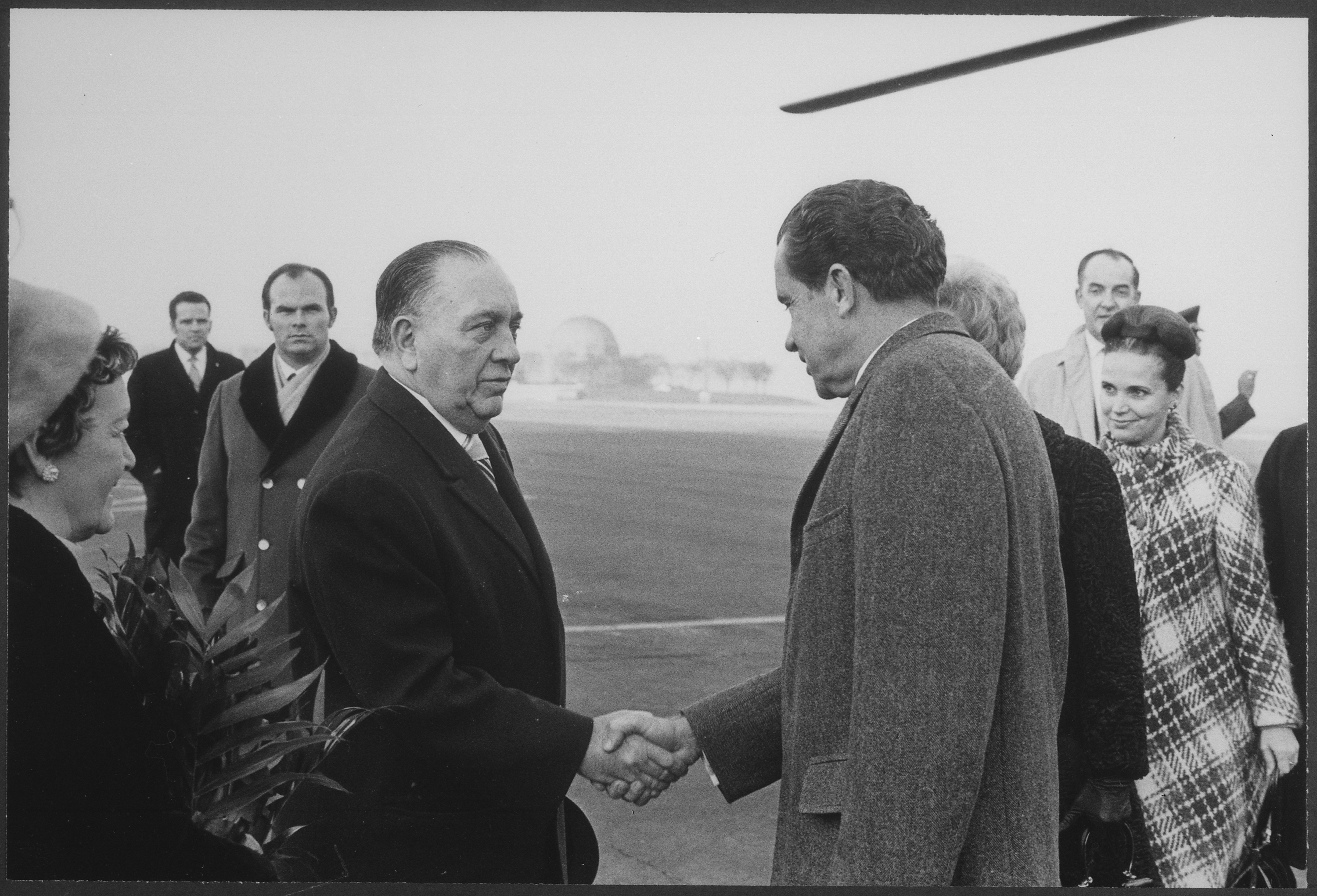
Nixon shakes hands with Mayor of Chicago Richard Daley, February 6, 1970

- February 6 – United States Secretary of Housing and Urban Development George Romney says President Nixon's visit to the Midwest was successful in creating a bond between his administration and officials on a state and local level.
- February 8 – United States Secretary of the Treasury David M. Kennedy predicts a decline in price increase rate will occur within the latter part of the year.
- February 9 – Vice President Agnew denounces the claims of Congressional Democrats in a broadcast the previous day as "pure unadulterated fable".
- February 10 – United States Attorney General John Mitchell states an unspecified airport has been taken over by organized crime during a speech to the Bonds club in New York City.
- February 23 – United States Secretary of Labor George P. Shultz delivers a message from President Nixon to labor leaders and holds a meeting with them in which he says President Nixon describes himself as an activist President. The Senate votes for the authorization of full payment for the providing of free lunches to needy schoolchildren. Press Secretary Ziegler says President Nixon is looking forward to discussions with President of France Georges Pompidou.

== March ==
- March 2 – President Nixon attends a dinner honoring French President Pompidou at the Waldorf-Astoria in New York City during the evening.
- March 3 – President Nixon submits a special message to Congress calling for education reform. President Nixon issues Executive Order 11513, establishing the President's Commission on School Finance.
- March 4 – President Nixon transmits to Congress the annual report on the Foreign Assistance Program.
- March 5 – President Nixon signs Executive Order 11514 into law. President Nixon delivers an address at a ceremony following signing the treaty on the non-proliferation of nuclear weapons in the International Conference Room at the Department of State during the morning.

== April ==
- April 1 – President Nixon denounces charges of racism against Carswell and accuses the opposition of trying to stop the nomination so they can fill the vacancy on the court with individuals sharing their same ideology.
- April 2 – Labor Secretary Shultz admits to seeing no solution in the dispute between railroad and shopcraft unions other than the enactment of a compulsory solution.
- April 3 – President Nixon sends a special message to Congress requesting the first class postage rate be increased to 10 cents per letter as part of a pledge to increase postal worker wages by 14%.

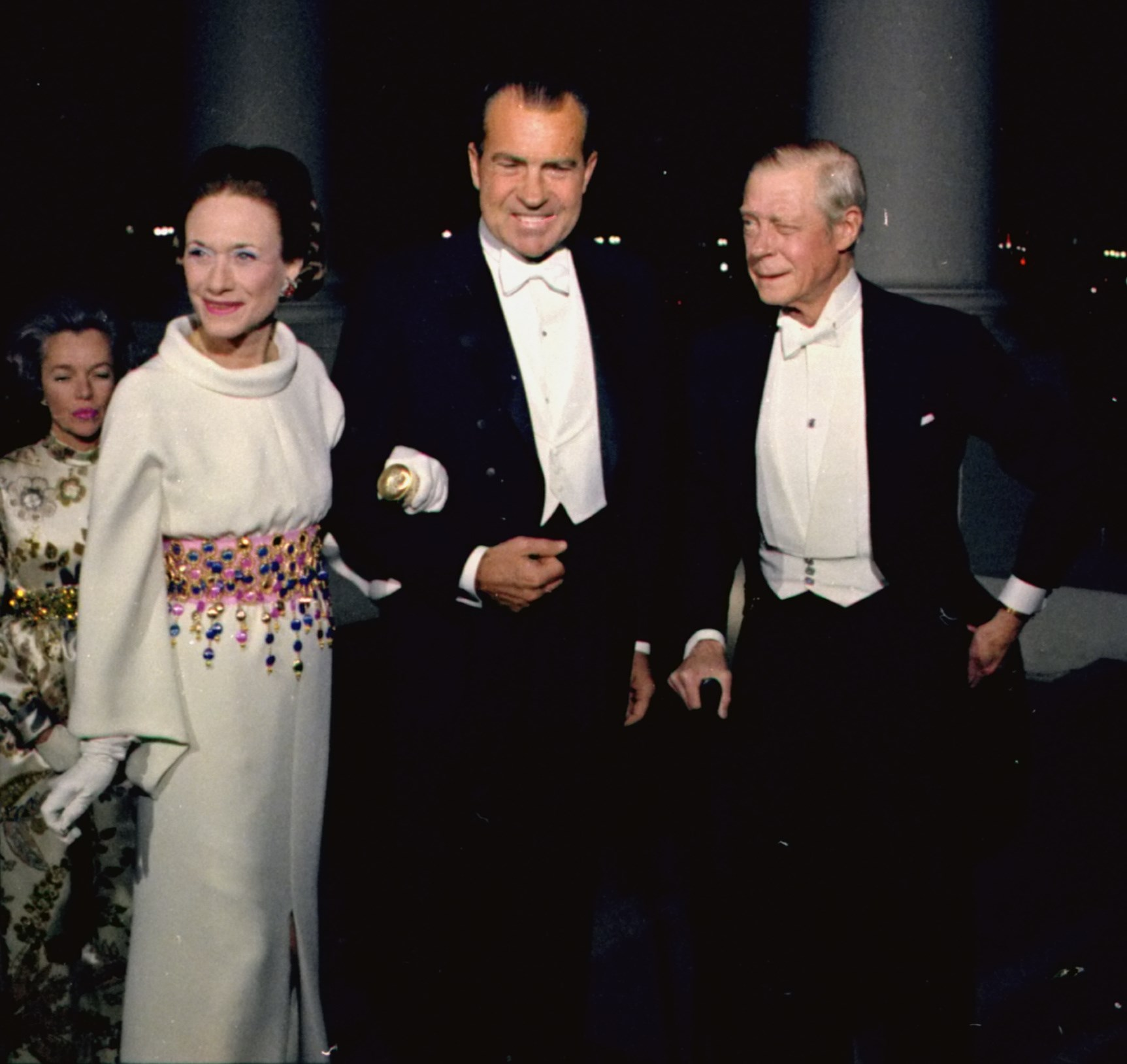
Nixon and the Duchess and Duke of Windsor, April 4, 1970

- April 4 – President Nixon attends a party for the Duchess of Windsor Wallis Simpson and Duke Edward VIII.
- April 5 – President Nixon attends a sermon of worship for John Cardinal Krol at the White House.
- April 7 – United States Secretary of Health, Education, and Welfare Robert H. Finch says the intent of the Nixon administration is to aim for desegregating faculty during a press conference. President Nixon presents the Medal of Honor to the families of twenty-one soldiers killed in the Vietnam War during a ceremony in the East Room.
- April 8 – The Senate votes 51 to 45 in disapproval of the nomination of G. Harrold Carswell to the Supreme Court.
- April 9 – President Nixon announces the next judge he nominates for the Supreme Court will not hail from the Southern United States and the next nomination would be soon.
- April 10–11 – President Nixon meets with Chancellor of Germany Willy Brandt for discussions in Washington.
- April 13 – President Nixon signs into law a bill authorizing over 24 billion dollars for both elementary and secondary education over the following three years.
- April 14 – President Nixon announces his nomination of Harry A. Blackmun for Associate Justice of the Supreme Court.
- April 15 – President Nixon requests Congress authorize a ban of dumping polluted materials in the Great Lakes. The White House announces a postponing of President Nixon's national televised address on the Vietnam War scheduled for the following day to during the early part of the upcoming week.
- April 16 – The House votes 243 to 155 in favor of President Nixon's welfare reform bill.
- April 17 – President Nixon announces that he will fly to Hawaii to present the crew of Apollo 13 with the Medal of Freedom.
- April 18 – President Nixon presents the Apollo 13 crew with Medals of Freedom at the Honolulu International Airport.
- April 20 – President Nixon announces the withdrawal of 150,000 troops from Vietnam by the following spring during a televised national address.
- April 28 – The Defense Department reports on the launch of Red China's first earthquake orbiting satellite.
- April 29 – The Cambodian Campaign is launched, a series of military operations conducted in eastern Cambodia by the United States and South Vietnam.

== June ==
- June 16 – President Nixon addresses the nation on live television to outline his plan for combating inflation

== July ==
- July 4 – President Nixon holds a meeting with David K. E. Bruce during the morning and afternoon discussing diplomacy. American officials confirm a meeting between President of the Republic of Vietnam Nguyễn Văn Thiệu and Secretary of State Rogers failed to produce a joint peace resolution to introduce at the Paris talks.
- July 9 – President Nixon sends a message to Congress recommending adoption of Reorganization Plans Nos. 3 and 4. Reorganization Plan No. 3 would create the Environmental Protection Agency (EPA). Reorganization Plan No. 4 would create the National Oceanic and Atmospheric Administration (NOAA) within the Department of Commerce.

== October ==
- October 1 – President Nixon holds a six-hour meeting with President of Yugoslavia Josip Broz Tito in Belgrade, Yugoslavia. President Nixon states his interest in learning about Yugoslavia during remarks at the Serbian Council Building in Belgrade during the evening.
- October 2 – President Nixon delivers an address at Barajas Airport and receives the key to the city of Madrid during the afternoon.
- October 3 – President Nixon gives a speech on leaving Spain as well as both the historic and personal value of traveling there at the Barajas Airport during the morning.
- October 4 – President Nixon meets with David Bruce and Philip Habib during the Paris peace talks.
- October 5 – President Nixon comments that he believes his trip to Europe has greatly aided in securing a generation of peace. President Nixon visits the graves of his ancestors during a ceremony in Dublin, Ireland.
- October 6 – President Nixon announces his intention to announce a new peace plan for ending the Vietnam War during a televised address scheduled for the following day and says the remarks will be his most comprehensive discussion of Southeast Asia while meeting with reporters. The White House announces President Nixon's address to the United Nations General Assembly on October 23.
- October 8 – President Nixon said opposition to his Vietnam peace plan by domestic politicians has aided the hopes of North Vietnamese leaders while in Savannah, Georgia.
- October 14 – The White House announces President Nixon will spend two days giving speeches and attending rallies in Ohio, North Dakota, Missouri, Tennessee, and Indiana in aid of Republican candidates for the midterm elections in two and half weeks.
- October 15 – President Nixon signs the Organized Crime Control Act into law.
- October 16 – Secretary of State Rogers holds a four-hour conference with Soviet Union Minister of Foreign Affairs Andrei Gromyko.
- October 19 – Vice President Agnew endorses the reelection bid of Senator Ralph Smith during an evening speech in Chicago, Illinois.
- October 20 – President Nixon offers an endorsement of Congressman Richard L. Roudebush for the United States Senate during an appearance in Fort Wayne, Indiana in the evening.

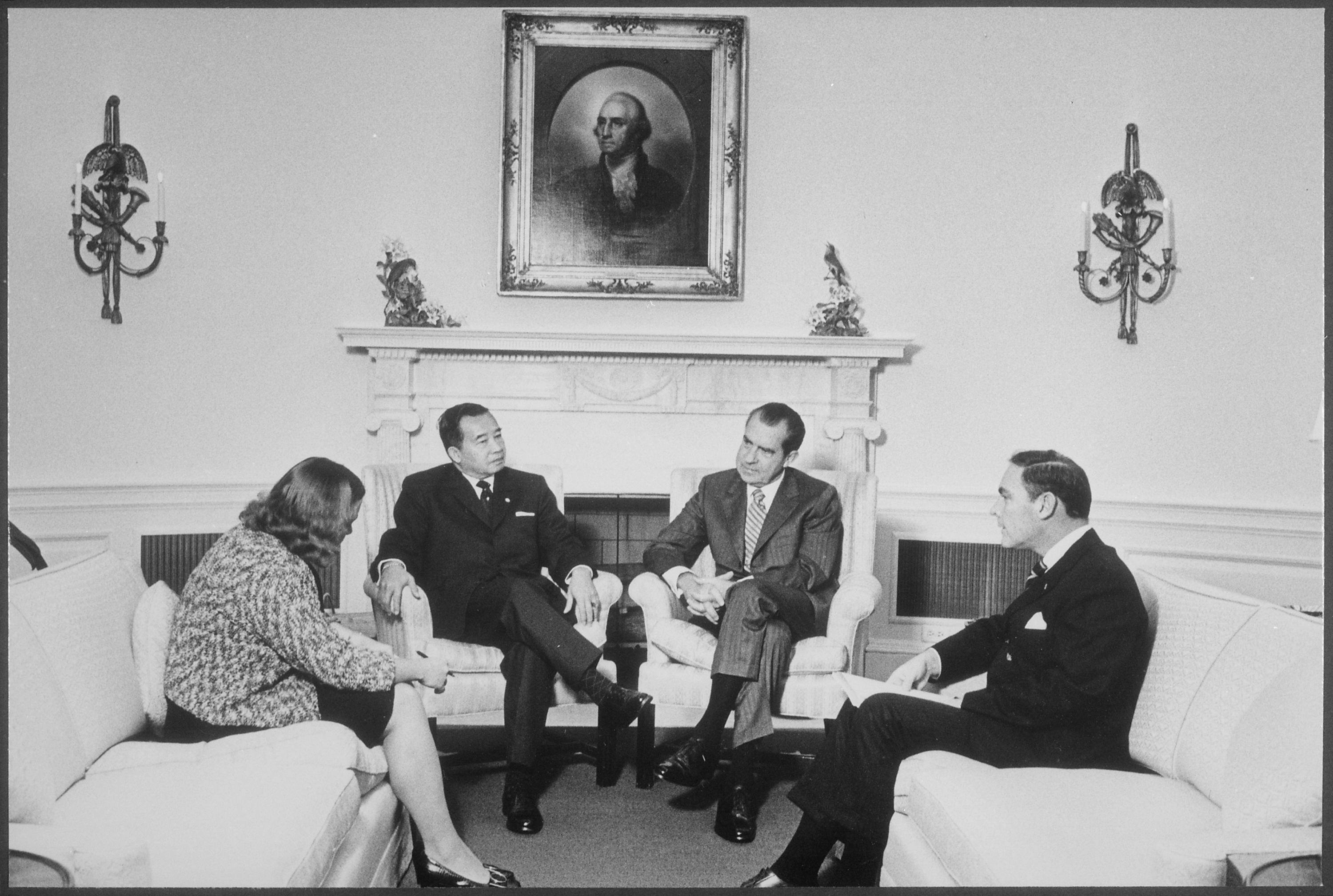
Nixon meets Prime Minister of Laos Souvanna Phouma in the Oval Office, October 21, 1970

- October 22 – President Nixon meets with Soviet Union Minister of Foreign Affairs Gromyko at the White House for a wide-ranging discussion.
- October 23 – President Nixon delivers an address calling for peace with the Soviet Union to the 25th commemorative session of the United Nations General Assembly.
- October 26 – Vice President Agnew pledges the Nixon administration will appoint a southerner to the Supreme Court, support the south against neighborhood schools, and protect the textile nature of the part of the US while in Raleigh, North Carolina.
- October 28 – President Nixon delivers an address at the Market Hall Convention Center in Dallas, Texas during the evening.
- October 29 – President Nixon speaks briefly at the Mayo Civic Auditorium in Rochester, Minnesota during the afternoon.
- October 30 – President Nixon issues Proclamation 4020, designating the upcoming November 25 as "World Law Day".
- October 31 – President Nixon gives a speech on crime and violence at the Sky Harbor Airport in Phoenix, Arizona during the morning.

== November ==
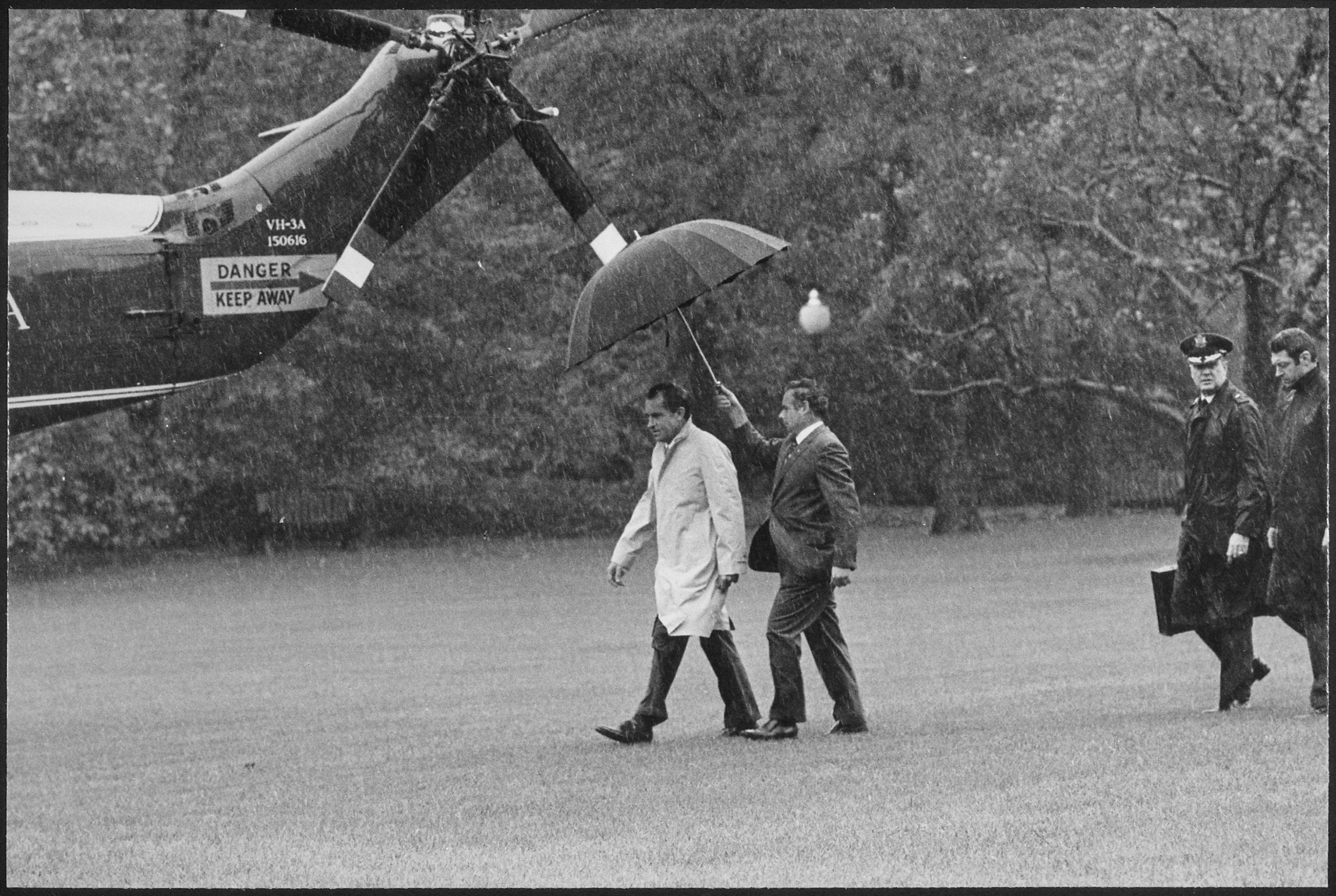
Nixon walking out to Marine One in the rain, November 1, 1970

- November 1 – Vice President Agnew condemns Democrats for lying as the presidential election approaches.
- November 4 – President Nixon states his pleasure with the new Republican majority in the Senate while speaking to reporters.
- November 6 – President Nixon announces his appointing of William D. Ruckelshaus for Administrator of the Environmental Protection Agency.
- November 8 – President Nixon meets with Conservative Party leaders Kieran O'Doherty and J. Daniel Mahoney and William F. Buckley, Jr. in Grand Cay Island.
- November 10 – The White House announces President Nixon will pay a call to French President Pompidou amid his overnight stay in Paris.
- November 12 – President Nixon holds his first meeting with Nikolai Podgorny and French President Pompidou.
- November 13 – President Nixon meets with President-elect of Mexico Luis Echeverría for a discussion on problems mutually impacting the US and Mexico.
- November 17 – President Nixon delivers a speech at Pennsylvania Academy of the Fine Arts in Philadelphia, Pennsylvania during the evening.
- November 20 – President Nixon meets with Chairman of the Federal Reserve Board Arthur Burns.
- November 21 – Defense Secretary Laird denies reports by Radio Hanoi of a prisoner of war camp being hit as well as American flies being wounded earlier in the south panhandle of North Vietnam.
- November 23 – Defense Secretary Laird discloses details on a volunteer force around Hanoi. President Nixon's veto on a spending limiting bill on candidates running for office attempting to use radio and television in a vote of 58 to 34.
- November 24 – Defense Secretary Laird declares retribution will be conducted in the event of American prisoners of war being punished by the North Vietnamese after a raid on a prisoner compound. President Nixon issues Executive Order 11569, implemented for imposing regulations on the Selective Service. President Nixon delivers an endorsement of James Oates heading the Jobs for Veterans Program in the Briefing Room of the White House during the morning.
- November 30 – President Nixon orders an investigation into a Lithuanian seaman returning to Russian authorities after an unsuccessful attempt at defecting to an American Coast Guard during the previous week.

== December ==
- December 1 – National Security Advisor Kissinger is learned to have been the subject of an antiwar kidnapping plot.
- December 2 – The Senate votes 77 to 0 in favor of prohibition commercial airplanes from flying at super speeds over the US alongside the implementations of noise restrictions.
- December 3 – Secretary of State Rogers delivers a pledge by President Nixon to not reduce American troops in the European continent until East European Communists agree to do so for their own soldiers first.
- December 4 – President Nixon pledges an increase in the supply of crude oil in an attempt to curb gas and oil price increases during a speech in New York.
- December 5 – President Nixon criticizes members of the Senate for their scuffling over the supersonic transport airplane.
- December 8 – President Nixon issues Executive Order 11571, designating "the Commissioner of the District of Columbia as the Authority to carry out the provisions of" the District of Columbia Alley Dwelling Act.
- December 9 – President Nixon announces the resignation of White House counselor Bryce Harlow.
- December 10 – Secretary of State Rogers says the Nixon administration is not intending to send American troops into Cambodia while speaking to the Senate Foreign Relations Committee. President Nixon announces that he will order an air bombing of North Vietnam strategic targets in the event that the Hanoi government build a military buildup in South Vietnam and threatens American troops there. President Nixon announces the appointing of Donald Rumsfeld for presidential counselor during a press conference.
- December 11 – Vice President Agnew's aides confirm his intention to attend the Republican Governors' Conference in Sun Valley, Idaho.
- December 13 – President Nixon calls on the Senate to use the last few days of the current session to enact the Family Assistance Plan during a speech at the White House Conference on Children. Defense Secretary Laird says prisoners of American nationality in North Vietnam must be released before the completion of Vietnamizaton of the war.
- December 14 – President Nixon announces the resignation of David Kennedy as Treasury Secretary. Vice President Agnew says Democrats in Congress are anticipated to work with President Nixon in solving economic issues within the US during the evening.
- December 16 – President Nixon threatens causing a special meeting if Congress adjourns without address issues he dubs as vital legislation.
- December 18 – The State Department states Americans should avoid traveling to Poland as a result of recent disturbances.
- December 21 – The Senate votes 48 to 35 in favor of sustaining President Nixon's veto of the Employment and Manpower bill.
- December 22 – President Nixon signs the Department of Agriculture and Related Agencies Appropriation Act and signs Proclamation 4025, a revision effecting imports.
- December 23 – President Nixon issues Executive Order 11574, establishing a new water pollution control permit program pursuant to the Refuse Act, the Federal Water Pollution Control Act and related laws.
- December 24 – President Nixon releases a Christmas Eve statement calling for peace.
- December 29 – Congress sends a 6.66 billion defense appropriation bill to President Nixon after the House and Senate votes in favor of it.
- December 30 – President Nixon has his annual physical examination at Bethesda Naval Hospital. Deputy Defense Secretary David Packard suggests Lockheed Aircraft Corporation concede a 200 million loss on the contract proposing the construction of C-5A cargo plane in an attempt to avoid bankruptcy.
- December 31 – President Nixon signs the Clean Air Act of 1970.
