= Timeline of the Lyndon B. Johnson presidency (1968–1969) =

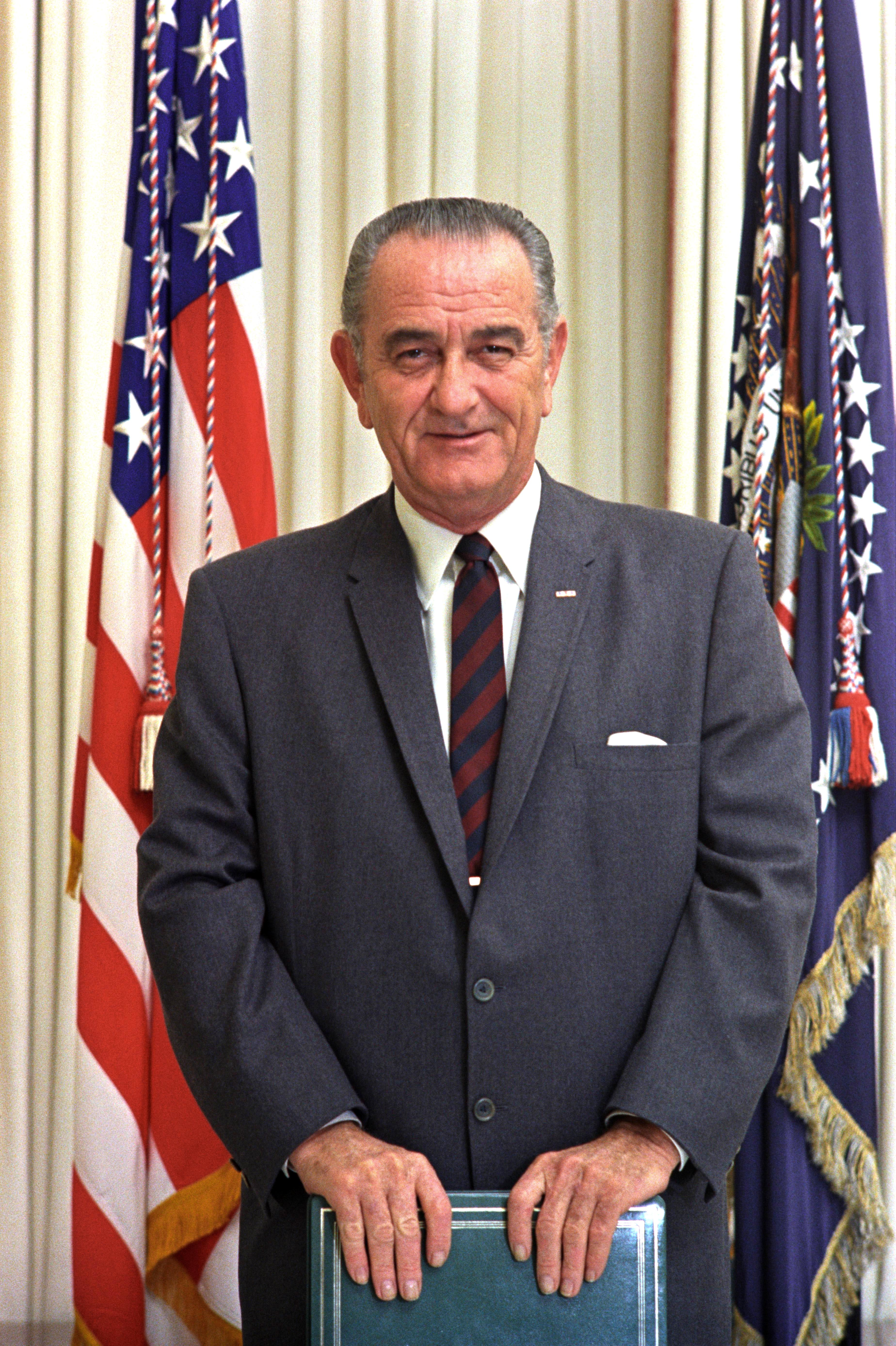
Johnson in January 1969

The following is a timeline of the presidency of Lyndon B. Johnson from January 1, 1968, to January 20, 1969.

== January ==
- January 1 – President Johnson makes an announcement about his intent to ask for Congress to restrict travel by Americans due to a crash program meant to reduce the payment deficit balance. During a press conference at his ranch, Johnson says he cannot predict peace for the Vietnam War this year, as ongoing investigations are being done into the statements alleged to have been made by Norodom Sihanouk that suggest the latter is interested in having friendly relations with the United States.
- January 2 – President Johnson selects Arthur Okun for chair of his economic advisors council. President Johnson also announces the appointment of 18 individuals to serve as members of a federal commission dedicated to pornography and obscenity. President Johnson signs a Social Security bill imposing larger benefit checks to 24 million people beginning in two months during the night. Johnson claims that a million Americans will be lifted above the poverty line with the legislation.
- January 3 – American planes resume bombing Hanoi, reporting the shooting down of two MIGs over the North Vietnamese capital.
- January 4 – Officials state that President Johnson's plan to slow down the U.S. gold outflow will have contributions made by Germany and Italy.
- January 5 – Vice President Humphrey affirms the support the US has for Africa in its battle for self-governing and prosperity during a short visit to Zambia.
- January 6 – The White House confirms President Johnson's health as being fine after a worldwide trip.
- January 7 – President Johnson meets with Prime Minister of Israel Levi Eshkol at the LBJ Ranch for the beginning of two days' worth of discussions on problems in the Middle East. Senators Charles Percy and Eugene McCarthy appear separately on television with the message of calling on President Johnson to cease bombing in Vietnam.
- January 11 – General Lawrence F. O'Brien says he would be fine with running as a stand in for President Johnson in the Democratic primary in Massachusetts.
- January 13 – President Johnson announces his choice of Angler Biddle Duke to United States Chief of Protocol.
- January 15 – President Johnson speaks with Secretary of the Treasury Henry H. Fowler about the possibility of a 10% income tax surcharge. Alf Landon criticizes President Johnson's Vietnam policy for the plight of the US dollar and the continued disorder across America while speaking to a Rotary club audience.
- January 16 – Citing a disillusion by Americans of "government by mystery", Governor of California Ronald Reagan tells 6,000 Republicans at a fundraising dinner that any Republican could defeat LBJ in the presidential election while speaking for 45 minutes.
- January 17 – President Johnson delivers the 1968 State of the Union Address to a joint session of Congress.
- January 18 – During an appearance at the White House and with First Lady Lady Bird Johnson present, singer Eartha Kitt says of LBJ's Vietnam policy: "You send the best of this country off to be shot and maimed. No wonder the kids rebel and take pot."
- January 19 – President Johnson meets with United States Secretary of Defense Robert McNamara for discussions on matters concerning the Defense Department during the morning. President Johnson holds his one hundredth and seventeenth news conference in his White House office during the afternoon. President Johnson addresses the Advisory Committee on Youth Activities of the Democratic National Committee in the Fish Room of the White House during the afternoon.
- January 20 – President Johnson announces a Washington-based pilot project for a housing and medical center for the low income elderly and expresses hope that it will become a model across the US.
- January 21 – Protestors of the Vietnam War are ejected from President Johnson's church in Washington while he is not present.
- January 22 – President Johnson transmits the third annual report of the International Coffee Agreement in a message to Congress per requirement of P.L. 89-23.
- January 23 – President Johnson sends Congress a 2.1 billion manpower proposal in his first special message of the year. The proposal features a plan to combat unemployment in the fifteen largest American cities.
- January 24 – President Johnson sends a message to Congress outlining his views on how civil rights should be adopted in the country's policies and living standards as well as calling for both chambers to become involved with the process by "adopting this legislation fundamental to the human rights and dignity of every American."
- January 25 – President Johnson orders the immediate active duty of 14,787 reservists to strengthen the US's abroad involvement in the debacle over the capture of U.S.S. Pueblo by North Korea, thereby mobilizing 372 fighter, bomber, and troop airplanes and bringing about the first type of mobilization since the Cuban Missile Crisis. Chief Justice Earl Warren hails LBJ as someone that can lead the US through the current turbulent times during a White House black tie event that night. Jerre Stockton Williams is sworn in as Chairman, Administrative Conference of the United States in the East Room during the afternoon.
- January 26 – President Johnson delivers a warning to North Korea that the US military is prepared for "any contingency that might arise in that area" while speaking over television and radio from the White House. President Johnson addresses student delegates at the 1968 Senate Youth Program in the East Room during the afternoon. President Johnson presents the Distinguished Service Medal to Wallace M. Greene, Jr. in the East Room during the afternoon.
- January 29 – In his annual budget message to Congress, President Johnson asks for 25.8 billion in the Vietnam War in 1969's fiscal year, a 1.3 billion increase from the expected costs of the fiscal year of 1968. Charles Zwick is sworn in as Director, Bureau of the Budget in the Cabinet Room during the morning.
- January 30 – President Johnson requests Congress raise the GI mortgage loan guarantee for the permitting of veterans to buy more homes that are more adequate and expensive.

== February ==
- February 1 – President Johnson delivers a speech on economics to Congress.
- February 2 – The White House releases transcript of a dialogue between President Johnson and George Meany, the two discussing the Vietnam War, crime, housing, education and health programs, and poverty.
- February 2 – The Senate confirms Edward R. De for the position of Assistant Secretary of State for Cultural Affairs.
- February 3 – Nixon gives his first speech in New Hampshire to a dinner audience, outlining his view that private enterprise should resolve the US's problems and cites LBJ not being able to travel around without fear of demonstration as reason the country should have "new leadership."
- February 3 – Radio Pyongyang says the US held its third secret meeting with North Koreans during the day. The claim is not confirmed by American officials.
- February 4 – Administration spokesman confirm President Johnson received written assurances from the Joint Chiefs of Staff ahead of committing the US military to defending the Khe Sanh Combat Base.
- February 7 – President Johnson announces the rebuilding of the Silver Bridge in remarks during a morning appearance in his White House office.
- February 8 – Prime Minister of Britain Harold Wilson warns President Johnson to fight off urges to appeal to "all those understandable demands" for moves that could "have incalculable effects" in the night hours.
- February 9 – President Johnson announces the brother of former president Dwight Eisenhower, Milton Eisenhower, as his choice to be sent to the US delegation at the Inter-American Cultural council session in Maracay, Venezuela the following week. The White House condemns a comment attributed to presidential candidate Eugene McCarthy from the previous day that tactical nuclear weapons were of request in Vietnam, McCarthy responding afterward that he had instead said that he would not be surprised if this was occurring in Vietnam, though the Associated Press reports a tape recording of McCarthy making the statement in the manner the White House claimed. Nixon says peace in Vietnam is only possible through continued pressure from the military during a press conference in Denver.
- February 10 – President Johnson releases a statement in conjunction with his signing of a proclamation marking the anniversary of the League of United Latin American Citizens. Johnson praises the LULAC as having always "recognized that education is the key that will open the doors of opportunity" and reflects on his tenure as a teacher in Cotulla, Texas showing him the aspirations of students dreaming for more learning.
- February 12 – President Johnson attends a ceremony commemorating the one hundred and fifty-ninth birthday of President Abraham Lincoln at the Lincoln Memorial during the afternoon. President Johnson delivers a speech on Lincoln's legacy, its relation to American society as well as across the world, and the resolve of Americans to achieve "a just and a lasting peace, among ourselves and with all nations."
- February 14 – President Johnson signs the Savings and Loan Holding Company Amendments of 1967 in the Fish Room during the afternoon. President Johnson says the legislation gives additional protections to Americans borrowing from savings and loans associations and marks the beginning of the Federal Home Loan Bank Board being able "to regulate and supervise holding companies which own or control insured associations."
- February 15 – President Johnson addresses the Washington Chapter of the National Conference of Christians and Jews in the International Ballroom at the Washington Hilton Hotel during the evening.
- February 17 – President Johnson delivers an address to troops at El Toro Marine Corps Air Station in California during the evening. In his remarks, Johnson speaks about the seriousness of the conflict in Vietnam and favorably of the soldiers who he calls "the sons of America's best years, the best years any nation, any people, have ever known."
- February 19 – In a statement, President Johnson responds to receiving the Industry-Government Special Task Force on Travel report, predicting that it will help with "our goal of reducing our travel deficit by $500 million this year" and have a growing impact with the passage of years.
- February 20 – President Johnson transmits the annual report of the Civil Service Commission to Congress in a message, urging "prompt consideration and passage of this legislation to strengthen our Federal system and assure more efficient conduct of programs with shared administrative responsibilities."
- February 22 – President Johnson sends a message to Congress outlining the issues in urban communities and reflects on the actions of the Johnson administration and Congress in correcting these problems, recommending appropriations of 2.18 billion for the antipoverty program for the fiscal year of 1969 and states that his other proposals to Congress if passed can "improve the lot and the life of the city dweller."
- February 23 – President Johnson releases a statement summarizing the response on his part to the Inter-Agency Committee on Mexican American Affairs.
- February 24 – President Johnson meets with leaders of the National Alliance of Businessmen Henry Ford II, Paul Austin, and Leo Beebe during the morning.
- February 26 – President Johnson transfers the Reorganization Plan 2 of 1968 to Congress in a special message; he advocates that Congress "transfer urban mass transportation programs to the Secretary of Transportation and to establish an Urban Mass Transportation Administration within the Department of Transportation to strengthen the organizational capacity of the Federal Government to achieve these objectives."
- February 27 – President Johnson attends the National Rural Electric Cooperative Association Convention at the Dallas Memorial Auditorium during the morning. President Johnson gives remarks at an evening birthday dinner for John Connally in the Gregory Gymnasium at the University of Texas.
- February 28 – President Johnson gets stuck in the elevator with outgoing Secretary of Defense Robert McNamara and eleven other individuals for 12 minutes.
- February 29 – President Johnson attends the farewell ceremony for Defense Secretary McNamara during the afternoon. President Johnson delivers remarks at a State Dining Room dinner honoring American governors during the evening.

== March ==
- March 1 – Clark Clifford begins his tenure as United States Secretary of Defense after an East Room swearing in ceremony, during which President Johnson proclaims Clifford as having drafted the legislation for the establishment of the defense department during the tenure of former President Harry Truman.
- March 2 – President Johnson travels to Puerto Rico for the first time.
- March 3 – Chairman of President Johnson's National Advisory Commission on Civil Disorders and Governor of Illinois Otto Kerner, Jr. says the US cannot implement all of the recommendations of the commission to combating unrest by black Americans.
- March 6 – President Johnson addresses members of the Joint Savings Bank-Savings and Loan Committee on Urban Problems in the Cabinet Room during the morning. C. R. Smith is sworn in as the 18th United States Secretary of Commerce in the East Room during the afternoon. President Johnson issues a statement designating Ambassador Robert M. McKinney to lead the President's Foreign Visitor Program. President Johnson states his expectations regarding the findings including when he expects to have the results reported to him and that agencies cooperate with the endeavor.
- March 7 – President Johnson issues a statement on the death of Joseph William Martin Jr., praising his tenure in office and stating that "he will be missed but affectionately remembered."
- March 8 – President Johnson issues a statement on the Conservation Message, stating that he had sent an action program to Congress that will combat pollution, allow 120 million Americans to reach a national park in an afternoon drive, and give each community a place of pride.
- March 11 – John H. Crooker, Jr. is sworn in as Chairman, Civil Aeronautics Board in the East Room during the afternoon.
- March 13 – President Johnson signs S. 1155 in the Fish Room during the morning. The legislation acts as an amendment to the Export-Import Bank of 1945, changing the name to the Export-Import Bank of the United States of America.
- March 14 – President Johnson attends the Federal Woman's Award Ceremony in the Cabinet Room. President Johnson notes comments made about women by his predecessors and compliments the winners of the award with having influenced important fields.
- March 16 – President Johnson attends a meeting of the National Alliance of Businessmen at the Sheraton Park Hotel in Washington during the morning. Senator Robert F. Kennedy announces his candidacy in the Democratic presidential primaries.
- March 18 – President Johnson requests a national austerity program, warning "many needed actions" will be postponed by cuts to the budget of the administration in Minneapolis
- March 19 – The White House denies that President Johnson is prepared to make specific actions toward a change in the national austerity program.
- March 20 – RFK lambasts President Johnson's proposed housing plan during a Senate committee appearance, Secretary of Housing and Urban Development Robert C. Weaver responding that RFK's proposal is "a rich man's bill for poor people's housing."
- March 21 – President Johnson promises Americans a defeat of communist aggression and that honorable peace will be won in Vietnam while speaking in the flower garden of the White House.
- March 22 – President Johnson announces the nomination of Wilbur J. Cohen for Secretary of Health, Education, and Welfare.
- March 24 – Vice President Humphrey serves a notice that the administration does not agree with the worries of the national advisory civil disorders commission that the US was moving into two unequal societies with one black and one white.
- March 25 – President Johnson calls on labor unions and farm organizations for supporting programs by his administration that he claims are threatened by the election year's partisan politics, speaking to AFL–CIO and an agriculture department-sponsored farm policy conference.
- March 27 – The Senate approves by vote the authorization of both wiretapping and eavesdropping in investigations of criminals.
- March 28 – Senator McCarthy says President Johnson and Creighton Abrams should consider rebuilding the collapsed South Vietnamese government.
- March 29 – President Johnson says "grave peril" was signaled by the Memphis riot and that the government will assist local law enforcement prevent a summer of racial violence in two speeches as well as a formal statement.
- March 31 – President Johnson announces at the end of a speech that he will not run for reelection nor accept the nomination of the Democratic Party if offered.

== April ==
- April 1 – President Johnson says he will meet with RFK whenever the latter is available.
- April 2 – President Johnson tells Democratic Party leaders during a meeting at the White House that he is not going to influence a particular candidate for the presidential nomination. Senator Everett Dirksen says during a press conference that President Johnson insisted he was not a candidate for office during meetings between the pair.
- April 4 – Assassination of Martin Luther King Jr. in Memphis, Tennessee. In response to King's death, Johnson cancels appearances in Hawaii for a war strategy meeting and a Democratic fundraiser, and speaks during the night hours with a request for calm and understanding.
- April 5 – President Johnson declares the day one of national mourning over the previous day's death of Martin Luther King Jr.
- April 6 – President Johnson postpones his planned speech to a joint session of congress in two days, White House press secretary George Christian saying that it was thought the funeral would be held on the same day when the president announced his postponing.
- April 7 – President Johnson sends 2,000 troops to Baltimore following the city being declared as rebellious by Governor of Maryland Spiro Agnew.
- April 8 – A formal communication from North Korea agreeing to peace talks is received by President Johnson. In the night hours, the president leaves for Camp David.
- April 10 – President Johnson holds his one hundred and twenty-third news conference in his White House office during the afternoon, answering questions from reporters on the civil rights bill, the President's Commission on Civil Disorders, exchanges with Hanoi, the whereabouts of John S. McCain, Jr., and Vice President Humphrey's potential presidential candidacy.
- April 11 – Civil Rights Act of 1968
- April 12 – The White House announces a meeting between President Johnson and President of South Korea Chung Hee Park in five days.
- April 14 – President Johnson observes Easter at two church services in Texas.
- April 15 – President Johnson requests North Korea cease delays and make a "serious and considered" response to the proposals for neutral areas where potential peace talks could emerge by the US.
- April 16 – President Johnson and Chairman of the Joint Chiefs of Staff General Earle Wheeler speak with Admiral Grant Sharp and Admiral John S. McCain, Jr. in the Pacific in an attempt to prepare for Johnson's upcoming meeting with Chung Hee Park.
- April 17 – President Johnson meets with Chung Hee Park to give assurance that the US will continue repelling aggression in South Korea, the two issuing a joint statement saying that North Korea's "belligerent and aggressive action" is a threat to South Korea's security.
- April 18 – Secretary of State Rusk extends the five US proposed North Vietnam contact peace talks sites to fifteen and accuses Hanoi of initiating propaganda warfare.
- April 19 – Nixon tells a luncheon that presidential candidates should refrain from critiquing President Johnson's policy on the Vietnam War until peace attempts have been resolved, critiquing RFK and McCarthy for their comments on the administration.
- April 21 – President Johnson attends a service in the morning hours at the St. Barnabas Episcopal Church in Fredericksburg, Texas.
- April 22 – Secretary of Defense Clark Clifford speaks during a luncheon where he says the Johnson administration has arrived at the conclusion that less US military force will be needed less and lead to a gradual withdrawal.
- April 23 – President Johnson announces US officials have been in talks with Hanoi officials and that another meeting is scheduled for tomorrow in the hope of agreeing on a location for Vietnam peace talks.
- April 24 – President Johnson says the US can only progress if both major political parties work for the best interest of the country while delivering a speech to the Cook County Democratic Party fundraising dinner at the Conrad Hilton hotel.
- April 25 – President Johnson delivers a speech to the Organization of Administrative Assistants to Democratic congressmen at a luncheon meeting of the Burro Club during the afternoon.
- April 26 – President Johnson addresses the Board of Trustees of the Urban Institute in the Cabinet Room during the morning. W. Marvin Watson is sworn in as Postmaster General in the Rose Garden during the afternoon.
- April 30 – President Johnson presents the National Teacher of the Year Award to David E. Graf in the Cabinet Room during the afternoon.

== May ==
- May 1 – The Johnson administration sends a proposal of 22 billion government economy package through the White House appropriations committee.
- May 2 – Wilbur Mills rejects the Johnson administration's budget proposal from the previous day; he says during a press conference that the terms were not clear and that it did not go as far back as needed in cutting spending.
- May 3 – President Johnson warns that violence could break out at the planned Washington poor people's march and "extensive preparations" have been made in advance. Johnson meets with former President Truman in Independence, Missouri to discuss the upcoming peace talks with North Vietnam in Paris.
- May 6 – President Johnson attends a reception for the White House Fellows in the State Dining Room during the afternoon. President Johnson delivers remarks at an afternoon reception in honor of Senator Carl Hayden in the Senate Office Building following Hayden's announcement that he would retire after seven terms in the Senate.
- May 7 – President Johnson presents the 1968 Scholastic Achievement Awards to blind college students in the Cabinet Room during the early afternoon.
- May 10 – Peace talks between the US and North Vietnam begin on bringing an end to the southeast Asia conflict.
- May 11 – President Johnson delivers an address to the White House Correspondents Association at the Washington Hilton Hotel during the evening. President Johnson speaks to the Business council and tells them the US cannot tolerate the current rapid price increases.
- May 13 – President Johnson sends a message to Congress transmitting "the first annual report on the administration of the Highway Safety Act of 1966."
- May 14 – President Johnson makes a morning appearance at the Pentagon to participate in a Hall of Heroes dedication and present the Medal of Honor to American service members.
- May 15 – President Johnson attends a dinner with President of Tunisia Habib Bourguiba in the State Dining Room during the evening.
- May 16 – A joint statement is released on the meeting of President Johnson and President Bourguiba detailing the content of their discussions. Wilbur J. Cohen is sworn in as the 7th United States Secretary of Health, Education, and Welfare in the East Room during the afternoon.
- May 17 – President Johnson attends a ceremony for the Law and Order Postage Stamp in the Fish Room during the morning. His remarks address gun control and general crime reforms.
- May 18 – President Johnson addresses members of the Association of American Editorial Cartoonists in the East Room during the afternoon.
- May 20 – President Johnson attends a dinner honoring founder and Chairman of the Arthritis Foundation Floyd B. Odlum in the Grand Ballroom of the Waldorf Astoria Hotel in New York City during the evening.
- May 22 – President Johnson signs into law legislation authorizing the study of automobile insurance by the government, the first of its kind. Congress sends a bill to President Johnson forcing banks and retailers to "clearly and conspicuously" state how much needs to be paid for the buying goods or being loaned money.
- May 25 – President Johnson, speaking during the International Ladies Garment Workers' convention, calls on voters to know from candidates how they would keep their campaign promises should they be elected and lists his legislative successes.
- May 27 – President Johnson delivers remarks at the White House welcome ceremony for Prime Minister of Australia John Gorton in the East Room during the morning.
- May 29 – President Johnson signs the Consumer Credit Protection Act in the East Room during the afternoon. President Johnson says the legislation will allow consumers to be privy to "how much interest he will have to pay on a credit purchase" and concurrently announces the establishment of the National Commission on Consumer Finance to study consumer protection. President Johnson delivers the commencement address at Texas Christian University during the evening.
- May 30 – President Johnson holds his one hundredth and twenty-seventh news conference at the LBJ Ranch in the afternoon. President Johnson answers questions on the Paris peace discussions, France developments, the tax bill, the bombing pause, comments made by General Westmoreland, and Prime Minister Gorton.
- May 31 – In a statement, President Johnson announces an increase "in the interest rates for both United States savings bonds and Freedom Shares" that will commence the following day.

== June ==
- June 1 – Chairman of the board of regents of the University of Texas Frank C. Erwin, Jr. says he has spoken with President Johnson and the latter has indicated an interest in teaching political science and government.
- June 3 – President Johnson releases a statement on the death of Helen Keller.
- June 4 – Johnson's request for the Communists' aid in scaling the Vietnam War down and making peace is responded to with a decline by a North Vietnam spokesman. President Johnson delivers the commencement address at Glassboro State College in Glassboro, New Jersey during the morning.
- June 5 – The Viet Cong throws an estimated two more guerilla battalions into their battle for Saigon.
- June 6 – Robert F. Kennedy dies. President Johnson signs a resolution designating Secret Service protection for all major presidential candidates after Congress votes in favor of it earlier in the day. Johnson declares the upcoming June 9 a day of mourning.
- June 8 – President Johnson attends RFK's funeral.
- June 10 – President Johnson signs Executive Order 11412, establishing the National Commission on the Causes and Prevention of Violence during an afternoon appearance in the Cabinet Room. After the signing, Johnson delivers remarks on the continued usage of violence in American society and notes several assassinations and assassination attempts to have occurred within the past century alone. President Johnson attends a reception for the Presidential Scholars of 1968 in the East Room during the afternoon.
- June 11 – President Johnson attends the graduation exercises of the Capitol Page School in the East Room during the afternoon. President Johnson's remarks are composed of addressing the continued violence and divisiveness within the US and recounting his announcement to not run for re-election. President Johnson issues Executive Order 11414, imposing an adjustment on the monthly pay basic for service members.
- June 13 – President Johnson accepts the Swords Into Plowshares Award in the Cabinet Room during the afternoon. President Johnson addresses the nonproliferation treaty in his remarks.
- June 14 – President Johnson transmits the fourth annual report on the status of the National Wilderness Preservation System, which covers the previous year, to Congress in a message.
- June 28 – President Johnson signs H.R. 15951 into law, stating that Memorial Day, Veterans Day, and Washington's Birthday will be celebrated on Mondays. President Johnson signs the Revenue and Expenditure Control Act of 1968 into law. The legislation imposes a temporary 10 percent income tax surcharge on both individuals and corporations through June 30, 1969.
- June 29 – President Johnson attends the dedication of the J. Percy Priest Project in Nashville, Tennessee during the morning. President Johnson releases a statement noting the upcoming second anniversary of the Medicare program noting and praising the changes made since its inception.

== July ==
- July 1 – President Johnson announces Russia has agreed to meet with the US for the discussion on nuclear weapon systems being limited and reduced. The White House announces the upcoming trip of President Johnson to El Salvador for the latter to meet with Central American republics' presidents.
- July 3 – North Vietnam announces the release of three American pilots without saying when they will be released nor who they are.
- July 4 – President Johnson releases a statement condemning the previous day's protesting of a Minneapolis speech by presidential candidate George Wallace.
- July 5 – The Defense Department announces August 1 as the beginning of Vietnam soldiers being able to obtain discharge earlier with an agreement to remain in Vietnam longer.
- July 6 – President Johnson arrives in El Salvador and is met with protestors. President Johnson meets with five Central American presidents and they jointly declare support for Latin America having a common market developed. President Johnson delivers remarks at the working session of the Presidents of the Central American Republics in San Salvador at the Hotel El Salvador Intercontinental during the afternoon.
- July 7 – President Johnson visits two schools, the United States embassy, and a rural area in San Salvador. President Johnson delivers remarks at the Lyndon B. Johnson School in the courtyard of the school during the morning. Johnson praises the effects of Latin friends on his life and his appreciation for having a school named after him.
- July 8 – Dean of the United States House of Representatives Emanuel Celler states he will oppose an attempt by President Johnson to attach the registration of gun owners to any gun legislation.
- July 9 – Legislation banning interstate gun sales and over the counter sales to residents that are not denizens of the state is cleared by the House rules committee.
- July 13 – Secretary of Defense Clifford rejects immediate cease-fire in Vietnam alongside charging North Vietnam with doubling down on its war effort.
- July 15 – President Johnson signs S. 1401 in the East Room during the morning. The legislation doubles the Land and Water Conservation Fund to 200 million over the course of the next five years.
- July 16 – President Johnson addresses members of the Future Farmers of America in the Rose Garden during the morning.
- July 29 – President Johnson addresses officers of the National Association of Counties in the Cabinet Room during the afternoon. In his remarks, Johnson addresses a geographic inequality that he states as affecting America and what the administration has done to combat these ills.
- July 31 – President Johnson holds his one hundredth and twenty-ninth news conference in the Cabinet Room during the afternoon. President Johnson answers questions from reporters on the subjects of Vietnam, the National Liberation Front in Vietnam, the steel situation, Paris peace discussions, assessment made to missile disarmament discussions, District of Columbia, and Supreme Court appointments.

== August ==
- August 1 – At the Department of Housing and Urban Development, President Johnson signs a housing bill, providing 5.8 billion for the following three years for a program intended to construct 26 million housing units over the next ten years, President Johnson saying it could potentially be the Magna Charta for liberating cities and praising Congress' enacting of the bill after "decades of neglect." Late in the day, President Johnson authorizes the defense department to switch company steel orders to companies that have raised prices.
- August 2 – President Johnson talks with former President Dwight D. Eisenhower and Mamie Eisenhower at the Walter Reeds Army Hospital as the former president recovers from a heart attack, Johnson telling reporters afterward that he and Eisenhower discussed steel but insisted Eisenhower would not influence his further actions.
- August 3 – President Johnson orders government civilian agencies to purchase the cheapest steel available to them in a move seen as being against defiant steel producers.
- August 5 – President Johnson's proposed anti-riot legislation is sent to Congress, giving five year imprisonment and $10,000 fine as maximum penalties for individuals found to have crossed state lines for the purpose of inciting civil disorder.
- August 21 – President Johnson announces the Warsaw Pact invasion of Czechoslovakia as well as his demands the withdrawal of the troops of the Soviet Union and its Warsaw pact allies. The US accuses North Vietnam of halting the progression of peace talks in Paris with its "rigidity and inflexibility".
- August 22 – Johnson administration officials say that President Johnson and other major officials were made privy of the possibility of an invasion of Czechoslovakia three weeks before the crossing of Czech frontiers by the Russians.
- August 24 – While speaking to Southwest Texas State graduates, President Johnson insists he is not going to be a candidate for anything except "maybe a rocking chair" and would use the remainder of his time in office to speak on issues mattering to him.

== September ==
- September 2 – President Johnson releases a statement marking the occasion of Labor Day, noting what he considers various improvements in American life.
- September 4 – President Johnson issues Executive Order 11427, ending the four-year-old Maritime Advisory Committee. President Johnson transmits a special report on the joint comprehensive review of the United States-Canada Automotive Products Agreement in a message to Congress.
- September 9 – President Johnson attends the dedication for the building for the Department of Housing and Urban Development.
- September 10 – President Johnson releases a statement commemorating the tenth anniversary of the National Defense Education Act reflecting on the speech he gave in the Senate in favor of the law and noted the differences within the decade since the bill was signed into law.
- September 26 – President Johnson transmits the ninth annual report on Weather Modification to Congress in a message.
- September 28 – President Johnson attends the Convention of the National Association of Postmasters in the International Ballroom at the Washington Hilton Hotel during the afternoon. President Johnson attends the dedication of the Thomas More College during the afternoon.
- September 30 – President Johnson attends a meeting of the World Bank and the International Monetary Fund at the Sheraton Park Hotel during the morning. President Johnson signs the Colorado River Basin Project Act in the East Room during the afternoon. President Johnson says the bill "will be one of the largest reclamation projects ever authorized in any single piece of legislation."

== October ==
- October 1 – President Johnson attends a morning meeting of the Incorporators of the National Housing Partnership in the Cabinet Room. President Johnson releases a statement on the tenth anniversary of the National Aeronautics and Space Administration noting the progress that has been made since its inception and honoring all of those involved in creating NASA. President Johnson signs a bill establishing the Flaming Gorge National Recreation Area. In a statement released concurrently with the signing, President Johnson says the bill "will guarantee this generation and its descendants that these 201,000 acres of rich land and sparkling water will remain forever unspoiled." President Johnson transmits the 22nd annual report of American involvement in the United Nations to Congress in a message. The report serves as an overview of the previous year.
- October 2 – President Johnson releases a statement confirming his acceptance of Supreme Court nominee Abe Fortas' withdrawal from consideration. President Johnson states his high opinion of Fortas and his discontent with the choice made on the part of members of the Senate, noting his own membership within the upper chamber of Congress.
- October 4 – President Johnson transmits the annual report of the Office of Alien Property for the fiscal year of 1967 in a message to Congress.
- October 7 – President Johnson issues Proclamation 3876, designating the day as "Child Health Day." President Johnson urges agencies and organizations concerned with the state of children worldwide to come together during the holiday "in actions that will bring strength and recognition to efforts which foster better child health."
- October 8 – President Johnson transmits the twelfth annual report on the Trade Agreements Program to Congress. The report, covering 1967, is accompanied by a statement from President Johnson in which the latter notes that he has "directed the Special Representative for Trade Negotiations to conduct a long-range study of trade policy." President Johnson signs S. 3068, an amendment of the Food Stamp Act of 1964. The legislation extends the program for three years and is said by Johnson to call "for a substantial increase in expenditures to meet the tragedy of hunger in America."
- October 9 – President Johnson signs H.R. 16175 into law, setting aside "surplus land at the old National Bureau of Standards site for a new international complex." President Johnson says the land will be used as the site for an international center in the American capital. President Johnson signs the Foreign Assistance Act of 1968. In a statement released concurrently with the signing, President Johnson notes his concern for the "serious reductions in the amounts authorized under this act and the further reductions in foreign aid appropriations which the House has now voted."
- October 11 – President Johnson signs H.R. 17126, extending the Food and Agriculture Act of 1965 by an additional year. In a statement, President Johnson says the bill continues basic agricultural commodities and voices his discontent with Congress not acting on his recommendations in a special message on February 27 that year.
- October 13 – President Johnson signs H.R. 17524, an amendment to the Merchant Marine Act of 1936 that extends the federal government's "authority to subsidize the cost of merchant vessels constructed in U.S.. shipyards" by a year. In a statement released concurrent with the signing, President Johnson notes that he would have preferred to have signed "a measure which completely restructures our merchant marine policy to meet the modern realities of this important industry" and charges Congress with not having "dealt with the maritime problem in the comprehensive manner proposed by the administration."
- October 15 – President Johnson signs H.R. 15758 into law during a morning appearance in the Cabinet Room. The legislation is an amendment to the Public Health Service Act and is said by President Johnson to "help millions of citizens in literally dozens of ways." President Johnson accepts a gold-plated branding iron as a reward for his participation in furthering savings bond programs in the Cabinet Room during the afternoon.
- October 16 – President Johnson signs the Intergovernmental Cooperation Act in the Cabinet Room during the afternoon. The legislation is said by President Johnson to bestow hundreds of federal grants across the states, provide superior information to Governors and Senators regarding the aforementioned grants, better "regional and local planning", and offer federal agencies to share exclusive abilities and information with both state and local governments. President Johnson attends the annual dinner of the Alfred E. Smith Memorial Foundation at the Waldorf-Astoria Hotel during the evening.
- October 18 – President Johnson signs the Radiation Control for Health and Safety Act of 1968 in the Cabinet Room during the afternoon. President Johnson says it will be the last consumer measure that he signs in office and calls it "protection for all Americans."
- October 21 – President Johnson attends an award ceremony presenting the Outstanding Employers of the Handicapped in the Cabinet Room during the afternoon.
- October 22 – President Johnson signs the Gun Control Act of 1968 in the Cabinet Room during the morning. President Johnson says the legislation imposes regulations on firearms including lethal weapons being sold to minors and banning interstate gun sales, and notes his discontent with Congress not acting on proposals by the administration.
- October 23 – President Johnson addresses the Assistant and Regional Directors of the Office of Economic Opportunity in the Cabinet Room at the White House during the afternoon.
- October 24 – President Johnson signs the Military Justice Act of 1968 in the Cabinet Room during the afternoon. President Johnson says the legislation continues the work began by the Uniform Code of Military Justice and establishes an independent court system within the American military.
- October 27 – President Johnson attends a luncheon for the All Americans Council of the Democratic National Committee at the Waldorf-Astoria Hotel in New York City during the afternoon.
- October 29 – President Johnson attends a presentation ceremony for the White House Fellows Association Report in the Cabinet Room during the afternoon.
- October 30 – President Johnson releases a statement congratulating the United States Olympic Team for their victory, declaring that the United States is in the team's debt and the win "brought new honor to our country."
- October 31 – Remarks are aired of President Johnson announcing a bombing halt in North Vietnam during the evening. The address was recorded the previous day in the Family Theater at the White House.

== November ==
- November 1 – President Johnson sends a message to his son-in-law Charles Robb on his promotion to Major within the military as well as the birth of his daughter the previous week.
- November 2 – The government of North Vietnam in Hanoi announces its attendance of peace talks in Paris with the US while urging South Vietnam soldiers to win in the ongoing conflict.
- November 3 – President Johnson appears with Vice President Humphrey in Houston, Texas for the latter's presidential campaign.
- November 4 – President Johnson releases a statement in response to his earlier release of a report on the environment's noise reporting on facts relating to the environment and what he views as paramount to solving the problem.
- November 5 – The 46th quadrennial presidential election occurs. Republican nominee former Vice President Richard Nixon of California wins the 1968 presidential election against Democratic nominee Vice President Hubert Humphrey of Minnesota. Therefore, Richard Nixon becomes President-elect.
- November 5 – President Johnson sends a telegram to Vice President Humphrey lauding his efforts during his presidential campaign.
- November 6 – President Johnson signs Executive Order 11433, establishing an emergency board to investigate the dispute between Illinois Central Railroad Company, Louisville & Nashville Railroad Company, and the Belt Railway Company of Chicago.
- November 8 – President Johnson announces his authorizing of a "2.5 million contribution to the International Committee of the Red Cross to aid the victims of the Nigerian civil war."
- November 11 – President Johnson meets with President-elect Nixon at the White House during the afternoon. The two make a joint appearance outside the West Lobby outlining the contents of their meeting. President Johnson issues a statement on the occasion of Veterans Day.
- November 12 – Defense Secretary Clifford rebukes the South Vietnam withdrawal of compromise expanding the Paris peace talks while ceasing bombing in North Vietnam during a press conference.
- November 14 – The State Department confirms contact between the US and Soviet Union on the subject of possible harassment actions being launched by communists in West Berlin.
- November 15 – Johnson states during a press conference that any foreign policy decisions will be made by him until the inauguration of the president-elect.
- November 16 – Secretary of State Rusk arrives in Madrid during the night hours for discussion about joint US-Spanish military bases within Spain.
- November 19 – President Johnson delivers an address to White House secretaries in the Fish Room of the White House during the afternoon. President Johnson attends the Annual Equal Opportunity Awards Dinner of the National Urban League in the ballroom of the New York Hilton Hotel in New York City during the evening.
- November 20 – President Johnson meets with Vice President-elect Spiro Agnew for a discussion on foreign affairs and the vice presidency.
- November 21 – President Johnson meets with the National Water Commission in the Cabinet Room during the morning.
- November 22 – President Johnson joins members of the Kennedy family in observing the fifth anniversary of the assassination of the late President John F. Kennedy at the latter's grave in Arlington National Cemetery. North Korea request the US to being Paris peace talks after Saigon ends the ongoing boycott against negotiations.
- November 24 – Defense Secretary Clifford states the US potentially could resume bombing of North Korea should communists decline good faith negotiations.
- November 25 – During the night hours, US officials make the announcement that South Vietnam's government has contacted the US and stated its readiness to participate in the Paris peace talks.
- November 26 – President Johnson releases a statement responding to the Republic of Vietnam choosing to participate in the Paris peace talks, saying that their decision "opens a new and hopeful phase in the negotiations" and struggles should be expected within the negotiations.
- November 28 – North Vietnam alleges the shooting down of eight US planes by North Vietnam since the north bombing halt by President Johnson three weeks prior.

== December ==
- December 1 – Secretary of State Rusk portrays Russia as having responsibility in the end of the Vietnam War, citing that bombing has ceased in North Korea and saying the Soviet Union must do everything in its power to ensure the progression toward peace in southeast Asia.
- December 2 – President-elect Nixon says that under the direction of Henry Kissinger, the White House security planning machinery will be entirety changed.
- December 4 – President Johnson delivers a speech to the Business Council at the Mayflower Hotel during the evening.
- December 12 – President Johnson meets with President-elect Nixon at the White House and assures the latter that he will be available at any time to brief members of the upcoming cabinet on the operations of their departments. President Johnson gives an informal speech in the White House East Room, saying the things Americans want the most are "peace in the world, jobs, food, and a house."
- December 14 – President Johnson asserts the US must provide low cost housing for the impoverished for the solution of major social problems during a ceremony commemorating the federal financed low-cost housing project in Austin, Texas.
- December 15 – Secretary of Defense Clifford calls on South Vietnam to cease complaints over seating arrangements and decide with North Vietnam to discuss actual problems in Paris.
- December 16 – President Johnson makes a public prayer for "peace and reconciliation" amid his lighting of the national community Christmas tree.
- December 17 – President Johnson accepts the Postal Service's Honor Award in the Departmental Auditorium in Washington during the morning. President Johnson attends a reception in his honor at the Federal City Club at the Sheraton-Carlton Hotel in Washington during the evening.
- December 19 – President Johnson releases a statement on the death of Norman Thomas mourning that his passing marks the loss of one of the United States' "most eloquent speakers" and lauding Thomas for his speaking and writing skills.
- December 20 – President Johnson releases a statement responding to the ineffectiveness of the Taft-Hartley Act to settle the dispute between the International Longshoremen's Association and other shipping associations.
- December 21 – Apollo 8 is launched.
- December 22 – President Johnson returns to the White House from his hospitalization. Secretary of State Rusk speaks on a nationwide television broadcast, officially confirming the 32 survivors of the Pueblo.
- December 29 – Walter Rostow says President Johnson considers the Israeli Beirut airport raid "serious and unwise".
- December 30 – The White House states the avoiding of participation in the unseating of John W. McCormick by President Johnson.
- December 31 – The State Department discloses there has been contact between the US and Soviet Union on easing tensions in the Middle East. Secretary of Health, Education, and Welfare Wilbur J. Cohen says he will not increase the $4 a month premium aiding in paying the bills of doctors.

== January (1969) ==
- January 14 – President Johnson delivers the 1969 State of the Union Address to a joint session of Congress.
- January 20 – President Johnson finishes his time in office and departs the White House with the First Lady Lady Bird Johnson. His successor, Richard Nixon, was inaugurated as the 37th president of the United States, at noon EST. Lyndon B. Johnson began his post-presidency.
