= Timeline of the Richard Nixon presidency (1971) =

Historical timeline

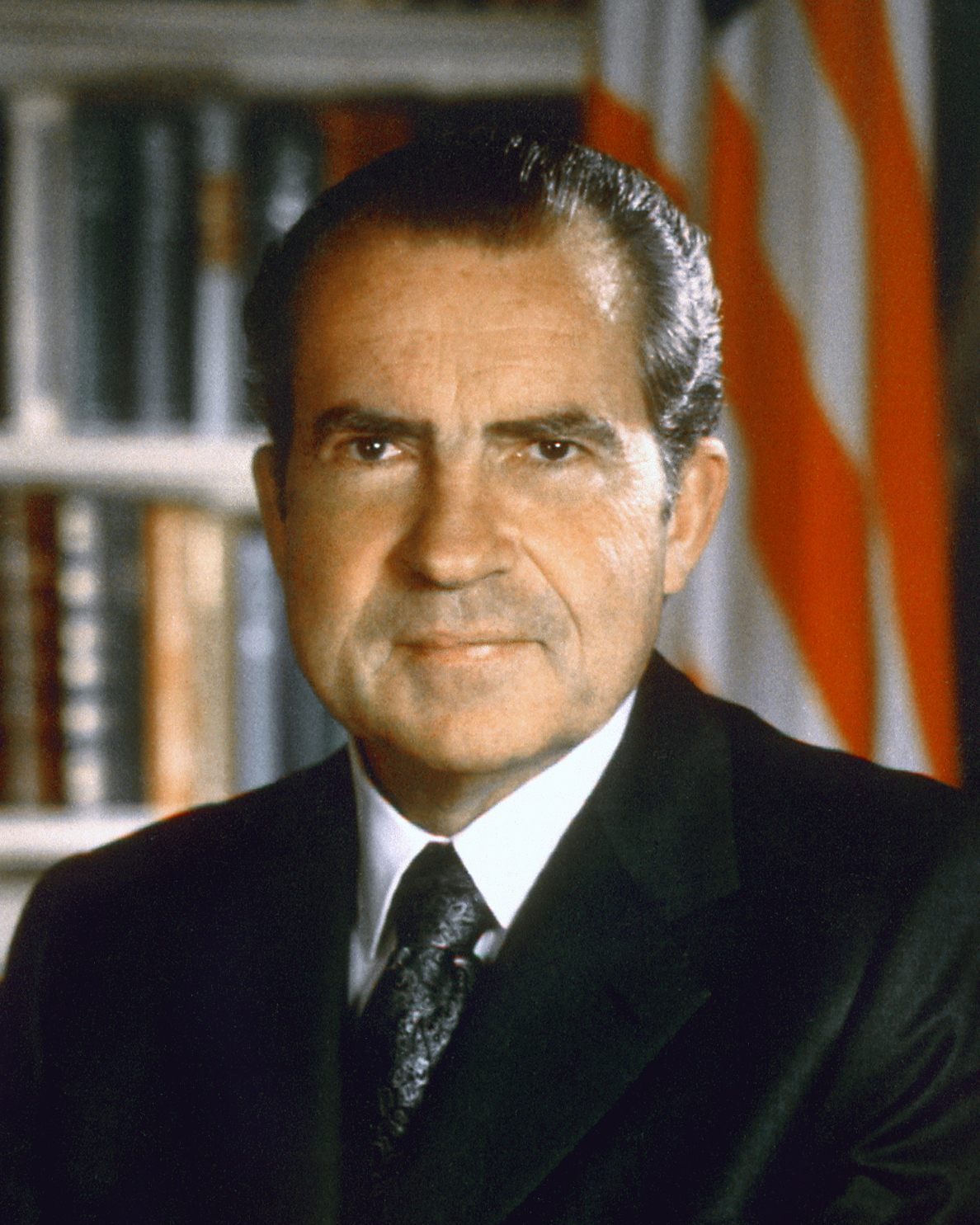
Nixon in 1971

The following is a timeline of the presidency of Richard Nixon from January 1, 1971, to December 31, 1971.

== January ==
- January 1 – President Nixon spends New Year's Day at Camp David with his family and aides.
- January 2 – The White House releases the text of a message sent to Congress by President Nixon the previous day alongside his vetoing of a bill raising the pay for roughly 850,000 federal workers.
- January 12 – President Nixon signs into law the Foreign Military Sales Act, repealing the Gulf of Tonkin Resolution.
- January 22 – President Nixon delivers the 1971 State of the Union Address to a joint session of Congress.

== February ==
- February 16 – Secret Service Agents install the White House Taping system. Its operation will be refined over the months to improve its reception.

== March ==
- March 24 – In a 51–46 vote, the Senate cuts off government funding for the Nixon-supported supersonic transport airplane.

== April ==
- April 7 – President Nixon publicly announces that another 100 thousand American troops will be withdrawn from the Vietnam war, telling the Nation in his only 1971 televised address about Vietnam that "I can assure you tonight with confidence that American involvement in this war is coming to an end".

== May ==
- May 2 – The White House secretly revokes the campsite permits for thousands of Vietnam war protesters, and disperses police in riot gear. Over the next three days, over 12 thousand protesters were arrested, the largest mass arrest in American history.

== June ==
- June 13 – President Nixon unveils an executive order to allow trade with the Communist China, lifting a 21 year old trade embargo.
- June 13 – The New York Times begins publishing excerpts from the Pentagon Papers.
- June 15 – The White House obtains an interim court ruling to stop the publication of the Pentagon Papers.

== July ==
- July 5 – President Nixon formally certifies the twenty-sixth amendment to the Constitution, lowering the voting age from 21 to 18.
- July 15 – President Nixon announces that he had been invited to visit China.

== August ==
- August 15 – Nixon announces his 'New Economic Policy', marking an end to the Bretton Woods system.

== September ==
- November 26 – President Nixon briefly meets with Japanese Emperor Hirohito, who is the first sitting Emperor to ever step foot on foreign soil.

== October ==
- October 21 – President Nixon nominates Lewis F. Powell and William H. Rehnquist to the Supreme Court of the United States, replacing retired associate justices Hugo Black and John Marshall Harlan II, respectively.

== November ==
- November 3 – Secretary of Defense Laird meets with top American officials based in Saigon on intentions to send thousands of GIs back to the US during the holiday season.
- November 8 – The White House states its interest in the imposition of revisions made to a water pollution control bill sponsored by Senator Edmund Muskie.
- November 16 – Secretary of Health, Education, and Welfare Richardson discloses that the Nixon administration is looking into reforming the Social Security accounting system. The Senate votes 53 to 29 in favor of President Nixon having the authority to impose a 15% surcharge on imports into the US. Secretary of the Treasury Connally lauds the wage-price increase as successful and foresees post-freeze controls cutting inflation in half during the following year.

== December ==
- December 2 – Earl Butz is sworn in as the 18th United States Secretary of Agriculture.
- December 9 – President Nixon vetoes a federal childcare program that he charges as too costly and unworkable. Congress sends a tax cut bill to President Nixon reducing the taxes on individuals and businesses by US$15.8 billion during the night.
- December 10 – President Nixon signs a tax bill, cutting consumer and business taxes by 15.8 billion over the following three years, into law. William Rehnquist is confirmed to the United States Supreme Court by a Senate vote of 68 to 26.
- December 11 – United States Deputy Secretary of Defense David Packard resigns.
- December 12 – Secretary of State Rogers said continued lack of action by the United Nations on the India-Pakistan War would portray the UN as ineffective while speaking to reporters.
