= Timeline of the Bill Clinton presidency =

Bill Clinton, a Democrat from Arkansas, was elected President of the United States on November 3, 1992 and was inaugurated as the nation's 42nd president on January 20, 1993. He was re-elected on November 5, 1996; his second inauguration was on January 20, 1997, and his presidency ended on January 20, 2001, with the inauguration of George W. Bush. The following articles cover the timeline of Clinton's presidency, and the time leading up to it:

- Pre-presidency: 1991–1993
  - Bill Clinton 1992 presidential campaign
  - Presidential transition of Bill Clinton
- Presidency: 1993–2001
  - Timeline of the Bill Clinton presidency (1993)
  - Timeline of the Bill Clinton presidency (1994)
  - Timeline of the Bill Clinton presidency (1995)
  - Timeline of the Bill Clinton presidency (1996)
  - Timeline of the Bill Clinton presidency (1997)
  - Timeline of the Bill Clinton presidency (1998)
  - Timeline of the Bill Clinton presidency (1999)
  - Timeline of the Bill Clinton presidency (2000–2001)
- Post-presidency of Bill Clinton: 2001–present

== See also ==
- Timeline of the George H. W. Bush presidency, for his predecessor
- Timeline of the George W. Bush presidency, for his successor
