= Timeline of the Bill Clinton presidency (1993) =

The following is a timeline of the presidency of Bill Clinton from his inauguration as the 42nd president of the United States on January 20, 1993, to December 31, 1993.

== January ==
- January 20 – The inauguration of Bill Clinton takes place at the United States Capitol in Washington, D.C.
- January 21 – Sources state President Clinton is seeking the assistance of First Lady Hillary Clinton in developing a healthcare plan. Administration officials state President Clinton intends to hold a cabinet meeting over American involvement in the Bosnian War (1992–1995), for an increase in humanitarian efforts.
- January 22 – President Clinton issues an executive order undoing abortion restrictions put in place by the Ronald Reagan and George H. W. Bush administrations.

== February ==
- February 1 – President Clinton meets with American governors in the East Room during the morning. Right after its conclusion, President Clinton says the meeting was "simply an honest discussion where real work was done, real opinions were argued and a room filled with women and men who left their partisan banners outside the door." President Clinton attends the Democratic Governors' Association Dinner at the National Building Museum during the evening. President Clinton issues a statement on his administration revoking Executive Orders 12800 and 12818, policies enacted under the Bush administration during the previous year. President Clinton announces the nomination of Kenneth D. Brody for President and Chairman of the Export-Import Bank of the United States.
- February 2 – President Clinton addresses the National Governors' Association at the J.W. Marriott Hotel during the morning. President Clinton announces the nomination of Terry Duvernay for Deputy Secretary of Housing and Urban Development, and Andrew Cuomo for Assistant Secretary for Community Planning and Development.
- February 3 – President Clinton delivers an address to employees of the Office of Management and Budget in the New Executive Office Building during the morning. President Clinton states his intent to reduce the country's deficit when answering an inquiring on the subject of social security recipients during an afternoon appearance in the Roosevelt Room.
- February 4 – President Clinton attends the National Prayer Breakfast at the Washington Hilton during the morning. President Clinton attends a dinner in honor of the New Jersey Congressional Delegation in the Washington Sheraton Hotel during the evening.
- February 5 – President Clinton holds his second news conference with Prime Minister of Canada Brian Mulroney in the South Lawn during the afternoon. Questions are posed and answered regarding relations between the United States and Canada, the North American Free Trade Agreement, Haiti, Israel, and Bosnia. President Clinton addresses the National Conference of Mayors in the State Dining Room.
- February 6 – President Clinton delivers a radio address in the Oval Office during the morning. His remarks are geared toward addressing the incomes of families and the policies being enacted by his administration to raise the living standard, citing the need "build a high-growth, high-skilled, high-wage economy by investing in the health, the education, the job training, and the technologies of our people and their future."
- February 8 – President Clinton announces the establishment of the White House Office on Environmental Policy in the Roosevelt Room during the morning. President Clinton answers questions from reporters on the Social Security taxes of all of the administration's cabinet and deputy secretaries, the paying of back taxes, and Bosnia in the Oval Office during the afternoon.
- February 9 – President Clinton addresses the reorganization and reduction of the White House staff in remarks in the Briefing Room during the morning. Speaking to reporters in the Oval Office during the afternoon, President Clinton says he "gave up 350 staff members".
- February 10 – President Clinton holds a meeting with his cabinet in the Cabinet Room during the morning. The meeting centers around staff reductions within their various departments and President Clinton signs three executive orders centered around reduction and commissions. President Clinton participated in a televised town meeting program in the studios of WXYZ-TV in Detroit. He fielded questions from the studio audience as well as studio audiences in Miami, Florida and Washington state while seated on a stool in the Detroit studio. President responds to 1993 Jack in the Box E. coli outbreak in the Pacific Northwest.
- February 11 – President Clinton delivers an address to business leaders in the East Room during the morning. President Clinton holds his third news conference in the Rose Garden during the afternoon. President Clinton announces his nomination of Janet Reno for United States Attorney General at the start of the conference and Reno answers questions on whether she is a feminist, her qualifications, and her stances on immigration law.
- February 12 – President Clinton answers questions from reporters over the feedback he has received from congressmen and whether he believes Republicans will get along with him during an afternoon appearance in the State Dining Room. President Clinton announces the nomination of James Lee Witt for Director of the Nation's Federal Emergency.
- February 13 – President Clinton meets with the Economic Policy Group for a discussion on the budget.
- February 15 – President Clinton denies that he will appear before Congress and that the administration seeks to change the course of the past twelve years under his two immediate predecessors in the Roosevelt Room during the morning. President Clinton delivers an evening Oval Office address previewing his speech to Congress and reflecting on the current climate of the economy.
- February 16 – President Clinton delivers remarks via satellite from Room 459 of the Old Executive Office Building to the California Economic Conference during the afternoon.
- February 17 – President Clinton delivers an address before a joint session of the members of Congress outlining his administration goals.
- February 18 – President Clinton delivers an address at the Union Station in St. Louis, Missouri during the afternoon.
- February 19 – President Clinton announces the nomination of Thomas Glynn for the position of Deputy Secretary of Labor.
- February 20 – President Clinton attends a town hall meeting in the East Room during the morning, answering questions from Peter Jennings concerning the White House, the presidency, Little Rock school integration, his daughter, women in elected office, civil disturbances in Los Angeles, health care reform, his education, violence in schools, and proposed handgun legislation.
- February 21 – President Clinton delivers an afternoon address at Santa Monica College in Santa Monica, California.
- February 22 – President Clinton has a telephone conversation with Larry Villella on CBS radio and the economy while on Air Force One. President Clinton delivers an address to employees of Boeing in Hangar 40–23 at Boeing in Everett, Washington during the afternoon.
- February 23 – President Clinton attends the U.S. Chamber of Commerce National Business Action Rally at DAR Construction Hall during the morning. President Clinton answers questions aboard Air Force One during the afternoon on his impending discussions with United Nations Secretary-General Boutros Boutros-Ghali.
- February 24 – President Clinton releases a statement on the intended resignation of Prime Minister of Canada Brian Mulroney praising him and his country.
- February 26 – The World Trade Center in New York City is bombed by terrorist Ramzi Yousef, who detonated a truck bomb in the basement of the North Tower. Six people are killed and over 1,000 are injured.
- February 28 – Four federal ATF agents were killed in a botched raid on the Branch Davidian compound in Waco, TX. This event led to a stand-off that lasted 51 days before ending in a fire on April 19, 1993.

== March ==
- March 1 – President Clinton participates in a question-and-answer session at the Adult Learning Center in New Brunswick, New Jersey during the morning. President Clinton delivers an address at Rutgers University during the afternoon.
- March 2 – President Clinton answers questions from reporters in the Oval Office regarding the Waco incident and Haiti during the afternoon.
- March 3 – President Clinton announces the National Performance Review in Room 450 of the Old Executive Building during the morning.
- March 8 – President Clinton delivers an address to the Legislative Conference of the National League of Cities at the Washington Hilton during the afternoon. President Clinton says the administration "will have a budget resolution which will be roughly conforming to the reestimates of the CBO in general terms and that will still contain the investment strategy that I want to pursue" in the Roosevelt Room during the afternoon.
- March 10 – President Clinton releases a statement on the Forest Conference endorsing it and saying in part that it "is time to break the gridlock that has blocked action and bring all sides together to craft a balanced approach to the economic and environmental challenges we face."
- March 11 – President Clinton delivers an address to employees of Westinghouse at Westinghouse Electric Corporation in Linthicum, Maryland during the afternoon.
- March 13 – President Clinton speaks by telephone with Governor of Florida Lawton Chiles, who requests individual and public assistance in responding to the "excessive rainfall, tornadoes, flooding, high tides, and gale force winds caused death, serious personal injury, and property damage in the State of Florida." President Clinton grants the request in a public statement later that day.
- March 15 – President Clinton holds his sixth press conference in the East Room with Prime Minister of Israel Yitzhak Rabin during the afternoon, answering questions from reporters on peace talks regarding the Middle East, Palestinian deportees, West Bank and Gaza Strip, Syria, security issues, Russia, and North Korea.
- March 16 – President Clinton says that goals of the administration in deficit reduction require cuts to the defense budget while speaking to reporters in the Cabinet Room during the morning. President Clinton announces the nomination of Erskine Bowles for head of the Small Business Administration.
- March 18 – President Clinton addresses employees of Treasury Department in the department's Cash Room during the morning. President Clinton announces the nomination of Mortimer L. Downey for Deputy Secretary of Transportation.
- March 19 – President Clinton responds to the retirement of Associate Justice Byron R. White in a morning South Lawn appearance. President Clinton says the timing of the retirement announcement was explained to him by White over a conversation the pair had, with White stating that he wanted a Clinton appointee to be confirmed prior to the beginning of the next Supreme Court term in October.
- March 23 – President Clinton delivers an address to members of the Democratic Governors Association as well as state and business leaders in the State Dining Room during the afternoon.
- March 24 – President Clinton addresses the position of the administration on Russia in the State Dining Room during the afternoon.
- March 27 – President Clinton delivers a morning radio address in the Oval Office during the morning. Clinton reflects on his nine weeks in office and outlines the state of the country and the administration's efforts toward bettering the US.
- March 29 – President Clinton announces the nomination of Roger Johnson for head of General Services Administration.
- March 30 – President Clinton announces the nomination of Ruth Harkin for President of the Overseas Private Investment Corporation.

== April ==
- April 1 – President Clinton answers a question from a reporter on the status of the stimulus package during a morning appearance in the Cabinet Room.
- April 1 – President Clinton addresses midshipmen in Bancroft Hall of the United States Naval Academy in Annapolis, Maryland.
- April 1 – President Clinton addresses the American Society of Newspaper Editors in Dahlgren Hall of the United States Naval Academy in Annapolis.
- April 1 – During a session with the American Society of Newspaper Editors, President Clinton answers questions on Bosnia, freedom of the press, trade negotiations and Russia, Ross Perot, partnership between the public and private sector, and media coverage in Dahlgren Hall.
- April 1 – President Clinton transmits the Comprehensive Child Immunization Act of 1993 to Congress in a message. President Clinton says the legislation "launches a new partnership among parents and guardians; health care providers; vaccine manufacturers; and Federal, State, and local governments to protect our Nation's children from the deadly onslaught of infectious diseases."
- April 1 – President Clinton announces the nomination of June Gibbs Brown for Inspector General of the Department of Health and Human Services.
- April 2 – President Clinton attends the opening of the Forest Conference at the Oregon Convention Center in Portland, Oregon.
- April 2 – President Clinton delivers remarks concluding the first discussion of the Forest Conference at the Oregon Convention Center in Portland.
- April 19 – The Branch Davidian Compound burns to the ground in the Waco siege, ending a morning-long assault by federal officials. Leader David Koresh and 75 other people die in the fire. In a statement, Attorney General Janet Reno takes the blame for both ordering the assault and for everybody that died in the fire.

== May ==
- May 20 – President Bill Clinton signs the National Voter Registration Act of 1993 into federal law.

== June ==
- June 14 – President Clinton nominates Ruth Bader Ginsburg to be a justice on the Supreme Court.
- June 29 – President Clinton holds his eighteenth news conference with President of Argentina Carlos Saul Menem in the East Room. President Clinton begins with an address about the democratic process in Argentina and the two leaders answer questions on Iraq, terrorism, disarmament and military action, trade agreements between United States and Latin America, Cuba, and pharmaceutical patents and farm subsidies.
- June 29 – In a message to the Senate, President Clinton transmits "the Convention on the Marking of Plastic Explosives for the Purpose of Detection with Technical Annex, done at Montreal on March 1, 1991."
- June 29 – President Clinton issues a statement on the observance of Independence Day.
- June 29 – In a statement, President Clinton states his concern with the flooding in the Midwest and has "directed the Federal Emergency Management Agency to keep me fully informed of their activities on behalf of the affected States."
- June 29 – President Clinton announces the nomination of Reed E. Hundt for membership on the Federal Communications Commission.
- June 30 – President Clinton answers questions from reporters on nuclear testing, and the national and international economy in the Cabinet Room.
- June 30 – President Clinton transmits a report on further sanctions against Haiti in a message to Congress.
- June 30 – In a message to Congress, President Clinton transmits a "report on the Nation's achievements in aeronautics and space during fiscal year 1992, as required under section 206 of the National Aeronautics and Space Act of 1958, as amended (42 U.S.C. 2476)."
- June 30 – In a letter to television networks, President Clinton applauds "the action taken today by CBS and by the other major broadcast networks to begin addressing the problem of violence on television."
- June 30 – President Clinton announces his nominations of William Gilmartin for Assistant Secretary of Housing and Urban Development for Congressional and Intergovernmental Relations, Eugene Brickhouse for Assistant Secretary of Veterans Affairs for Human Resources and Administration, and Ginger Lew for General Counsel of the Department of Commerce.

== July ==
- July 19 – U.S. President Bill Clinton announces his 'Don't ask, don't tell' policy regarding homosexuals serving in the American military.
- July 20 – White House deputy counsel Vince Foster dies by suicide in Virginia.

== August ==
- August 2 – President Clinton answers questions from reporters on Bosnia and the economic program in the Roosevelt Room.
- August 3 – By a 96 to 3 vote, Ruth Bader Ginsburg is confirmed to Supreme Court by the United States Senate.
- August 10 – While President Clinton looks on, Ginsburg takes her oath of office.
- August 10 - Clinton signs the Omnibus Budget Reconciliation Act of 1993. The law raised the top income tax rate from 31% to 39%. It also raised gasoline taxes and a wide range of other taxes.
- August 19 – In a statement, President Clinton announces "that William Daley has agreed to serve as Chairman of the administration's Task Force on the North American Free Trade Agreement" and makes note of the continuing debate on NAFTA while promoting the latter agreement as "a force for job creation, environmental cleanup, greater American competitiveness, and higher labor standards."
- August 19 – In a statement, President Clinton confirms he received the report of the National Commission to ensure the strengthening of the airline industry and tasks his administration and Congress with needing to "take the next steps to ensure that Government policy encourages a prosperous airline industry."
- August 19 – In a statement, President Clinton says David Wilhelm "has made a superb choice" in selecting Richard Celeste to chair the Democratic National Health Care Campaign.
- August 19 – President Clinton issues a memorandum to department and agency leadership informing them "that Secretary of Commerce Ronald H. Brown has agreed to serve as the chair of the 1993 Combined Federal Campaign of the National Capital Area" and requesting support for Brown by having each secretary personally chair the campaign in their agency and appoint a top official as vice chairman.
- August 19 – In a letter to House Speaker Foley and Senate Foreign Relations Committee Chairman Claiborne Pell, President Clinton reports "on progress toward a negotiated settlement of the Cyprus question."
- August 19 – In a letter to House Speaker Foley and Senate President Gore, President Clinton reports on the history of chemical weapons under the Bush administration and continuing into his own.
- August 21 – A recording of President Clinton discussing his intent to send "a health care plan to Congress that offers hope for all Americans who want to work and take responsibility and create opportunities for themselves and their children" and the benefits its principles of "security, savings, and simplicity" is broadcast on the radio.
- August 27 – President Clinton announces the nomination of Thomas A. Loftus to be United States Ambassador to Norway.
- August 28 – A recording of President Clinton discussing the thirtieth anniversary of the 1963 March on Washington for Jobs and Freedom and the "I Have a Dream" speech by Martin Luther King Jr., as well as domestic issues that have improved under his administration, is broadcast.
- August 28 – In a statement, President Clinton notes the thirtieth anniversary of the March on Washington and Americans continuing to be "guided by that vision of economic empowerment."
- August 29 – President Clinton delivers remarks on the reception he has received during his time at Martha's Vineyard prior to departing from Martha's Vineyard Airport.
- August 30 – President Clinton attends a White House Interfaith Breakfast in the State Dining Room.
- August 30 – President Clinton addresses administration efforts toward Hurricane Emily and answers questions from reporters on peace talks in the Middle East, NAFTA, and Hurricane Emily in the Roosevelt Room.
- August 30 – President Clinton holds his twenty-fourth news conference in the East Room with President of Guyana Cheddi Jagan, Prime Minister of Barbados Erskine Sandiford, Prime Minister of Trinidad and Tobago Patrick Manning, Prime Minister of Jamaica P.J. Patterson, and Prime Minister of the Bahamas Hubert Ingraham, beginning an address on American relations with Mexico and the Caribbean and answering questions from reporters on NAFTA, Cuba, Bosnia, Somalia, and relations between the United States and the Caribbean.
- August 30 – President Clinton reiterates American wishes for "democracy and an open economy" in Cuba when asked about what conditions would end the American embargo on the country by a reporter in the Blue Room.
- August 30 – President Clinton answers questions from reporters on defense and Somalia while in the Cabinet Room.
- August 31 – President Clinton attends the Summer of Service Forum in the Adele H. Stamp Student Union at the University of Maryland in College Park, Maryland.
- August 31 – President Clinton announces the nomination of Dr. Michael Trujillo for Director of the Indian Health Service within the Department of Health and Human Services.
- August 31 – President Clinton announces the nominations of Michael Dunn for Administrator of the Farmers Home Administration, H. Allen Holmes for Assistant Secretary for Special Operations and Low-Intensity Conflict, J. Davitt McAteer for Assistant Secretary for Mine Safety and Health, Preston Taylor, Jr. for Assistant Secretary for Veterans Employment and Training, Kathy Jurado for Assistant Secretary for Public and Intergovernmental Affairs, and Mark Schneider for Assistant Administrator for Latin America and the Caribbean.

== September ==
- September 13 – PLO leader Yasser Arafat and Israeli prime minister Yitzhak Rabin shake hands in Washington D.C., after signing a peace accord.

== October ==
- October 1 – President Clinton states his intent to have a "free-flowing conversation about NAFTA" with members of Congress and answers a question on the attempts toward obtaining peace in the Middle East in the Roosevelt Room during the morning.
- October 1 – President Clinton delivers remarks on his meeting with Royal Highness Crown Prince Hassan of Jordan and Foreign Minister Shimon Peres of Israel and activities toward achieving peace in the Middle East on the South Lawn during the afternoon.
- October 1 – President Clinton transmits the Strengthening America's Shipyards: A Plan for Competing in the International Market report to Congress in a message.
- October 1 – In a statement, President Clinton states his directing of the federal government to provide aid to India in response to earthquakes.
- October 2 – President Clinton delivers an Oval Office address on the subject of health care reform during the morning. President Clinton touts a proposal by the administration and outlines its effects.
- October 3 – In a noon South Lawn appearance, President Clinton addresses the violence in Moscow, Russia and reaffirms American support for democracy: "I still am convinced that the United States must support President Yeltsin and the process of bringing about free and fair elections."
- October 20 – President Clinton attends the NAFTA Jobs and Products Day Trade Fair on the South Lawn.
- October 20 – In a statement, President Clinton said it was time for the federal government "to set an example and provide real leadership that will help create jobs and protect the environment, encouraging new markets for recycled products and new technologies."
- October 20 – In a letter to Senate Majority Leader Mitchell and Senate Republican Leader Bob Dole, President Clinton addresses the conflict in Bosnia and lists several initiatives being undertaken by the administration in response.
- October 20 – President Clinton announces the appointment of seven administration officials to be Government members of the Board of Governors of the American Red Cross.
- October 20 – In a letter to House Speaker Foley and President pro tempore of the Senate Robert C. Byrd, President Clinton addresses his directing of "the deployment of U.S. Naval Forces to participate in the implementation of the petroleum and arms embargo of Haiti."
- October 21 – President Clinton addresses the Conference of Business for Social Responsibility at the Grand Hyatt Washington Hotel.
- October 21 – President Clinton answers questions from reporters on health care legislation, confirming that it has been drafted and been through a series of revisions as a result of officials consulting among each other, at the Grand Hyatt Washington Hotel.
- October 21 – President Clinton attends the Executive Leadership Council Dinner in the Sheraton North Ballroom at the Sheraton Washington Hotel.
- October 21 – President Clinton attends the Democratic National Committee Dinner at the National Museum of Women in the Arts.
- October 21 – In a message to Congress, President Clinton submits an Agreement between the Government of the United States of America and the Government of the Republic of Poland Extending the Agreement of August 1, 1985.
- October 21 – In a message to the Senate, President Clinton transmits "the Convention Between the United States of America and the Slovak Republic for the Avoidance of Double Taxation and the Prevention of Fiscal Evasion with Respect to Taxes on Income and Capital" for its advice and consent.
- October 21 – In a message to the Senate, President Clinton transmits "the Convention Between the United States of America and the Czech Republic for the Avoidance of Double Taxation and the Prevention of Fiscal Evasion with Respect to Taxes on Income and Capital" for its advice and consent.
- October 21 – President Clinton signs the Agriculture, Rural Development, Food and Drug Administration, and Related Agencies Appropriations Act, 1994 into law. President Clinton says the legislation "makes a significant shift in priorities by funding $745 million of my investment proposals, including full funding of the investment proposals for the Food Safety and Inspection initiative and for the Food and Drug Administration."
- October 21 – President Clinton signs the Labor, Health and Human Services, and Education, and Related Agencies Appropriations Act, 1994 into law. President Clinton says the legislation "provides funding for the Departments of Labor, Health and Human Services, and Education, the Corporation for Public Broadcasting, and several smaller agencies."
- October 21 – President Clinton signs H.J. Res. 281 into law, the continuing resolution funding "the operations of the Federal Government during October 22–28, 1993."
- October 26 – President Clinton announces the nominations of Sandra L. Vogelgesang for Ambassador to the Kingdom of Nepal and Nelson F. Sievering, Jr. for U.S. Representative to the International Atomic Energy Agency, and the appointment of Arvonne S. Fraser as U.S. Representative to the United Nations Commission on the Status of Women.
- October 26 – President Clinton announces the nomination of Norman E. D'Amours for the Board of Directors of the National Credit Union Administration (NCUA).
- October 26 – President Clinton announces the nominations of Thomas A. Dine for Assistant Administrator for Europe and the Newly Independent States, and Jill B. Buckley as Assistant Administrator for Legislation and Public Affairs at the Agency for International Development.
- October 26 – President Clinton announces the nomination of Susan Esserman for the Assistant Secretary of Commerce for Import Administration.
- October 27 – President Clinton delivers remarks promoting the Health Security Act of 1993 to members of Congress in Statuary Hall at the Capitol.
- October 27 – In a letter to Speaker Foley and Senate Majority Leader Mitchell, President Clinton promotes the Health Security Act of 1993 as legislation that if enacted will strengthen the economy and add "common sense to American health care."
- October 27 – President Clinton announces the nomination of Loretta Collins Argrett for Assistant Attorney General for the Tax Division at the Department of Justice.
- October 27 – President Clinton announces the nominations of six individuals as Federal District Court Judges.
- October 27 – President Clinton signs the Departments of Commerce, Justice, and State, the Judiciary, and Related Agencies Appropriations Act, 1994 into law, providing "funding for the Departments of Commerce, Justice, and State, the Judiciary, and several smaller agencies."
- October 28 – President Clinton delivers remarks announcing actions in response to the California fires and answers a question from a reporter on Haitian President Aristide not returning to power and whether he accepts this in the Rose Garden.
- October 28 – President Clinton delivers remarks at Johns Hopkins University in Baltimore, Maryland on his past experiences with health care and the six principles he previously mentioned in his address to Congress on problems with the American health care system.
- October 28 – President Clinton attends a rally for Mayor David Dinkins at Electronic Industries Hall in New York City.
- October 28 – President Clinton delivers telephone remarks to the Queens County Democratic Dinner from Electric Industries Hall in New York City.
- October 28 – President Clinton attends the Wall Street Journal Conference on the Americas in the Empire Room at the Waldorf Astoria Hotel in New York City.
- October 28 – President Clinton signs the Departments of Veterans Affairs and Housing and Urban Development, and Independent Agencies Appropriations Act, 1994 into law. President Clinton says the legislation "provides funding for the Departments of Veterans Affairs (VA) and Housing and Urban Development and independent agencies including the Environmental Protection Agency, National Aeronautics and Space Administration, and National Science Foundation."
- October 28 – President Clinton signs the Treasury, Postal Service, and General Government Appropriations Act, 1994 into law, stating that the legislation "provides funding for the Department of the Treasury, the U.S. Postal Service, the General Services Administration, the Office of Personnel Management, the Executive Office of the President, and several smaller agencies."
- October 28 – President Clinton signs the Energy and Water Development Appropriations Act, 1994 into law, the legislation providing funding for the Department of Energy and the water resources development activities of the Army Corps of Engineers.
- October 29 – President Clinton attends the dedication of the John F. Kennedy Presidential Library and Museum at the Steven E. Smith Center in Boston, Massachusetts.
- October 29 – President Clinton addresses Gillette employees on the factory floor in Boston.
- October 29 – In a statement, President Clinton charges the Haitian police and military with defying the will of the people and calls on "President Aristide and Prime Minister Malval today to reaffirm America's commitment to finding a negotiated solution to this crisis."
- October 29 – President Clinton announces the nominations of Henry Adams and Susan Bucklew for the Middle District of Florida and Theodore Klein for the Southern District of Florida.
- October 30 – President Clinton participates in a telephone conversation on the subject of the California fires from the Oval Office.
- October 30 – President Clinton delivers a morning address on the health care crisis and his wishes for "lawmakers to pass a bill to guarantee health security for every American" in the Roosevelt Room.
- October 30 – In a statement, President Clinton states his welcoming of "the efforts of Irish Prime Minister Albert Reynolds and British Prime Minister John Major to reinvigorate the negotiations for peace in Northern Ireland" and his joining in their "condemnation of the use of violence for political ends" in addition to endorsing talks between the two governments and Northern Ireland.

== November ==
- November 17–22 – The North American Free Trade Agreement (NAFTA) passes the legislative houses in the United States, Canada and Mexico.
- November 30 – President Clinton signed the Brady Handgun Violence Prevention Act, nicknamed "Brady Act", into law at the East Room, the first gun control bill of the Clinton Presidency

== December ==
- December 1 – President Clinton announces the nominations of Robert M. Walker for Assistant Secretary of the Army for Installations, Logistics, and Environment, and Robert B. Pirie, Jr. for Assistant Secretary of the Navy for Installations and Environment. President Clinton gives a speech to the Advisory Commission in the Indian Treaty Room of the Old Executive Office Building and delivers an address in observance to Worlds AIDS Day at the Pre-Clinic Science Building at Georgetown University Medical Center during the morning. President Clinton answers questions on North Korea in the Oval Office of the White House during the afternoon.
- December 14 – President Clinton announces his appointments of Ginny Terzano for Special Assistant to the President and Deputy White House Press Secretary, and Barbara Jordan for chair of the Commission on Immigration Reform. President Clinton addresses the audiovisuals of GATT in an exchange with reporters at the Mellon Auditorium during the morning.
- December 15 – President Clinton holds a news conference in the Briefing Room during the afternoon and announces the resignation of Les Aspin as Secretary of Defense in an evening Oval Office address.
- December 18 – President Clinton addresses the global economy being composed by the North American Free Trade Agreement in a morning radio speech.
- December 20 – President Clinton announces his nomination of Rodney A. McCowan for United States Assistant Secretary of Education, and appointment of Pat Griffin to Assistant to the President for Congressional Affairs. President Clinton issues a statement favorable of the choice by the United Nations General Assembly to establish a High Commissioner for Human Rights.
- December 21 – President Clinton announces his nomination of William A. Owens for Vice Chairman of the Joint Chiefs of Staff, Jere W. Glover for Small Business Administration's Chief Counsel for Advocacy, and Thomas R. Bloom to be Chief Financial Officer and Assistant Secretary of Commerce. President Clinton attends the groundbreaking ceremony for the Pan Am Flight 103 Memorial at Arlington National Cemetery in Arlington, Virginia during the morning and delivers an address honoring UNICEF Health Heroes in the East Room during the afternoon.
- December 22 – President Clinton and Chief of Staff Thomas McLarty announce the appointment of Harold M. Ickes for Assistant to the President and Deputy Chief of Staff.
- December 23 – President Clinton announces the nomination of Arnold G. Holz for Chief Financial Officer at the National Aeronautics and Space Administration and the appointment of Patrick K. McGowan for the Small Business Administration's Regional Director for Region I.
- December 25 – President Clinton releases a statement on the death of Norman Vincent Peale. A recording of President Clinton speaking about Christmas is released.
- December 28 – President Clinton releases a statement in support of the nomination of Strobe Talbott for United States Deputy Secretary of State. The Office of the Press Secretary releases a memorandum of President Clinton's on the subject of NAFTA.
- December 29 – President Clinton issues a statement on Kwanzaa.

== See also ==
- Timeline of the Bill Clinton presidency, for an index of the Clinton presidency timeline articles

U.S. presidential administration timelines
| Preceded by Bush presidency (1992–1993) | Clinton presidency (1993) | Succeeded by Clinton presidency (1994) |
