= Timeline of the Bill Clinton presidency (1995) =

The following is a timeline of the presidency of Bill Clinton, from January 1, 1995 to December 31, 1995.

== January ==
- January 2 – Bill Clinton arrived in Little Rock, Arkansas and delivers remarks at Adams Field during the afternoon.
- January 2 – Clinton released a statement on actions being undertaken by the administration to combat anti-abortion violence against abortion clinics.
- January 3 – Clinton answered questions from reporters on his recent activities at the Robinson farm during the morning.
- January 4 – Clinton attended the dedication of the William Jefferson Clinton Elementary Magnet School in Sherwood during the morning.
- January 5 – Clinton delivered remarks on the intent of the administration to work with Congress on various legislative issues in the Cabinet Room during the morning.
- January 5 – Clinton delivered remarks at a press conference for Michael D. McCurry during an afternoon appearance in the Briefing Room.
- January 6 – Clinton delivered an address on the economy in the Oval Office during the morning. He touts that the economy produced by his administration over the past two years has produced "5.6 million new jobs."
- January 10 – Clinton delivered an address at Galesburg High School on the economy and crime bill during the afternoon.
- January 11 – Clinton held his eighty-fourth news conference with Prime Minister of Japan Tomiichi Murayama in the Grand Foyer during the afternoon, answering questions from reporters on trade between the US and Japan, commemorations of World War II, Mexico, North Korea, and security arrangements between Japan and the US.
- January 11 – Clinton released a statement on the economic situation in Mexico in which he calls on "the international financial institutions to work quickly to put in place a substantial lending program to support Mexico's economic program."
- January 12 – Clinton released a statement on the Democratic National Committee in which he states his intent to work on reforming the DNC to return to "the important business of electing Democrats at all levels of government, and assuring that the voices of the people who work hard and play by the rules--our constituents--are heard and heeded at the seats of government throughout our land."
- January 13 – Clinton attended the White House Conference on Trade and Investment in Central and Eastern Europe in the Grand Ballroom at the Stouffer Renaissance Hotel in Cleveland, Ohio during the morning.
- January 13 – Clinton announced the sending of "$10 million from the disaster relief fund" to California to aid with the removal of debris and bettering the health of denizens of the state.
- January 16 – Clinton delivered an address on Martin Luther King Jr., in recognition of it being the federal holiday named after him, in the Amphitheater in Denver, Colorado during the afternoon.
- January 17 – Clinton delivered an address in the Northridge Oviatt Library at California State University, Northridge during the morning.
- January 17 – Clinton gave remarks at the corner of Tina Way and Elisa Way in Roseville, California during the afternoon.
- January 19 – Clinton signed the Retirement Protection Act of 1994 in the Roosevelt Room during the afternoon. Clinton said the legislation will cause the "funding level of large, underfunded pension plans will be increased dramatically so that the benefits can be paid as they were promised."
- January 21 – Clinton addressed the Democratic National Committee at the Hilton Hotel and Towers during the afternoon.
- January 23 – Clinton signed the Congressional Accountability Act of 1995 in the Oval Office during the morning. Clinton said the legislation "guarantees that the cafeteria workers and the police who work in Congress and who help millions of tourists every year will have the same rights as all Americans do to a safe environment, to collective bargaining, to civil rights protection."
- January 24 – Clinton delivered his annual State of the Union Address before a joint session of Congress.
- January 27 – Clinton attended the U.S. Conference of Mayors in Room 450 of the Old Executive Office Building during the afternoon.
- January 28 – Clinton delivered an address concerning welfare reform in the South Portico during the morning advocating that the reform be carried out through the requirement of "work and responsibility".
- January 29 – Clinton attended the National Governors' Association Dinner in the State Dining Room during the evening.
- January 30 – Clinton addressed the National Governors' Association during a morning appearance in the East Room.
- January 30 – Clinton delivered an address to the National Association of Home Builders via satellite from Room 459 of the Old Executive Office Building during the afternoon.
- January 31 – Clinton released a statement in response to the Algeria terrorist attack the previous day condemning the act and stating "our profound hope that reason and dialog can transcend violence and hate and that a better future can be realized for all the people of Algeria."

== February ==
- February 1 – Clinton answered questions from reporters on the defense budget, the baseball strike, and Mexican loan guarantees at the Pentagon during the morning.
- February 2 – Clinton attended the National Prayer Breakfast at the Washington Hilton Hotel during the morning.
- February 2 – Clinton announced the nomination of Henry W. Foster, Jr. for Surgeon General of the United States and addresses the subjects of teen pregnancy, deficit reduction, China, and the baseball strike during the afternoon in the Oval Office.
- February 2 – In a statement, Clinton stated his approval of "Secretary of the Navy John Dalton's recommendation to name CVN-75 and CVN-76, Nimitz-class aircraft carriers currently authorized for construction, the U.S.S. Harry S. Truman and U.S.S. Ronald Reagan, respectively."
- February 3 – Clinton delivered an address on the minimum wage in the Rose Garden during the morning. Clinton touts the economic recovery the US has undergone since his tenure began and states the plans of the administration to combat continued disparity.
- February 4 – A recording of Clinton from the previous day was broadcast on the radio. Clinton addressed the economic reports the first two years of his tenure and discusses wages.
- February 6 – Clinton delivered an address on the 1996 federal budget in Room 450 of the Old Executive Office Building during the morning.
- February 7 – Clinton stated his actions in relation to the Immigration Policy Initiative in the Roosevelt Room during the morning.
- February 8 – Clinton announced the Community Policing Grants in Room 450 of the Old Executive Office Building during the morning.
- February 9 – Clinton held his eighty-fifth news conference with Chancellor of Germany Helmut Kohl in Room 450 of the Old Executive Office Building during the afternoon. Reporters pose questions on Surgeon General Nominee Foster, Russia, welfare reform, Mexican loan guarantees, Bosnia, North Korea, the World Bank, terrorism, and German exports to Iran.
- February 9 – Clinton attended a dinner in honor of Chancellor Kohl in the State Dining Room during the evening.
- February 9 – Clinton transmitted the Omnibus Counterterrorism Act of 1995 to Congress for "immediate consideration and enactment" in a message.
- February 10 – Argentina ascended to the Nuclear Non-Proliferation Treaty. Clinton released a statement praising the choice and the country's current leadership.
- February 11 – Clinton delivered a radio address from the Oval Office during the morning on the subject of the law and the handling of the issue by the administration and Congress.
- February 12 – Clinton met with Middle Eastern leaders at the Blair House during the afternoon for discussions on forwarding a peace agreement.
- February 13 – A recording of Clinton was released in which he addresses the denizens of Burundi and affirms the US's commitment to "stand with those who are against violence and for tolerance and peace."
- February 22 – Clinton addressed the Business Council at the Park Hyatt Hotel during the evening.
- February 23 – Clinton delivered remarks at a luncheon in the governor general's residence during the afternoon.
- February 23 – Clinton attended the Gala Dinner in the Grand Hall at the Museum of Civilization during the evening.
- February 24 – Clinton spoke favorably on the health of Secretary of State Christopher and says he will come home with the other American officials including himself in Ottawa during a morning appearance at Parliament.
- February 25 – Clinton delivered a morning Oval Office address on reducing the deficit and citing the benefits of the adopting the Balanced Budget Amendment.
- February 26 – In a statement, Clinton expressed his satisfaction with the trade agreement between China and the United States and touts its benefits to America.
- February 27 – Clinton delivered an address to American Red Cross on the lawn of the Red Cross headquarters during the morning.
- February 28 – Clinton held his eighty-seventh news conference with Prime Minister of the Netherlands Wim Kok in Cross Hall at the White House during the afternoon. Reporters pose questions on Iran, the Balanced Budget Amendment, United Nations Peacekeeping, Iraq, the Apache helicopter, Bosnia and Croatia, and foreign policy.

== March ==
- March 1 – In a statement, Clinton stated his satisfaction with the USDA presenting the Food Stamp Program Antifraud Initiative and says the initiative will restore consumer confidence in the Food Stamp Program.
- March 1 – Clinton transmitted the twenty-seventh annual report on the Department of Transportation to Congress in a message.
- March 1 – Clinton addressed the Nixon Center for Peace and Freedom Policy Conference at the Mayflower Hotel during the evening.
- March 2 – Clinton delivered a Briefing Room address on the Balanced Budget Amendment not passing in the Senate during the afternoon. Clinton stated the Balanced Budget Amendment "has been defeated because Republicans could not provide enough Democratic Senators with the simple guarantee that Social Security would be protected in any balanced budget amendment procedures."
- March 3 – Clinton addressed the National Public Radio Reception in the East Room as part of a commemoration of the twenty-fifth anniversary of the NPR during the evening. Clinton noted the 1962 Nobel Prize winners visit hosted by his predecessor John F. Kennedy.
- March 3 – Clinton issued a statement on the death of Howard W. Hunter lauding his leadership.
- March 4 – In a morning address from the Oval Office, Clinton discussed the role of government in contemporary society and states his concern that the Republican members of Congress "are willing to sacrifice our children's safety and our ability to learn in secure environments to pay for these tax cuts for upper income Americans."
- March 4 – Clinton released a memorandum on regulatory reform to department heads with four steps.
- March 6 – Clinton delivered an address to the Veterans of Foreign Wars Conference at the Sheraton Washington Hotel during the morning.
- March 6 – In a statement, Clinton noted that the previous day marked the twenty-fifth anniversary of the Nuclear Non-Proliferation Treaty and stated that the US was committed to hearing out potential extensions of the NPT without conditions.
- March 6 – Clinton transmitted " A Unified National Program for Floodplain Management" to Congress in a message recommending "four national goals with supporting objectives for improving the implementation of floodplain management at all levels of government."
- March 7 – Clinton addressed the National Association of Counties at the Washington Hilton Hotel during the evening. The speech focuses on combating teen pregnancy and implementing welfare reform with bipartisan support from Congress.
- March 8 – In a statement, Clinton condemns the attack on American personnel in Pakistan and states his actions relating to addressing the assault.
- March 8 – Clinton released a statement commemorating Saint Patrick's Day on the history surrounding the holiday.
- March 8 – Clinton transmitted the 1993 annual report on the Administration of the Federal Railroad Safety Act of 1970 to Congress in a message.
- March 8 – Clinton transmitted the 1994 annual report on the Federal Council on the Aging to Congress in a message.
- March 9 – Clinton delivered an address at Patrick Henry Elementary School in the school cafeteria during the afternoon.
- March 9 – Clinton sent a message to Congress on American nuclear cooperation with the European Atomic Energy Community reflecting on the history of relations as well as his own actions since entering office relating to the subject.
- March 9 – Clinton addressed American involvement with Mexico amid the latter country's financial crisis in a message to Congress.
- March 10 – In a morning Briefing Room appearance, Clinton spoke on the economic strategy being enacted by the administration and states various changes that have occurred within the economy since the beginning of his tenure.
- March 11 – In a morning Oval Office address, Clinton addressed the economy and touts the contemporary one as having "the lowest combined rate of unemployment and inflation in 25 years."
- March 11 – In a statement, Clinton said that he has accepted the withdrawal of Michael Carns from his nomination as CIA Director and subsequently announces the nomination of United States Deputy Secretary of Defense John Deutch for the same position.
- March 12 – Clinton declared a major disaster exists in California and orders federal aid as well as offering the thoughts and prayers of First Lady Hillary Clinton and himself.
- March 13 – Clinton delivered a speech to the national champion Nebraska Cornhuskers football team on the South Lawn during the morning.
- March 13 – Clinton addressed the National League of Cities at the Washington Hilton Hotel during the afternoon.
- March 14 – Clinton delivered an address to the National PTA Legislative Conference at the Washington Renaissance Hotel during the morning.
- March 14 – Clinton announced the nomination of Charles C. Krulak for appointment as Commandant of the Marine Corps.
- March 14 – In a statement, Clinton praised the tenure of Secretary of Housing and Urban Development Henry Cisneros and states his confidence in him despite "any mistakes he has made."
- March 14 – Clinton attended the Radio and Television Correspondents Association Dinner at the Washington Hilton during the evening.
- March 15 – Clinton attended the welcoming ceremony for Hassan II of Morocco on the South Lawn during the morning.
- March 15 – Clinton held his eighty-ninth news conference in the Rose Garden with Hassan II in the Rose Garden during the afternoon. Questions are posed by reporters regarding the Middle East, North Africa, and Egypt.
- March 15 – Clinton attended a dinner honoring Hassan II in the State Dining Room during the evening.
- March 15 – Clinton sent a message to Congress regarding his decision to prohibit transactions relating to the development of Iranian petroleum resources.
- March 16 – Clinton delivered an address on regulatory reform at Custom Print, Inc in Arlington, Virginia during the morning.
- March 16 – Clinton delivered an address to the National Conference of State Legislatures at the Hyatt Regency Hotel during the afternoon.
- March 17 – Clinton attended a ceremony for Saint Patrick's Day with Prime Minister of Ireland John Bruton in the Roosevelt Room during the morning.
- March 17 – Clinton issued a memorandum on federal employees impacted by the floods in California.
- March 17 – Clinton delivered an address to the 1994 National Hockey League Champion New York Rangers in the Rose Garden during the afternoon.
- March 17 – During the evening, Clinton attended a reception for Saint Patrick's Day in the East Room.
- March 18 – A recorded address of Clinton speaking on welfare reform was broadcast on the radio. The remarks were recorded in the Roosevelt Room the previous day.
- March 20 – In a statement, Clinton urges the Senate to pass line-item veto legislation and cites it as essential to cutting the deficit.
- March 21 – In an afternoon East Room appearance, Clinton delivered remarks in which he announces the appointment of Bonnie Campbell as Director of the Office of Violence Against Women.
- March 21 – Clinton transmitted the annual report on the National Science Foundation for Fiscal Year 1993 in a message to Congress.
- March 21 – In a message to Congress, Clinton reports on export control regulations.
- March 22 – Clinton signed the Unfunded Mandates Reform Act of 1995 into law during an afternoon appearance in the Rose Garden. Clinton said the legislation requires "Congress to show how much mandates over $50 million per year will cost State and local governments, to require Congress to identify a specific funding source for these mandates, and if it does not meet these criteria, Congress must explicitly waive the requirement that there be no unfunded mandate".

== April ==
- April 1 – Clinton delivered a radio address from the Gibbs Magnet School for International Studies in Little Rock, Arkansas in which he discusses education reform during the morning.
- April 2 – Clinton released a statement on the Major League Baseball Strike settlement expressing satisfaction with the dispute being resolved but noting underlying issues that have yet to be concluded and calling on such issues to end.
- April 3 – Clinton attended the dedication of the Dean B. Ellis Library at Arkansas State University during the morning.
- April 3 – Clinton sent Congress the 1994 annual report on the mineral resources of Alaska in a message.
- April 4 – In a statement, Clinton addressed the buyout program for federal government employees, referring to it as a success that had "help us cut the work force in a fiscally responsible and humane way."
- April 8 – Clinton delivered an address to the California Democratic Party at the Convention Center during the morning.
- April 9 – Clinton attended the United Jewish Fund Luncheon at the Beverly Wilshire Regent during the afternoon.
- April 10 – Clinton signed H.R. 889 into law, establishing "emergency supplemental appropriations and rescissions to preserve and enhance the military readiness of the Department of Defense for the fiscal year ending September 30, 1995, and for other purposes."
- April 11 – Clinton held his ninety-second news conference in the Cross Hall with Prime Minister of Pakistan Benazir Bhutto during the afternoon. Questions are posed by reporters on the subjects of Pressler Amendment, Kashmir, nuclear non-proliferation, self-employed health insurance legislation, and relations between the US and Pakistan.
- April 11 – Clinton signed the Self-Employed Health Insurance Act into law. In an accompanying statement, Clinton said the legislation "extends permanently the tax deductibility of health insurance premiums for the self-employed and their dependents."
- April 12 – Clinton arrived in Fort Benning, Georgia shortly before noon; he delivers an address at Lawson Army Air Field.
- April 12 – Clinton delivered an address in acknowledgement of the fiftieth anniversary of the death of U.S. president Franklin D. Roosevelt at the Remembering Franklin D. Roosevelt commemorative service at the little White House during the afternoon.
- April 15 – A recording of Clinton discussing his three priorities of welfare reform, cuts in tax and spending, and building on the crime bill of the previous year was broadcast on the radio. The remarks were recorded two days prior.
- ‌April 19 – A truck bomb was detonated at the Alfred P. Murrah federal building in Oklahoma City, killing 168 people and injuring hundreds more. The blast was set off by anti-government militant Timothy McVeigh and his co-conspirator Terry Nichols. Clinton responds to the bombing in a Briefing Room address that afternoon, denouncing the act and stating his activities to combat its aftermath.
- April 20 – Clinton issued a memorandum directing the federal employees within the Oklahoma City area to be excused from work with pay and outlines efforts on the part of the federal government to respond to the bombing.
- April 20 – Clinton attended a state dinner for President of Brazil Fernando Cardoso in the State Dining Room during the evening.
- April 21 – Clinton released a statement in response to the announced retirement from the U.S. Senate of David Pryor in which he praises Pryor and states his interest in seeing his subsequent activities of service.
- April 22 – President and his wife delivered remarks directed toward children in response to the Oklahoma City bombing from the Oval Office during the morning.
- April 23 – Clinton attended a memorial service for the victims of the Oklahoma City bombing at the Oklahoma State Fair Arena during the afternoon.
- April 23 – Clinton released a statement on the sixtieth anniversary of the Armenian genocide reflecting on the massacre and calling "upon all people to work to prevent future acts of such inhumanity."
- April 24 – Clinton arrived in Des Moines, Iowa and delivers remarks at the Des Moines International Airport during the afternoon.

== May ==
- May 1 – Clinton attended the Women Voters Project Kickoff Luncheon in the Grand Ballroom at the Washington Hilton during the afternoon.
- May 1 – Clinton addressed participants in the I Have a Future Program in the Roosevelt Room.
- May 1 – Clinton presented the 1994 Commander in Chief Trophy to the United States Air Force Academy football team during an evening appearance in the Roosevelt Room.
- May 1 – Clinton released a statement observing Cinco de Mayo reflecting on the history of the holiday and extending the "best wishes" of his wife and himself.
- May 2 – Clinton transmitted "three rescission proposals" to Congress in a message.
- May 3 – Clinton attended the White House Conference on Aging at the Washington Hilton during the morning. Clinton addressed senior citizens and the persisting effects of Medicare and Medicaid in the contemporary economy.
- May 3 – In a statement, Clinton said initiatives to combat fraud in Medicaid and Medicare would regulate the programs to better them for senior citizens and other "people who deserve them."
- May 3 – Clinton transmitted the Immigration Enforcement Improvements Act of 1995 to Congress in a message that concurrently advocates for its enactment with an outline on changes to be made with the legislation being passed.
- May 3 – Clinton transmitted the Antiterrorism Amendments Act of 1995 to Congress in a message outlining the changes to be made in the event that the legislation was passed and touts it as being part of the administration's effort to fight against "domestic and international terrorism."
- May 4 – Clinton delivered an address to the American Jewish Committee at the Grand Hyatt Hotel during the evening.
- May 4 – In a statement, Clinton said he will veto the proposed legal reform legislation in the Senate should it come to him as presently written and encourages a version that balances "the interests of consumers with those of manufacturers and sellers."
- May 5 – Clinton attended the commencement ceremony for Michigan State University in Spartan Stadium during the afternoon.
- May 5 – Clinton announced the nomination of John Carlin for Archivist of the United States.
- May 5 – In a statement, Clinton said the following week will see him "submit legislation to Congress that will put the gun-free school zones act on firm constitutional ground."
- May 7 – Clinton addressed the American Israel Public Affairs Committee Policy Conference at the Sheraton Washington during the evening.
- May 8 – Clinton delivered a speech commemorating the fiftieth anniversary of Victory in Europe Day during a morning appearance at Fort Myer.
- May 8 – Clinton delivered remarks on the anti-terrorism legislation backed by the administration and touts it as advancing the US amid advancements made on the part of terrorists in the afternoon.
- May 8 – Clinton released a statement on the welfare reform program being undertaken in Delaware.
- May 9 – Clinton attended the dedication ceremony for the Central Museum for the Great Patriotic War at the Poklonnaya Gora Monument during the afternoon.
- May 9 – Clinton expressed his satisfaction with John Deutch being confirmed for CIA Director by the Senate.
- May 9 – Clinton attended a state dinner in the palace of Congresses at the Kremlin during the afternoon.
- May 25 – Clinton attended the reception for the White House Conference on Trade and Investment in Ireland on the South Grounds during the evening.
- May 25 – Clinton submitted his second annual report on the state of small business to Congress in a message.
- May 27 – A recording of Clinton discussing the response to the Oklahoma City bombing in the five weeks since it occurred and his willingness to work with Congress to compose anti-terrorism legislation was broadcast on the radio. The comments were recorded the previous day.
- May 29 – Clinton attended an unveiling ceremony for the POW/MIA postage stamp in the South Lawn during the morning.
- May 29 – Clinton attended a ceremony commemorating Memorial Day at Arlington National Cemetery during the morning.
- May 30 – Clinton delivered an address on a clean water bill at Pierce Mill during the morning. Clinton charges House members with having composed "a bill that would roll back a quarter-century of bipartisan progress in public health and environmental protection."
- May 31 – Clinton attended the commencement ceremony for the United States Air Force Academy at Falcon Stadium in Colorado Springs, Colorado during the morning.
- May 31 – Clinton delivered an address at Peterson Air Force Base on the flight line during the afternoon.
- May 31 – Clinton gave a speech on the economy under the administration in the Alterowitz Gymnasium during the evening.

== June ==
- June 1 – Clinton delivered a speech and answers questions from farmers and agriculture leaders at Leslie Auer farm.
- June 2 – In an afternoon Rose Garden appearance, Clinton laments the loss of an American aircraft in Bosnia.
- June 3 – Clinton delivered a morning Oval Office address on relations between the United States and Bosnia since the beginning of his tenure.
- June 5 – Clinton delivered an address on the National Homeownership Strategy in the East Room during the morning.
- June 6 – Clinton addressed the National Governors' Association Summit on Young Children at the Stouffer Renaissance Harbor Place during the afternoon.
- June 7 – Clinton delivered remarks to the Safe and Drug-Free Schools Recognition Program in the Rose Garden during the afternoon.
- June 7 – Clinton sent H.R. 1158 to the House of Representatives without his approval, reasoning that the bill does not reduce the deficit enough and charging the bill with slashing "needed investments for education, national service, and the environment, in order to avoid cutting wasteful projects and other unnecessary expenditures."
- June 7 – In a statement, Clinton praised the recommendations of the Commission on Immigration Reform as being "pro-family, pro-work, pro-naturalization."
- June 26 – Clinton praised the Supreme Court decision in the Vernonia School District v. Acton case as sending "exactly the right message to parents and students: drug use will not be tolerated in our schools."
- June 26 – Clinton transmitted the Mongolia-United States Investment Treaty in a message to the Senate.
- June 27–July 7 – The Space Shuttle Atlantis docks to the Mir space station.
- June 27 – Clinton attended the closing session of the Pacific Rim Economic Conference in Smith Memorial Center.
- June 27 – Clinton delivered a speech at Portland State University in the school courtyard during the afternoon.
- June 28 – Clinton delivered remarks on the Japan-United States Trade Agreement during an afternoon appearance in the Briefing Room.
- June 28 – Clinton sent the Senate documents on the Ukraine-United States Taxation Convention.
- June 28 – Clinton transmitted a report on the Corporation for Public Broadcasting to Congress in a message.
- June 28 – Clinton attended a fundraiser for Democratic National Committee at the Sheraton Washington Hotel during the evening.
- June 29 – Clinton delivered an address announcing community policy grants in Room 450 of the Old Executive Office Building during the morning.
- June 29 – Clinton released a statement on the observance of Independence Day.
- June 29 – In a statement, Clinton stated his distaste for the decision of the Supreme Court made toward the Georgia congressional redistricting case and calls the choice "a setback in the struggle to ensure that all Americans participate fully in the electoral process, and it threatens to undermine the promise of the Voting Rights Act."
- June 29 – Clinton released a statement expressing his satisfaction with Democrats and Republicans reaching a compromise on the rescissions bill and outlines the effects that it will occur should it be enacted.
- June 29 – Clinton submitted District of Columbia legislation to Congress in a message.
- June 29 – Clinton attended a fundraiser in the International Ballroom at the Chicago Hilton and Towers during the evening.
- June 30 – Clinton received the Abraham Lincoln Courage Award at the 15th District Police Headquarters during the morning.
- June 30 – Clinton sent Congress the Saving Law Enforcement Officers' Lives Act of 1995 in a message for consideration and passage.
- June 30 – Clinton addressed the American Association of Physicians of Indian Origin in the Sheraton Chicago during the afternoon.
- June 30 – Clinton announced the nomination of John Shalikashvili for reappointment to another two-year term as Chairman of the Joint Chiefs of Staff.
- June 30 – Clinton sent Congress a message in regards to American involvement with the Russian Federation.

== July ==
- July 1 – A recording of Clinton discussing Independence Day and reforming the welfare system was broadcast on the radio. The remarks were recorded the previous day in the Sheraton Chicago.
- July 1 – Clinton attended the opening ceremonies of the Special Olympics World Games at the Yale Bowl during the evening.
- July 6 – Clinton delivered an address at Georgetown University in Gaston Hall during the morning.
- July 6 – Clinton addressed the National Education Association via satellite during the afternoon. Clinton's remarks concern the wage gap between high school and college graduates and general education reform.
- July 17 – Clinton and his wife invited former president George H. W. Bush and Barbara Bush back to the White House for the unveiling of the latter's official White House portraits.

== August ==
- August 1 – In a statement, Clinton critiques H.R. 1555 as promoting "mergers and concentration of power" and allowing "fewer people to control greater numbers of television, radio, and newspaper outlets in every community."
- August 1 – Clinton issued a memorandum on timber salvage legislation in which he notes that the rescission bill that he signed days prior has provisions that he does not agree with though affirms that he will "carry out the objectives of the relevant timber-related activities authorized by Public Law 104-19."
- August 1 – Clinton reports on the national emergency concerning Iraq to Congress in a message.
- August 3 – Clinton delivered an address on education in the Cabinet Room and answers questions on Bosnia, Croatia, and teenage smoking.
- August 3 – In a statement, Clinton announced his support for the Work First bill in the Senate, promoting it as providing "the child care people need to move from welfare to work and to enable them to stay off welfare in the first place" and holding "State bureaucracies accountable for real results and rewards States for putting people to work, not just cutting people off."
- August 3 – In a statement on Hurricane Erin, Clinton expressed condolences to those afflicted and confirms his communications with Governor of Florida Lawton Chiles on conveying the commitment of the administration to recovery efforts.
- August 3 – In a letter to House Speaker Gingrich and Senate President Gore, Clinton reports "on the status of efforts to obtain Iraq's compliance with the resolutions adopted by the U.N. Security Council."
- August 3 – In a message to Congress, Clinton submitted the national urban policy report of the administration, entitled Empowerment: A New Covenant With America's Communities.
- August 4 – Clinton announced his use of the presidency "to bring the sunlight of full disclosure to the lobbying process in Washington" and answers questions from reporters on House Speaker Gingrich, campaign finance reform, telecommunication reform, and Bosnia and Croatia.
- August 4 – In a statement, Clinton acknowledges the upcoming thirtieth anniversary of the Voting Rights Act and states the reaffirming of assistance in protecting the electoral process by his administration.
- August 4 – In a statement, Clinton stated his disagreement with provisions of the recently signed the Emergency Supplemental Appropriations for Additional Disaster Assistance, for Anti-terrorism Initiatives, for Assistance in the Recovery from the Tragedy that Occurred at Oklahoma City, and Rescissions Act, 1995.
- August 4 – Clinton signed the District of Columbia Emergency Highway Relief Act into law, an authorization of work on construction projects. Clinton said the legislation "assists the District during its period of fiscal crisis in a very practical and important way without imposing any additional cost on the American taxpayer."
- August 4 – In a message to Congress, Clinton transmitted the District of Columbia Financial Responsibility and Management Assistance Authority's operating budget for FY 1996.
- August 4 – In a message to Congress, Clinton calls for energy policies that are in favor of "efficiency, domestic energy production, scientific and technological advances, and American exports help sustain a strong domestic economy."
- August 4 – In a message to Congress, Clinton transmitted the text of a proposed Agreement Between the Government of the United States of America and the Government of the Republic of Bulgaria for Cooperation in the Field of Peaceful Uses of Nuclear Energy.
- August 5 – Clinton delivered remarks broadcast on the radio on the subject of misuses of medical leave law against the working class and continued opposition to a position combating the misuse from the Republican majority in Congress.
- August 7 – Clinton participates in an interview with Bob Edwards and Mara Liasson of National Public Radio, answering questions on Bosnia and Croatia, teenage smoking, relief for the middle class, the upcoming presidential election, the federal budget, and China.
- August 8 – Clinton delivered remarks on environmental protection in Fort Armistead Park in Baltimore, Maryland.
- August 8 – In a statement, Clinton reflects on the Presidential conference on welfare at the Blair House six months ago and the progress made on welfare reform legislation as well as his signing of "a sweeping Executive order concerning child support collection from delinquent parents."
- August 9 – Clinton attended the Progressive National Baptist Convention at the Charlotte Convention Center in Charlotte, North Carolina.
- August 9 – Clinton participates in a discussion at the Teen Health Connection in Charlotte.
- August 9 – In a memorandum to department and agency leadership, Clinton writes that he has requested the private charity Federal Employee Education and Assistance Fund to establish the President's OKC Scholarship Fund to be used as part of its existing Oklahoma Fund and only with the intent of being part of the provision dedicated to the educational needs of children.
- August 9 – Clinton delivered remarks to the Black Enterprise Magazine 25th Anniversary Gala by satellite from the Diplomatic Reception Room at the White House.
- August 10 – In a statement, Clinton announced the assembling of "medical experts and children who have taken a pledge against smoking to talk about our common commitment to ending youth smoking" and later in the day will announce his "strategy for combating this problem based on one simple idea: We should do everything we possibly can to keep tobacco out of the hands of our young people in the United States."
- August 10 – Clinton held his one hundred and first news conference in the East Room. Clinton begins the conference with an address announcing his authorizing "the Food and Drug Administration to initiate a broad series of steps all designed to stop sales and marketing of cigarettes and smokeless tobacco to children" and answers questions from reporters on tobacco, Bosnia, teenage smoking, China, Iraq, appropriations legislation, Whitewater hearings, political reform and Ross Perot, drug cartels, airline safety, opposition from Congress, the upcoming presidential election, nuclear testing by France, welfare reform, and legislative priorities.
- August 11 – Clinton participates in an interview with Tabitha Soren, answering questions on teenage smoking, abortion, congressional opposition, his legal defense fund, Bosnia, rap music, the death of Jerry Garcia, and cigarette advertising.
- August 11 – In a Briefing Room appearance, Clinton announced his decision to negotiate a "true zero yield comprehensive test ban" that he says will see the United States "now insist on a test ban that prohibits any nuclear weapons test explosion or any other nuclear explosion" and the establishment of "concrete, specific safeguards that define the conditions under which the United States will enter into a comprehensive test ban."
- August 11 – In a statement, Clinton said a "zero yield CTBT would ban any nuclear weapon test explosion or any other nuclear explosion immediately upon entry into force" and notes that a comprehensive test ban treaty was a goal of both U.S. presidents Dwight D. Eisenhower and John F. Kennedy.
- August 11 – In a statement, Clinton announced his veto of legislation that if enacted would unilaterally lift the arms embargo against Bosnia and Herzegovina, saying the legislation "is the wrong step at the wrong time." He proceeds to list six reasons lifting the arms embargo as consequences for the United States and Bosnia.
- August 12 – Clinton delivered live remarks on the radio regarding his directing "the Food and Drug Administration to propose stiff restrictions on the advertising, marketing, and sales of cigarettes to children, after a 14-month FDA study, an exhaustive study which found tobacco addictive, harmful, and readily available to young Americans" and has former tobacco company lobbyist Victor Crawford speak afterward.
- August 13 – In a statement, Clinton reflects on the admiration felt by Americans for Mickey Mantle during the 1950s and his legacy.
- August 15 – Clinton issued a statement on the observance of Indian Independence Day.
- August 15 – In a letter to House Speaker Gingrich and Senate President Gore, Clinton spoke on the conditions that prompted him to sign Executive Order 12924.
- August 16 – In a statement, Clinton said the decision of Senator Bill Bradley to not seek re-election to a fourth term "is a loss to the people of New Jersey and all Americans."
- August 17 – In a statement, Clinton endorses his proposal for welfare reform as a "fast-track demonstration initiative" allowing state governments to build on strategies already confirmed to have allowed welfare recipients to switch to only receiving income from jobs.
- August 17 – In a letter to Senate Foreign Relations Committee Chairman Jesse Helms and ranking Democrat on the committee Claiborne Pell, Clinton sent a report on the implementation of the Partnership for Peace (PFP) initiative.
- August 19 – A recording of Clinton discussing the "progress in reducing the violent crime that has shattered the lives of too many Americans for too long" and crediting the crime bill with giving prosecutors "tough new penalties to use against violent criminals" was broadcast on the radio.
- August 19 – Clinton delivered remarks on the loss of "some fine Americans in Bosnia in a terrible accident a few hours ago" and offers condolences, answering questions from reporters on the effects the killings could have on a diplomatic solution and whether he was convinced there was no foul play involved.
- August 19 – In a statement, Clinton expressed that he was "deeply saddened by the deaths today of three dedicated Americans serving the cause of peace, near Sarajevo, Bosnia-Herzegovina."
- August 23 – Clinton attended a memorial service for the American diplomats killed in Bosnia-Herzegovina in Memorial Chapel at Fort Myer in Arlington, Virginia.
- August 24 – In a statement on the death of Alfred Eisenstadt, Clinton calls Eisenstadt "the dean of photojournalism" and "one of the most talented photojournalists of our time, has chronicled our country's history through his work."
- August 24 – In a letter to House Speaker Gingrich and Senate President Gore, Clinton transmitted "the report on the cumulative incremental cost of all United States activities in Haiti subsequent to September 30, 1993."
- August 24 – In a statement, Clinton said that he has "authorized fire suppression grants which will allow the Federal Emergency Management Agency to reimburse the State for most of the costs associated with the emergency operations" in an attempt to assist the state and federal government in the fight against fires in New York and his directing of "the mobilization of the resources of the U.S. Forest Service to provide direct assistance in fighting the fires, including all necessary equipment and teams of particular expertise in fighting wild land fires."
- August 25 – Clinton attended a ceremony at Old Faithful Lodge to commemorate the seventy-ninth anniversary of the National Park Service in Yellowstone National Park, Wyoming.
- August 26 – A recording of Clinton discussing several steps "to maintain our national heritage for our children and our grandchildren" was broadcast on the radio.
- August 26 – Clinton delivered remarks at the Jackson Lake Lodge in Jackson Hole, Wyoming on the 75th anniversary of the ratification of the Nineteenth Amendment to the United States Constitution.
- August 28 – In a statement in reference to the United States District Court for the District of Arizona striking down the Child Support Recovery Act, Clinton reflects that he "asked the Justice Department to review this case, and the Department has filed a motion asking the court to reconsider its decision."

== September ==
- September 1 – In a morning address at Wheeler Army Airfield, Clinton spoke about his enjoyment seeing those present and praises the American service members "for your service and your devotion to your country."
- September 2 – Clinton addressed the National Cemetery of the Pacific in Honolulu during the morning.
- September 2 – A recording of Clinton reflecting on World War II and speaking of a bill that he says will reduce the deficit are broadcast on the radio. The comments were recorded the previous day.
- September 2 – Clinton attended a ceremony aboard the U.S.S. Carl Vinson during the morning.
- September 3 – Clinton attended a commemorative service for World War II at the Waikiki Band Shell during the morning.
- September 4 – Clinton attended a dedication ceremony for California State University, Monterey Bay at the Campus Center around noon.
- September 4 – Clinton attended the Alameda County Labor Day Picnic at the Alameda County Fairgrounds during the afternoon.
- September 4 – In a statement, Clinton welcomes "the decision by Prime Minister Papandreou and President Gligorov to send their Foreign Ministers to New York next week to complete an agreement on steps to establish friendly relations between their two countries."
- September 5 – Clinton delivered a speech at Abraham Lincoln Middle School on education, the economy, balancing the budget, and Congress during the afternoon.
- September 5 – Clinton transmitted the Philippines-United States Extradition Treaty to the Senate in a message.
- September 6 – Clinton delivered remarks in the Cabinet Room during the morning concerning his meetings with mayors and other officials and answers questions from reporters.
- September 7 – Clinton delivered an address on the National Performance Review during a morning appearance in the Rose Garden.
- September 7 – Clinton attended a dinner for his re-election campaign in the Mayflower Hotel during the evening.
- September 8 – Clinton attended a breakfast with religious leaders in the State Dining Room during the morning.
- September 8 – In a statement, Clinton said the Bosnia-Herzegovina basic principles settlement "is an important milestone on the road to peace in the former Yugoslavia."
- September 8 – In a message to Congress, Clinton reports "one revised deferral of budgetary resources".
- September 9 – Clinton delivered an Oval Office address during the morning on welfare reform in which he denounces the current system as severely flawed and backwards in its performance while outlining his views on what its implementation should abide by.
- September 11 – In a morning appearance at Southern Illinois University in Carbondale, Illinois, Clinton delivered remarks on education and answers questions on the subject.
- September 12 – Clinton issued a memorandum on federal employees receiving career transition assistance in which he directs the heads of agencies and executive departments "to establish a program to provide career transition assistance to the agency's surplus and displaced employees."
- September 12 – In a statement, Clinton noted the first report of the Commission on Immigration Reform was in line with activities initiated by the administration and shares his principles regarding immigration reform.
- September 13 – Clinton delivered an address on the National Family Partnership at Mayfield Woods Middle School during the morning.
- September 15 – Clinton addressed Senior Citizens Organizations representatives in Room 450 of the Old Executive Office Building during the afternoon.
- September 16 – Clinton delivered an Oval Office address on welfare reform during the morning.
- September 18 – Clinton attended a fundraiser at the Wyndham Franklin Plaza Hotel in Philadelphia, Pennsylvania during the evening.
- September 18 – Clinton reports the Iran national emergency he declared in March to Congress in a message.
- September 19 – Clinton delivered an address to community members in Jacksonville, Florida at the Carvill Park Community Center during the morning.

== October ==
- October 10 – Clinton attended an evening state dinner for President of Mexico Ernesto Zedillo in the State Dining Room.
- October 10 – Clinton transmitted the Bolivia-United States Extradition Treaty to the Senate in a message.
- October 11 – Clinton delivered an address to the International Monetary Fund and the World Bank in the Grand Ballroom of the Sheraton Washington Hotel.
- October 11 – Clinton attended a luncheon in honor of President Zedillo in the Hall of the Americans at the Organization of American States.
- October 11 – Clinton sent Congress the Biennial Report on Hazardous Materials Transportation for the years of 1992 and 1993.
- October 23 – Clinton and Russian president Boris Yeltsin meet in New York to discuss improving relations between their two nations, especially with regard to the issue of nuclear arms.
- October 24 – Clinton answered questions from reporters on the subjects of the Balkan Peace Process and the American media in the Waldorf Astoria Hotel during the afternoon.
- October 25 – Clinton attended the United Jewish Appeal Reception in the Benjamin Franklin Room at the State Department during the evening.
- October 30 – Clinton attended the White House Conference on Travel and Tourism in the Grand Ballroom at the Sheraton Washington Hotel during the morning.
- October 31 – Clinton addressed the Balkan Peace Process in a speech and answers questions from reporters on debt limit legislation, and the Canadian referendum in the Roosevelt Room during the morning.

== November ==
- November 1 – Clinton signed S. 1111 into law. Clinton said the legislation will "provide enhanced protection of biotechnology process patents."
- November 2 – Clinton addressed the Community Anti-Drug Coalitions of America Forum at the J.W. Marriott Hotel during the morning.
- November 2 – In a statement, Clinton praised the vote on the 17 special interest environmental riders and criticizes the Republican budget in Congress with dismantling "vital protections that keep our Nation healthy, safe, and secure."
- November 2 – Clinton addressed the National Jewish Democratic Council at the National Museum of Women in the Arts during the evening.
- November 3 – During a morning appearance in Room 450 of the Old Executive Office Building, Clinton addressed participants of Project XL.
- November 3 – Clinton attended the dedication for the Pan American Flight 103 Memorial Cairn at Arlington National Cemetery during the afternoon.
- November 3 – Clinton signed the Fisheries Act of 1995 into law. Clinton said the legislation implements "international agreements designed to protect important fish stocks both in high seas areas of the world's oceans and off our coasts."
- November 4 – A recording of Clinton charging the Republican Congress with trying to undo environmental laws under the guise of trying to balance the budget was broadcast on the radio during the morning. The comments were recorded the previous day.
- November 4 – Prime Minister of Israel Yitzhak Rabin was shot at the end of a rally in support of the Oslo Accords. Clinton released a statement condemning the shooting and stating the hopes for Rabin's recovery on the part of Americans and himself. After Rabin dies, Clinton delivered an address on the martyred prime minister in the Rose Garden.
- November 5 – Clinton released a statement on the death of Prime Minister Rabin praising him with having given his life for Israel.
- November 5 – While taking questions from reporters aboard Air Force One, Clinton reaffirms American commitment to Israel and the peace process.

== December ==
- December 27 – In a message to Congress, Clinton outlines his actions in relation to the suspension of sanctions toward the Republic of Yugoslavia.
- December 28 – In a letter to Congress, Clinton returns the National Defense Authorization Act and states his veto was due to his belief that the bill "would restrict my Administration's ability to carry out national security policy and would substantially interfere with the implementation of key national defense programs."
- December 29 – Clinton signed the ICC Termination Act of 1995 into law. Clinton said the legislation terminates the Interstate Commerce Commission, fulfilling a goal he called upon Congress to act upon during his State of the Union address at the start of the year, and will lead to "moderate budget savings."

== See also ==
- Timeline of the Bill Clinton presidency, for an index of the Clinton presidency timeline articles

U.S. presidential administration timelines
| Preceded by Clinton presidency (1994) | Clinton presidency (1995) | Succeeded by Clinton presidency (1996) |
