= Timeline of the Bill Clinton presidency (1996) =

The following is a timeline of the presidency of Bill Clinton, from January 1, 1996, to December 31, 1996.

== January ==
- January 1 – Clinton issued a statement on the death of Arleigh A. Burke, reflecting on his dinner meeting with him the previous summer and expressing condolences to his family.
- January 2 – Speaking to reporters, Clinton stated that he hoped an agreement can be reached during the budget negotiations in the Oval Office.
- January 3 – Clinton addressed the ongoing government shutdown and its consequences on the American people in the Briefing Room.
- January 3 – Clinton sends a message to Congress on the subject of the national emergency afflicting Libya.
- January 3 – Clinton sends a message to Congress regarding the most-favored-nation trade status of Romania.
- January 23 – Clinton delivers his annual State of the Union Address before a joint session of Congress.
- January 26 – Clinton signs H.R. 2880 into law. The legislation is the ninth resolution for the 1996 fiscal year signed by the president.
- January 26 – In a statement, Clinton calls the Senate ratification of the START II Nuclear Arms Reduction Treaty an increase in "the security of the American people".
- January 26 – Clinton addressed the National Association of Hispanic Publications at the National Press Club.
- January 27 – In a morning Oval Office address, Clinton noted the tenth anniversary of the Space Shuttle Challenger disaster and details efforts made toward getting Congress to collaborate on balancing the budget.
- January 29 – Clinton announced the national campaign to reduce teen pregnancy in the Roosevelt Room.
- January 30 – During an afternoon appearance in the Oval Office, Clinton answers questions from reporters on the Gore-Chernomyrdin Commission, Russia, Chechnya, and welfare reform.
- January 30 – Clinton delivers an address on the debt ceiling and answers questions from reporters in the Cabinet Room.
- January 30 – Clinton sends a letter to Congressional leaders over the United States Air Force being in operation in close proximity to Groom Lake, Nevada.

== July ==
July 19 - Clinton declared open the 1996 Summer Olympics in Atlanta.

== September ==
‌* September 5 – Clinton delivers a speech on the education policies of his administration while on the campus of Hillsborough High School in Tampa, Florida during the morning.

- September 7 – A radio address, recorded by Clinton the prior day, is broadcast during the morning, in which Clinton calls on members of both parties in Congress to pass a treaty that "will increase the safety of our citizens at home as well as our troops in the field."
- September 8 – Clinton issued a statement on the death of Arthur Sherwood Flemming the prior day.
- September 9 – Clinton received the White House Commission on Aviation Safety and Security's initial report and speaks to reporters in the Oval Office during the morning. Clinton discussed Potomac River flood damage in the South Lawn and meets with Prime Minister of Israel Benjamin Netanyahu at the White House during the afternoon.
- September 10 – Clinton signs the District of Columbia Appropriations Act, 1997. Clinton delivers a speech to the Southern Governors' Association at the Ritz Carlton Hotel during the afternoon.

== October ==
- October 6 – Clinton and former Senator Bob Dole participate in the first presidential debate in Hartford, Connecticut. The debate moderator was Jim Lehrer of PBS.
- October 9 – Clinton signs the Federal Aviation Administration Reauthorization Act of 1996, following the death of Jessica Dubroff.
- October 16 – Clinton and former Senator Bob Dole participate in the second and final presidential debate at University of San Diego in San Diego, California in a town hall format moderated by Jim Lehrer of PBS.

== November ==
- November 5 – The 1996 United States presidential election took place. Clinton is re-elected, defeating the Republican presidential nominee Bob Dole.
- November 5 – The Republican Party retains their majorities in the House of Representatives and the Senate.

== December ==
- December 23 – Clinton issued a statement on George Joulwan retiring. The Press Secretary office released a recording of Clinton giving a Christmas greeting. Clinton delivers an address at the Goettge Memorial Fieldhouse in Camp Lejeune, North Carolina during the afternoon.
- December 28 – Clinton discussed policies being implemented for the protection of children in vehicles during his radio address recorded the previous day in the Roosevelt Room and broadcast during the morning.
- December 29 – Clinton issued a statement on the Korean Peninsula Submarine Incident Resolution.

== See also ==
- Timeline of the Bill Clinton presidency, for an index of the Clinton presidency timeline articles

U.S. presidential administration timelines
| Preceded by Clinton presidency (1995) | Clinton presidency (1996) | Succeeded by Clinton presidency (1997) |
