= Timeline of the Bill Clinton presidency (1994) =

The following is a timeline of the presidency of Bill Clinton, from January 1, 1994 to December 31, 1994.

== January ==
- January 1 – A recording of Clinton airs on the radio, featuring the president discussing a wide range of issued at the top of his administration's agenda for the new year.
- January 3 – Clinton held a meeting on health care reform. He then answers questions from reporters, during a morning appearance in the Roosevelt Room.
- January 4 – Clinton delivers an address to Central Intelligence Agency employees in the lobby of the Central Intelligence Agency in Langley, Virginia during the morning. Clinton answers questions from reporters in regards to his administration's foreign policy during an Oval Office appearance in the afternoon.
- January 5 – Clinton announced his nominations of Josiah Beeman for United States Ambassador to New Zealand and to Western Samoa, and Gordon P. Eaton for Director of the U.S. Geological Survey.
- January 6 – Clinton issued a statement on the death of Tip O'Neill.
- January 8 – Clinton issued a memorandum on American assistance for the independent states of the former Soviet Union.
- January 9 – Clinton attends the funeral of his mother, Virginia Clinton Kelley in Hope, Arkansas. Clinton delivers remarks at Grand Place in Brussels during the evening after his leaving of the Hotel de Ville. Clinton gave speech on a variety of issues at the Conrad Hotel during the evening.
- January 10 – Clinton addressed the North Atlantic Council in a speech at the NATO Headquarters during the morning. Clinton holds his thirty-ninth news conference at the Conrad Hotel during the evening, the focus of which being the Clinton administration's foreign policy.
- January 11 – Clinton delivers an address on economics within Brussels at the Conrad Hotel during the morning. Clinton holds his fortieth news conference in the Joseph Luns Theatre at NATO Headquarters during the morning. Clinton holds his forty-first news conference at the News Conference Theatre at the headquarters of the Commission of the European Union during the afternoon.
- January 13 – Clinton announced his nomination of William W. Ginsberg for Assistant Secretary for Economic Development at the Department of Commerce. Clinton announced the appointment of Regional and Deputy Regional Representatives for the U.S. Department of Education in San Francisco, Boston, Atlanta, Chicago, and Kansas City.
- January 14 – Clinton speaks with reporters in St. Catherine Hall at the Kremlin during the morning. Clinton participated in a town hall meeting with Ostankino television station during the afternoon. The United States and Russia release a joint statement on their agreement toward human rights.
- January 15 – Clinton delivers an address at the Academy of Sciences during the afternoon.
- January 16 – Clinton holds his forty-fifth news conference with President of Syria Hafez al-Assad at the Intercontinental Hotel during the afternoon.
- January 17 – Clinton issued a statement on the observance of Martin Luther King, Jr. Day. Clinton speaks with reporters on the subject of the Northridge earthquake in the Oval Office during the afternoon.
- January 19 – Clinton engaged in a discussion on the Northridge earthquake at the Hollywood-Burbank Airport during the afternoon.
- January 21 – Clinton speaks with reporters on his foreign policy in the Oval Office during the morning.
- January 22 – A recording of Clinton discussing a variety of issues airs on the radio.
- January 25 – Clinton delivers his annual State of the Union Address before a joint session of Congress.
- January 26 – Clinton announced his appointment of Gil Coronado for Deputy Assistant Secretary of Veterans Affairs for Legislative Affairs.
- January 27 – Clinton announced the nomination of ten individuals for placement on the federal bench by serving on both the U.S. Courts of Appeals and U.S. District Courts.
- January 28 – Clinton delivers an address to the National Conference of Mayors in the East Room during the afternoon. Clinton issued a statement regarding the choice made by Governor of Oregon Barbara Roberts to not seek re-election.
- January 31 – Clinton delivers an address to the National Governors Association in the East Room during the morning. Clinton gave a speech at a dinner for the Democratic Governors Association at the Omni Shoreham Hotel during the evening.

== February ==
- February 1 – Clinton delivers an address to the American Hospital Association at the Washington Hilton during the morning. Clinton announced the nomination of Deval Patrick for United States Assistant Attorney General for Civil Rights and answers questions from reporters in the Oval Office during the afternoon.
- February 12 – Clinton signs federal disaster relief for California in response to the Northridge earthquake in the Oval Office during the morning. Clinton then answers questions from reporters about American foreign policy. Clinton issued a statement announcing his distribution of "$200 million in budget authority for the Low Income Home Energy Assistance Program."
- February 14 – Clinton answers questions from reporters while in the Oval Office during the morning. Clinton holds his forty-seventh news conference on the subject of the administration's foreign policy in a joint East Room appearance with President of Kazakhstan Nursultan Nazarbayev during the afternoon.
- February 16 – Clinton delivers an address to the American Association of Retired Persons in the gymnasium at Middlesex Community College during the afternoon.

== June ==
- June 12 – Special counsel Robert B. Fiske interviews Clinton for 90 minutes and the First Lady for an hour at the White House.
- June 13 – The White House stated Clinton and First Lady Hillary Clinton were questioned under oath relating to matters of the Whitewater affair and that they both maintain their innocence while having no charges pending against them.
- June 14 – Clinton reveals a $9.3-billion reform initiative imposing a limit of two years on cash benefits as well as mandating that younger recipients find work for themselves or acquire a government job during a speech in Kansas City.

== July ==
- July 29 - The White House website, whitehouse.gov, is launched

== October ==
- October 1 – A recording of Clinton discussing the past efforts of his administration to make government respond to the American people is broadcast on the radio.
- October 1 – A recording of Clinton addressing Operation Uphold Democracy and how the troops involved are participating in an effort "to bring peace and stability to Haiti" is broadcast on the radio.
- October 3 – Clinton attends the welcoming ceremony for Crown Prince Hassan of Jordan and Israeli Foreign Affairs Minister Shimon Peres in the West Lobby at the White House.
- October 3 – At the West Wing Portico, Clinton delivers remarks to business leaders on the General Agreement on Tariffs and Trade.
- October 3 – In a statement, Clinton confirms he has accepted the resignation of United States Secretary of Agriculture Mike Espy, touting his leadership as having caused "legislation enabling USDA to reinvent its management and modernize the services it provided farmers and farm communities" to near completion in Congress.
- October 3 – In a message to Congress, Clinton reports "on developments since the last Presidential report on November 9, 1993, which have resulted in the termination of the continued blocking of Panamanian government assets."
- October 3 – In a message to Congress, Clinton transmits "the 1993 calendar year reports as prepared by the Department of Transportation on activities under the Highway Safety Act and the National Traffic and Motor Vehicle Safety Act of 1966".
- October 3 – Clinton transmits the Fifteenth Annual Report of the Federal Labor Relations Authority for Fiscal Year 1993 in a message to Congress.
- October 3 – Clinton attends a reception for California gubernatorial candidate Kathleen Brown at the Sheraton Carlton Hotel.
- October 3 – Clinton attends a victory rally for Senator Charles S. Robb at the McLean Hilton Hotel in McLean, Virginia.
- October 3 – Clinton attends a victory dinner for Senator Robb at the Sheraton Premiere in Vienna, Virginia.
- October 4 – Clinton attends the welcoming ceremony for President of South Africa Nelson Mandela on the South Lawn.
- October 4 – In a statement, Clinton stated his "continued support for efforts by Congress to restore balance to the intergovernmental partnership between the Federal Government and State, local, and tribal governments" and says the Federal Mandate Accountability and Reform Act of 1994 "will curtail the imposition of Federal mandates on State, local, and tribal governments without adequate Federal funding and will promote informed and deliberate decisions by Congress on the appropriateness of Federal requirements in any particular instances."
- October 4 – Clinton announced the nomination of Alan Dixon for Chairman of the Defense Base Closure and Realignment Commission.
- October 4 – Clinton announced the appointment of the final eight members of the President's Committee on Mental Retardation.
- October 4 – Clinton attends a state dinner for South African President Nelson Mandela in the East Room.
- October 5 – Clinton attends a luncheon by the Congressional Black Caucus for South African President Mandela in the State Dining Room.
- October 5 – In the Oval Office, Clinton says the Mandela visit has been "both a summit meeting and a celebration for so many Americans who have so strongly supported South African democracy. And now we're in the process of working on the future, planning for the future, and seeing what we can do to be of help."
- October 5 – Clinton holds his seventy-second news conference on the South Lawn with South African President Mandela, beginning the conference with an address on the contents of the discussion between the two leaders and answering questions from reporters on Haiti, trade between the United States and South Africa, and GATT.
- October 5 – Clinton signs the National Defense Authorization Act for Fiscal Year 1995 into law, stating the legislation "authorizes appropriations for Department of Defense and Department of Energy national security activities and extends and amends other programs" and "most of the Administration's major defense priorities".
- October 5 – In a statement, Clinton expressed support for the "broad bipartisan support in the Senate for final passage of the elementary and secondary education act (ESEA)" and says the support from both parties "represents a commitment to world-class standards of academic achievements for all students and to adequate preparation for every teacher" while providing aid "to the schools that need it the most and offers new flexibility to States and local communities."
- October 5 – Clinton endorsed the adopting of the Federal Mandate Relief for State and Local Government Act of 1994 by Congressman John Conyers and the House Government Operations Committee.
- October 5 – Clinton transmits a report on Vietnam sanctions in a letter to House Speaker Tom Foley and Senate President Gore.
- October 5 – Clinton announced the nomination of Christine Varney of the District of Columbia for membership on the Federal Trade Commission (FTC).
- October 5 – Clinton announced the nominations of Lacy H. Thornburg for the Western District of North Carolina, and David Folsom and Thadd Heartfield for the Eastern District of Texas.

== November ==
- November 1 – Clinton delivers remarks on the Direct Student Loan Program during a discussion on the program in the student union at the University of Michigan in Dearborn, Michigan.
- November 1 – Clinton attends a rally for Democratic candidates in the Cobo Hall Convention Center in Detroit, Michigan.
- November 1 – Clinton dismissed the Republican Party as having become "very extremist, very negative" in addition to stating his conviction that voters have seen him maintain the commitments he made during his presidential campaign amid an interview with Dominic Carter of New York 1 Television.
- November 1 – In an interview with Ken Herrera and Jayne Bower, Clinton answers questions on his approval rating, youth violence, the student loan program, and the midterm elections.
- November 1 – In an interview with Bruce Newbury of WPRO Radio, Clinton answers questions on the midterm elections, health care reform, the security of the White House, and his daughter Chelsea.
- November 1 – In an interview with Thera Martin Connelly of WDAS Radio, Clinton answers questions on the midterm elections and advocated voters back the Democrats over Republicans due to the former party delivering on promises made during prior election cycles.
- November 1 – Clinton attends a rally for Democratic candidates at the Antioch Baptist Church in Cleveland, Ohio.
- November 22 – Clinton delivers remarks welcoming President of Ukraine Leonid Kuchma on the South Lawn.
- November 22 – Clinton holds his eighty-second news conference with Ukraine President Kuchma in Room 450 of the Old Executive Office Building, answering questions on comments by Republican Senator Jesse Helms, NATO membership, Republican leaders, relations between Ukraine and the United States, and the federal budget and prayer in schools.
- November 22 – Presidents Clinton and Kuchma release a joint statement on "their shared commitment to broaden the bilateral democratic partnership into which the two countries have entered. Clinton underscored the importance the United States attached to the independence, sovereignty and territorial integrity of Ukraine" and address bilateral relations, economic cooperation, defense and security, and diplomatic endeavors.
- November 22 – In a joint statement by the United States and Ukraine, Presidents Clinton and Kuchma are said to have "underscored the important role that cooperation in civil and commercial aerospace activities can play in furthering scientific, technical and economic ties between the United States and Ukraine" and "signed an agreement on cooperation in the exploration and use of outer space for peaceful purposes that will expand joint efforts in space communications, space technology, life and microgravity sciences applications, remote sensing and earth sciences, space sciences and telecommunications."
- November 22 – Clinton attends a state dinner for President of Ukraine Leonid Kuchma in the State Dining Room.
- November 22 – In a letter to House Speaker Foley and Senate President Gore, Clinton addressed prior support for NATO efforts "to achieve peace and security in Bosnia-Herzegovina" and reports on recent developments "including the use of U.S. combat aircraft on November 21, 1994, to attack airfields and related facilities in Serb-held Croatian territory used by Serb forces to launch air strikes against the town of Bihac in Bosnia-Herzegovina."
- November 22 – North Carolina Senator Jesse Helms warns that Clinton "better watch out" in the event he tour military bases in North Carolina, citing Clinton's lack of popularity with military personnel stationed in the state's six military bases.
- November 23 – Clinton attends a ceremony for the Thanksgiving Turkey Presentation and answers a question from a reporter on what he has been grateful for over the past year in the Rose Garden.
- November 23 – Clinton reports that more progress has been made on bipartisan support for the General Agreement on Tariffs and Trade and announced "an understanding has been reached with Senator Dole to reaffirm our United States sovereignty and to make sure that the reaffirmation will be protected in the GATT process" in the Rose Garden.
- November 26 – A recording of Clinton discussing the privilege of the US in seeing "the American dreams of freedom, democracy, and peace advanced with our support in the Middle East, in Northern Ireland, in South Africa, in Haiti, and Eastern and Central Europe, full of people who are making courageous efforts to escape the shackles of the past and realize their own dreams for tomorrow" is broadcast on the radio.
- November 28 – Clinton delivers remarks on the General Agreement on Tariffs and Trade in the East Room.
- November 29 – In a statement, Clinton says "the United States House of Representatives cast an historic vote for American workers, farmers, and families" that night demonstrating "our confidence in America's ability to compete and win in the global economy."
- November 29 – In response to the Department of Education announcing its new direct lending program had reached the congressional mandate benchmark of 40 percent in new loan volume for the following academic year, Clinton says in a statement that the new direct lending program is "an important example of reinventing Government to better meet the people's needs."
- November 30 – In a letter to House Speaker Foley and Senate President Gore, Clinton reports "on the implementation of locality-based comparability payments for General Schedule employees for calendar year 1995" and his directing "the President's Pay Agent to put into effect the locality-based comparability payments shown on the enclosed table, effective in January 1995."

== December ==
- December 23 – Clinton announced the appointments of Representative Michael Synar as Chair, and Jay Alix and Babette A. Ceccotti for membership on the National Bankruptcy Review Commission. Clinton designated major disasters in both Georgia and Florida. Clinton issued a statement on Kwanzaa.
- December 24 – A recording of Clinton speaking about Christmas airs on Christmas Eve.
- December 29 – Clinton speaks to reporters on the release of Bobby Hall from North Korea in the Briefing Room during the morning.
- December 30 – Clinton released a statement condemning the Boston, Massachusetts Women's Clinics attacks.
- December 31 – Clinton released a statement on the 4-month cessation of hostilities in Bosnia agreement. A recording of Clinton celebrating New Year's Eve airs on radio.

== See also ==
- Timeline of the Bill Clinton presidency, for an index of the Clinton presidency timeline articles

U.S. presidential administration timelines
Preceded by Clinton presidency (1993)	Clinton presidency (1994)	Succeeded by Clinton presidency (1995)
