= Timeline of the Bill Clinton presidency (1997) =

The following is a timeline of the presidency of Bill Clinton from January 1, 1997, to December 31, 1997.

== January ==
- January 4 – President Clinton said he would approach his second term with a continued effort to prepare individuals for the 21st century. During a radio address, he reported a 50% increase in child support collections over the last four years.
- January 6 – President Clinton gave a speech at the Ecumenical Prayer Breakfast in the State Dining Room of the White House.
- January 9 – In a joint session of the United States Congress, the results for the Electoral College were counted. In his role as President of the Senate, Vice President Al Gore read the results and declared President Clinton the winner of the 1996 presidential election.
- January 20 – President Clinton was inaugurated for his second term.
- January 21 – President Clinton gave a speech at a Democratic National Committee meeting at the Washington Hilton and submitted a message to Congress on the continuation of Middle East terrorism.
- January 22 – President Clinton had a short exchange with reporters on the South Lawn over an explosion on 16th Street in Washington, D.C., and delivered an address at Stanley Field Middle School in Northbrook, Illinois.

== February ==
- February 4 – President Clinton delivered his annual State of the Union Address before a joint session of Congress.
- February 19 – Clinton delivered an address on the University of Massachusetts Boston campus (arranged in part by U.S. Representative Joe Moakley from Massachusetts's 9th congressional district).

== March ==
- March 3 – President Clinton submitted a message to Congress transferring the Second Supplementary Canada-United States Social Security Agreement. He held his sixth meeting with President of the Palestinian National Authority Yasser Arafat in the Oval Office in the morning and attended an East Room ceremony announcing the Coalition for America's Children during the afternoon.
- March 4 – President Clinton announced a prohibition on federal funding for human cloning during a morning appearance in the Oval Office. He proceeded to answer questions from reporters.
- March 10 – President Clinton and President of Egypt Hosni Mubarak held a joint news conference in the East Room during the afternoon. President Clinton made a statement on the decision of Senator Wendell Ford not to seek reelection to the Senate.
- March 11 – President Clinton delivered an address at the National Press Club.

== April ==
- April 10 – President Clinton spoke at the Radio and Television Correspondents' Association's annual dinner.
- April 26 – President Clinton spoke at the White House Correspondents' Dinner.

== July ==
- July 1 – President Clinton announced the Electronic Commerce Initiative in the East Room. He said his administration intended to implement the initiative by the first day of the year 2000, and issued a memorandum on electronic commerce to the leaders of executive departments and agencies. He also signed a proclamation implementing the Information Technology Agreement. He released a statement the same day stating that the agreement would "cut to zero tariffs on a vast array of computers, semiconductors, and telecommunications technology by the year 2000." He released a message online regarding the report A Framework for Global Electronic Commerce, published earlier in the day.

== September ==
- September 27 – A recording was broadcast on the radio of President Clinton discussing the Senate's continued refusal to confirm his judicial nominees and calling for the cessation of this practice so "the unbroken legacy of our strong, independent judiciary can continue for generations to come".
- September 27 – President Clinton attended the Hot Springs High School Ultimate Class Reunion on the front steps of Hot Springs High School in Hot Springs, Arkansas.
- September 27 – President Clinton attended a reception for the Arkansas State Democratic Party on Ray Winder Baseball Field in Little Rock, Arkansas.
- September 27 – President Clinton attended a candlelight vigil for the Little Rock Nine on the lawn of the Administration Building at Philander Smith College.
- September 29 – President Clinton presented the National Humanities Medals in the Rose Garden.
- September 29 – President Clinton delivered a message on the observance of National Arts and Humanities Month.
- September 29 – President Clinton delivered remarks on the Income and Poverty Report and answered questions from reporters on campaign finance reform and welfare reform in the White House Briefing Room.
- September 29 – President Clinton attended the National Arts and Humanities Medals Dinner on the State Floor of the White House.
- September 30 – President Clinton delivered remarks on the South Lawn in which he accused members of Congress of trying to undermine his administration's commitment to education reform and stated his intent to "veto any legislation that damages our commitment to public education and high national standards". He then answered questions from reporters about the Internal Revenue Service.
- September 30 – President Clinton attended a meeting of the President's Advisory Board on Race at the Mayflower Hotel.
- September 30 – President Clinton attended the retirement ceremony for General John M. Shalikashvili at Fort Myer in Arlington, Virginia.
- September 30 – President Clinton spoke about the death of Roy Lichtenstein and the latter's contributions to the alteration of art.
- September 30 – President Clinton issued a statement on the final report of the Commission on Immigration Reform, saying it "further contributes to our country's understanding of the role of immigration in the United States."
- September 30 – President Clinton issued a statement on the observance of Rosh Hashanah.
- September 30 – President Clinton signed the 1998 Military Construction Appropriations Act into law, saying it "provides funding for military construction and family housing programs of the Department of Defense" and "funds the vast majority of my request for military construction projects, the military family housing program, other quality-of-life projects for our military personnel and their families, and the base closure and realignment program."
- September 30 – In a statement, President Clinton said House Joint Resolution 94 "provides 1998 appropriations for continuing projects and activities of the Federal Government through October 23, 1997, except those funded by the Military Construction Appropriations Act, 1998, which I signed into law earlier today."
- September 30 – President Clinton issued a message to Congress on the continued national emergency in Iran.

== October ==
- October 1 – President Clinton addressed television weather broadcasters in the East Room on his desire for Americans to accept the majority scientific opinion on climate change and for the United States to commit to go to the upcoming United Nations conference in Kyoto with binding targets for reducing greenhouse gas emissions.
- October 1 – In a statement, President Clinton expressed his satisfaction with the Senate Finance Committee reporting out legislation renewing the partnership between the President and Congress in reaching trade agreements, and called for the continued breakdown of "unfair foreign trade barriers to our goods and services."
- October 2 – President Clinton announced that he would direct the Secretary of Health and Human Services and the Secretary of Agriculture "to work together in close cooperation with the agricultural community to develop the first-ever specific safety standards for the growing, processing, shipping, and selling of fruits and vegetables", and answered questions from reporters in the Rose Garden on line-item vetoes, the 2000 Census, food safety, and campaign finance during the 1996 elections.
- October 3 – In a statement, President Clinton noted a positive jobs report from the Labor Department and promoted a three-part economic strategy.
- October 3 – President Clinton issued a statement on the release of the final crime statistics for 1996 by the Federal Bureau of Investigation and called them "good news for all Americans", citing a continued drop in crime and benefits for law-abiding citizens.
- October 4 – In a live Oval Office address, President Clinton delivered remarks on the importance of the American family and the benefits given to parents as a result of the Family and Medical Leave Act.
- October 4 – A recording was broadcast of President Clinton endorsing the campaign finance reform bill of Senators John McCain and Russ Feingold, saying it would "curb the power of special interests and increase the confidence of the American people in our campaign finance system".
- October 4 – President Clinton attended a dinner for Democratic gubernatorial candidate Don Beyer in Chesapeake Hall of the National Airport Hilton Hotel in Arlington, Virginia.
- October 6 – President Clinton delivered the opening remarks at the White House Conference on Climate Change in Gaston Hall at Georgetown University.
- October 6 – During the White House Conference on Climate Change, President Clinton delivered remarks on previous congressional actions regarding the environment and said goals for emission reductions could not be reached without "a global agreement that involves both the developing and the developed countries".
- October 6 – President Clinton delivered remarks in the Oval Office on his signing of line-item vetoes of the 1998 Military Construction Appropriations Act six days prior. He also answered questions from reporters on videotapes of White House coffees, the Stand-Clark-Squillacote espionage case, and the assassination attempt against Khaled Mashal.
- October 6 – In a message to Congress, President Clinton canceled "the dollar amounts of discretionary budget authority, as specified in the attached reports".
- October 18 – President Clinton delivered remarks on the international response to climate change at Nahuel Huapi National Park in San Carlos de Bariloche, Argentina.
- October 20 – A recording was broadcast of President Clinton discussing a report by the Education Department confirming that students "who challenge themselves with rigorous math and science courses in high school are much more likely to go on to college".
- October 21 – President Clinton delivered remarks in the East Room on the America Reads initiative and education in the United States.
- October 21 – President Clinton delivered remarks to the Congressional Caucus for Women's Issues in the Mellon Auditorium at the Department of Commerce.
- October 21 – President Clinton attended a dinner for the Democratic Senatorial Campaign Committee at the Hyatt Regency Hotel.
- October 22 – President Clinton addressed the National Geographic Society in the Gilbert Grosvenor Auditorium.
- October 23 – President Clinton attended a White House Conference on Child Care in the East Room.
- October 23 – In a statement, President Clinton lamented the death of Ann Devroy and noted her accomplishments as a White House correspondent.
- October 23 – President Clinton signed House Joint Resolution 97 into law. He said the resolution provided "1998 appropriations for continuing projects and activities of the Federal Government through November 7, 1997, except those funded by the five bills that I have already signed into law."
- October 24 – President Clinton delivered remarks on the South Lawn to the National Board for Professional Teaching Standards to honor board-certified master teachers.
- October 24 – President Clinton delivered remarks to the Asia Society and the United States-China Education Foundation Board in the auditorium at the Voice of America.
- October 25 – A recording of President Clinton announcing "new FDA regulations that will ensure medical facilities, health providers, and detection equipment are all held to the highest possible standards so that every woman gets the quality care she needs when she needs it most" was broadcast on the radio.
- October 25 – President Clinton delivered remarks to the National Italian-American Foundation in the International Ballroom at the Washington Hilton.
- October 27 – President Clinton delivered remarks to the 1997 NCAA men's and women's basketball champions in the East Room.
- October 27 – President Clinton delivered remarks to the Democratic Leadership Council in the Regency Ballroom at the Omni Shoreham Hotel.
- October 27 – President Clinton signed the Departments of Veterans Affairs and Housing and Urban Development, and Independent Agencies Appropriations Act, 1998. He said the legislation would "fund vital environmental, veterans, housing, community development, space, and science programs" and provide "funding for the Departments of Veterans Affairs and Housing and Urban Development, the Environmental Protection Agency, the National Aeronautics and Space Administration, the National Science Foundation, and several other agencies."
- October 27 – President Clinton signed the Department of Transportation and Related Agencies Appropriations Act, 1998. He said the legislation "provides funds to improve safety on our highways, airways, and waterways" in addition to permitting "the highest level of Federal infrastructure investment in history—investment to improve our Nation's highways, transit systems, Amtrak, and airports and, as a result, improve personal mobility and make America a better global competitor."
- October 27 – President Clinton and First Lady Hillary Clinton attended a birthday party for the First Lady in Gar Hall at the Chicago Cultural Center.
- October 28 – President Clinton delivered remarks at Oscar Mayer Elementary School in Chicago.
- October 28 – President Clinton issued a memorandum to the Secretary of Education on the subject of low-performing public schools.
- October 28 – In a statement, President Clinton lamented the death of Walter H. Capps.
- October 29 – In a message to Congress, President Clinton transmitted a "report on the Nation's achievements in aeronautics and space during fiscal year (FY) 1996, as required under section 206 of the National Aeronautics and Space Act of 1958, as amended (42 U.S.C. 2476)."
- October 29 – President Clinton hosts President of China Jiang Zemin for a state visit.
- October 29 – In a statement, President Clinton lamented the death of American Federation of Government Employees National President John N. Sturdivant.
- October 30 – President Clinton unveiled the STARBRIGHT World On-Line Computer Network during remarks at the Children's Hospital National Medical Center.
- October 30 – President Clinton signed H.J. Res. 75, which gave Bob Hope "the status of honorary veteran of the U.S. Armed Forces and extends to him the gratitude of the American people for his lifetime of accomplishments and service on behalf of our men and women in uniform."
- October 30 – In a statement, President Clinton expressed his satisfaction with the Senate scheduling a vote on campaign finance reform. He stated that it would "pave the way for the first up-or-down vote ever on the McCain-Feingold bill."
- October 30 – In a statement, President Clinton applauded House Speaker Newt Gingrich for scheduling "a vote in the House of Representatives for next Friday, November 7, on the renewal of traditional trade negotiating authority."
- October 30 – In a message to Congress, President Clinton transmitted "the text of a proposed Agreement for Cooperation Between the Government of the United States of America and the Government of the Federative Republic of Brazil Concerning Peaceful Uses of Nuclear Energy".
- October 31 – President Clinton delivered remarks in the warehouse of the Tropical Shipping Company endorsing members of Congress' granting him the authority to enter agreements and urging their constituents to contact them in regards to the matter.
- October 31 – President Clinton delivered remarks on the athletic field of Lighthouse Elementary School in Jupiter, Florida.
- October 31 – President Clinton delivered remarks on his administration's economic policy and answered questions on education, Iran, child care, and brain development at a private residence.
- October 31 - President Clinton attended a dinner for the Democratic Congressional Campaign Committee at a private residence in Boca Raton, Florida.

== November ==
- November 21 – President Clinton signed the Food and Drug Administration Modernization Act of 1997 into law and delivered remarks on the legislation.
- November 21 – President Clinton received the Man of Peace Award in the East Room at the White House. He also issued a statement endorsing the Korean Peninsula peace process.
- November 22 – President Clinton delivered a speech at a private dinner for Senator Patty Murray and a reception for Murray at the Pavilion at the Seattle Center.
- November 23 – President Clinton issued statements on his administration's crime policy and the death of Jorge Mas Canosa.
- November 24 – President Clinton spoke to reporters about foreign policy at the Waterfront Centre Hotel in Vancouver.
- November 25 – President Clinton delivered an address to the staff of the United States Consulate in Vancouver.
- November 26 – President Clinton signed the Departments of Commerce, Justice, State, the Judiciary, and Related Agencies Appropriations Act, 1998, and the Foreign Operations, Export Financing, and Related Programs Appropriations Act, 1998. He attended the Thanksgiving Turkey Presentation Ceremony in the Rose Garden of the White House during the afternoon.
- November 29 – A recording of President Clinton speaking about Thanksgiving, American families, and legislation was broadcast on the radio.

== December ==
- December 1 – President Clinton spoke on the budget for the following year, as well as the Kyoto Protocol, in the Cabinet Room during the morning. He delivered an address at a Democratic National Committee dinner at the Renaissance Mayflower Hotel during the evening. He also issued a memorandum directing HIV prevention in federal programs within the following 90 days.
- December 2 – President Clinton announced the appointment of Togo D. West, Jr. as Acting United States Secretary of Veterans Affairs in the Roosevelt Room of the White House during the morning and signed the Amtrak Reform and Accountability Act of 1997, "the first Amtrak reauthorization since 1992 and the most comprehensive restructuring of Amtrak since the early 1980s."
- December 3 – President Clinton delivered an address on race at E.J. Thomas Performing Arts Hall at the University of Akron and participated in a discussion during the afternoon. He spoke at a reception for the Democratic Party in Chicago during the evening.
- December 4 – President Clinton lighted the National Christmas Tree on the Ellipse.
- December 5 – President Clinton spoke with reporters on his administration's foreign policy in the Oval Office during the morning. He announced appointments to the National Bipartisan Commission on the Future of Medicare in a press conference on the South Lawn in the afternoon.
- December 6 – President Clinton gave a radio address on school violence and announced an initiative "to produce for the first time an annual report card on school violence".
- December 7 – President Clinton delivered an address at the Metropolitan Baptist Church during the morning and gave a speech at the reception for the Kennedy Center Honors during the afternoon.
- December 9 – President Clinton issued statements on the death of Jeanette E. Rockefeller and the 40th anniversary of the Justice Department's Civil Rights Division. He also delivered an address commemorating the 50th anniversary of the Universal Declaration of Human Rights at the Jewish Heritage Museum.
- December 10 – President Clinton delivered an address at the Madison Square Boys and Girls Club in New York City during the morning. He gave a speech at a Democratic Congressional Campaign Committee dinner in the Empire Room at the Waldorf Astoria and a Democratic National Committee Hispanic dinner in the Rainbow Room during the evening.
- December 11 – President Clinton delivered an address on the sea at the U.S. Coast Guard Station in Miami, Florida.
- December 12 – President Clinton issued a statement on the International Financial Services Agreement.
- December 13 – President Clinton spoke on Medicare reform during a radio address from the Oval Office. He delivered an address at the Arkansas Democratic National Committee Dinner during the evening.
- December 14 – President Clinton delivered an address on Christmas at the National Building Museum.
- December 15 – President Clinton and Prime Minister of Ireland Bertie Ahern held a joint news conference in the Northwest Portfolio at the White House during the morning. President Clinton announced the appointment of Bill Lann Lee as Acting Assistant Attorney General for Civil Rights in the Oval Office during the afternoon.
- December 19 – President Clinton delivered an address at the Malcolm Baldrige National Quality Awards at the Sheraton Washington Hotel in the morning. He participated in a "race initiative outreach meeting" in the Oval Office during the afternoon.
- December 20 – President Clinton spoke on the government's efforts to help children avoid drug use during his radio address, in a recording made the previous day and aired during the morning.
- December 23 – President Clinton gave a statement on the start of the trial in the Oklahoma City bombing, saying in part, "The successful prosecution of Timothy McVeigh and Terry Nichols should offer a measure of comfort that all Americans stand with the families of Oklahoma City."
- December 27 – President Clinton announced that Medicare beneficiaries would be eligible for more cancer screenings starting January 1.
- December 28 – Senior Advisor to the President Rahm Emanuel said that President Clinton's 1998 budget would not propose any major tax cuts, but that he would be open to receiving a tax cut from Congress so long as it would not violate a spending agreement designed to balance the federal budget by 2002.
- December 29 – President Clinton issued statements on a health care task force and the vandalizing of an Islamic Star display.

== See also ==
- Timeline of the Bill Clinton presidency, for an index of the Clinton presidency timeline articles

U.S. presidential administration timelines
Preceded by Clinton presidency (1996)	Clinton presidency (1997)	Succeeded by Clinton presidency (1998)
