= First inauguration of Bill Clinton =

52nd United States presidential inauguration

First presidential inauguration of Bill Clinton
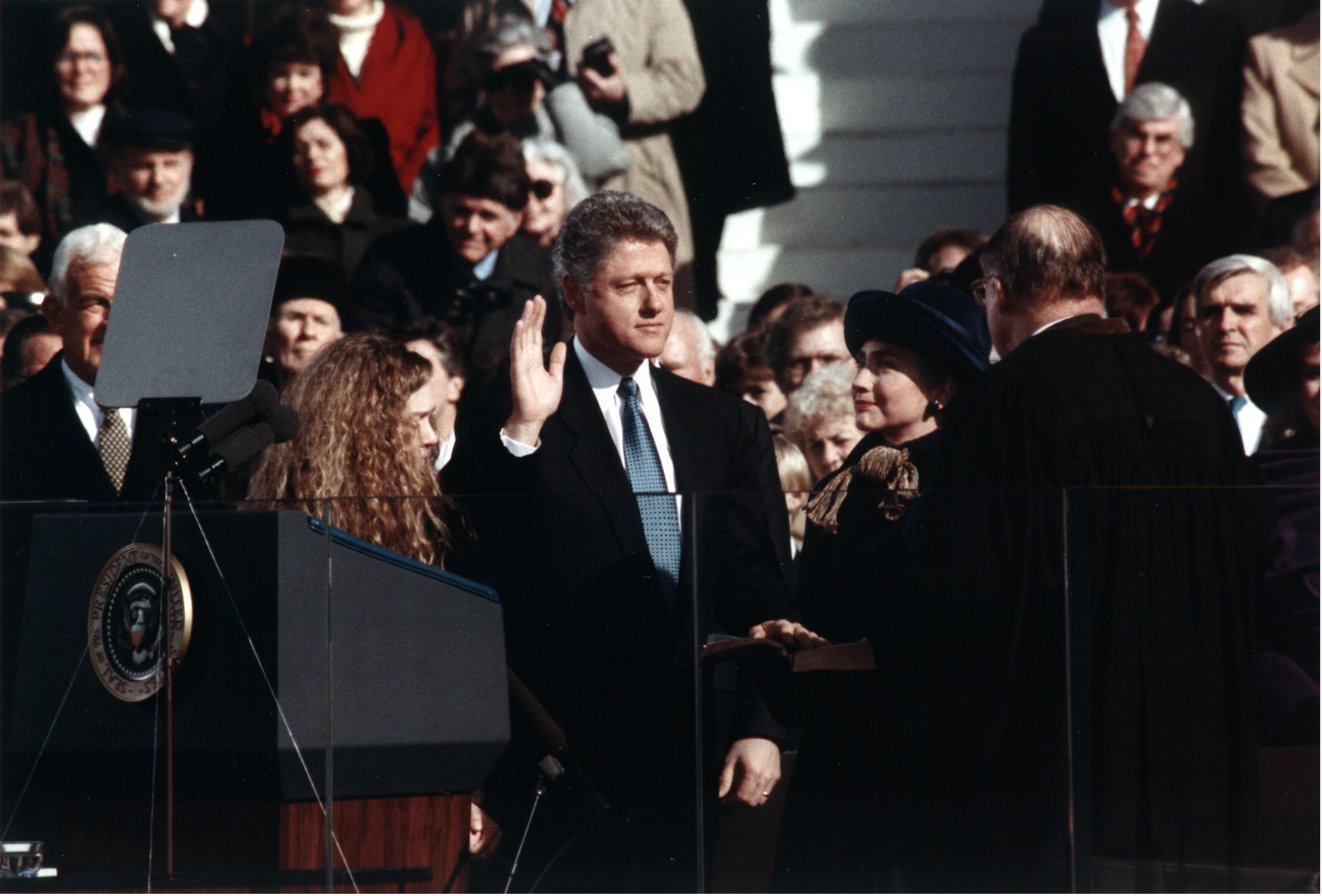
- Bill Clinton takes the oath of office as the 42nd president of the United States.
- Date: January 20, 1993; 33 years ago
- Location: United States Capitol, Washington, D.C.
- Organized by: Joint Congressional Committee on Inaugural Ceremonies
- Participants: Bill Clinton; 42nd president of the United States — Assuming office William Rehnquist; Chief Justice of the United States — Administering oath Al Gore; 45th vice president of the United States — Assuming office Byron White; Associate Justice of the Supreme Court of the United States — Administering oath

The first inauguration of Bill Clinton as the 42nd president of the United States was held on Wednesday, January 20, 1993, at the West Front of the United States Capitol in Washington, D.C. This was the 52nd inauguration and marked the commencement of the first term of Bill Clinton as president and Al Gore as vice president. At 46 years, 154 days of age at the time of his first inauguration, Clinton was the third-youngest person to become president, and the first from the Baby Boomer generation.

== Pre-inaugural events ==
=== Reunion on the Mall ===
America's Reunion on the Mall was a two-day multi-stage festival as part of the 1993 Presidential Inaugural Celebration, held from January 17–19. One million people attended the event on the National Mall between Capitol Hill and the Washington Monument. With tents stretching from the Capitol to the Washington Monument, it was reported to be the largest festival ever held on the Mall. The two-hour outdoor concert that started the festival kicked off the Clinton/Gore Inaugural. Hundreds of thousands of people attended the free concert, which featured musicians Michael Jackson, Aretha Franklin, Michael Bolton, Tony Bennett, Bob Dylan, Diana Ross, and rapper LL Cool J. On that Sunday, Metrorail recorded 440,138 trips, breaking the Sunday record set at the April 5, 1992 March for Women's Lives and setting a record that would be broken the following 4 July.

=== Inaugural bell ringing ceremony ===
On January 17, President-elect Clinton addressed the crowd in a short bell-ringing ceremony to mark his inauguration, after leading a procession across the Memorial Bridge from Washington, DC, to Arlington, Virginia. The ceremony included a brief videotape and statement from the crew of the Space Shuttle Endeavour, and live video links from NASA Mission Control in Houston, Texas, south central Los Angeles, Oklahoma, Nashville, San Francisco, Tallahassee, Little Rock, San Antonio, Philadelphia, Keams Canyon, Arizona, and Atlanta, where crowds had assembled to take part in a bell-ringing ceremony to show the unity of the nation. At 6 p.m., Clinton and Gore, with the help of their children, grasped the red rope attached to the bell and led the nation in a bell ringing ceremony. A spectacular display of fireworks ended the evening's public events.

=== Visit to the Arlington Cemetery ===
On January 19, Clinton visited the Arlington National Cemetery to visit the graves of John F. and Robert F. Kennedy. The visit was not on Clinton's schedule, and only a small group of reporters and photographers were allowed to witness the gathering from 150 yards away. After kneeling at the graveside for a few moments, the Clintons each placed a white rose on the grave of Robert Kennedy, who was shot June 5, 1968, while campaigning for the presidency. Clinton then walked alone to John F. Kennedy's grave and placed another white rose on the marker and knelt for several seconds before the grave. Clinton had met President Kennedy briefly as a teenager in 1963, and credits that encounter with leading him to enter public service.

=== Presidential gala ===
On January 19, 1993, a cast including Michael Jackson, Barbra Streisand, Elton John, Chuck Berry, Little Richard, Judy Collins, Aretha Franklin, Michael Bolton, the Alvin Ailey Dance Troupe, comedians Chevy Chase and Bill Cosby, and actors Jack Lemmon, James Earl Jones, Warren Beatty, and Edward James Olmos, as well as a band of jazz all-stars composed of T.S. Monk, Herbie Hancock, Wynton Marsalis, Clark Terry, Al Grey, Ron Carter, Grover Washington Jr., Illinois Jacquet, and Wayne Shorter performed at the 42nd Presidential Inaugural Gala at the Capital Centre in Landover, Maryland in Clinton's honor.

A specially re-formed Fleetwood Mac took the stage to perform "Don't Stop", Clinton's campaign song. "It was one of those experiences that you never forget," remarked Stevie Nicks. "Bill was very sparkly... Michael Jackson had lost his makeup and wanted to borrow some, so we sent over my foundation and it was not the right color. He sent it back with a big 'thank you' note."

=== Kids' Inaugural ===
Also on January 19, the Clintons took part in an event aimed at younger audiences at the Kennedy Center. Billed as two separate one-hour specials, the Inaugural Celebration for Children and the Inaugural Celebration for Youth were both aired live on Disney Channel.

The Inaugural Celebration for Children was hosted by Markie Post and featured appearances from Mr. Rogers, Kermit the Frog, Raffi, Emmylou Harris, Rosanne Cash, and the cast of Adventures in Wonderland. Notably, during the finale of the special, Steve Whitmire perched the Kermit the Frog puppet on Hillary Clinton's shoulder as he sang during the final song, a photo of which appeared in newspapers across the country.

This was followed by the Inaugural Celebration for Youth, which was hosted by Will Smith and featured appearances from Clarence Clemons, Boyz II Men, Celine Dion, Kenny Loggins, Vanessa Williams, Jay R. Ferguson, Al Gore, the Joffrey Ballet, the L.A. Youth Ensemble Theatre, and the cast of The Mickey Mouse Club.

== Inauguration events ==
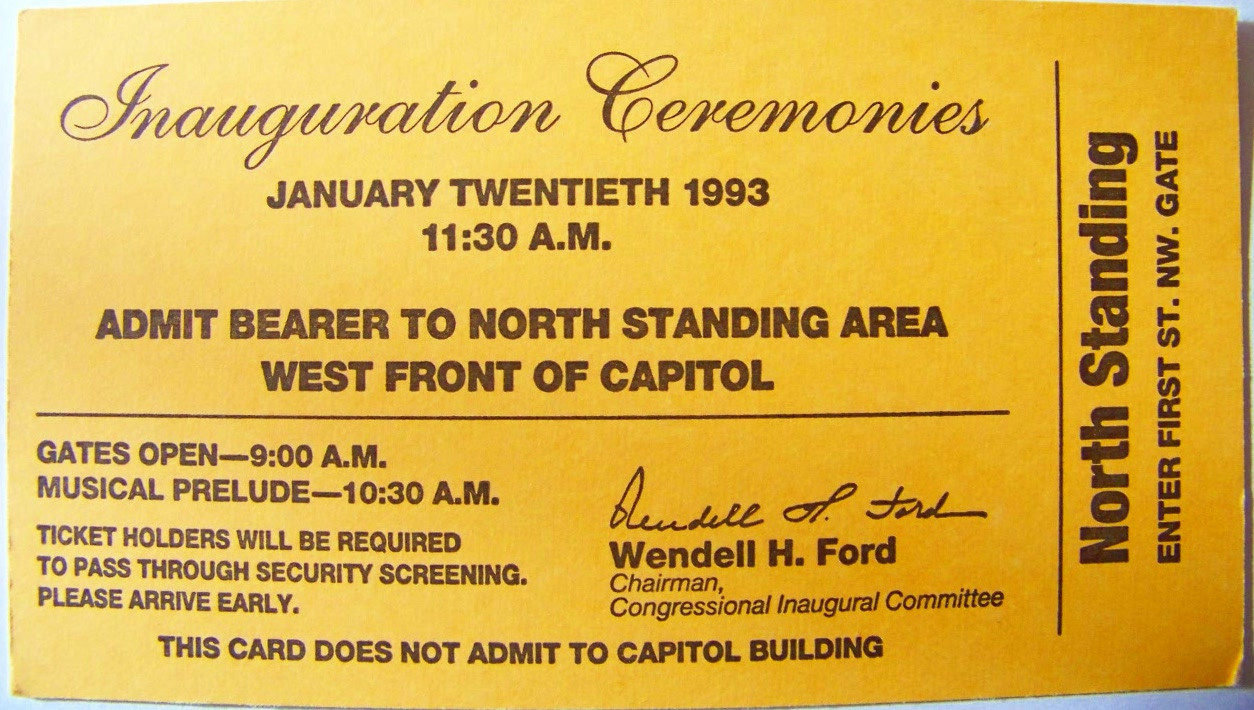
Pass to the Capitol Hill standing area for the inauguration

=== Organization ===
The inaugural ceremonies and luncheon for Clinton's inauguration were planned and executed by the Joint Congressional Committee on Inaugural Ceremonies, as all inaugurations since 1901 have been. Senator Wendell H. Ford chaired the committee for Clinton's first inauguration. It is estimated that the committee spent $333 million on the inauguration.

=== Vice presidential oath ===
The ceremony began with the vice presidential oath of office. Byron White, the Associate Justice, administered the oath to Gore. The oath of office for the vice president is not specified in the Constitution, but Gore used the current form of the oath, which is also used by the Senators, Representatives, and other government officers:

I Albert Gore Jr., do solemnly swear that I will support and defend the Constitution of the United States against all enemies, foreign and domestic, that I will bear true faith and allegiance to the same, that I take this obligation freely, without any mental reservation or purpose of evasion, and I will well and faithfully perform the duties of the office on which I am about to enter, so help me God.

=== Presidential oath ===
At noon, the oath of office was administered to Clinton by Chief Justice William Rehnquist. The oath was sworn on a King James Bible, which was given to him by his grandmother. Standing beside him were his daughter Chelsea and his wife Hillary, who was holding the Bible opened to Galatians 6:9.

Clinton recited the following, as prescribed by the Constitution:

I, William Jefferson Clinton, do solemnly swear that I will faithfully execute the Office of President of the United States, and will to the best of my ability, preserve, protect and defend the Constitution of the United States. [So help me God.]

=== Presidential address ===
Clinton, the first Democratic president in 12 years (since Jimmy Carter), then delivered his inaugural address. In the 1,598-word speech, Clinton informed the nation of his intentions as a leader. Clinton portrayed change as a positive factor, not something to be feared. He reminded his audience that America has a history of overcoming challenges through bold action and re-creating itself for the better in the process using examples such as the Great Depression and the Civil War. As the first president elected in the post–Cold War era, Clinton stressed the importance of renewal for America, and hinted that he would work to make positive change in America. "The Star Spangled Banner", the American national anthem and "God Bless America", an American patriotic song, were both played following Clinton's address.

=== Poetry ===
After Clinton's inaugural address, Maya Angelou recited her poem "On the Pulse of Morning". The poem, which Angelou wrote specifically for the inauguration, shared common themes to Clinton's inaugural address, including change, responsibility, and the president's and the citizenry's role in establishing economic security. Angelou became the second poet in history to read a poem at a presidential inauguration, as Robert Frost was the first, who recited a poem at John F Kennedy's inauguration in 1961.

=== Religious elements ===
Since 1937, the inauguration ceremonies have included one or more prayers. During Clinton's first inauguration, Rev. Billy Graham, who also delivered invocations during the first inauguration on George W Bush, and the second Inauguration of Bill Clinton, gave an invocation and benediction:

Our God and our Father, we thank you for this historic occasion when we inaugurate our new President and Vice-President. We thank you for the moral and spiritual foundations which our forefathers gave us and which are rooted deeply in scripture. Those principles nourished and guided us as a nation in the past, but we cannot say that we are a righteous people. We've sinned against you. We've sown to the wind and are reaping the whirlwind of crime, drug abuse, racism, immorality, and social injustice. We need to repent of our sins and turn by faith to you. And now, on this twentieth day of January, 1993, we commit to you President-elect Clinton and Vice-President-elect Gore, who you have permitted to take leadership at this critical time in our nation's history. Help them always to see the office to which they've been elected as a sacred trust from you. We pray that you will bless their wives who will share so much of the responsibility and burdens. Make President-elect Clinton know that he is never really alone but that the eternal God can be his refuge and he can turn to you in every circumstance. Give him the wisdom you've promised to those who ask and the strength that you alone can give. We thank you for his predecessor President Bush and the dedication he gave to this office. Bless him as he and Mrs. Bush continue their dedicated service to our country in other spheres. We commit this inaugural ceremony to you and ask that the memory of this event may always remind us to pray for our leaders. I pray this in the name of the one that's called Wonderful Counselor, Mighty God, the Everlasting Father and the Prince of Peace. Amen.

=== Attendance ===
The Clinton Inauguration drew what was, at the time, the second largest crowd ever at an inauguration, an estimated 800,000. The Johnson Inauguration had drawn an estimated 1.2 million and Obama's later drew 1.9 million in 2008 and 1 million in 2012, placing it in the 4th largest spot as of 2017. The large crowd resulted in a single-day Metro record of 811,257 trips, a record that would last 11 years and 4 months - the longest lasting record in Metrorail history - until it was broken by the Reagan Funeral Procession.

Weather conditions for 12 noon at Washington National Airport, located 3.1 miles from the ceremony, were: 39 °F (4 °C), wind 8 mph, and clear.

== Post-ceremony traditions ==
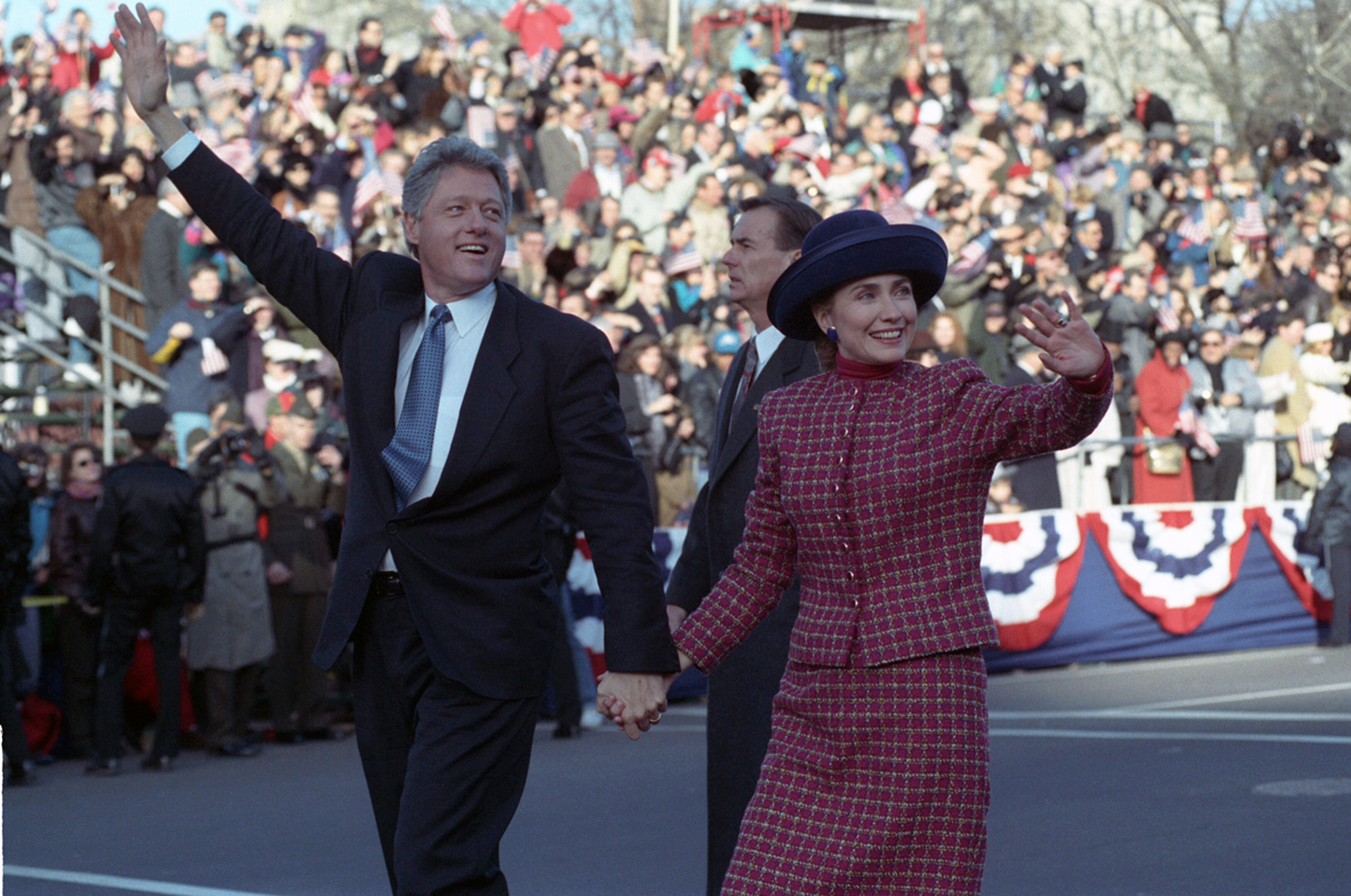
The President and the First Lady during the parade

=== Departure of the former president ===
Following the inaugural ceremony on the west front of the U.S. Capitol, President Clinton, First Lady Hillary Clinton, Vice President Al Gore and Tipper Gore escorted former president George H. W. Bush and former first lady Barbara Bush to a departure ceremony on the east side of the U.S. Capitol. George H. W. Bush and his wife Barbara then departed on a plane to return to Houston, Texas.

=== Congressional luncheon ===
Clinton and Gore were guests of honor at a luncheon held by the United States Congress immediately following the inaugural ceremony. The luncheon was held in Statuary Hall and was attended by the leadership of both houses of Congress as well as guests of the president and vice president. By tradition, former president George H. W. Bush and former vice president Dan Quayle did not attend.

=== Inaugural parade ===
After the luncheon, Clinton and his wife made their way down Pennsylvania Avenue to the White House, followed by a procession of ceremonial military regiments, citizens' groups, marching bands, and floats. The Clintons traveled in a limousine down Pennsylvania Avenue to the cheers of a large crowd lining the street. The Clintons got out of the limousine to walk the final few blocks to the White House, followed by the Gores a few minutes later.

=== Inaugural balls ===
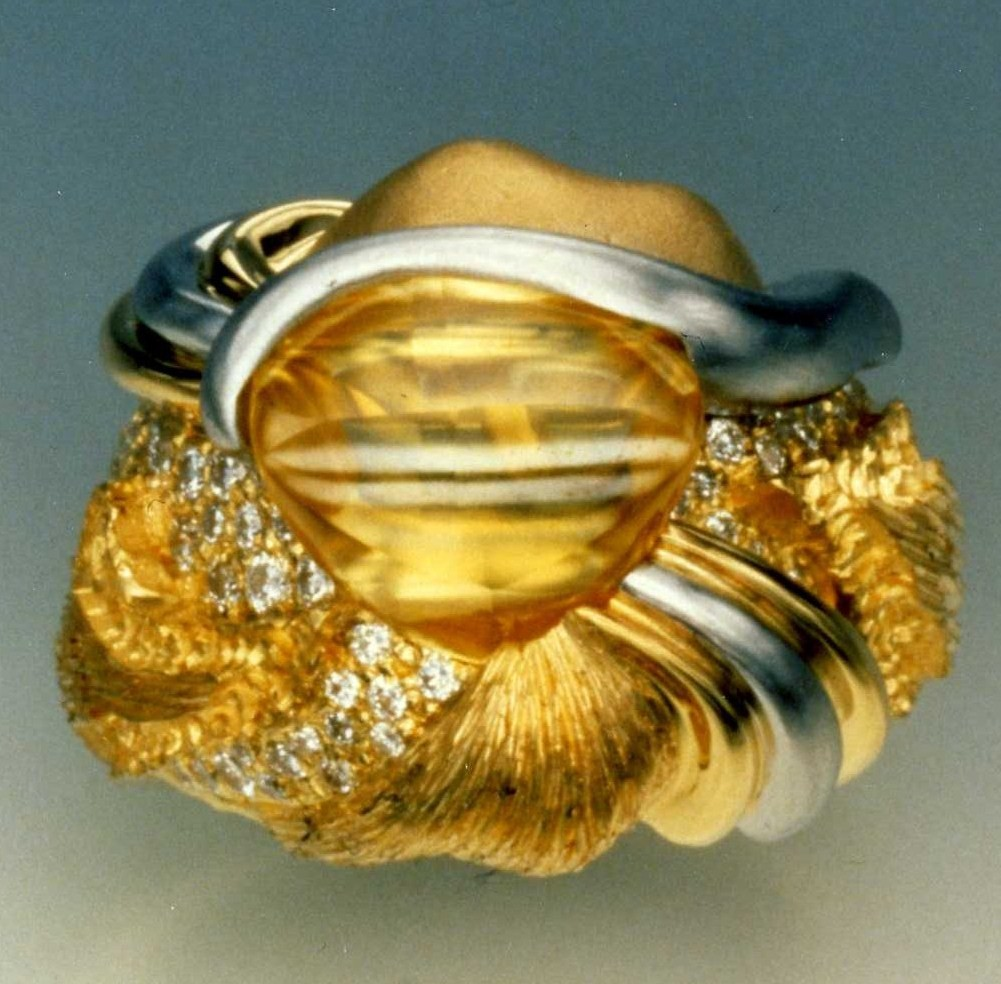
Arkansas diamond in 1992 Dunay setting created for Hillary Clinton for the inaugural balls

After the parade, the president, vice president and their families attended the 11 official inaugural balls held in their honor. Sites for these balls included National Air and Space Museum, D.C. Armory, D.C. Convention Center, Kennedy Center, National Building Museum, Old Post Office Pavilion (Youth Ball), Omni Shoreham Hotel, S. Dillon Ripley Center, Sheraton Washington Hotel, Union Station, and the Washington Hilton.

== Members of the inauguration committee ==
- Sen. Wendell H. Ford (D-KY), Chairman
- Sen. George J. Mitchell (D-ME)
- Sen. Ted Stevens (R-AK)
- Rep. Tom Foley (D-WA)
- Rep. Dick Gephardt (D-MO)
- Rep. Robert H. Michel (R-IL)
- John Chambers, executive director (former UPI correspondent, son of Whittaker Chambers, previously executive director for the second inauguration of Ronald Reagan)

== See also ==
- 1992 United States presidential election
- Bill Clinton 1992 presidential campaign
- Presidential transition of Bill Clinton – Transfer of presidential power from George H. W. Bush to Bill Clinton
- First 100 days of the Clinton presidency – Period from January to April 1993
- Second inauguration of Bill Clinton – 53rd United States presidential inauguration
- Presidency of Bill Clinton
- Timeline of the Bill Clinton presidency (1993)
