= Second inauguration of Bill Clinton =

53rd United States presidential inauguration

Second presidential inauguration of Bill Clinton
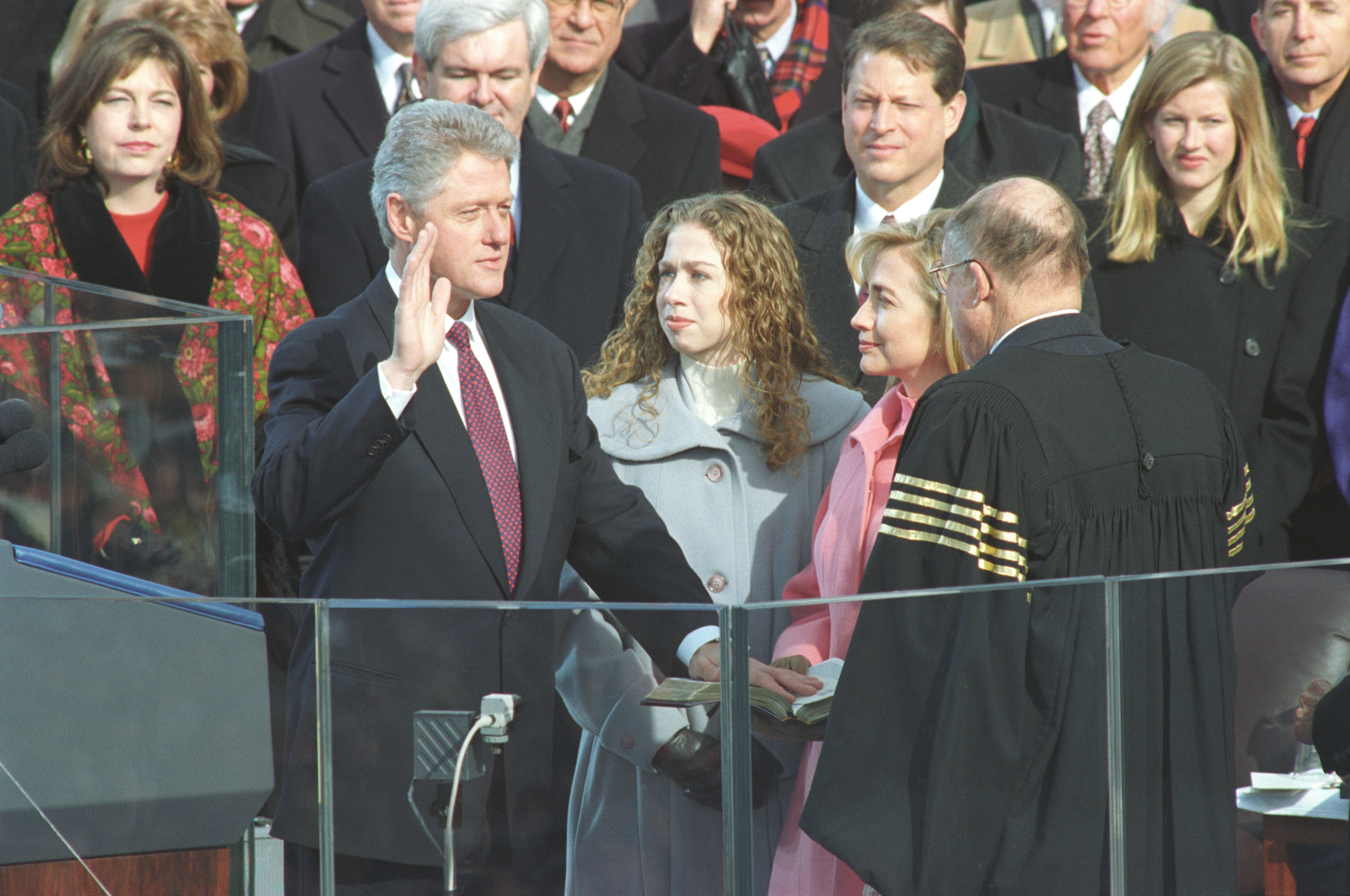
- Bill Clinton takes the oath of office for his second term
- Date: January 20, 1997; 29 years ago
- Location: United States Capitol, Washington, D.C.
- Organized by: Joint Congressional Committee on Inaugural Ceremonies
- Participants: Bill Clinton; 42nd president of the United States — Assuming office William Rehnquist; Chief Justice of the United States — Administering oath Al Gore; 45th vice president of the United States — Assuming office Ruth Bader Ginsburg; Associate Justice of the Supreme Court of the United States — Administering oath

The second inauguration of Bill Clinton as president of the United States was held on Monday, January 20, 1997, at the West Front of the United States Capitol Building in Washington, D.C. This was the 53rd inauguration and marked the commencement of the second and final term of Bill Clinton as president and Al Gore as vice president. This was the last presidential inauguration to take place in the 20th century, the last in the 2nd millennium, and the first to be streamed live on the internet.

== Inaugural ceremony ==
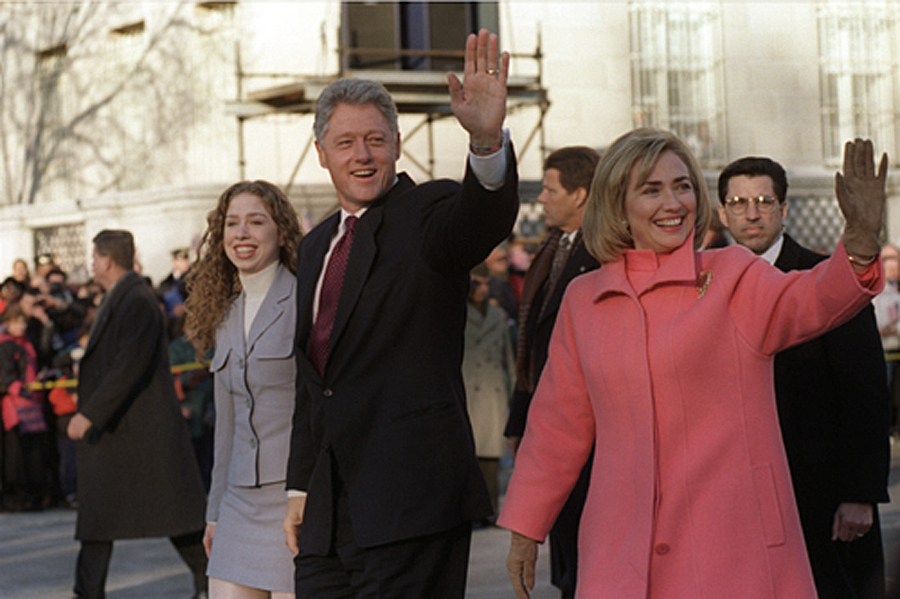
Hillary, Bill, and Chelsea walking the inaugural parade route

Reverend Billy Graham gave an invocation to start the ceremony followed by the Pledge of Allegiance. Associate Justice of the Supreme Court of the United States Ruth Bader Ginsburg gave the oath to office for Vice President Al Gore. Jessye Norman, the famed Georgian opera singer, then serenaded the crowd with a medley of patriotic songs. Following the performance, surrounded by members of Congress dignitaries, Justices of the Supreme Court, family, and friends, Bill Clinton stood next to his daughter while his wife held the Bible. The oath to office was administered by Chief Justice William Rehnquist at 12:05 pm. The oath was ended with the traditional words, "So help me God." The National Anthem was sung by Santita Jackson, daughter of renowned civil rights activist Jesse Jackson, and then Arkansas poet Miller Williams read "Of History and Hope", a poem he wrote for the occasion. President Clinton's inaugural speech followed. The inauguration was celebrated that night by 14 different official galas held in honor of the President and First Lady.

January 20, 1997, was also Martin Luther King Jr. Day. The President's speech addressed King and his legacy as a champion of African-American rights and freedoms during the civil rights era. In addition, luncheon was held after the oath was taken at the Capitol's Statuary Hall that was based on traditional recipes from President Thomas Jefferson's era. Miller Williams, a poet from Clinton's home state of Arkansas, penned the poem "Of History and Hope" especially for the day.

Weather conditions for 12 noon at Washington National Airport, located 3.1 miles from the ceremony, were: 34 °F (1 °C), wind 7 mph, and cloudy.

== See also ==
- First inauguration of Bill Clinton
- Timeline of the Bill Clinton presidency (1997)
- 1996 United States presidential election
- Bill Clinton 1996 presidential campaign
