= Timeline of the Bill Clinton presidency (1999) =

The following is a timeline of the presidency of Bill Clinton from January 1, 1999, to December 31, 1999.

== January ==
- January 7 – The Senate trial on removing President Clinton from office began.
- January 19 – President Clinton delivered his annual State of the Union Address before a joint session of Congress.

== February ==
- February 12 – President Clinton was acquitted by the United States Senate on charges of perjury (in a vote of 45–55) and obstruction of justice (in a vote of 50–50), ending his impeachment trial.

== March ==
- March 24 – In a press conference at the White House President Clinton argued for the importance of NATO military action against Yugoslavia.

== April ==
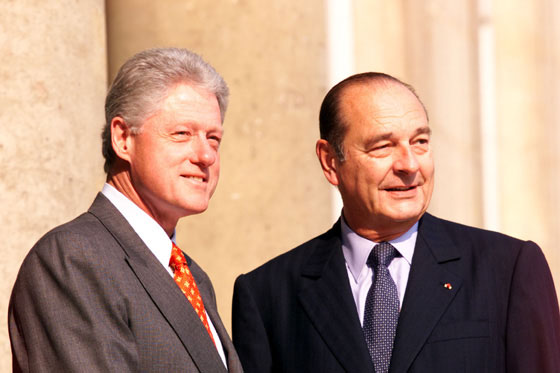
- President Bill Clinton and French President Jacques Chirac at the Élysée Palace, Paris, France, June 17, 1999.
  Bill Clinton's Remarks Regarding Columbine HS Shooting April 20, 1999
  April 20 – President Clinton addressed the nation about the Columbine High School massacre.

== May ==
- May 13 – Speaking to the Veterans of Foreign Wars organization, President Clinton justified US intervention in Kosovo.

== June ==
- June 16–17 – President Clinton met with President of France Jacques Chirac.

== July ==
- July 15 – Speaking on the South Lawn, President Clinton called on Congress to pass gun control legislation.
- July 16 – President Clinton delivered an address at Amos Hiatt Middle School in Des Moines, Iowa.

== August ==
- August 10 – President Clinton gave an address at the 100th meeting of the Veterans of Foreign Wars.

== September ==
- September 21 – In an address to the UN, President Clinton urged the body to support regional actors more, in place of reliance on US intervention concerning matters such as the East Timor genocide.

== October ==
- October 7 – President Clinton gave remarks at an event supporting the Comprehensive Nuclear-Test-Ban Treaty.

== November ==
- November 21–23 – President Clinton visited Bulgaria and met with President Petar Stoyanov and Prime Minister Ivan Kostov.

== See also ==
- Timeline of the Bill Clinton presidency, for an index of the Clinton presidency timeline articles

U.S. presidential administration timelines
Preceded by Clinton presidency (1998)	Clinton presidency (1999)	Succeeded by Clinton presidency (2000–2001)
