= Timeline of the Bill Clinton presidency (1998) =

The following is a timeline of the presidency of Bill Clinton, from January 1, 1998, to December 31, 1998.

== January ==
- January 2 – In a letter to congressional leaders, President Clinton noted the 1986 declaration of a national emergency between the United States and Libya and its lack of resolve.
- January 2 – In a letter to the Speaker of the House and President of the Senate, President Clinton sent a "report on progress toward a negotiated settlement of the Cyprus question."
- January 3 – Recorded remarks of President Clinton discussing the new year and the Peace Corps were broadcast on the radio.
- January 5 – In an afternoon Cabinet Room appearance, President Clinton delivered remarks on the federal budget and answered questions from reporters on tobacco legislation and press coverage of his vacation.
- January 6 – President Clinton announced his proposal of "three new health care options that would give them the security they deserve" in the Roosevelt Room.
- January 6 – President Clinton issued a statement on the death of Sonny Bono.
- January 7 – President Clinton announced his proposal of "the single largest national commitment to childcare in the history of the United States" in the East Room.
- January 7 – President Clinton issued a statement on the death of Customs Senior Special Agent Manuel Zurita.
- January 8 – President Clinton attended a luncheon for the Democratic National Committee at a private residence in New York City.
- January 8 – In a statement, President Clinton said that "15 major city school systems have stepped forward to accept my challenge" after he requested national education standards and that those in favor of this policy such as himself should press forward until every school system does the same.
- January 8 – During an appearance at a New York City-based Democratic National Committee Dinner, President Clinton delivered an address and answered questions on the projected federal budget surplus, his initiative on race, Asian economics, Middle East peace and Iraq, medical research federal funding, support for the arts, and relations between the United States and Cuba.
- January 9 – President Clinton delivered an address at Mission High School in Mission, Texas.
- January 9 – President Clinton attended a reception for U.S. Representative Rubén Hinojosa at a private residence in McAllen, Texas.
- January 9 – President Clinton delivered remarks on the G.I. Bill and the HOPE scholarship in the Confederate Air Force Museum Hangar at the Brownsville South Padre International Airport in Brownsville, Texas.
- January 9 – President Clinton delivered remarks to high school students, teachers, and parents at the George R. Brown Convention Center in Houston, Texas.
- January 9 – President Clinton attended a reception for Representative Sheila Jackson Lee in the ballroom at the Four Seasons Hotel in Houston.
- January 10 Recorded remarks in which President Clinton discussed breakthroughs in science were broadcast on the radio.
- January 12 – President Clinton announced his "directing the Attorney General to strengthen" efforts associated with enforcing a bill he signed the previous year requiring prisoners throughout the United States be tested for drugs prior to receiving federal prison funds. He also outlined a three step necessity of aiding state expansion of "drug detection, offender testing, and drug treatment in their prisons by making it possible for them to use Federal funds for these purposes," strengthening state laws on drug trafficking with the enactment of "stiffer penalties for anyone who smuggles drugs into prison," and uncovering "how many of their prisoners are actually using drugs so that every year they can chart their progress in keeping drugs out of prisons and away from prisoners." President Clinton subsequently answered questions from reporters concerning Asian economics, Iraq, the sexual offender trafficking system, and legislative initiatives.
- January 12 – President Clinton issued a memorandum to the Attorney General on matters which he believed would reduce crimes related to drugs, and maintain order.
- January 12 – President Clinton attended an outreach program on his race initiative in the Cabinet Room.
- January 13 – In a statement, President Clinton announced the Department of Health and Human Services "is removing the moratorium because those new, tougher regulations are in place to root out fraud and abuse in the home health industry."
- January 13 – In a letter to Speaker of the House Newt Gingrich and Senate Foreign Relations Committee Chairman Jesse Helms, President Clinton transmitted a report concerning the "progress toward a negotiated settlement of the Cyprus question covering the period October 1 to November 30, 1997".
- January 13 – President Clinton transmitted a report to Congress concerning "developments since my last report of June 26, 1997, concerning the national emergency with respect to Libya that was declared in Executive Order 12543 of January 7, 1986".
- January 14 – President Clinton delivered an address in favor of a health care bill of rights bill and answered a question relating to Iraq in the Grand Foyer.
- January 27 – President Clinton delivered his annual State of the Union Address before a joint session of Congress.
- January 28 – President Clinton delivered an address on the need to prepare for the 21st Century through reforms in Social Security and growing the economy at the University of Illinois Urbana-Champaign.
- January 28 – President Clinton delivered an address at the La Crosse Convention Center in La Crosse, Wisconsin.
- January 28 – President Clinton announced the nomination of Joseph W. Ralston for a second 2-year tour as Vice Chairman of the Joint Chiefs of Staff.
- January 28 – In a statement, President Clinton expressed satisfaction "that today Senators Chafee, Hatch, Snowe, Roberts, Specter, and Collins proposed a childcare package that, like mine, significantly increases childcare subsidies for poor children, provides additional tax relief to help low- and middle-income families pay for childcare, creates a tax credit for businesses that provide childcare to their employees, and improves State enforcement of health and safety standards."
- January 28 – President Clinton transmitted the Extradition Treaty between the Government of the United States of America and the Government of the Republic of Zimbabwe to the Senate for its advice and consent in a message.
- January 28 – President Clinton transmitted the Treaty Between the United States of America and the Republic of Latvia on Mutual Legal Assistance in Criminal Matters to the Senate for its advice and consent in a message.
- January 28 – President Clinton transmitted "the text of a proposed Agreement for Cooperation Between the Government of the United States of America and the Republic of Kazakhstan Concerning Peaceful Uses of Nuclear Energy, with accompanying annex and agreed minute" to Congress in a message.
- January 28 – President Clinton transmitted "the text of a proposed Agreement for Cooperation Between the Government of the United States of America and the Swiss Federal Council Concerning Peaceful Uses of Nuclear Energy, with accompanying agreed minute, annexes, and other attachments" to Congress in a message.
- January 29 – A recording of President Clinton noting the end of the holy month of Ramadan was broadcast on the U.S. Information Agency WORLDNET.
- January 29 – President Clinton delivered an address in Baruch Auditorium of the National Defense University.
- January 29 – In a statement, President Clinton condemned "the senseless violence that claimed the life of an off-duty police officer, and injured others, in Birmingham, Alabama" earlier in the morning and sent his thoughts and prayers.
- January 29 – President Clinton transmitted the Trademark Law Treaty done at Geneva to the Senate for its advice and consent in a message.
- January 30 – President Clinton addressed a United States Conference of Mayors Breakfast in the State Dining Room.
- January 30 – President Clinton addressed the 1997 Stanley Cup Champion Detroit Red Wings in the East Room.
- January 30 – In a statement, President Clinton announced that the "United States has reached a landmark agreement with Japan that will dramatically increase air service between our countries", and said that the agreement "will expand a $10 billion market that services nearly 12 million passengers and carries well over 1 billion pounds of cargo each year."
- January 30 – President Clinton issued a memorandum to department and agency leadership on the use of technology to enhance learning and education.
- January 31 – A recording of President Clinton discussing climate change and economy was broadcast on the radio.
- January 31 – In a letter to congressional leaders, President Clinton reported his issuing of "Presidential Determination No. 97-35 (copy attached) and thereby exercised the authority to grant certain exemptions under section 6001(a) of the Act."

== February ==
- February 2 – President Clinton delivered an address on the effectiveness of the 1999 Federal Budget in the East Room.
- February 2 – In a statement, President Clinton announced that "Secretaries Babbitt and Glickman are transmitting to Congress a list of sites that are particularly precious to Americans and deserving of our stewardship."
- February 3 – President Clinton delivered an address at the Los Alamos National Laboratory in the Main Auditorium of the Administration Building in Los Alamos, New Mexico.
- February 3 – President Clinton delivered remarks on the benefit the economy can make to the 21st Century and balancing the budget while at the Civic Plaza in Albuquerque, New Mexico.
- February 3 – In a statement, President Clinton stated his support for "action to end the soft money raised by both political parties" and request members of the Federal Election Commission "step up to their responsibility and act, within their legal authority, to end the soft money system."
- February 3 – President Clinton issued a statement expressing condolences for the families of those killed in the Cavalese cable car disaster.
- February 3 – President Clinton issued a statement on the death of Roger Stevens.
- February 3 – President Clinton transmitted the annual report of the Railroad Retirement Board for Fiscal Year 1996 in a message to Congress.
- February 3 – President Clinton transmitted "an Agreement between the Government of the United States of America and the Government of the Republic of Latvia" to Congress in a message.
- February 3 – President Clinton transmitted "eight new deferrals of budgetary resources, totaling $4.8 billion" to Congress in a message.
- February 3 – In a letter to Speaker of the House Gingrich and President of the Senate Gore, President Clinton reported "on the status of efforts to obtain Iraq's compliance with the resolutions adopted by the United Nations Security Council (UNSC)."
- February 3 – In a message to Congress, President Clinton reported "on the developments since my last report of July 31, 1997, concerning the national emergency with respect to Iraq".
- February 4 – President Clinton announced the High Hopes for College Initiative in the East Room. President Clinton recounts his own upbringing and the benefits of the program's enactment.
- February 5 – President Clinton attended the National Prayer Breakfast in the International Ballroom of the Washington Hilton Hotel.
- February 5 – President Clinton delivered remarks welcoming Prime Minister of the United Kingdom Tony Blair in the Grand Foyer.
- February 5 – President Clinton answered questions from reporters on the investigation of the Independent Counsel, the administration's handling of Iraq, the peace process in the Middle East, the peace process in Northern Ireland, public responsibilities, and relations between the United States and the United Kingdom in the Oval Office.
- February 5 – President Clinton delivered an address in the gymnasium of Montgomery Blair High School in Silver Spring, Maryland.
- February 5 – In a statement, President Clinton endorsed the legislation put forward by Senator Chris Dodd and other Democratic members of the chamber and stated that he looks forward "to working with the Congress on a bipartisan basis to enact child care legislation this year that will help Americans fulfill their responsibilities as workers, and even more importantly, as parents."
- February 5 – In a statement, President Clinton noted the fifth anniversary of the signing of the Family and Medical Leave Act of 1993 and said that the law "has been good for America's families and good for this country's businesses", adding that it "deserves support and expansion so it can continue to work for American workers, their families, and their employers."
- February 5 – President Clinton transmitted the 1996 annual report of the National Endowment for the Humanities (NEH) to Congress in a message.
- February 5 – President Clinton transmitted "an Agreement between the Government of the United States of America and the Government of the Republic of Poland extending the Agreement of August 1, 1985, Concerning Fisheries Off the Coasts of the United States, with annexes and agreed minutes, as amended and extended (the 1985 Agreement)" to Congress in a message.
- February 5 – President Clinton transmitted the report of the Commodity Credit Corporation for fiscal year 1995 to Congress in a message.
- February 5 – In a letter to the chairman and members of the Federal Communications Commission, President Clinton discussed the importance of free and discounted airtime which he said, "can make our most powerfully effective medium a powerful force for expanding democracy in the information age."
- February 5 – President Clinton attended a state dinner in honor of Prime Minister Blair in the State Dining Room.
- February 6 – President Clinton held his one hundred and fifty-fifth news conference with Prime Minister Blair in the East Room. President Clinton and Prime Minister Blair began the conference with remarks on handling of their Iraq and answered questions from reporters on witnesses in the investigation of the Independent Counsel, personal integrity and public responsibility, the Iraq situation, the civil lawsuit of Paula Jones, Iraq situation, the relationship between the two, the possibility of President Clinton resigning, domestic reforms of the United Kingdom, right-wing conspiracy, Monica Lewinsky, and the Cavalese cable car disaster.
- February 6 – In a statement, President Clinton said the U.S.-Mexico Binational Drug Strategy "lays out the concrete actions our two governments will take to fulfil the 16 goals set out in our Alliance Against Drugs, including dismantling the criminal organizations that purvey these poisons, sustaining our success in reducing drug demand, and removing obstacles to even closer law enforcement cooperation with Mexico."
- February 6 – President Clinton signed S. 1575 into law, on the occasion of the eighty-seventh birthday of former President Ronald Reagan, changing the name of the bill passed to the name of the Washington National Airport to the Ronald Reagan Washington National Airport.
- February 7 – Recorded joint remarks by President Clinton and Prime Minister Blair on foreign policy are broadcast.
- February 7 – President Clinton issued a statement on the death of Lieutenant Colonel Henry G. Van Winkle II the previous day.
- February 8 – President Clinton delivered an address at the Festival at Ford's Theatre.
- February 9 – President Clinton delivered an address at Georgetown University in Gaston Hall.
- February 10 – President Clinton delivered remarks on foreign policy and the administration's economic policy as well as the administration's intent to "save Social Security for the 21st century" during an appearance in the Rose Garden.
- February 10 – In a statement, President Clinton stated his satisfaction with the Senate confirmation of David Satcher for Surgeon General and Assistant Secretary for Health and thanks various senators for supporting the nomination.
- February 10 – President Clinton and President of Bulgaria Petar Stoyanov held a White House meeting for discussions on strengthening relations between the United States and Bulgaria and mutual efforts for furthering cooperation "in Southeast Europe and advance Bulgaria's integration into the European and transatlantic communities, including NATO."
- February 11 – President Clinton presented the Ron Brown Award for Corporate Leadership in the Roosevelt Room.
- February 11 – President Clinton signed the transmittal of documents adding Poland, Hungary, and the Czech Republic to NATO to the Senate for its advice and consent in the Benjamin Franklin Room at the State Department.
- February 11 – In a statement, President Clinton said he looked forward to the continued service of United States Secretary of the Interior Bruce Babbitt.
- February 11 – President Clinton attended the First Millennium Evening in the East Room.
- February 11 – In a letter to congressional leadership, President Clinton noted his previous his previous transmitting of the Comprehensive Nuclear Test Ban Treaty (CTBT) to the Senate and announced "the Secretaries' conclusion that the nuclear stockpile has no safety or reliability concerns that require underground testing at this time."
- February 12 – President Clinton delivered an address to the Joint Democratic Caucus in the Dirksen Senate Office Building.
- February 12 – In a statement, President Clinton expressed the benefits of the line-item veto and though admitting his disappointment with the day's ruling, states his conviction that the line item veto will eventually be ruled constitutional by the U.S. Supreme Court.
- February 12 – President Clinton issued a statement on the observance of President's Day and spoke on the challenges of his predecessors George Washington and Abraham Lincoln.
- February 13 – David Satcher was sworn in as the 16th Surgeon General and Assistant Secretary for Health in the Roosevelt Room.
- February 13 – President Clinton delivered an address to the American Association for the Advancement of Science at the Philadelphia Marriott Hotel in Philadelphia, Pennsylvania.
- February 13 – President Clinton signed the Holocaust Victims Redress Act into law. President Clinton said the legislation authorizes the federal government "to provide further assistance to needy Holocaust survivors and also strengthens current U.S. efforts aimed at encouraging countries that possess gold looted from Holocaust victims to donate those assets to the Nazi Persecution Relief Fund."
- February 13 – President Clinton attended a reception for the Democratic Congressional Campaign Committee at a private residence in Philadelphia.
- February 14 – Recorded remarks of President Clinton discussing crime and policies related to drug possession are broadcast on the radio.
- February 17 – President Clinton addressed the Pentagon in its auditorium in Arlington, Virginia.
- February 17 – President Clinton delivered remarks to the 1997 World Series Champion Florida Marlins in the East Room at the White House.
- February 18 – President Clinton delivered an address on the Children's Health Care Initiative in the atrium at Children's Hospital.
- February 18 – President Clinton issued a memorandum to department and agency leadership on the Children's Health Insurance Outreach and five steps each department should take "to increase enrollment of uninsured children in Medicaid and CHIP".
- February 18 – President Clinton attended a reception for Representative James P. Moran at a private residence.
- February 18 – President Clinton attended a Democratic National Committee Dinner at a private residence.
- February 19 – President Clinton delivered an address on the Iraq situation and answered questions from reporters on the investigation of the Independent Counsel and the Iraq situation.
- February 19 – During an appearance before the Living Classrooms Foundation, President Clinton answered questions from reporters on the subject of the Living Classrooms Water Quality Experiment and the travels of Vice President Al Gore.
- February 19 – President Clinton announced the creation of the New Clean Water Initiative in Baltimore at the Living Classrooms Foundation.
- February 19 – President Clinton attended a luncheon for the Democratic Business Council in the Harbour Court Hotel.
- February 19 – In a statement, President Clinton confirmed he has "been briefed by the Attorney General on today's arrests in Nevada" and the intent of the administration to monitor the situation.
- February 19 – President Clinton attended a dinner for the Democratic National Committee at a private residence in West Orange, New Jersey.
- February 20 – President Clinton delivered an address in the gymnasium of the Holiday Park Senior Center in Wheaton, Maryland.
- February 20 – President Clinton issued a memorandum to department and agency leadership concerning compliance with the Patient Bill of Rights and gives directions to each department for it specifically "to come into compliance with the Patient Bill of Rights."
- February 25 – President Clinton attended a Democratic Congressional Campaign Committee Dinner at a private residence in San Francisco, California.
- February 25 – President Clinton submitted a message to Congress containing a notice in relation to Cuba stating "that the emergency is to continue in effect beyond the anniversary date".
- February 25 – President Clinton transmitted the report of the Corporation for Public Broadcasting to Congress in a message.
- February 26 – President Clinton attended the Technology '98 Conference in the ballroom at the Ritz Carlton Hotel in San Francisco.
- February 26 – President Clinton delivered an address on disaster assistance in the auditorium at the Scottish Rite Community Center in Oakland, California.
- February 26 – In a statement, President Clinton stated his dissatisfaction with the Senate vote on the bipartisan finance reform legislation sponsored by Senators Russ Feingold and John McCain. While commending those who voted in favor of the legislation, he charges the Republicans with instead choosing "to preserve the system of soft money and unlimited backdoor campaign expenditures."
- February 26 – In a statement, President Clinton stated his satisfaction with Representative Barbara B. Kennelly's introduction of "comprehensive child care legislation that is also designed to meet the needs of America's children and families."
- February 27 – In a statement, President Clinton announced the Justice Department "is awarding more than $135 million in grants under the Violence Against Women program to help State and local authorities combat domestic violence, stalking, and sexual assault."
- February 27 – In a letter to Chairman of the Federal Communications Commission on Campaign Finance Reform Kennard, President Clinton addressed the Senate defeat of the comprehensive campaign finance reform legislation and applauded Kennard for a "previous decision to take the next steps toward providing such free and reduced rate time."
- February 27 – In a letter to members of the Federal Election Commission, President Clinton addressed the ramifications of the Senate defeat on comprehensive campaign finance reform legislation and states his appreciation for the efforts of the FEC.
- February 27 – In a letter to Speaker of the House Gingrich and Chairman of the Senate Foreign Relations Committee Helms, President Clinton transmitted "a report prepared by the Department of State concerning international agreements."
- February 28 – Remarks by President Clinton in which he discussed education are broadcast on the radio.
- February 28 – President Clinton delivered an address on disaster assistance for California while on the tarmac at Los Angeles International Airport in Los Angeles, California.
- February 28 – President Clinton attended a fundraiser for California Senator Barbara Boxer at a private residence in Los Angeles.
- February 28 – President Clinton transmitted the 1998 Trade Policy Agenda and 1997 Annual Report on the Trade Agreements Program to Congress in a message.

== March ==
- March 2 – President Clinton addressed the Mortgage Bankers Association of America in the Columbia Ballroom at the Hyatt Regency Hotel.
- March 2 – In a statement, President Clinton said the United Nations Security Council vote on Iraq sends a message advocating for Iraq to "make good on its commitment to give the international weapons inspectors immediate, unconditional, and unrestricted access to any suspect site, any place, any time."
- March 2 – President Clinton addressed the John F. Kennedy Presidential Library Foundation Dinner in the Hall of the Americas at the Organization of American States.
- March 3 – President Clinton signed a memorandum on the standards that will enable a higher prevention of drinking and driving in the East Room.
- March 3 – In a statement responding to the decision of Representative Esteban Torres to not seek another term in office, President Clinton praises his service and said, "his retirement after over 15 years will be a loss felt across the country."
- March 3 – In a statement, President Clinton praises the vote by the Senate Foreign Relations Committee to add Poland, Hungary, and the Czech Republic to NATO, adding that their inclusions "will make NATO stronger, Europe more stable, and America more secure."
- March 3 – President Clinton issued a memorandum to department and agency leadership on moves he wants done to improve customer service as well as "assure that Government works better and gets results Americans care about".
- March 3 – President Clinton transmitted the 1998 National Drug Control Strategy to Congress in a message.
- March 3 – President Clinton transmitted the 32nd Annual Report of the Department of Housing and Urban Development to Congress in a message.
- March 3 – President Clinton transmitted the Seventh Biennial Report of the Interagency Arctic Research Policy Committee to Congress in a message.
- March 3 – President Clinton attended the seventy-five-year celebration of Time at Radio City Music Hall in New York City.
- March 3 – President Clinton issued a memorandum to department and agency leadership on the subject of the President's Community Empowerment Board.
- March 3 – In a message to Congress, President Clinton certified "that the continued presence of U.S. armed forces, after June 30, 1998, in Bosnia and Herzegovina is required in order to meet the national security interests of the United States, and that it is the policy of the United States that U.S. armed forces will not serve as, or be used as, civil police in Bosnia and Herzegovina."
- March 4 – In the Roosevelt Room, President Clinton noted legislation he signed previously intending to "ensure that fruits and vegetables coming from abroad are as safe as those grown here at home and to halt at the border or the dock any food that fails to meet those standards" and endorses legislation introduced in the House and Senate as the "next important step to protect America's families from food-borne illnesses".
- March 4 – President Clinton issued a statement on death of Fred Friendly.
- March 4 – In a statement, President Clinton indicated his support for the vote by the House of Representatives on the Commonwealth of Puerto Rico and said the measure "does not impose onerous, unworkable, unprecedented, or unconstitutional language requirements on the citizens of Puerto Rico, unlike some proposals that were advanced in Congress."
- March 4 – In a statement, President Clinton announced "that an accord has been reached on Penn Station and plans to restore the James Farley Post Office Building are now underway."
- March 4 – President Clinton sent a message to Congress regarding continuation of the national emergency to Iran.
- March 4 – President Clinton "the 6-month report required under the heading International Organization and Programs in title IV of the Foreign Operations Appropriations Act, 1996 (Public Law 104-107), relating to the Korean Peninsula Energy Development Organization (KEDO)" in a message to Congress.
- March 4 – President Clinton sent Congress a letter on "the 6-month report required under the heading International Organization and Programs in title IV of the Foreign Operations Appropriations Act, 1996."
- March 5 – President Clinton announced the selection of Lieutenant Colonel Eileen M. Collins for Space Mission Commander in the Roosevelt Room.
- March 5 – President Clinton answered questions from reporters on the deposition in the Paula Jones civil lawsuit in the Cabinet Room.
- March 5 – In a statement, President Clinton congratulated "members of both parties in the House Banking Committee who have voted to give the International Monetary Fund the resources it needs to deal with the risks to financial stability around the world."
- March 5 – John F. Kennedy Jr. introduced President Clinton at a screening of From the Earth to the Moon in the East Room.
- March 6 – President Clinton delivered an address on the benefits to the national economy, which he said is "increasingly driven by creativity, innovation, and technology, with high-skill jobs growing at nearly 3 times the rate of other jobs", since he took office in the Rose Garden.
- March 6 – President Clinton issued a statement expressing his support for the Senate vote to retain the Disadvantaged Business Enterprise program within the ISTEA bill and said it affirms the administration's "approach to affirmative action and promoting equal opportunity."
- March 6 – President Clinton attended the Second Millennium Evening in the East Room.
- March 7 – President Clinton delivered a morning Oval Office address on the epidemic of teen smoking and the need for members of Congress "to put aside politics and pass comprehensive bipartisan legislation to reduce teen smoking by raising the price of cigarettes".
- March 8 – President Clinton issued a statement on the death of James B. McDougal.
- March 9 – President Clinton addressed the American Medical Association National Leadership Conference in the ballroom at the Sheraton Washington Hotel.
- March 10 – President Clinton delivered an address in the Performing Arts Building of Housatonic Community-Technical College in Bridgeport, Connecticut.
- March 10 – President Clinton issued a memorandum to department and agency leadership on four steps that the administration can use "to take significant new steps to improve the quality of Federally sponsored child care in the executive branch".
- March 10 – President Clinton attended a luncheon for Democratic Business Council in the dining room at the Inn at National Hall in Westport, Connecticut.
- March 10 – President Clinton transmitted the 1996 Annual Report on Alaska's Mineral Resources to Congress in a message.
- March 10 – President Clinton transmitted "an account of all Federal agency climate change programs and activities" to Congress in a message.
- March 10 – President Clinton attended a dinner for the Democratic Business Council at a private residence in Cincinnati, Ohio.
- March 11 – President Clinton and United Nations Secretary-General Kofi Annan jointly answered questions from reporters on Secretary-General's Agreement With Iraq, the investigation of the Independent Counsel, tobacco legislation, President Clinton's intended visit to Africa, and the peace process of the Middle East during an afternoon appearance in the Oval Office.
- March 11 – President Clinton delivered an address on the observance of International Women's Day in the East Room.
- March 11 – President Clinton issued a memorandum to department and agency leadership in regard to the preservation of human rights for women and announced he is "directing the Secretary of State, the Attorney General, and the President's Interagency Council on Women to continue and expand their work to combat violence against women here in the United States and around the world."
- March 11 – In a letter to congressional leaders, President Clinton said he is seeking their "support in obtaining Senate consent to the ratification of the Convention on the Elimination of All Forms of Discrimination Against Women (CEDAW)."
- March 11 – President Clinton telephoned Lois Capps to congratulate her on her election to the United States House of Representatives.
- March 11 – In a statement, President Clinton said the bipartisan House vote to approve the African Growth and Opportunity Act is "an important step forward on legislation that will open a new era of U.S.-African trade and investment relations" and the bill "would help African nations that are committed to undertake difficult economic reforms to build better lives for their people."
- March 12 – President Clinton addressed the National Association of Attorneys General in the Grand Ballroom at the Washington Court Hotel.
- March 12 – President Clinton issued a statement on the observance of Saint Patrick's Day.
- March 12 – President Clinton attended a dinner in honor of South Carolina Senator Ernest F. Hollings at a private residence.
- March 12 – President Clinton attended a dinner for the Democratic National Committee in the Balcony Room at the Sheraton Luxury Collection.
- March 13 – President Clinton answered questions from reporters on Asian economics, upcoming visits to Russia and China, the peace process in Northern Ireland, China, the legislative agenda, and the NCAA basketball tournament during a morning Oval Office appearance.
- March 13 – In the East Room, President Clinton delivered remarks on the final report of the President's Advisory Commission on Consumer Protection and Quality in the Health Care Industry and announced his intent "to sign an Executive order to all the relevant agencies to make sure they work together to develop the standards" espoused by the aforementioned commission.
- March 13 – President Clinton issued a memorandum to department and agency leadership on the establishment of the Quality Interagency Coordination Task Force and his directing of "the Secretary of Health and Human Services to immediately establish a 'Quality Interagency Coordination' (QuIC) task force to ensure better coordination among the executive agencies with jurisdiction over health programs."
- March 13 – In response to the decision of Representative Joseph P. Kennedy II to not seek another term in office, President Clinton released a statement crediting Kennedy with being "one of the foremost voices in the Congress for low-income housing opportunities for needy families" and thanks him for his service.
- March 14 – Recorded remarks by President Clinton discussing comprehensive tobacco legislation and the need to pass measures to assist with disaster relief in the last 68 days of the congressional term are broadcast.
- March 14 – In a letter to congressional leaders, President Clinton addressed the Senate's upcoming vote on the proposed accession of Poland, Hungary, and the Czech Republic to the North Atlantic Treaty Organization and thank various Congress members for bipartisan efforts to move the measure up for a vote.
- March 16 – President Clinton delivered an address on national education policy and answered questions on the Paula Jones civil lawsuit deposition in the Media Center at Springbrook High School in Silver Spring, Maryland.
- March 16 – President Clinton delivered an address on education and science in the auditorium of Springbrook High School.
- March 16 – In a statement, President Clinton praises "the public health and tobacco producer communities for working together to promote bipartisan, comprehensive tobacco legislation that dramatically reduces youth smoking and protects American farmers and their communities."
- March 31 – President Clinton addressed African environmentalists at the Mokolodi Nature Preserve in Gaborone, Botswana.
- March 31 – President Clinton issued a statement on the death of former Representative Bella Abzug.
- March 31 – In a letter to congressional leaders, President Clinton commended their introducing of the Patients' Bill of Rights and his belief that bipartisan efforts on the measure "will produce a bill that achieves the important balance of providing patients the protections they need without undermining health care affordability."
- March 31 – In a letter to House Committee on Transportation and Infrastructure Chairman Bud Shuster, President Clinton stated the importance of combating continued losses of life by drunk driving and that he will continue "look forward to continuing to work together to make the .08 standard a reality."
- March 31 – President Clinton certified "that no additional B-2 bombers should be procured during this fiscal year" in a message to Congress.

== April ==
- April 1 – President Clinton answered a question from a reporter on the African Crisis Response Initiative at the Presidential Palace.
- April 1 – President Clinton delivered an address to Senegalese Troops trained for the African Crisis Response Initiative at Thies Military Base.
- April 1 – In a statement, President Clinton stated the importance of setting "a uniform standard of .08 blood-alcohol content to protect our young people from harm, make our streets safer, and help us crack down on drunk driving nationwide" and his disillusion with the decision of the House Rules Committee to prevent the .08 legislation from coming to the floor under the BESTEA transportation bill.
- April 1 – President Clinton transmitted the Inter-American Convention Against Corruption (the Convention), adopted and opened for signature at the Specialized Conference of the Organization of American States (OAS) at Caracas, Venezuela, on March 29, 1996, to the Senate for its advice and consent in a message.
- April 1 – In a letter to the Speaker of the House, President Clinton transmitted the Building Efficient Surface Transportation and Equity Act of 1998. Clinton states his opposition "to any attempts to weaken or repeal the Disadvantaged Business Enterprise (DBE) program extension contained in this legislation."
- April 1 – In a letter to Speaker of the House Gingrich and Senate Foreign Relations Committee Chairman Helms, President Clinton submitted a report "on progress toward a negotiated settlement of the Cyprus question covering the period December 1, 1997, to January 31, 1998."
- April 1 – In an interview with Sam Donaldson at the Le Meridien President Hotel, President Clinton answered questions on the Jonesboro incident and his trip to Africa.
- April 2 – President Clinton answered questions from reporters on the civil lawsuit of Paula Jones and the investigation of the Independent Counsel while at the Le Meridien President Hotel.
- April 2 – President Clinton delivered an address on the international struggle for preserving human rights worldwide, relations with individuals from South Africa, and preventing injuries to individuals on the part of landmines at the Hotel Le Meridien President.
- April 2 – President Clinton delivered an address on the history of Africa as well as his visit there in the front courtyard of the Goree Island History Museum.
- April 2 – President Clinton transmitted the Treaty between the Government of the United States of America and the Government of the State of Israel on Mutual Legal Assistance in Criminal Matters to the Senate for its advice and consent in a message.
- April 3 – President Clinton said, "that the unemployment rate in the first quarter of this year, averaging 4.7 percent, is the lowest it's been since 1970" and answered questions from reporters on the investigation of the Independent Counsel, tobacco legislation, and Japan in the Rose Garden.
- April 3 – In a letter to Speaker of the House Gingrich and President pro tempore of the Senate Strom Thurmond, President Clinton reported "on the status of efforts to obtain Iraq's compliance with the resolutions adopted by the United Nations Security Council (UNSC)."
- April 4 – A recording of President Clinton discussing his favor with the "comprehensive legislation sponsored by Senator John McCain, a Republican, and Senator Fritz Hollings, a Democrat, that would cut youth smoking by half over the next decade" is broadcast on the radio.
- April 4 – In a message, President Clinton addressed the pilgrimage to Memphis to commemorate the thirtieth anniversary of the assassination of Martin Luther King Jr.
- April 6 – President Clinton delivered remarks on lowering rates of crime, which he attributes to the implementation of his policies, and the continued resolve of the federal government to combat gun violence in the Rose Garden.
- April 6 – President Clinton delivered remarks to the Major League Soccer Champion D.C. United and answered an inquiry on the peace process in the Middle East from a reporter in the Rose Garden.
- April 6 – President Clinton accepted the resignation of United States Secretary of Energy Federico Pena and states the gains of the Energy Department that occurred under Pena's tenure.
- April 6 – In a statement, President Clinton called the decision by France and Great Britain to deposit their instruments to the United Nations Secretary-General and thereby ratify the Comprehensive Nuclear Test Ban Treaty a "milestone in the global effort to reduce the nuclear threat and build a safer world."
- April 6 – In a statement, President Clinton noted the historical significance of research findings on breast cancer and the "landmark Breast Cancer Prevention Trial gives us new hope that some women at high risk for breast cancer may actually be able to reduce their risk of getting this life-threatening disease."
- April 6 – In a letter to Speaker of the House Gingrich and Senate President Gore, President Clinton transmitted "a 6-month periodic report on the national emergency declared by Executive Order 12924 of August 19, 1994, to deal with the threat to the national security, foreign policy, and economy of the United States caused by the lapse of the Export Administration Act of 1979."
- April 7 – President Clinton attended a National Forum on Social Security in the gymnasium at Penn Valley Community College in Kansas City, Missouri.
- April 7 – President Clinton delivered remarks via satellite from Room 5 at Penn Valley Community College to Regional Social Security Forums.
- April 7 – President Clinton delivered remarks on the economy and the funding of social security while attending a National Forum on Social Security at the Penn Valley Community College.
- April 7 – President Clinton issued a statement on the death of Tammy Wynette, crediting her with defining "the Nashville sound that helped to make American country western music popular all over the world."
- April 7 – In a letter to Speaker of the House Gingrich and Senate President Gore, President Clinton noted his issuing of "an Executive order waiving the application of subsections (a) and (b) of section 402 of the Act with respect to Vietnam."
- April 7 – President Clinton issued a statement on the observance of Passover.
- April 7 – President Clinton attended a dinner for the Democratic Business Council at a private residence in Chicago, Illinois.
- April 8 – President Clinton delivered remarks in the courtyard of Rachel Carson School in Chicago.
- April 8 – In a statement, President Clinton conveyed his satisfaction with the fact that "the United States has reached an agreement with France significantly increasing air service between our countries" and said the agreement is a continuation of his attempts "to open the world's markets in areas where American companies are most competitive."
- April 8 – President Clinton attended the Andrew W. Mellon Dinner in the West Building at the National Gallery of Art.
- April 9 – President Clinton participated in a discussion on tobacco at the Kentucky Warehouse in Carrollton, Kentucky.
- April 9 – President Clinton delivered remarks on disaster relief, tobacco legislation, and crime in the gymnasium of Carroll County High School in Carrollton.
- April 9 – President Clinton delivered remarks to the NCAA Football Champion Michigan Wolverines and Nebraska Cornhuskers in the East Room.
- April 9 – President Clinton accepted the resignation of John R. Garamendi as Deputy Secretary of the Interior.
- April 9 – President Clinton issued a statement on the observance of Easter.
- April 9 – President Clinton attended a dinner in honor of Senator Barbara A. Mikulski at the Hay Adams Hotel.
- April 10 – President Clinton delivered remarks on the peace process in Northern Ireland, announcing Northern Ireland "has the promise of a springtime of peace" following 30 years of conflict, and answered questions from reporters on the subject as well as that of his Easter plans, the peace process in the Middle East, and the reaction to the peace agreement in Northern Ireland in the Oval Office.
- April 10 – President Clinton lauded the thirtieth anniversary of the signing of the Fair Housing Act and noted his proposals for an increase in the civil rights programs of the Housing and Urban Development Department "includes a significant increase in funding for HUD's Fair Housing Initiatives and Fair Housing Assistance Programs that, among other things, will combat racially motivated hate crimes related to housing."
- April 11 – A recording of President Clinton pledging "the continuing aid, support, encouragement, and prayers of the United States to the effort to build a lasting peace and an enduring prosperity in Ireland and Northern Ireland" is broadcast on the radio.
- April 12 – In a statement, President Clinton noted a study he received from the Attorney General and Education Secretary that while showing "the overall crime rate in our schools did not change significantly between 1989 and 1995, it confirmed that some schools have serious problems."
- April 13 – President and First Lady Clinton attended the White House Easter Egg Roll on the South Lawn.
- April 13 – President Clinton answered questions from reporters on a potential trip to Ireland, the American Ambassador to Ireland, his income taxes, and the peace process in Northern Ireland in the Oval Office.
- April 14 – In a morning appearance on the South Lawn, President Clinton announced his nomination of Jack Lew for Director of the Office of Management and Budget and answered questions from reporters on the merger between NationsBank and BankAmerica, and the Director of the Office of Management and Budget.
- April 14 – President Clinton held a telephone conversation with astronauts at Kennedy Space Center in Florida.
- April 14 – President Clinton delivered an address on strengthening the space program in Building 9 of the Lyndon B. Johnson Space Center in Houston, Texas.
- April 14 – President Clinton attended an ESPN town hall meeting on race in the Cullen Theater at Wortham Theater Center in Houston.
- April 15 – President Clinton answered questions from reporters on tornado damage in the Pratt City Neighborhood.
- April 15 – President Clinton delivered remarks in McDonald Chapel, Alabama on the damage done by the tornadoes and the response on the part of the federal government.
- April 15 - President Clinton transmitted a "report on the activities of United States Government departments and agencies relating to the prevention of nuclear proliferation" to Speaker of the House Gingrich and President of the Senate Gore.
- April 16 - President Clinton and President of Chile Eduardo Frei Ruiz-Tagle in La Moneda Palace in Santiago.
- April 16 – President Clinton and President Frei signed a joint declaration during a signing ceremony in La Moneda Palace.
- April 16 – President Clinton delivered remarks on microenterprise in the United States during an appearance in the San Miguel neighborhood in Santiago.
- April 16 – President Clinton delivered remarks to community and business leaders on benefits the United States will receive from the creation of "a special committee to expand the role of environmental and labor groups in our trade deliberations" in the Teatro Municipal in Santiago.
- April 16 – President Clinton answered questions from reporters on his Chile visit, the Paula Jones civil lawsuit, and the investigation of the Independent Counsel outside the Teatro Municipal in Santiago.
- April 16 – President Clinton released a statement on "the tragic deaths of two small children in Arkansas, as well as the deaths of two individuals from Dyer County, Tennessee" and addressed disaster relief efforts.
- April 16 – President Clinton released a statement on the death of Pol Pot, charging the latter "and his Khmer Rouge followers transformed Cambodia into the killing fields, causing the death of an estimated 2 million of their countrymen in a brutal attempt to transform Cambodian society."
- April 16 – President Clinton attended a state dinner hosted by Chile President Frei in La Moneda Palace in Santiago.
- April 17 – President Clinton addressed the National Congress of Chile in the National Congress Building in Valparaiso.
- April 17 – President Clinton delivered remarks to a community in the town square of Casablanca.
- April 18 – President Clinton delivered remarks at the opening session of the Summit of the Americas in the San Cristobol Room at the Sheraton Hotel in Santiago.
- April 18 – A recording of President Clinton addressing disaster relief and the role of the Federal Emergency Management Agency is broadcast on the radio.
- April 18 – President Clinton issued a statement on the death of Terry Sanford, calling him "one of the most influential Americans of the last 50 years."
- April 19 – President Clinton delivered remarks at the conclusion of the Summit of the Americas in Santiago during an afternoon appearance in the Ministry of Foreign Affairs Building.
- April 19 – In a statement, President Clinton noted the occasion of the third anniversary of the Oklahoma City bombing and reflects on the support Americans gave denizens of Oklahoma City in the aftermath of the attack.
- April 20 – President Clinton delivered remarks on the need for Congress to "move forward on comprehensive bipartisan legislation to reduce teen smoking by raising the price of cigarettes, putting into place tough restrictions on advertising and access, and imposing penalties on the industry if it continues to sell cigarettes to children" and answered a question from a reporter on the role of Speaker Gingrich in the development of the bill in the Rose Garden.
- April 20 – In a statement, President Clinton offered his "congratulations to the owners and managers of three of America's greatest landmark buildings for pledging to dramatically cut their energy use" and said the owners and managers have "become symbols of leadership and responsibility in ensuring that our Nation tackles the challenge of global warming."
- April 20 – In a letter to Senate Majority Leader Trent Lott and Senate Minority Leader Tom Daschle, President Clinton addressed congressional consideration of H.R. 2646 and request their support for building and modernizing "more than 5,000 schools across America" as well as "opposition to the expanded Education IRAs in the bill."
- April 20 – President Clinton transmitted the Treaty Between the Government of the United States of America and the Government of the Republic of Lithuania on Mutual Legal Assistance in Criminal Matters to the Senate for its advice and consent in a message.
- April 21 – President Clinton delivered remarks on the legislative agenda for the year and answered questions from reporters on cartoon characters in advertising, bipartisan agreement on tobacco legislation, education legislation, transportation legislation, and tobacco in the Rose Garden.
- April 21 – President Clinton issued a memorandum to department and agency leadership on the subject of streamlining waiver grants and directions he believes will allow the agencies "to adopt some of the best practices" needed to streamline.
- April 22 – President Clinton delivered remarks on Earth Day at the Point in Harpers Ferry National Historical Park in Harpers Ferry, West Virginia.
- April 22 – In a statement, President Clinton commended the House Commerce Committee for releasing documents relating to the tobacco industry documents and states his commitment "to working with legislative leaders on both sides of the aisle, in both the House and the Senate, to enact a comprehensive bill to stop young Americans from smoking before they start--a bill that raises the price of cigarettes, puts into place tough restrictions on advertising and access, imposes penalties on the industry if it continues to sell cigarettes to children, and ensures that the FDA has authority to regulate tobacco products."
- April 22 – In a statement, President Clinton noted the release of a report on the cost of the Quality Commission's Patients' Bill of Rights by the Kaiser Family Foundation and said it "reaffirms recent estimates by the CBO that these protections would increase health insurance premiums less than one percent (less than $3 per family per month)."
- April 22 – In a statement, President Clinton endorsed "the bipartisan legislation offered by Representatives Christopher Shays and Marty Meehan, which is the best chance in a generation for real reform."
- April 22 – President Clinton issued a memorandum to department and agency leadership on the subject of strengthening citizen service and his directing of "Federal departments and agencies to explore additional measures to expand service opportunities for Federal employees."
- April 22 – President Clinton attended the Third Millennium Evening in the East Room.
- April 23 – President Clinton delivered remarks on the Child Care Initiative and answered questions from reporters on tax cuts in the Rose Garden.
- April 23 – In a statement, President Clinton expressed disillusion with Senate Republicans for passing "up a major opportunity to improve public education in this country" and his intent to veto the Coverdell bill in the event it reaches his desk as "it weakens our commitment to making America's schools the best they can be in the 21st century."
- April 23 – In a statement, President Clinton noted his instruction of "the United States representatives to the International Maritime Organization to seek strong measures to protect the northern right whale, one of the world's most endangered marine mammals."
- April 23 – President Clinton met with President of Turkmenistan Saparmurat Niyazov in Washington. The United States and Republic of Turkmenistan release a joint statement saying the presidents "agreed to expand cooperation between the United States and the Republic of Turkmenistan to promote its development as a market democracy."
- April 23 – In a letter to Strom Thurmond, Carl Levin, Floyd D. Spence, and Ike Skelton, President Clinton submitted a report on the Helsinki Joint Statement.
- April 23 – President Clinton attended a reception for supporters of the Omnibus Budget Reconciliation Act of 1993 in the State Dining Room.
- April 24 – President Clinton announced the resignation of former White House Chief of Staff and Counselor to the President and Special Envoy for the Americas Mack McLarty during remarks in the Oval Office. President Clinton subsequently answered questions from reporters on Russian Prime Minister Sergey Kiriyenko, relations between the United States and Latin America, the possible impact on consumers of the agreements between the four major airlines and the administration's response to possible antitrust violations, corporate trends, critique, and the White House Correspondents' Association Dinner.
- April 24 – President Clinton attended a luncheon for the Democratic National Committee in the ballroom at the Sheraton Carlton Hotel.
- April 24 – President Clinton attended a White House ceremony for the National Teacher of the Year Award in the Rose Garden.
- April 24 – President Clinton issued a statement on the observance of Armenian Remembrance Day.
- April 24 – President Clinton submitted a report "on the developments since my last report concerning the national emergency with respect to significant narcotics traffickers centered in Colombia that was declared in Executive Order 12978 of October 21, 1995" in a message to Congress.
- April 25 – In a live morning radio address, President Clinton spoke on the intent of the administration to prevent Social Security from being subject to inmate fraud and keep the federal government "always on guard against every type of waste, fraud, and abuse."
- April 25 – President Clinton issued a memorandum to department and agency leadership on five directions to assist with preventing inmates from receiving federal benefits.
- April 25 – President Clinton attended the White House Correspondents' Association Dinner in the International Ballroom at the Washington Hilton Hotel.
- April 26 – In a statement, President Clinton said the Justice Department report on jail inmates "confirmed the urgent need for Government at all levels to pursue a policy of coerced abstinence for drug offenders" and spoke of "an obligation to install a tough system of testing, treatment, and punishment for drug offenders to prevent them from returning to the streets with dangerous drug habits intact."
- April 26 – President Clinton attended a premiere of Ragtime at the National Theater.
- April 26 – President Clinton attended a dinner for the Democratic National Committee at a private residence.
- April 27 – President Clinton attended a reception for the fiftieth anniversary of Israel on the South Lawn.
- April 27 – President Clinton delivered remarks on the tobacco use report by the Surgeon General, which he said serves as "fresh evidence that those of us in this society who are adults, and especially those of us who are parents, are not doing our jobs very well", during an afternoon appearance on the South Lawn.
- April 27 – President Clinton issued a memorandum to department and agency leadership on supporting the 1998 Combined Federal Campaign of the National Capital Area "by personally chairing the campaign in your agency and appointing a top official as your vice chair."
- April 28 – President Clinton delivered remarks on the report on Social Security and Medicare Trustees, calling it "encouraging" and indicating the essential value "to make certain that Social Security is as strong for our children as it has been for our parents", during an afternoon appearance in the Rose Garden. President Clinton subsequently answered questions from reporters on the visit of Canadian Prime Minister Jean Chrétien, his legislative agenda and social security, International Monetary Fund, and the funding of the United Nations.
- April 28 – In a letter to congressional leaders, President Clinton expressed his satisfaction with congressional approval for "needed funding for domestic disaster relief and defense" but noted his concern with the IMF possibly not being included in the conference report, asserting its exclusion "could undermine our capacity to deal with threats to world economic stability and could leave us unable to protect American workers, farmers, and businesses in the event of an escalation or spread of the Asian financial crisis or a new crisis."
- April 28 – President Clinton transmitted the Treaty between the Government of the United States of America and the Government of the Federative Republic of Brazil on Mutual Legal Assistance in Criminal Matters to the Senate for its advice and consent in a message.
- April 28 – President Clinton attended a dinner for the Democratic Senatorial Campaign Committee at a private residence in New York City.
- April 28 – California lawyer Gloria Allred said she will ask permission to file a "friend of the court" brief in the Jones suit against President Clinton.
- April 29 – President Clinton attended a reception for the United States Winter Olympic and Paralympic Teams during an afternoon appearance on the South Lawn.
- April 29 – In a statement, President Clinton indicated his support for the nine Republican members that have joined as cosponsors of the Patients' Bill of Rights Act of 1998, President Clinton touting the legislation as providing "long overdue protections that Americans need to renew their confidence in the Nation's rapidly changing health care system" and authorizing "patients to see the specialists they need, to get emergency care wherever and whenever a medical emergency arises, to talk freely with doctors and nurses about all the medical options available--not only the cheapest, and to appeal when they have grievances about their health care."

== May ==
- May 1 – President Clinton participated in a discussion with Therma, Inc. employees in a warehouse of the company in San Jose, California. President Clinton began the conference with remarks on the international alliance between the US and other countries as well as what he called an "economic renaissance" occurring in the US.
- May 1 – President Clinton signed the 1998 Supplemental Appropriations and Rescissions Act into law. President Clinton said the legislation provides "urgently needed funds available for victims of natural disasters and for our troops in Bosnia and the Persian Gulf." He noted his disillusion with Congress in regards the legislation's effects internationally but credits their willingness to provide funds for domestic Americans and troops abroad.
- May 3 – President Clinton attended a dinner for the Democratic Congressional Campaign Committee at a private residence in Beverly Hills, California.
- May 4 – President Clinton attended a California Labor Initiative Breakfast at a private residence in Los Angeles.
- May 4 – President Clinton announced the Partnership for Advancing Technology in Housing during a morning appearance at a PATH development site in San Fernando, California.
- May 4 – President Clinton participated in an interview with Al Hunt, answering questions on the economy, the Japanese economy, G-8 Summit in Birmingham, England, the European Economic and Monetary Union, the projected federal budget surplus, Social Security, corporate merging, tobacco legislation, and the investigation of the Independent Counsel along with consumer confidence.
- May 4 – President Clinton attended a dinner for the Democratic Senatorial Campaign Committee at a private residence in Chicago, Illinois.
- May 5 – President Clinton attended the dedication of the Ronald Reagan Building and International Trade Center in the atrium of the Ronald Reagan Building.
- May 5 – In a statement, President Clinton commended "the Annie E. Casey Foundation for its KIDS COUNT Data Book which highlights the need for safe and affordable child care for millions of America's working families."
- May 5 – In a statement, President Clinton expressed satisfaction with the Senate vote to pass "legislation that incorporates the principles articulated" over three years ago with his own proposal for a GI bill and "will fundamentally reform our workforce development system by empowering Americans to gain new skills with a simple skill grant."
- May 5 – President Clinton transmitted "the enclosed report for the Pemigewasset River in New Hampshire" in a message to Congress.
- May 5 – President Clinton transmitted his fourth annual report on the state of small business to Congress in a message.
- May 5 – President Clinton transmitted a message to Congress "on developments concerning the national emergency with respect to Sudan that was declared in Executive Order 13067 of November 3, 1997, and matters relating to the measures in that order."
- May 5 – President Clinton issued a statement on the observance of Cinco de Mayo.
- May 6 – President Clinton attended the White House welcoming ceremony for Prime Minister of Italy Romano Prodi on the South Lawn.
- May 6 – President Clinton held his one hundred and fifty-eighth news conference with Prime Minister Prodi in Room 450 of the Old Executive Office Building. President Clinton began the conference with an address on the international role of Italy and the intent of the United States and Italy to jointly "announce a new joint action plan to crack down on crime rings that smuggle immigrants, bring the perpetrators to justice, and protect the lives of innocent victims" in Birmingham. President Clinton and Prime Minister Prodi subsequently answered questions on the court decision on executive privilege, relations between the United States and Europe, the peace process in the Middle East, the role of Italy in the United Nations, American forces in the Persian Gulf, the American aircraft incident in the Italian Alps, Cuba, capital punishment, the indictments of Hubbell and McDougal, and Kosovo.
- May 6 – The United States and Italy issued a joint statement on the commitment of both countries to the expansion of "the spectrum of our bilateral cooperation in the years ahead" and shaping "a future that is more secure, peaceful, free, and brighter for all."
- May 6 – In a statement, President Clinton praised the Hansen-Meehan bill as legislation intended to "reduce youth smoking in this country" and his looking forward to working with the cosponsors of the measure "to ensure that their legislation adequately protects tobacco farmers and to pass a comprehensive tobacco bill this year."
- May 6 – In a statement, President Clinton said the states of Connecticut and Maryland "have now joined the Federal Government in embracing tough systems of testing and sanctions for drug offenders."
- May 6 – In a statement, President Clinton announced "$8.8 million of new Federal money from the Office of National Drug Control Policy's High Intensity Drug Trafficking Program to fight methamphetamines" and touts the funds as increasing efforts by the federal, state, and local governments to combat methamphetamine nationwide.
- May 6 – President Clinton transmitted "the text of a proposed Agreement for Cooperation Between the United States of America and Ukraine Concerning Peaceful Uses of Nuclear Energy, with accompanying annex and agreed minute" to Congress in a message.
- May 6 – President Clinton attended the State Dinner in honor of Prime Minister Prodi in the East Room.
- May 7 – President Clinton attended the Mayors Conference on Public Schools in the East Room.
- May 7 – In a statement, President Clinton announced "a series of actions to bolster the foundations of peace" in Northern Ireland.
- May 7 – In a statement, President Clinton expressed satisfaction with the bipartisan Senate vote on IRS reform and that "final passage of this reform bill will help our efforts to give Americans the modern, customer-friendly IRS they deserve."
- May 7 – President Clinton delivered an address to the Arab American Institute Conference at the Grand Hyatt Hotel.
- May 8 – President Clinton addressed the Delaware State Legislature in the Senate Chamber in Dover, Delaware.
- May 8 – President Clinton transmitted the Class-Size Reduction and Teacher Quality Act of 1998 to Congress for its consideration and enactment in a message. President Clinton said the proposal's enactment "would help States and local school districts recruit, train, and hire 100,000 additional well-prepared teachers in order to reduce the average class size to 18 in grades 1 through 3 in our Nation's public schools" and called it "an essential part of our overall effort to strengthen public schools throughout the Nation."
- May 8 – President Clinton delivered remarks on the economy and leadership at Dover Air Force Base in Hangar 706.
- May 8 – In a statement, President Clinton said the Minnesota tobacco settlement "will help us combat tobacco industry marketing to kids" and the action "provides still further momentum to our effort to pass bipartisan comprehensive tobacco legislation this year.
- May 9 – A recording of President Clinton discussing the importance of both parents and Congress performing actions to ensure the protection of children is broadcast on the radio during the morning.
- May 9 – President Clinton attended a dinner for the Democratic National Committee at a private residence in Boston, Massachusetts.
- May 11 – In a statement, President Clinton said, "there will not be a meeting today with Prime Minister Netanyahu and Chairman Arafat to launch the permanent status talks" and that the objectives of the discussions later that week between Secretary of State Albright and Prime Minister Netanyahu "will be to seek to overcome the remaining differences so that we can proceed immediately with accelerated permanent status talks."
- May 11 – In a statement, President Clinton said United States Secretary of Labor Alexis M. Herman "is a person of integrity, a dedicated public servant, and an asset to working families all over America" and states his conviction that the Independent Counsel will find no wrongdoing.
- May 11 – In a letter to congressional leaders, President Clinton noted the report released by the General Accounting Office that he adds is "further confirmation of the need for Congress to pass the Safety of Imported Food Act, which I called for in October 1997, which Senators Mikulski and Kennedy, and Representatives Eshoo and Pallone have introduced."
- May 11 – President Clinton transmitted the annual report of the National Institute of Building Sciences for fiscal year 1996 to Congress in a message.
- May 12 – During a morning appearance in Room 450 of the Old Executive Office Building, President Clinton said he is "deeply disturbed by the nuclear tests which India has conducted, and I do not believe it contributes to building a safer 21st century" before delivering an address on international crime control strategy.
- May 12 – In a joint statement, the United States and the United Arab Emirates said their relationship "has expanded greatly to include mutually productive cooperation in the fields of commerce, educational exchange, and security."
- May 12 – In a statement, President Clinton expressed his satisfaction with the passing of the bipartisan conference report on the agriculture research bill and said that the legislation "makes needed reforms and provides funding in several areas that are priorities for my administration."
- May 13 – President Clinton and Chancellor of Germany Helmut Kohl jointly answered questions from reporters on South Asia nuclear proliferation, and the peace process of the Middle East on the terrace of Sans Souci Gardens.
- May 13 – In a statement, President Clinton said he welcomed "the news that President Milosevic and Dr. Ibrahim Rugova will meet on May 15 in Belgrade to initiate a dialog without preconditions" and called their interaction "a sober first step towards resolving a very dangerous conflict that clearly has the potential to spill over into neighboring countries and destabilize the region."
- May 13 – In a message to Congress, President Clinton reported "that India, a non-nuclear-weapon state, detonated a nuclear explosive device on May 11, 1998" and his directing of "the relevant agencies and instrumentalities of the United States Government to take the necessary actions to impose the sanctions described in section 102(b)(2) of that Act."
- May 13 – President Clinton reported "on developments since the last Presidential report of November 25, 1997, concerning the national emergency with respect to Iran that was declared in Executive Order 12170 of November 14, 1979" in a message to Congress.
- May 13 – President Clinton transmitted the Treaty Between the Government of the United States of America and the Government of Saint Vincent and the Grenadines on Mutual Legal Assistance in Criminal Matters, and a related Protocol to the Senate for its advice and consent in a message.
- May 13 – President Clinton delivered an address to German citizens on relations between Germany and the United States as well as the leadership of Chancellor Kohl in the Schauspielhaus.
- May 13 – President Clinton attended a dinner hosted by President of Germany Roman Herzog in the ballroom of the Hotel Adlon in Berlin.
- May 14 – President Clinton attended a remembrance ceremony for the Berlin Airlift at the Tempelhof Airport in Berlin.
- May 14 – President Clinton answered questions on American investment in Germany and accomplishments and goals of his administration during a discussion at General Motors Opel Plant in Eisenach, Germany.
- May 14 – President Clinton delivered an address on European efforts to ensure "democracy, prosperity, and peace" in the 21st Century in Market Square.
- May 14 – President Clinton issued a statement on the death of Marjory Stoneman Douglas, calling her "one of America's greatest environmentalists".
- May 14 – In a statement, President Clinton commended "Representatives Hansen, Meehan, and Waxman for the strong bipartisan support they have marshaled for the legislation they are introducing today to reduce youth smoking in this country" and said the bipartisan measure "contains tough company penalties for failure to reduce youth smoking, full FDA authority to regulate tobacco, strong restrictions on advertising and youth marketing of tobacco products, and key protections against exposure to environmental tobacco smoke."
- May 14 – President Clinton issued a memorandum to department and agency leadership on the subject of personal and privacy information in federal records and puts forth instructions for the agencies to abide by in order to ensure privacy.
- May 15 – President Clinton answered questions on the Indonesia situation, South Asian nuclear proliferation, the death of Frank Sinatra, discussions with Prime Minister Hashimoto, and the economic recovery program of Japan at the Swallow Hotel.
- May 15 – At the Swallow Hotel, President Clinton answered questions from reporters on South Asian nuclear proliferation, the peace process in the Middle East, the Indonesia situation, and his health.
- May 15 – President Clinton delivered remarks on his tenure at Oxford University and how sports have changed since he played at the Swallow Hotel.
- May 15 – President Clinton answered questions from reporters on the peace process in Northern Ireland and the Group of Eight Summit while at the International Convention Center.
- May 15 – In a statement, President Clinton expressed his concern with the violence in Indonesia rising and urges "the Indonesian Government to initiate quickly a dialog on reform with its citizens."
- May 15 – In a statement responding to Frank Sinatra's death, President Clinton called him "a musical legend and an American icon" and reminisces on meeting him after taking office as President.
- May 15 – The United States and Japan issued a joint statement expressing their support and endorsement for a set of "fundamental principles and policies".
- May 22 – President Clinton delivered the commencement address at the United States Naval Academy in the Navy/Marine Corps Memorial Stadium in Annapolis, Maryland.
- May 22 – President Clinton delivered remarks on transportation legislation, which he said "will help our communities to modernize and build the roads and bridges, the railways and buses that link people of our great and vast country together, that keep our economy strong and vibrant", and answered questions from reporters on South Asia nuclear proliferation, school shootings, the satellite launch capability of China, and testimony of the Secret Service in the Rose Garden.
- May 22 – President Clinton stated his disappointment with the House decision to not approve the conference report on the agricultural research bill and his satisfaction with the defeat of a provision that would have been added to the bill, charging House leadership with failing "farmers, let down consumers, and let down the children, elderly, and disabled who need the food assistance contained in this bill."
- May 22 – President Clinton transmitted the enclosed Report to Congress on the Investigation of the Whereabouts of the U.S. Citizens Who Have Been Missing from Cyprus Since 1974 to Congress in a message.
- May 22 – President Clinton transmitted the Treaty Between the United States of America and the Czech Republic on Mutual Legal Assistance in Criminal Matters to the Senate for its advice and consent in a message.
- May 22 – President Clinton transmitted the Inter-American Convention for the Protection and Conservation of Sea Turtles to the Senate for its advice and consent in a message.
- May 23 – A recording of President Clinton discussing steps by the administration to ensure the safety of children amid gun violence and a culture that promotes these acts through its video games and movies is broadcast on the radio.
- May 28 – In a letter to congressional leaders, President Clinton said he has "sent the enclosed notice to the Federal Register for publication, stating that the emergency declared with respect to the Federal Republic of Yugoslavia (Serbia and Montenegro), as expanded to address the actions and policies of the Bosnian Serb forces and the authorities in the territory that they control within Bosnia and Herzegovina, is to continue in effect beyond May 30, 1998."
- May 29 – President Clinton announced the COPS Distressed Neighborhoods Pilot Project in the Rose Garden.
- May 29 – President Clinton announced his support for the Russian economic program of President Boris Yeltsin in a statement, saying it signals the country's commitment to financial stability being strengthened along with encouraging the development of investment and growth.
- May 29 – In a statement, President Clinton said his administration "informed the president of Ravenswood Hospital in Chicago, Illinois, that the hospital will lose its Medicare funding on June 21, 1998, unless the facility takes steps to ensure that the events that led to the tragic death of 15-year-old Christopher Sercye are never repeated."
- May 30 – Recorded remarks of President Clinton discussing the role of religion in the national education system is broadcast on the radio.
- May 30 – In a statement, President Clinton said the United States "condemns today's second round of nuclear tests by Pakistan" and charges both Pakistan and India with "contributing to a self-defeating cycle of escalation that does not add to the security of either country."
- May 30 – In a letter to congressional leaders, President Clinton said he has "determined that Pakistan, a non-nuclear-weapon state, detonated a nuclear explosive device on May 28, 1998" and "further directed the relevant agencies and instrumentalities of the United States Government to take the necessary actions to impose the sanctions described in section 102(b)(2) of that Act."
- May 30 – In a letter to congressional leaders, President Clinton transmitted "copies of my proclamation and memorandum describing the action I have taken, and the reasons therefor, under section 203(a)(1) of the Trade Act of 1974 concerning wheat gluten."
- May 31 – In a statement, President Clinton said the new Russian economic plan "will strengthen the fundamentals of the Russian economy and foster maintenance of a stable ruble."

== June ==
- June 1 – President Clinton met with Isa bin Salman Al Khalifa at the White House for discussions on "the deep and enduring ties between their two nations, commemorating the fiftieth anniversary of the U.S. Navy's relationship with Bahrain and the one hundredth anniversary of the American hospital in Bahrain."
- June 2 – President Clinton participated in a discussion on the 2000 Census at the Magnolia Multi-Service Center in Houston, Texas.
- June 2 – President Clinton attended a reception for the Democratic Congressional Campaign Committee at a private residence in Houston.
- June 2 – President Clinton attended a dinner for the Democratic National Committee at a private residence in Dallas.
- June 3 – President Clinton stated his intent "to renew MFN status with China" and urges Congress to follow his lead during a morning Rose Garden appearance.
- June 3 – President Clinton transmitted the waiver on the most favored trade status of China in a message to Congress.
- June 3 – President Clinton transmitted the wavier on the most favored trade status of Belarus in a message to Congress.
- June 3 – President Clinton transmitted the waiver on the most favored trade status of Vietnam in a message to Congress.
- June 3 – President Clinton attended the City Year Convention in the gymnasium at the Don Shula Sports Center at John Carroll University in Cleveland, Ohio.
- June 3 – President Clinton attended a reception for gubernatorial candidate Lee Fisher at the Cleveland Playhouse.
- June 3 – President Clinton delivered remarks during the WETA performance at the White House on the South Lawn.
- June 4 – President Clinton attended the SAVER Summit at the Hyatt Regency Hotel during the afternoon.
- June 4 – President Clinton delivered remarks to the Democratic Leadership Council National Conversation at the Omni Shoreham Hotel.
- June 4 – President Clinton attended a reception for the SAVER Summit in the East Room.
- June 4 – President Clinton attended a dinner for the South Dakota Victory Fund at the Sheraton Luxury Collection Hotel.
- June 5 – President Clinton delivered the commencement address at the Massachusetts Institute of Technology in Cambridge, Massachusetts.
- June 5 – President Clinton answered questions on the writings of Henry David Thoreau and education on environmental issued in the Education Center at the Thoreau Institute in Lincoln, Massachusetts.
- June 5 – President Clinton attended the Grand Opening of the Thoreau Institute in Lincoln.
- June 5 – In a statement, President Clinton said the now 90 cosponsors to the comprehensive tobacco legislation in the House is a sign of the momentum building for its passage and said it "contains important protections against exposure to environmental tobacco smoke and tough company-specific surcharges to encourage companies to reduce youth smoking."
- June 5 – In a statement, President Clinton said the administration has followed an "economic strategy of fiscal discipline coupled with smart investments in education, health care, and the environment" and called the budget advocated for by House Republicans "an unfortunate step backwards that would mean severe and unnecessary cuts in education, the environment, and health care."
- June 5 – In a statement, President Clinton expressed his approval for the House passage of the agriculture research bill and touts the legislation as restoring "benefits to thousands of deserving legal immigrants who will now be able to rely on much-needed food stamp assistance" and "builds on our success last year in reversing harsh cuts in SSI and Medicaid benefits for legal immigrants that had nothing to do with our goal of moving people from welfare to work."
- June 6 – A recording of President Clinton discussing the status of tobacco legislation and the observance of the thirtieth anniversary of the assassination of Robert F. Kennedy are broadcast on the radio.
- June 8 – President Clinton addressed the special session of the United Nations General Assembly on the effects of drugs as an international issue in the Assembly Hall.
- June 8 – President Clinton attended a reception for gubernatorial candidate Barbara B. Kennelly in the studios of the Martha Stewart Living homemaking television program in Westport, Connecticut.
- June 8 – In a statement, President Clinton accepted the resignation of Secretary of the Navy John H. Dalton.
- June 8 – In a statement, President Clinton said the Supreme Court decision on drug trafficker firearm carrying was intended "to make sure that drug traffickers who carry firearms, whether on their person or in their car, are subject to the stiffest penalties possible."
- June 8 – President Clinton met with President of Mexico Ernesto Zedillo in New York City to mutually express "their satisfaction regarding the convening of the United Nations General Assembly Special Session on Illicit Drugs."
- June 8 – President Clinton attended a dinner for the Democratic Congressional Campaign Committee at the Waldorf Astoria in New York City.
- June 9 – President Clinton delivered remarks welcoming President of South Korea Kim Dae-jung on the South Lawn.
- June 9 – President Clinton held his one hundred and sixtieth news conference with South Korean President Kim in Room 450 of the Old Executive Office Building. Presidents Clinton and Kim begin the conference with addressed on relations between the pair and their countries and subsequently answer questions from reporters on North Korean sanctions, assistance to North Korea, tobacco legislation, four party talks, the situation in North Korea, the Korean Peninsula Energy Development Organization, China, social and economic policy in South Korea, and Kosovo.
- June 9 – President Clinton signed the Transportation Equity Act for the 21st Century in Room 450 of the Old Executive Office Building. President Clinton said the legislation "met the challenge of building the pathways of the future, while maintaining the fiscal discipline that allowed us to achieve the first balanced budget in 29 years and an accompanying very high rate of economic growth" and will strengthen "America by modernizing and building roads, bridges, transit systems, and railways to link our people and our country together and to permit a freer flow of goods."
- June 9 – In a statement, President Clinton said the balanced budget he submitted to Congress "includes an ambitious initiative to make child care better, safer, and more affordable" and the proposal by the House Democrats is similar in that it "significantly increases child care subsidies for poor children, provides greater tax relief to help low- and middle-income families pay for child care, creates a tax credit for businesses that provide child care to their employees, increases after-school opportunities for children, promotes early learning, and improves child care quality."
- June 9 – President Clinton transmitted the Inter-American Convention Against the Illicit Manufacturing of and Trafficking in Firearms, Ammunition, Explosives, and Other Related Materials to the Senate for its advice and consent in a message.
- June 9 – President Clinton transmitted "a 6-month report on the national emergency declared by Executive Order 12938 of November 14, 1994" in a message to Congress.
- June 9 – President Clinton transmitted the International Crime Control Act of 1998 to Congress in a message. President Clinton touts the legislation as "one of the foremost initiatives highlighted in my Administration's International Crime Control Strategy" and its enactment "would substantially improve the ability of U.S. law enforcement agencies to investigate and prosecute international criminals, seize their money and assets, intercept them at our borders, and prevent them from striking at our people and institutions."
- June 9 – President Clinton attended a state dinner in honor of South Korean President Kim Dae-jung in the East Room.
- June 10 – President Clinton addressed the murder of James Byrd Jr., in Jasper, Texas, and legislation for equal pay in Room 450 of the Old Executive Office Building.
- June 10 – President Clinton sent Congress a message on "certain economic sanctions" against the Federal Republic of Yugoslavia in response "to the ongoing use of excessive military force in Kosovo by the police and armed forces" of Yugoslavia.
- June 11 – President Clinton delivered remarks to the National Geographic Society in the Gilbert H. Grosvenor Auditorium.
- June 11 – President Clinton transmitted the Extradition Treaty Between the Government of the United States of America and the Government of the Republic of Austria to the Senate for its advice and consent in a message.
- June 11 – President Clinton transmitted the Convention on Protection of Children and Co-operation in Respect of Intercountry Adoption to the Senate for its advice and consent in a message.
- June 12 – President Clinton delivered an address to the National Oceans Conference at San Carlos Park in Monterey, California.
- June 12 – President Clinton issued a memorandum to the Interior Secretary on his decision to "withdraw from disposition by leasing through June 30, 2012, those areas of the Outer Continental Shelf currently under moratoria pursuant to sections 108-111 of Public Law 105-83."
- June 12 – President Clinton attended a reception for California Senator Barbara Boxer at the Fairmont Hotel in San Francisco, California.
- June 12 – In a statement, President Clinton stated his favoring "that the Department of Justice has reached a settlement that will compensate Latin Americans of Japanese ancestry for their wrongful internment during World War II."
- June 12 – In a statement, President Clinton applauded "the decision by the Federal Communications Commission to move forward with the e-rate--a critical initiative to connect our schools, libraries, and rural health centers to the Internet" and that the program "will help create opportunity in the information age for children and communities all over America."
- June 12 – President Clinton attended a reception for Representative Darlene Hooley at the Tiffany Center in Portland, Oregon.
- June 12 – In a letter to Speaker of the House Gingrich and President of the Senate Gore, President Clinton noted the "elements of Guinea-Bissau's army mutinied and attacked the government of President Vieira."
- June 13 – A recording of President Clinton discussing how glorifying violence has contributed to a spike in its occurrence within American society and the need for Congress to act by passing bills relating to regulating crime is broadcast on the radio.
- June 13 – President Clinton delivered the commencement address at Portland State University in the Rose Garden Arena in Portland.
- June 13 – President Clinton stated that he has directed "the Secretary of Education and the Attorney General to prepare a guide for teachers, educators, parents, and others, that basically goes through the early warning signals that so many young people who are likely to take very violent destructive action often give, in the hope that it will help the schools and the families, and even other students to pick up such signals so that we can prevent these things in the future" while at Portland International Airport.
- June 13 – President Clinton delivered an address at Thurston High School in the school's gymnasium in Springfield, Oregon.
- June 13 – President Clinton attended a dinner for the Democratic National Committee at a private residence in Beverly Hills, California.
- June 15 – President Clinton addressed the Presidential Scholars on the South Lawn.
- June 15 – President Clinton transmitted a report "on cost-sharing arrangements, as required by Condition (4)(A) of the resolution of advice and consent to ratification of the Convention on the Prohibition of the Development, Production, Stockpiling and Use of Chemical Weapons and on Their Destruction" in a message to the Congress.
- June 16 – President Clinton signed the Care for Police Survivors Act of 1998 and the Bulletproof Vest Partnership Grant Act of 1998 into law.
- June 27 – President Clinton attended a state dinner hosted by President of China Jiang Zemin in the Banquet Hall of the Great Hall of the People.
- June 28 – President Clinton delivered remarks at Chongwenmen Church in Beijing.
- June 28 – President Clinton answered questions from reporters on his visit to the Great Wall and appearance at Chongwenmen Church while at the Great Wall.
- June 29 – President Clinton delivered remarks on the development of China's international standing in the last three decades and the role it should play in the upcoming 21st Century before answering questions on improving American understanding of China, security for Taiwan, Japan, and Asian, relations between China and the United States, the education and aspirations of young people, domestic human rights issued in the United States, freedom, and American economic expansion in the Bangong Lou auditorium.
- June 29 – President Clinton delivered an address on the Library Lawn of Beijing University Library.
- June 30 – President Clinton delivered an address on preparing China for the 21st Century and spoke briefly on his retirement plans during a discussion at Shanghai Library.
- June 30 – President Clinton answered questions from callers on Shanghai Radio 990 regarding the Asian financial crisis, library cooperation between China and the United States, educational opportunity, relations between Iran and the United States, automobiles and the environment, cooperation between science and education, response to his visit, and American influence with regard to China and the World Trade Organization.
- June 30 – In a statement, President Clinton expressed his satisfaction with the discovering of the identity of Air Force 1st Lt. Michael J. Blassie as a result of DNA and pleasure "that one more family has finally learned the fate of a loved one, and I remain committed to seeking a full accounting of the missing in action from that conflict."
- June 30 – President Clinton attended a reception hosted by Mayor of Shanghai Xu Kuangdi at the Shanghai Museum.

== July ==
- July 1 – President Clinton delivered remarks to business leaders on American relations with China as it pertains to trade and his activities throughout the day in the Atrium of the Portman Ritz Carlton hotel in Shanghai, China.
- July 1 – President Clinton participated in an interview where he answered questions on his visit to China, philosophies in the East and West, his introduction to China, his similarities with President Jiang, American leadership worldwide, achievements of the China visit, relations between China and the United States, his daughter Chelsea as well as China's youth, and his relationship with President Jiang while at the Shanghai Stock Exchange.
- July 1 – President Clinton delivered remarks on "the importance of homeownership to the future of the people of China and to the prosperity of" China in the Jin Hui Gardens.
- July 1 – In a statement, President Clinton announced "Medicare will cover two new preventive benefits to help detect osteoporosis and manage diabetes" and its "new prevention benefits will provide older Americans the tools they need to fight some of our most devastating chronic diseases."
- July 1 – President Clinton issued a statement on the observance of Independence Day and reflects on the Founding Fathers of the United States.
- July 1 – In a letter to congressional leaders, President Clinton transmitted a report on the Conventional Armed Forces in Europe Treaty.
- July 1 – In a letter to Speaker Gingrich and Senate President Gore, President Clinton transmitted "an updated report to Congress concerning the emigration laws and policies of Mongolia."
- July 2 – President Clinton participated in a discussion on environmental policy in both the United States and China at Seven Star Park in Guilin, China.
- July 2 – President Clinton attended a dinner hosted by Chief Executive C.H. Tung in the Hong Kong Convention Center.
- July 3 – President Clinton delivered remarks on the American relationship with China as the latter country continues its development as well as his conviction in "the openness and the energy of South Korea's new leader, Kim Dae-jung" during a morning appearance at the Hong Kong Convention Center.
- July 3 – President Clinton held his one hundred and sixty-second news conference in the Grand Ballroom of the Grand Hyatt Hotel, beginning the conference with an address on Shanghai and Hong Kong and answered questions from reporters on his trip to China, the constructive strategic partnership with China, alleged Chinese involvement in the fundraising of the 1996 presidential election campaign fundraising, China's human rights and democracy, forced abortions in China, Kosovo, Taiwan and his previous views on China, the peace process in Northern Ireland, the Japanese economy, China President Jiang Zemin, and the constructive engagement policy.
- July 3 – President Clinton issued a memorandum to department and agency leadership on the creation of a Joint Institute for Food Safety Research and outlines the agenda for the institute to undertake once implemented.
- July 4 – A recording of President Clinton announcing, "a new rule that requires warning labels on all packaged juice that has not been pasteurized or processed to kill harmful bacteria" and his directing of "the Department of Health and Human Services and the Department of Agriculture to report back to me within 90 days with a plan to create a new national institute for food safety research" is broadcast on the radio.
- July 6 – In remarks to reporters, President Clinton cited the need to "advance the economic strategy", "strengthen the International Monetary Fund", and "further strengthen families and communities across our country with a juvenile crime bill" and answered questions on fast-track legislation, health maintenance organizations, and the death of Roy Rogers.
- July 6 – In a letter to House Speaker Gingrich and Senate President Gore, President Clinton reported to the Congress "developments since my last report of January 13, 1998, concerning the national emergency with respect to Libya that was declared in Executive Order 12543 of January 7, 1986."
- July 7 – President Clinton signed the Memorandum on Ensuring Compliance with the Health Insurance Portability and Accountability Act during an afternoon appearance in the Grand Foyer at the White House.
- July 7 – In a statement, President Clinton noted the death of Moshood Abiola and urges "the Government of Nigeria to continue and to expedite this transition and call upon all the people of Nigeria to contribute peacefully and constructively to build a brighter future for their country."
- July 8 – President Clinton delivered remarks on efforts to strengthen gun safety being taken by both the administration and members of Congress in Room 450 of the Old Executive Office Building.
- July 9 – President Clinton launched the National Youth Antidrug Media Campaign in the Sidney Marcus Auditorium in the Georgia World Congress Center in Atlanta, Georgia.
- July 9 – President Clinton attended a luncheon for the Democratic Senatorial Campaign Committee in the Marquis Ballroom at the Marriott Marquis Hotel in Atlanta.
- July 9 – President Clinton delivered remarks to firefighters and relief workers on "some new things" the administration is participating in to benefit counties across Florida at Daytona International Speedway in Daytona Beach, Florida.
- July 9 – In a statement, President Clinton said he is "pleased that the Senate has finally passed bipartisan legislation to reform the IRS and strengthen taxpayer rights."
- July 9 – In a statement, President Clinton said he is content with the Senate passing legislation "that is consistent with my view that U.S. food exports should not become an unintended victim of an important nonproliferation law."
- July 9 – In a letter to House Speaker Gingrich and Senate President Gore, President Clinton submitted "an updated report to the Congress concerning the emigration laws and policies of Armenia, Azerbaijan, Georgia, Kazakhstan, Kyrgyzstan, Moldova, the Russian Federation, Tajikistan, Turkmenistan, Ukraine, and Uzbekistan."
- July 9 – President Clinton attended a dinner for the Democratic Congressional Campaign Committee at a private residence in Miami.
- July 10 – President Clinton presented the Medal of Honor to Hospital Corpsman Third Class Robert R. Ingram, USN in the State Dining Room.
- July 10 – President Clinton delivered remarks commemorating the 200th Anniversary of the United States Marine Corps Band on the South Lawn.
- July 10 – In a statement, President Clinton said the bill passed by the Senate the previous night " will help my effort to usher more Americans through the doors of higher education, doors we have opened wide since 1993" and states his commitment to working with Congress on resolving remaining issued.
- July 10 – President Clinton met with Prime Minister of Poland Jerzy Buzek at the White House for discussions on "Poland's anticipated entry into NATO, common efforts to advance regional cooperation in Central and Eastern Europe and steps to deepen the close bilateral relations between the United States and Poland."
- July 11 – President Clinton delivered a live morning radio address on the Justice Department releasing "a study that highlights several areas where we have more work to do" and the need for Congress to become involved through funding "an $85 million testing and treatment initiative like the ones passed just this year in Connecticut and Maryland, initiatives that will help to support even more drug courts, as well as mandatory drug treatment and testing programs for probationers, prisoners, and parolees."
- July 22 – President Clinton signed the Internal Revenue Service Restructuring and Reform Act of 1998 into law in the East Room. President Clinton said the legislation "takes important steps" in building an Internal Revenue Service for the 21st Century and aids "the IRS to serve taxpayers as well as the best private companies serve their customers, building on efforts to offer simple high-tech options for filing taxes and making tax forms more easily available over the Internet."
- July 29 – President Clinton signed the Homeowners Protection Act of 1998 into law. President Clinton said the legislation enables "homeowners to cancel private mortgage insurance (PMI) that they no longer need and make sure they receive full disclosure of their right to cancel."
- July 29 – President Clinton issued a statement on the death of Jerome Robbins and noted his impact.
- July 29 – President Clinton issued a memorandum to department and agency leadership on adults with disabilities having their employment increased and directs the agencies on what actions to take in response to findings by the Task Force.
- July 29 – In a message to Congress, President Clinton transmitted the Annual Report of the Corporation for Public Broadcasting (CPB) for Fiscal Year 1997 and the Inventory of the Federal Funds Distributed to Public Telecommunications Entities by Federal Departments and Agencies: Fiscal Year 1997.
- July 30 – President Clinton attended a signing ceremony for the American Heritage Rivers Designation at the Severt family farm in Ashe County, North Carolina.
- July 30 – In a letter to House Speaker Gingrich and Senate Committee on Foreign Relations Chairman Helms, President Clinton submitted a "report on progress toward a negotiated settlement of the Cyprus question covering the period April 1 to May 31, 1998."
- July 30 – President Clinton attended a reception for senatorial candidate John Edwards in the Governor W. Kerr Scott Building at the North Carolina State Fairgrounds in Raleigh, North Carolina.
- July 30 – In a message to Congress, President Clinton submitted "the attached report providing information on steps taken by the United States Government to bring about an end to the Arab League boycott of Israel and to expand the process of normalizing ties between Israel and the Arab League countries."
- July 31 – President Clinton delivered an address on the national economy and answered questions from reporters during an appearance in the Rose Garden.
- July 31 – In a statement, President Clinton said he hoped "the House will continue this bipartisan effort to give Americans new training opportunities designed for the cutting-edge jobs of the future" and spoke on the legislation's ability to impose job training reform.
- July 31 – In a statement, President Clinton expressed content with the fact that "both Houses of Congress have now passed a comprehensive bill to give Americans new opportunities and choices to train for the jobs of the future."
- July 31 – In a statement, President Clinton expressed satisfaction with the Senate confirmation of Bill Richardson as Energy Secretary.
- July 31 – President Clinton attended a dinner for the Democratic National Committee at a private residence in East Hampton, New York.

== August ==
- August 1 – President Clinton delivered a morning radio address discussing bipartisan efforts to enact legislation guaranteeing a Patients' Bill of Rights as well as announcing "the Defense Department is issuing a directive to make the protections of the Patients' Bill of Rights real for more than 8 million servicemen and women, their families, and Defense Department employees" from the Amagansett Fire Station in Long Island, New York.
- August 1 – President Clinton attended a reception for the Democratic National Committee at a private residence in East Hampton.
- August 1 – President Clinton attended a reception for a Saxophone Club at an East Hampton private residence.
- August 3 – President Clinton delivered remarks on the funding of the summer job program in the Deitz Memorial Auditorium at Prince Georges Hospital Center in Cheverly, Maryland.
- August 3 – In a statement, President Clinton praised the vote on the Shays-Meehan bill as "a breakthrough in the fight for bipartisan campaign finance reform" and called on the House "to move this legislation to final passage before they adjourn for the August recess" in addition to requesting Republican members of the chamber abide by "the will of the majority and the loud voice of the American people" in favor of the bill.
- August 4 – President Clinton delivered remarks on the anniversary of the Personal Responsibility and Work Opportunity Reconciliation Act of 1996 in the East Room.
- August 4 – President Clinton issued a statement on the death of Arthur Barbieri, calling him "a great political leader" as well as friend and mentor.
- August 4 – In a statement, President Clinton indicated his satisfaction with the House passing the Credit Union Membership Access Act and said the legislation will resolve "uncertainty about the future of credit unions, created by a recent Supreme Court decision, by protecting existing credit union members and making it easier for credit unions to expand where appropriate" and assist with putting "credit unions on sounder footing by making important reforms that could pay enormous dividends in more difficult times."
- August 4 – President Clinton attended a dinner for the Democratic Congressional Campaign Committee in Ballroom Two at the Washington Court Hotel.
- August 5 – In a statement, President Clinton indicated his disapproval with the failure of the House "to adopt an amendment to the FY '99 Commerce-Justice-State appropriations bill that would have removed onerous restrictions on the Census Bureau's plan for the decennial census."
- August 5 – President Clinton attended a dinner for Unity '98 in the Crystal Ballroom at the Carlton Hotel.
- August 6 – President Clinton delivered remarks on the proposed extension of the Brady Handgun Violence Prevention Act in the Rose Garden.
- August 6 – In a statement, President Clinton indicated his satisfaction with the House voting to defeat "an attempt to overturn my Executive order providing a uniform policy to prohibit discrimination based on sexual orientation in the Federal civilian work force" and said the vote reflects the values of the nation.
- August 6 – President Clinton delivered remarks to the White House Conference on Building Economic Self-Determination in Indian Communities during an afternoon appearance in the Independence Ballroom at the Grand Hyatt Hotel.
- August 6 – President Clinton issued a memorandum to department and agency leadership on the subject of the economic development in the American Indian and Alaska Native communities and three directions he wishes each one to pursue in order to "continue our focus on infrastructure technology needs and business development".
- August 6 – In a statement, President Clinton said the Shays-Meehan campaign finance reform bill passing in the House "is a heartening sign for the health of our democracy" and "a rebuke to the cynical view that political reform can never happen."
- August 6 – In a statement, President Clinton condemned the refusal of Iran to cooperate with international weapons inspectors, calling the move "another misguided attempt to divide the international community in order to gain the lifting of the sanctions."
- August 7 – President Clinton signed the Workforce Investment Act of 1998 during a morning ceremony in the Rose Garden. President Clinton said the legislation "streamlines and consolidates a tangle of training programs, therefore, into a single, commonsense system", "expands our successful model of one-stop career centers", "enhances accountability for tough performance standards for States and communities and training providers", provides disadvantaged youths with opportunities, and emphasizes "helping people with disabilities prepare for employment".
- August 7 – President Clinton signed the Credit Union Membership Access Act into law, saying the legislation "will restore membership flexibility to credit unions, allowing, for example, employees of a number of smaller companies or members of a number of churches to join together to form a credit union" and provide "important new safety and soundness reforms."
- August 7 – In a statement, President Clinton announced completion "of a major initiative to preserve one of America's true crown jewels, Yellowstone National Park."
- August 7 – In a statement, President Clinton expressed dissatisfaction with "the District of Columbia appropriations bill passed by the House imposes unacceptable restrictions on our Nation's Capital City" and the failure of the House "to fund the much-needed economic revitalization plan for the District of Columbia."
- August 8 – President Clinton delivered a live Oval Office radio address on the terrorist bombings of American embassies in Nairobi, Kenya, and Dar es Salaam, Tanzania and addressed the position of the administration on counter-terrorism.
- August 10 – President Clinton began an address with remarks on the terrorist bombings of the American embassies in Kenya and Tanzania and advocates for the implementation of the Patients' Bill of Rights at the Commonwealth Convention Center in Louisville, Kentucky.
- August 10 – President Clinton attended a luncheon for Victory in Kentucky at the Seelbach Hotel in Louisville.
- August 10 – In a letter to the President's Information Technology Advisory Committee Co-Chairmen Bill Joy and Ken Kennedy, President Clinton thanked them for the Interim Report on their committee's " findings and recommendations on future directions for federal support of information technology research and development."
- August 10 – President Clinton attended a dinner for Unity '98 in the Atrium at the Chicago Historical Society in Chicago, Illinois.
- August 10 – In a letter to House Speaker Gingrich and Senate President pro tempore Thurmond, President Clinton reported on American forces being deployed in response to the terrorist bombings of the American embassies in Kenya and Tanzania.
- August 11 – President Clinton delivered remarks on domestic issued such as Social Security, the Patients' Bill of Rights, and his proposal to add 100 national and historic sites outside the plant of Harry Tracy Water Filtration Plant.
- August 11 – President Clinton attended a luncheon for California Lieutenant Governor Gray Davis in the Grand Ballroom at the Westin Saint Francis Hotel in San Francisco, California.
- August 11 – President Clinton attended a reception for California Lieutenant Governor Davis at a private residence in Los Angeles.
- August 11 – President Clinton attended a dinner for California Lieutenant Governor Davis at a private residence in Los Angeles.
- August 12 – President Clinton signed the Emergency Farm Financial Relief Act into law, saying the legislation will authorize farms receiving market transition payments ahead of their normally scheduled time "in a year marked by low crop prices, a series of natural disasters, and other financial strains in agricultural markets."
- August 12 – President Clinton issued a memorandum to department and agency leadership on aid for employees affected by the terrorist bombings of the US embassies in Kenya and Tanzania and his "directing the Office of Personnel Management to establish an emergency leave transfer program under which employees in any executive agency may donate unused annual leave for transfer to employees of the same or other agencies who were adversely affected by the bombings and who need additional time off for recovery."
- August 13 – President Clinton attended a memorial service for victims of the terrorist bombings at the American embassies in Kenya and Tanzania in Hangar 3 of Andrews Air Force Base, Maryland.
- August 13 – President Clinton signed the Biomaterials Access Assurance Act of 1998 into law, saying the legislation "protects certain raw materials and parts suppliers from liability for harm caused by a medical implant."
- August 13 – In a statement, President Clinton expressed satisfaction with the settlement of several pending lawsuits between Holocaust survivors and private Swiss banks.
- August 13 – In a letter to House Speaker Newt Gingrich and Senate President Gore, President Clinton reported on his "advising the Congress that I have extended the national emergency declared in Executive Order 12924."
- August 13 – In a letter to House Speaker Gingrich and Senate President Gore, President Clinton reported "to the Congress on the developments since my last report of February 3, 1998, concerning the national emergency with respect to Iraq that was declared in Executive Order 12722 of August 2, 1990."
- August 14 – President Clinton attended a luncheon for the Democratic National Committee in the John Hay Room at the Hay Adams Hotel.
- August 14 – In a statement, President Clinton announced additional relief "is on the way to thousands directly impacted by the heat wave in the South and Southwest."
- August 14 – In a statement, President Clinton said the Solicitor General "authorized the filing of a petition in the Court of Appeals for the Fourth Circuit seeking rehearing en banc of the three-judge panel's decision regarding FDA regulation of tobacco products" and his commitment to following the guidelines of the FDA.
- August 15 – President Clinton delivered a morning Oval Office address on his meeting with service members at Andrews Air Force Base two days prior with First Lady Clinton and American commitment "to the fight against terror" that is broadcast on the radio.
- August 15 – In a statement, President Clinton called the terrorist bombing in Omagh, Northern Ireland "a barbaric act intended to wreck Northern Ireland's aspirations for peace and reconciliation."
- August 17 – President Clinton delivered remarks on his testimony before the Office of Independent Counsel and the grand jury that afternoon and called for an end to "the pursuit of personal destruction and the prying into private lives" from the Map Room.
- August 18 – In a letter to congressional leaders, President Clinton spoke on the Justice Department authorizing "the draw-down of embassy personnel" following receiving information of a validated threat to the American embassy in Tirana, Albania.
- August 18 – In a letter to House Speaker Gingrich and Senate President Gore, President Clinton reported to Congress on his exercising "my statutory authority to take additional steps with respect to the actions and policies of the National Union for the Total Independence of Angola (UNITA) and the national emergency declared in Executive Order 12865."
- August 20 – President Clinton stated he has "ordered our Armed Forces to strike at terrorist-related facilities in Afghanistan and Sudan because of the threat they present to our national security" and the attack was carried out by the United States "on one of the most active terrorist bases in the world" at the gymnasium at Edgartown Elementary School.
- August 20 – President Clinton delivered an Oval Office address on his ordering American armed forces "to strike at terrorist-related facilities in Afghanistan and Sudan" out of the threat they present to the national security of the United States and thanks service members while clarifying the act was not an aggression against the Islamic faith.
- August 20 – In a statement, President Clinton announced his "support for a 3.6 percent pay raise in 1999 for Federal civilian employees and military personnel", citing the increase as "consistent with preliminary appropriations and authorizing actions already taken in Congress" and calling for Congress "to enact legislation providing for such an increase" or else lead to his own intervention.
- August 20 – In a letter to House Speaker Gingrich and Senate President Gore, President Clinton said he declared a national emergency and issued Executive Order 12947 "in light of the threat posed by grave acts of violence committed by foreign terrorists that disrupt the Middle East peace process" and reported to Congress on his exercising "my statutory authority to issue an Executive Order that amends Executive Order 12947 in order more effectively to respond to the worldwide threat posed by foreign terrorists."
- August 21 – In a statement, President Clinton said the 1997 National Household Survey on Drug Abuse demonstrates "teen drug use continues to represent a serious and growing problem" and cited this as the reason for his launching of "a 5-year, $2 billion youth antidrug media campaign to use the full force of the media to make sure that our children get the message that drugs are dangerous, wrong, and can kill you" the previous month.
- August 28 – President Clinton delivered remarks noting the thirty-fifth anniversary of the March on Washington in the Union Chapel in Oak Bluffs, Massachusetts.
- August 29 – President Clinton delivered a live morning radio address on "progress over partisanship in efforts to expand access to quality health care for every American" and the need to pass a Patients' Bill of Rights.
- August 31 – President Clinton delivered remarks on what he called "major challenges" afflicting Americans and issued of national security such as his Russia visit in the gymnasium at Herndon Elementary School.
- August 31 – President Clinton delivered remarks on education reform and congressional participation on the matter during an appearance in the gymnasium at Herndon Elementary School.
- August 31 – In a statement, President Clinton said he has asked "Northwest Airlines and its pilots to redouble their efforts to resolve their differences."
- August 31 – In a message to the Senate, President Clinton transmitted the Treaty Between the Government of the United States of America and the Government of the Republic of Guatemala for the Return of Stolen, Robbed, Embezzled or Appropriated Vehicles and Aircraft for its advice and consent.

== September ==
- September 1 – President Clinton attended First Day of School Festivities in the auditorium at the 19th Elementary School in Moscow, Russia.
- September 1 – President Clinton delivered remarks on future Russian leaders and their role in shaping Russia for the 21st Century in the auditorium at Moscow State University in Moscow.
- September 1 – In a statement, President Clinton expressed satisfaction with the "statement by Sinn Fein President Gerry Adams committing to exclusively democratic and peaceful means in the political process in Northern Ireland."
- September 1 – In a statement, President Clinton expressed his belief in the value of Harold Ickes and his confidence in him being found by investigators to have acted lawfully.
- September 1 – In a statement, President Clinton noted the vote of the Senate Labor-HHS appropriations subcommittee "to restore full funding for home heating and cooling assistance for low-income families and summer jobs for disadvantaged youth" and that it aligns with "many of the essential investments in our children for which I have been fighting."
- September 1 – In a letter to Senate Majority Leader Trent Lott, President Clinton stated his commitment to working with Democrats and Republicans "to pass long overdue legislation this year" and spoke on the importance of passing bipartisan "basic patient protections".
- September 2 – President Clinton held his one hundred and sixty-third news conference in the Catherine Hall at the Kremlin with President of Russia Boris Yeltsin, answering questions from reporters on summit goals, relations between the United States and Russia, the economies both the US and Russia, President Clinton's effectiveness, expansion of Russia and NATO, and the political situation of Russia.
- September 2 – In a joint statement, the United States and Russian Federation noted that both their presidents expressed concern that "the situation in Kosovo continues to deteriorate, causing growing alarm among the world public about the growing negative consequences for regional stability."
- September 2 – President Clinton delivered remarks on "a couple of observations about the economic challenges facing Russia today" and his belief in the need for the United States and Russia to become partners ahead of the 21st Century in Spaso House.
- September 3 – President Clinton delivered remarks to the Northern Ireland Assembly asserting American commitment to walking on "the road of renewal" with Northern Ireland in the months and years to come in the main auditorium at Waterfront Hall.
- September 3 – President Clinton attended the groundbreaking ceremony for the Springvale Educational Village in a tent at the construction site in Belfast.
- September 3 – In a statement, President Clinton said the previous day's announcement of Martin McGuinness overseeing decommissioning issued for Sinn Féin "is an important step" in the peace process of Northern Ireland.
- September 3 – In a statement, President Clinton expressed his sadness with the fatal crash of the Swissair Flight 111 and expressed the United States's "deepest sympathies to the families of the passengers and crewmembers aboard the aircraft."
- September 3 – In a letter to House Speaker Gingrich and Senate President pro tempore Thurmond, President Clinton reported "on the status of efforts to obtain Iraq's compliance with the resolutions adopted by the United Nations Security Council (UNSC)."
- September 3 – President Clinton delivered remarks on the peace process and American commitment to securing an end to conflict in Northern Ireland at the Mall of Armagh in Armagh, Northern Ireland.
- September 4 – President Clinton answered questions from reporters on comments from Senator Joe Lieberman, the peace process in Northern Ireland, and military action against terrorist sites in the Office of the Taoiseach.
- September 4 – President Clinton attended a reception for community leaders at the Royal College of Surgeons in Dublin.
- September 4 – President Clinton delivered remarks on the signing of agreements and their contents while speaking to employees at Gateway, Inc. at the factory floor in Santry, Ireland.
- September 4 – President Clinton issued a statement on the observance of Labor Day and called on Americans to recommit themselves "to raising the minimum wage, to promoting training and continuing education for workers, to providing affordable health care to every family, and to building a stronger national community of people who believe in the value of work and who recognize the importance of maintaining dignity and justice for those who perform it."
- September 5 – A recording of President Clinton discussing his trip to Russia and the need to secure "America's hard-won fiscal discipline" through the administration's economic expansion is broadcast on the radio.
- September 5 – President Clinton delivered remarks on progress in the peace process in Northern Ireland as well as American involvement in the matter during an appearance at the intersection of O'Connell Street and Bedford Row in Limerick, Ireland.
- September 8 – President Clinton delivered remarks on National School Modernization Day at Pine Crest Elementary School in Silver Spring, Maryland.
- September 9 – President Clinton delivered remarks at Hillcrest Elementary School in the school cafeteria on accomplishments of his administration including record low unemployment, world affairs, and legislation in Congress to add changes to the education system in Orlando, Florida.
- September 9 – President Clinton attended a luncheon for the Florida Democratic Party in the Lake Ivanhoe Room at the Orlando Marriott Downtown in Orlando.
- September 9 – In a statement, President Clinton declares his approval for the United Nations Security Council voting to suspend the review of sanctions against Iraq for the remainder of the time before Baghdad chooses to resume full cooperation with the international weapons inspectors.
- September 9 – President Clinton attended a dinner for the Florida Democratic Party in the Granada Ballroom at the Biltmore Hotel in Coral Gables, Florida.
- September 10 – President Clinton attended the presentation of the Presidential Awards for Excellence in Science, Math, and Engineering Mentoring in the Roosevelt Room.
- September 14 – President Clinton issued a statement on the death of former Governor of Alabama George Wallace, reflecting on his work with him and the latter's career.
- September 14 – In a statement, President Clinton confirmed his intent to sign "an Executive order strengthening Federal efforts to protect the environment and promote economic growth through the purchase of recycled and other environmentally preferable products."
- September 14 – In a message to Congress, President Clinton transmitted a "report on the Nation's achievements in aeronautics and space during fiscal year (FY) 1997, as required under section 206 of the National Aeronautics and Space Act of 1958, as amended (42 U.S.C. 2476)."
- September 14 – In a message to Congress, President Clinton transmitted "a report of the activities of the United States Government in the United Nations and its affiliated agencies during the calendar year 1997."
- September 14 – President Clinton attended a dinner for Unity '98 in the Dinner Room at the Supper Club in New York City.
- September 14 – President Clinton attended a performance of The Lion King at the New Amsterdam Theater in New York City.
- September 15 – President Clinton addressed the National Farmers Union during an afternoon appearance in Room 450 of the Old Executive Office Building.
- September 15 – President Clinton delivered remarks to the Military Readiness Conference at the National Defense University at Fort McNair.
- September 15 – President Clinton said he has "asked Gregory Craig to join the White House staff as Assistant to the President and Special Counsel, reporting to me in connection with matters arising from the Referral submitted by the Office of Independent Counsel to Congress."
- September 15 – President Clinton issued a statement on the observance of Rosh Hashana and extends "best wishes to all for a joyous celebration and for a year sweet with happiness and peace."
- September 16 – President Clinton attended the welcoming ceremony for President of the Czech Republic Václav Havel on the South Lawn.
- September 16 – President Clinton holds his one hundredth and sixty-fourth news conference with Czech Republic President Havel in the Dean Acheson Auditorium at the State Department, answering questions from reporters on Kosovo, President Clinton's moral authority, President Clinton's regrets and goals, President Clinton's friendships with Mark McGwire and Sammy Sosa, Russia, testimony before a grand jury, the relationship between the two leaders, and President Clinton's initiative on race.
- September 16 – President Clinton transmitted the report of the Commodity Credit Corporation for fiscal year 1996 in a message to Congress.
- September 26 – In a statement, President Clinton charges the Republican tax plan with draining "billions of dollars from the surplus before we have done the hard work of strengthening Social Security" and states his commitment to advocating for the reserving of "the entire surplus until we have seized this historic opportunity to save Social Security, and veto any bill that doesn't meet that principle."
- September 26 – President Clinton attended a dinner for Unity '98 at a private residence in Los Angeles.
- September 27 – President Clinton attended a reception for gubernatorial candidate Garry Mauro at a private residence in San Antonio, Texas.
- September 27 – In a statement, President Clinton noted United States SFOR forces leading a multinational effort to detain Stevan Todorovic earlier in the morning and expressed his admiration "for the SFOR troops who were involved in this operation and who continue to work daily to consolidate the peace in Bosnia and Herzegovina."
- September 27 – In a statement, President Clinton congratulates Gerhard Schroeder in his election as Chancellor of Germany, in addition to reflecting on their own meetings, and said German voters "exercised their democratic right to determine their national leadership."
- September 27 – President Clinton attended a dinner for gubernatorial candidate Garry Mauro at a private residence in Houston, Texas.
- September 28 – President Clinton answered questions from reporters on the Palestinian state and peace in the Middle East during an afternoon appearance in the Oval Office.
- September 28 – President Clinton issued a statement on the observance of Yom Kippur and noted traditions associated with the occasion.
- September 28 – President Clinton transmitted the Annual Report of the Railroad Retirement Board for Fiscal Year 1997 to Congress in a message.
- September 28 – President Clinton attended a Democratic Senatorial Campaign Committee dinner for California Senator Barbara Boxer at a private residence.
- September 29 – In a statement, President Clinton expressed satisfaction with the Senate passing the Higher Education Amendments of 1998 and said the legislation "will save American students and their families billions of dollars in interest payments" in addition to responding "to the challenge I issued in the State of the Union to create a High Hopes initiative, where colleges reach down to middle school students in high-poverty areas to give them the support they need to be ready for higher education; incorporates our ideas on recruiting and training top-notch teachers for our public schools; builds on our efforts to deploy cutting-edge technology so that our students can learn anytime, anywhere; and modernizes the delivery of student aid by creating the Government's first-ever performance based organization, a recommendation made by the Vice President's National Performance Review."
- September 29 – In a statement on the death of former Mayor of Los Angeles Tom Bradley, President Clinton lauded him as "a builder, bringing a remarkably successful Olympic Games to Los Angeles, encouraging a thriving downtown and improving mass transit."
- September 29 – In a statement, President Clinton expressed satisfaction with the Senate passing the Year 2000 Information and Readiness Disclosure Act and said the legislation "will help businesses, State and local government, and Federal agencies better address the year 2000 (Y2K) problem by providing limited liability protections to encourage greater information sharing about solutions, while also protecting consumers from misleading advertising or other statements when purchasing products for their own use."
- September 29 – President Clinton issued a memorandum requesting "the heads of executive departments and agencies who have Federal civilian employees in designated disaster areas resulting from Hurricane Georges and its aftermath (including Puerto Rico and the U.S. Virgin Islands) to use their discretion to excuse from duty, without charge to leave or loss of pay, any such employee who is prevented from reporting to work or faced with a personal emergency because of this disaster and who can be spared from his or her usual responsibilities."
- September 29 – In a letter to congressional leaders, President Clinton addressed the conflict in Liberia and reported on the deployment of American troops there "for the purpose of preparing to protect American citizens and property."
- September 30 – During an afternoon appearance in Room 450 of the Old Executive Office Building, President Clinton delivered remarks touting the economy under his administration as "the strongest in a generation" and spoke on historical records relating to the budget.

== October ==
- October 1 – In a statement, President Clinton noted the anniversary of the launch of the Children's Health Insurance Program and announced that "nearly four out of five States are already participating in CHIP."
- October 1 – In a statement, President Clinton stated his approval for the House of Representatives passing the Year 2000 Information and Readiness Disclosure Act, saying the legislation "will provide limited liability protections for sharing information while protecting consumers from misleading statements."
- October 1 – President Clinton attended a dinner for Unity '98 in the ballroom at the Sheraton Luxury Collection Hotel.
- October 2 – President Clinton delivered remarks on efforts to strengthen the world's economy and answered questions from reporters on the possibility of a worldwide recession, and Kosovo during a morning appearance in the South Portico.
- October 2 – President Clinton attended a luncheon for candidate Mary Boyle at a private residence in Cleveland, Ohio.
- October 2 – President Clinton issued a statement on the death of Gene Autry, saying his "music and movies captured all that was good and inspiring about America's Old West."
- October 2 – President Clinton attended a reception for the Democratic National Committee in Room 201 at Philadelphia City Hall in Philadelphia, Pennsylvania.
- October 2 – President Clinton attended a dinner for the Democratic National Committee in Room 202 at Philadelphia City Hall in Philadelphia.
- October 3 – A recording of President Clinton recounting "steps to help farmers and ranchers weather the crisis" that have been taken by his administration along with a call for Congress to act on IMF airs on the radio.
- October 5 – President Clinton attended a luncheon for Unity '98 at a private residence.
- October 5 – President Clinton called on Congress to act on Social Security, ensure "our prosperity in this turbulent international economy by meeting our obligations to the International Monetary Fund", invest in education, and protect the environment ahead of the midterm elections taking place during an afternoon appearance on the South Lawn.
- October 5 – President Clinton delivered remarks to Finance Ministers and Central Bank Governors in the ballroom at the Sheraton Luxury Collection Hotel.
- October 5 – President Clinton attended a reception for Unity '98 in the Great Hall at the National Building Museum.
- October 6 – President Clinton attended the annual meeting of the International Monetary Fund/World Bank in the ballroom at the Marriott Wardman Park Hotel.
- October 6 – In a statement, President Clinton said the Senate vote on the agriculture bill "failed to provide adequate emergency aid for farmers in this country who are suffering from the worst agricultural crisis in a decade" and urges Congress to both send him "a comprehensive plan that protects farmers by strengthening the safety net at this difficult time" and support his "own emergency aid proposal for $2.3 billion that originated with Senators Conrad and Dorgan to provide farmers with additional insurance and indemnity payments for crop loss."
- October 7 – President Clinton and Prime Minister of Hungary Viktor Orbán deliver remarks in the Oval Office, President Clinton answering questions from reporters on Kosovo, the peace process in the Middle East, his discussions with Orbán, the international economic situation, and the crime situation in central Europe.
- October 7 – President Clinton signed the Higher Education Amendments of 1998 into law in the East Room. President Clinton said the legislation "will enhance the economic strength of America", "strengthen the communities of America", "improve the lives of the families of America", and "widen the circle of opportunity."
- October 7 – President Clinton signed the Energy and Water Development Appropriations Act, 1999 into law, authorizing "$20.8 billion in discretionary budget authority for the programs of the Department of Energy (DOE), the Department of the Interior's Bureau of Reclamation, the Army Corps of Engineers, and several smaller agencies."
- October 7 – President Clinton attended a dinner for the League of Conservation Voters in the Grand Ballroom at the Mayflower Hotel.
- October 7 – President Clinton attended a dinner for the Democratic National Committee at a private residence.
- October 7 – President Clinton vetoes H.R. 4101, citing its failure to "address adequately the crisis now gripping our Nation's farm community" and states his disappointment with Congress for not adequately assessing the "agriculture emergency situation by sending me a bill that fails to provide an adequate safety net for our farmers."
- October 8 – President Clinton delivered remarks on Kosovo, and HMO's and Medicare during a morning appearance in the Roosevelt Room. President Clinton advocates for protection of "Americans who have been dropped by their HMO's and to protect the health care options of all seniors in the future."
- October 8 – In the Cabinet Room, President Clinton delivered remarks on the need to "pass a budget that protects the surplus and still to save Social Security, that keeps the American economy going amidst all this economic turmoil in the world, that protects, instead of damages, the environment, and that gives the kind of priority to our elementary and secondary education that it so clearly needs." President Clinton subsequently answered questions from reporters on the International Financial Situation, International Consultations, and the Impeachment Inquiry Vote.
- October 8 – In a statement, President Clinton stated his satisfaction with the Senate passing the Internet Tax Freedom Act and said the legislation "will create a short-term moratorium on new and discriminatory taxes that would slow down the growth of the Internet and launch a search for long-term solutions to the tax issued raised by electronic commerce."
- October 8 – In a letter to Senate Majority Leader Trent Lott, President Clinton urged him "to pass legislation to reauthorize the Older Americans Act (OAA) before the Congress adjourns this year" and said failure to do so will call into question federal government commitment to the Act.
- October 8 – In a letter to House Speaker Gingrich, President Clinton urged him to "pass legislation to reauthorize the Older Americans Act (OAA) before the Congress adjourns this year."
- October 8 – President Clinton transmitted a report on telecommunication service payments to Cuba to Congress in a message.
- October 30 – President Clinton signed the Technology Administration Act of 1998 into law. President Clinton said the legislation enables "the Commerce Department's National Institute of Standards and Technology (NIST) to better serve the Nation's more than 380,000 smaller manufacturers by eliminating the 6-year sunset provision for Federal co-funding of NIST Manufacturing Extension Partnership centers" and "authorizes NIST to establish a program to help elementary and secondary school teachers to convey to their students important lessons in measurements, manufacturing, technology transfer, and other areas in which NIST researchers possess world-class expertise."
- October 30 – President Clinton signed H.R. 280 into law, reauthorizing the Rhinoceros and Tiger Conservation Act and prohibiting "the sale, importation, and exportation of products labeled or advertised as derived from rhinoceroses or tigers."
- October 30 – President Clinton signed the Identity Theft and Assumption Deterrence Act of 1998 into law, the legislation penalizing "the theft of personal information with the intent to commit an unlawful act, such as obtaining fraudulent loans or credit cards, drug trafficking, or other illegal purposes" and directing "the Federal Trade Commission to help victims deal with the consequences of this crime."
- October 30 – President Clinton signed the Torture Victims Relief Act of 1998 into law, authorizing "continued and expanded U.S. contributions to treatment centers, both in the United States and around the world, for persons who suffer from the mental and physical anguish of having been tortured."
- October 30 – President Clinton accepts the resignation of Kathleen McGinty as Chair of the Council on Environmental Quality, lauding McGinty with leading "administration's efforts to protect and restore our environment."
- October 31 – President Clinton delivered live remarks from Glen Forest Elementary School regarding his concern "about the overcrowding in our Nation's classrooms" and his disappointment with Congress for blocking efforts "to raise academic standards and strengthen accountability in our schools."
- October 31 – President Clinton delivered remarks to community members on the athletic field of Glen Forest Elementary School in Falls Church, Virginia.
- October 31 – President Clinton signed the Utah Schools and Land Exchange Act of 1998 into law, saying the legislation "brings to an end 6 decades of controversy surrounding State lands within Utah's national parks, forests, monuments, and reservations, and ushers in a new era of cooperation and progressive land management."
- October 31 – President Clinton signed the William F. Goodling Child Nutrition Reauthorization Act of 1998 into law, an extension of "the authorization of appropriations for a number of child nutrition programs, including the Special Supplemental Nutrition Program for Women, Infants, and Children--more commonly known as WIC--and the Summer Food Service and Farmers Market Nutrition Programs."
- October 31 – President Clinton signed the Haskell Indian Nations University and Southwestern Indian Polytechnic Institute Administrative Systems Act of 1998 into law, authorizing "Haskell and SIPI each to conduct a 5-year demonstration project to test the feasibility and desirability of alternative personnel management systems designed to meet the special staffing circumstances in a college and university setting."
- October 31 – President Clinton signed the Iraq Liberation Act of 1998 into law. President Clinton said the legislation indicated congressional belief that "the United States should support those elements of the Iraqi opposition that advocate a very different future for Iraq than the bitter reality of internal repression and external aggression that the current regime in Baghdad now offers."
- October 31 – President Clinton signed the Women's Health Research and Prevention Amendments of 1998 into law. President Clinton said the legislation "will significantly advance women's health by strengthening national efforts to improve research and screening on diseases with particular impact on women" and authorizes "several women's health and research screening activities at the National Institutes of Health and the Centers for Disease Control for the next 5 years."
- October 31 – President Clinton signed the Women's Progress Commemoration Act into law. President Clinton said the legislation establishes "a 15-member Commission, appointed by the President and the Congress to help commemorate, celebrate, and preserve women's history in America."
- October 31 – President Clinton and Israeli Prime Minister Benjamin Netanyahu finished "a Memorandum of Agreement on the potential threat to Israel posed by the proliferation of ballistic missiles and weapons of mass destruction in the region."
- October 31 – President Clinton answered questions from Shlomo Raz and Jacob Eilon of Israeli Television Channel on the legacy of Prime Minister Yitzhak Rabin, Israeli Prime Minister Benjamin Netanyahu, the Palestinian National Council, his upcoming visit to Gaza, the release of Jonathan Pollard while in the Oval Office.

== November ==
- November 1 – President Clinton delivered remarks at the New Psalmist Baptist Church in Baltimore, Maryland.
- November 1 – President Clinton participated in an interview with April Ryan, answering questions on African-American support, Republican campaign ads, the sermon by Reverend Thomas, his family, Iraq, and voter intimidation.
- November 2 – President Clinton participated in a telephone interview with Tom Joyner, Sybil Wilkes, and Myra J. of the Tom Joyner Morning Show while in Room 415 of the Old Executive Office Building, answering questions on the African-American vote, 2000 Census, his accomplishments and goals, the President's Advisory Board on Race, Republican ads, voter turnout, and the 1998 elections.
- November 2 – President Clinton participated in an interview with Hispanic journalists initially while being in Room 415 of the Old Executive Office Building, answering questions on the 1998 elections, Hurricane Mitch, Republican campaign ads, California Proposition 10, and immigration.
- November 2 – President Clinton delivered remarks in favor of the Patients' Bill of Rights, promoting it as allowing informed doctors to make medical decisions as well as expressing hope that it will become a factor in the voting of the general elections, during an afternoon appearance in the East Room.
- November 2 – President Clinton issued a statement on the death of General James L. Day, who he said "served his country with patriotism, dedication, and unsurpassed bravery."
- November 2 – President Clinton participated in a telephone interview with Samuel Orozco while in a White House residence, answering questions on the 1998 elections, bilingual education, and immigration and the border of the United States and Mexico.
- November 2 – President Clinton participated in an interview with Tavis Smiley, answering questions on the 1998 elections, his family, Whitewater, a potential right-wing conspiracy, politics of hate, racial politics, African-Americans and the Democratic Party, and a slavery apology in the Cabinet Room.
- November 3 – President Clinton said the administration has provided 3.5 million in resources for victims of Hurricane Mitch as well as its intent to consult "with our friends in Central America and our people on the ground to see what more we can do in the days ahead" before delivering remarks on the economy and answered questions from reporters on the 1998 elections, Treasury Secretary Robert Rubin, Hurricane Mitch, and the sixth anniversary of his election to the presidency in the Cabinet Room.
- November 3 – In a statement, President Clinton said the "agreement on fighting sweatshop practices is an historic step toward reducing sweatshop labor around the world and will give American consumers confidence that the clothes they buy are made under decent and humane working conditions." He credits Senator Tom Harkin with being the first individual to inform him of mishandling in sweatshop practices.
- November 3 – President Clinton signed the Securities Litigation Uniform Standards Act of 1998 into law. President Clinton said the legislation "will help stabilize the enforcement scheme of the Private Securities Litigation Reform Act of 1995 (the Reform Act) by ensuring that parties obtain the benefits of the protections that Federal law provides."
- November 4 – President Clinton addressed the results of the elections, saying the American people were intending to convey, "We want progress over partisanship and unity over division; we should address our country's great challenges; above all, now we must address the challenge to save Social Security for the 21st century." He lays out areas that the administration and Congress must act in and answered questions on the election results as well as Governor-Elect Jesse Ventura in the Cabinet Room.
- November 4 – In a statement, President Clinton announced "that a U.S. team will begin today to finalize an agreement with the Government of Russia on a program to provide at least 3.1 million metric tons of food" and said the agreement will help "Russians through a serious food shortage this winter as well as their country's continuing economic distress" and assist "American farmers and ranchers who have been hit hard by an agricultural crisis here."
- November 4 – President Clinton issued a memorandum to the Director of the Office of Personnel Management on a guidebook for victims of domestic violence and his intent to submit a guidebook on directions to assisting victims in 120 days.
- November 5 – President Clinton delivered remarks on the importance of enacting the Patients' Bill of Rights and how the Democrats believe it is a starting place to appease American people in light of the election results while in the Oval Office. President Clinton subsequently answered questions on the inquiry of impeachment and Iraq.
- November 5 – President and First Lady Clinton presented the Arts and Humanities Awards on the South Lawn.
- November 5 – In a statement, President Clinton announced he has "asked Tipper Gore to lead a Presidential mission to Honduras and Nicaragua."
- November 5 – In a statement, President Clinton condemned the attempt by Iraq to block the international weapons inspectors and called on the country's government to comply with laws stipulated by the United Nations.
- November 5 – President Clinton attended the Arts and Humanities Awards Dinner in the East Room.
- November 5 – In a letter to Speaker of the House Gingrich and Senate President pro tempore Thurmond, President Clinton reported "on the status of efforts to obtain Iraq's compliance with the resolutions adopted by the United Nations Security Council (UNSC)."
- November 6 – President Clinton signed legislation establishing the Little Rock Central High School National Historic Site on the South Lawn.
- November 6 – President Clinton attended the dedication ceremony for the Northwest Arkansas Regional Airport in Highfill, Arkansas.
- November 6 – In a statement, President Clinton said the retirement announcement of New York Senator Daniel Moynihan "comes as sad news for all of us who have worked with him and learned from him during his long career of public service."
- November 6 – In a statement responding to Newt Gingrich's announcement to not seek re-election as House Speaker, President Clinton reminisced on their adversary relationship as well as his appreciation for "those times we were able to work together in the national interest, especially Speaker Gingrich's strong support for America's continuing leadership for freedom, peace, and prosperity in the world."
- November 6 – President Clinton signed the Automobile National Heritage Area Act into law. President Clinton said the legislation "will establish the Tuskegee Airmen National Historic Site to honor the African American World War II pilots who sacrificed so much during World War II."
- November 6 – In a letter to House Speaker Gingrich and Senate President Gore, President Clinton reported "on developments concerning the national emergency with respect to Sudan that was declared in Executive Order 13067 of November 3, 1997, and matters relating to the measures in that order."
- November 6 – President Clinton issued a memorandum to the Secretary of the Treasury and Attorney General requesting both to send him their recommendations within 60 days on "what actions our Administration can take--including proposed legislation--to ensure that firearms sales at gun shows are not exempt from Brady background checks or other provisions of our Federal gun laws."
- November 7 – A recording of President Clinton detailing government officials' interest in strengthening the Brady law and his directing of "Secretary Rubin and Attorney General Reno to report back to me in 60 days with a plan to close the loophole in the law and prohibit any gun sale without a background check" is broadcast on the radio.
- November 7 – President Clinton sent and receives a message from Senator John Glenn during the latter's space travel.
- November 9 – In a letter to House Speaker Gingrich and Senate President Gore, President Clinton transmitted "a notice stating that the emergency is to continue in effect beyond the anniversary date."
- November 9 – President Clinton delivered remarks to the 1998 NCAA Men's and Women's Basketball Champions in the East Room.
- November 10 – In the Atrium at the Ronald Reagan Building and International Trade Center, President Clinton delivered remarks to the first national town hall meeting on trade where he warns that the global trading system is facing the crises of "the most serious financial challenge since World War II" and "the continuing need to put a human face on the global economy, that is, to make sure that in every country increased trade and investment works to benefit ordinary citizens."
- November 10 – President Clinton signed the International Anti-Bribery and Fair Competition Act of 1998 into law, saying the legislation "makes certain changes in existing law to implement the Convention on Combating Bribery of Foreign Public Officials in International Business Transactions, which was negotiated under the auspices of the Organization for Economic Cooperation and Development (OECD)."
- November 10 – In the Oval Office, President Clinton telephoned Second Lady Tipper Gore on damage to Central America by hurricanes.
- November 11 – President Clinton attended a ceremony for Veterans Day in the Amphitheater at Arlington National Cemetery in Arlington, Virginia.
- November 11 – In a statement, President Clinton announced the release of "$1.1 billion in military readiness funding that will enhance our Armed Forces' ability to maintain high standards of readiness throughout the coming year."
- November 11 – President Clinton signed the Veterans Programs Enhancement Act of 1998 into law. President Clinton said the legislation "provides a 1.3 percent increase in compensation payments to veterans with service-connected disabilities and in dependency and indemnity compensation to the survivors of those whose deaths were service-related."
- November 11 – President Clinton issued a memorandum to the Secretaries of Defense, Veterans Affairs, and Health and Human Services on the creation of a Military and Veterans Health Coordinating Board.
- November 12 – President Clinton delivered an education address announcing grants for after-school programs in the East Room.
- November 12 – President Clinton issued a statement on the retirement of Lewis Merletti as Director of the United States Secret Service and reflects on his career and accomplishments.
- November 12 – In a letter to House Speaker Gingrich and Senate President Gore, President Clinton discussed the history of his decisions relating to the national emergency of mass destruction weapons.
- November 13 – In a statement, President Clinton said the agreement between the International Monetary Fund and Brazil "is an important step in our effort to deal effectively with the global financial crisis and protect American prosperity and jobs."
- November 13 – President Clinton signed the Africa: Seeds of Hope Act of 1998 into law. President Clinton said the legislation "reaffirms the importance of helping Africans generate the food and income necessary to feed themselves" and is part of an effort by the administration "to expand our partnership with Africa and complements our efforts to expand trade and investment through the African Growth and Opportunity Act, which I hope will be passed by the next Congress."
- November 13 – President Clinton signed the Centennial of Flight Commemoration Act into law. President Clinton said the legislation "establishes a commission to coordinate the commemoration of this achievement, the benefits of which we are continuing to reap."
- November 13 – President Clinton signed the National Parks Omnibus Management Act of 1998 into law, calling it "a major victory for all Americans who treasure and want to preserve the cultural and natural resources our parks have to offer." President Clinton said the legislation is "the first major overhaul of the way that the National Park Service awards concessions contracts in more than 3 decades" and "ensures that all major contracts will be awarded through competitive bidding and makes concessions franchise fees available directly to the Park Service to improve the parks."
- November 13 – President Clinton signed the Economic Development Administration and Appalachian Regional Development Reform Act of 1998 into law. The legislation authorizes the Economic Development Administration (EDA) and the Appalachian Regional Commission and "recognizes that future growth requires improved physical infrastructure, a skilled workforce, an emphasis on creating entrepreneurial communities, the deployment of new technologies for business development, and a concerted effort to make the Nation more competitive in international markets."
- November 14 - President Bill Clinton settled a sexual harassment lawsuit with Paula Jones by making an $850,000 payment.
- November 14 – A recording of President Clinton discussing disaster relief in Central America and Tipper Gore recounting her leadership of the Presidential delegation there is broadcast on the radio.
- November 14 – President Clinton issued a statement on the observance of International Day of Prayer for the Persecuted Church.
- November 15 – President Clinton delivered remarks on Iraq's decision to cooperate fully with the United Nations weapons inspectors, thereby meeting the demands of the international community and answered questions from reporters in the Briefing Room.
- November 23 – President Clinton addressed leaders of Micronesian Island on its recovery from Typhoon Paka and announced the administration "will fulfill the final commitment made in our compact with Palau: We're allocating $150 million to build a 53-mile road to help you open your largest island, Babeldoab" at the Government House.
- November 23 – President Clinton delivered remarks on Guam and efforts everyone needs to take "to ensure that Guam reaps all the benefits of the post-cold-war world" in the Ricardo J. Bordallo Office Complex at Adelup in Hagatna, Guam.
- November 23 – In a letter to Speaker of the House Gingrich and Senate President Gore, President Clinton reported "on developments concerning the national emergency with respect to Burma that I declared in Executive Order 13047 of May 20, 1997".
- November 24 – President Clinton attended a presentation ceremony for the Thanksgiving Turkey in the Rose Garden.
- November 24 – President Clinton attended a reception for National Adoption Month in the East Room.
- November 24 – President Clinton issued a memorandum to the Secretary of Health and Human Services directing the secretary "to work with the States, courts, private agencies, and others to develop a plan for expanding appropriate use of the Internet as a tool to find homes for children waiting to be adopted from the public child welfare system."
- November 25 – A recording of President Clinton speaking on efforts made toward disaster relief by the administration and requesting Americans "to keep the hurricane victims in your thoughts and prayers and to continue your generous donation to relief organizations" is broadcast on the radio.
- November 25 – President Clinton issued a statement on the murder of Galina Starovoytova, crediting her with making "an immeasurable contribution to the development of democratic values and institutions throughout Russia" and condemns her killing.
- November 28 – A recording of President Clinton discussing the observance of Thanksgiving and announcing "nearly $130 million for new housing vouchers to help people with disabilities in over 200 communities afford housing in the neighborhood of their choice" is broadcast on the radio.
- November 30 – President Clinton delivered remarks on a peace settlement in the Middle East and announced his intention "to work closely with our Congress on developing a package to provide an additional $400 million to assist the Palestinian people, funds to help create jobs, improve basic education, enhance access to water, support the rule of law" in the Loy Henderson Conference Room at the State Department.
- November 30 – President Clinton delivered remarks on electronic commerce, calling for the creation of electronic entrepreneurs to fulfill promises of what data has reported, in Room 450 of the Old Executive Office Building.
- November 30 – Australia and the United States issued a joint statement on their shared belief "that the growth of the information economy is a significant and positive development for both countries and, generally, for society and global business" and give several guidelines both nations intend to abide by.
- November 30 – President Clinton issued a memorandum to department and agency leadership on the commitment to the United States government "to a market-driven policy architecture that will allow the new digital economy to flourish while at the same time protecting citizens' rights and freedoms" and gives steps on assisting with the implementation of his July 1, 1997 directive.
- November 30 – President Clinton issued a statement on the death of former Florida Congressman Dante Fascell who he said "contributed immeasurably to America's national security, to our leadership in the global economy, and to our quality of life."
- November 30 – President Clinton issued a statement on the death of General John Stanford, noting his achievements in both the military and during his retirement.
- November 30 – President Clinton attended WETA's In Performance at the White House in the East Room.
- November 30 – President Clinton issued a memorandum to the Secretary of State on "the functions and authorities conferred upon the President by section 2(b)(2) of the Migration and Refugee Assistance Act (MRAA) of 1962, as amended, 22 U.S.C. 2601(b)(2), to the Secretary of State, who is authorized to redelegate these functions and authorities consistent with applicable law."

== December ==
- December 1 – President Clinton delivered remarks announcing AIDS initiatives in Room 450 of the Old Executive Office Building.
- December 1 – A recording of President Clinton announcing the availability of housing grants for individuals afflicted with AIDS are broadcast on the radio.
- December 1 – President Clinton attended a dinner for the Democratic National Committee in the Colonial Room at the Mayflower Hotel.
- December 1 – President Clinton attended a dinner for the Democratic National Committee in the East Room at the Mayflower Hotel.
- December 2 – President Clinton delivered remarks on the determination of the administration and members of Congress to enact the Patients' Bill of Rights and American voters calling for bipartisan work via their votes in the midterm elections at the South Portico.
- December 2 – President Clinton spoke on the continued relationship between the United States and Pakistan and then answered questions from reporters on the F-16 Aircraft, an impeachment inquiry, a future visit to Pakistan and India, relations between Pakistan and India, mergers, layoffs, and the global economy, discussions with Prime Minister Sharif, nuclear proliferation in South Asia, and Kashmir during an afternoon appearance in the Oval Office.
- December 2 – In a statement, President Clinton said the resignation of Steve Grossman as National Chairman of the Democratic National Committee "is a loss for the Democratic Party" and reflects on Grossman's career.
- December 19 – President Clinton is impeached by the House of Representatives on charges of "perjury" in a vote of 228–206 and "obstruction of justice" in a vote of 221–212.
- December 29 – In a letter to congressional leaders, President Clinton reported on his submitting "the reorganization plan and report required by section 1601 of the Foreign Affairs Reform and Restructuring Act of 1998 (Public Law 105-277, Division G)."
- December 30 – In a letter to House Speaker Gingrich and Senate President Gore, President Clinton reported on his sending an enclosed notice "stating that the Libyan emergency is to continue in effect beyond January 7, 1999, to the Federal Register for publication."
- December 30 – In a letter to House Speaker Gingrich and Senate President Gore, President Clinton reported to Congress "on the developments since my last report of July 6, 1998, concerning the national emergency with respect to Libya that was declared in Executive Order 12543 of January 7, 1986."
- December 31 – President Clinton cited "child support collections have gone up a record 80 percent since I took office, from $8 billion in 1992 to an estimated $14.4 billion in 1998" as proof that administration efforts to make parents accountable have worked.

== See also ==
- Timeline of the Bill Clinton presidency, for an index of the Clinton presidency timeline articles

U.S. presidential administration timelines
Preceded by Clinton presidency (1997)	Clinton presidency (1998)	Succeeded by Clinton presidency (1999)
