= Timeline of the Bill Clinton presidency (2000–2001) =

The following is a timeline of the presidency of Bill Clinton, from January 1, 2000 to January 20, 2001.

== January 2000 ==
- January 27 – President Clinton delivered his final State of the Union Address before a joint session of Congress.
- January 29 – President Clinton delivered remarks to the World Economic Forum in Davos, Switzerland.

== September ==
- September 26 - President Clinton delivered remarks in Georgetown University law school. Clinton talked about the role of government, the spreading of democracy, voting irregularities in Serbia, trade with China, and the inter connectivity of different countries.

== November ==
- November 7 – The 2000 United States presidential election took place. Florida quickly became the deciding factor in the election, although networks were unable to project a winner in the state (and therefore in the election) and a recount was triggered.
- November 7 – The Republican Party won 221 seats to Democrats' 214 in the United States House of Representatives; however, Republicans lost 4 seats in the United States Senate for a 50-50 split, and Democrats thereby took Senate control briefly, since Al Gore was still Vice President from January 3 until the inauguration of Dick Cheney on January 20.

== December ==
- December 13 – The Republican Party presidential nominee George W. Bush became President-elect following the U.S. Supreme Court decision in Bush v. Gore.
- December 19 – President Clinton met with President-elect George W. Bush in the Oval Office to discuss the transition of power between the presidents.

== January 2001 ==
- January 3 – The 107th United States Congress convened with the Republican Party having a 221-seat majority in the House of Representatives, while the Democratic Party briefly controlled the Senate until January 20.
- January 3 – First Lady Hillary Clinton was sworn in as a United States Senator from New York.
- January 6 – In a joint session of the United States Congress, the results for the electoral college were counted. In his role as President of the Senate, Vice President Al Gore read the results and declared President-elect George W. Bush the winner of the 2000 presidential election.
- January 18 – President Clinton delivered his farewell address in the Oval Office.
- January 20 – President Clinton receives and greets President-elect George W. Bush, who arrived at the White House, for the formal transition of power in the United States. He is accompanied by First Lady Hillary Clinton.
- January 20 – Vice President Al Gore receives and greets Vice President-elect Dick Cheney, who arrived at the White House. During the ceremony, he is accompanied by the second lady Tipper Gore.
- January 20 – President Clinton completed his two terms in office and left the White House for the final time as Commander-in-chief.
- January 20 – George W. Bush was inaugurated as the 43rd president of the United States, at noon EST.
- January 20 – After the inauguration, Clinton, now the former president, returns to Chappaqua to begin his post-presidency.

== See also ==
- Timeline of the Bill Clinton presidency, for an index of the Clinton presidency timeline articles

U.S. presidential administration timelines
Preceded by Clinton presidency (1999)	Clinton presidency (2000–2001)	Succeeded by Bush presidency (2001)
