= Timeline of the second Trump presidency (2025 Q1) =

The following is a timeline of the second presidency of Donald Trump during the first quarter of 2025. The timeline begins with Trump's January 20, 2025 inauguration as the 47th president of the United States and ends March 31, 2025. For information on President-elect Trump's activities between his 2024 election and his 2025 inauguration, see the second presidential transition of Donald Trump. For a detailed account of Trump's first months in office in 2025, see First 100 days of the second Trump presidency. For a complete itinerary of Trump's presidential travels, see List of presidential trips made by Donald Trump (2025). To navigate between quarters, see timeline of the Donald Trump presidencies. For a timeline regarding the second quarter of 2025, see timeline of the second Trump presidency (2025 Q2).

== Timeline ==
=== Overview ===
After winning the 2024 election, Trump returns to office for a second term, as the 47th president. His broad and extensive use of executive orders tested the limits of presidential authority and drew significant conflicts with the courts. Other topics Trump focused on included immigration reform, deportations, tariffs, cutting federal spending, reducing the federal workforce, and implementing a non-interventionist foreign policy.

=== January 2025 ===
Date	Events	Photos/videos
Monday January 20	Donald Trump takes the oath of office as the 47th president of the United States and JD Vance takes the oath of office as the 50th vice president.; The inaugural parade is held at the Capital One Arena, with President Trump signing executive orders after speaking to supporters.; The Trump administration shuts down the CBP One program.; Susie Wiles assumes office as White House Chief of Staff, the first woman to hold the position.; The Senate confirms Marco Rubio as the 72nd U.S. Secretary of State in a vote of 99–0, making him the first Cabinet pick in President Trump's second term to be approved.; President Trump formally pardons approximately 1,500 defendants who had been criminally charged with involvement in the 2021 Capitol attack including more than 600 who were convicted of assaulting or resisting police officers, and nearly 175 who used a weapon.; President Trump signs 26 executive orders, repealing 67 Biden-era EOs and 11 presidential memoranda, issuing new directives expanding border enforcement, reversing climate initiatives, eliminating DEI programs, changing the federal designation for the Gulf of Mexico to "Gulf of America", reverting Denali's federal name to its pre-2015 one, Mount McKinley, attempting to end birthright citizenship and instituting a federal hiring freeze.; President Trump revokes the security clearances of 50 people, including former National Security Advisor John Bolton and signatories of the Hunter Biden laptop letter. He also revokes Bolton's security detail.; During his inaugural address, President Trump states that the United States will expand its territory during his second term in office. These remarks are consistent with Trump's previous remarks about annexing the territory of other nations, including Canada.; While speaking at an inauguration rally, Elon Musk twice makes a gesture interpreted by many as a Nazi or a fascist Roman salute.	Donald Trump is inaugurated as the 47th president of the United States. President Trump delivers his inaugural address. President Trump signs executive orders at Capital One Arena.
Tuesday January 21	President Trump and Vice President Vance attend the inaugural prayer service at the National Cathedral.; Vice President Vance swears in Rubio as Secretary of State.; President Trump announces Stargate, a new AI infrastructure company expected to invest up to $500 billion in the sector.; President Trump pardons Ross Ulbricht, founder of the darknet market Silk Road.; President Trump orders the closure of all federal DEI offices, with existing employees placed on indefinite leave and special orders to prevent them from being protected through reclassification or deceptive wording.; Vice President Vance swears in Jon Husted and Ashley Moody to the U.S. Senate, filling the vacancies of Vance and Rubio respectively.; The Trump administration instructs federal health agencies to pause all external communications until February 1 or until communication is approved by a political appointee.	Vice President Vance swears in Marco Rubio as Secretary of State.
Wednesday January 22	President Trump orders an additional 1,500 active-duty troops to the U.S.–Mexico border.; President Trump re-designates the Houthis as a foreign terrorist organization.; President Trump revokes the security details of former Secretary of State Mike Pompeo and former diplomat Brian Hook.; The Trump administration announces the rolling back of an Obama era directive that had protected immigrants in sensitive areas such as hospitals, places of worship, courtrooms, funerals, weddings and schools.; President Donald Trump's national security advisor on Wednesday sidelined about 160 National Security Council aides, sending them home while the administration reviews staffing and tries to align it with Trump's agenda.; President Trump nominates Sean M. Curran, the leader of Trump's protective detail before his second inauguration, as the Director of the United States Secret Service.	
Thursday January 23	Senior Judge of the United States District Court for the Western District of Washington John C. Coughenour blocks Trump's executive order attempting to end birthright citizenship, calling it "blatantly unconstitutional".; President Trump speaks at a virtual event at the World Economic Forum in Switzerland.; The Senate confirms John Ratcliffe as the Director of the CIA in a vote of 74–25, who is sworn in later that day by Vice President Vance.; President Trump signs an executive order to declassify files related to the assassinations of John F. Kennedy, Robert F. Kennedy, and Martin Luther King Jr.; President Trump signs an executive order that backs federal recognition of the Lumbee Tribe in North Carolina.; President Trump revokes an executive order on AI safety initially signed by former president Biden. Biden's order, introduced in 2023, aimed to establish safeguards for the rapidly advancing AI technology. Trump's repeal is seen as a symbolic gesture to differentiate his administration's approach, focusing on what he describes as "AI innovation free from ideological bias."; President Trump revokes the security detail of former National Institute of Allergy and Infectious Diseases Director Anthony Fauci.; High-profile ICE deportations occur in Boston, Denver, Philadelphia, Atlanta, Seattle, Miami, Washington, D.C., New York City, and Newark, detaining 538 undocumented immigrants.	President Trump signs executive orders. Vice President Vance swears in John Ratcliffe as CIA director.
Friday January 24	Ignoring a federal law that requires giving Congress 30 days notice and a reason for their firing, President Trump fires the inspectors general from more than a dozen federal agencies.; In his first trip as the 47th president, President Trump and First Lady Melania Trump visit parts of North Carolina to survey the damage caused by Hurricane Helene in September 2024.; President Trump and First Lady Melania Trump travel to Southern California to monitor the progress of fire rescue services for the January 2025 Southern California wildfires.; The Senate confirms Fox & Friends Weekend co-host Pete Hegseth as the 29th U.S. Secretary of Defense in a vote of 51–50. Vice President Vance, in the capacity as President of the Senate, becomes the second vice president in history to cast a tie-breaking vote to confirm a Cabinet member.; President Trump reinstates the Mexico City Policy.; During a press conference in North Carolina, President Trump reaffirms his stance that Canada should become the 51st state.	President Trump delivers remarks in North Carolina. President Trump delivers remarks in California.
Saturday January 25	Vice President JD Vance swears in Pete Hegseth as Secretary of Defense. He is the first Defense Secretary who did not come from a senior position either in politics, industry or the military.; The Senate confirms Kristi Noem as the 8th U.S. Secretary of Homeland Security in a vote of 59–34.; President Trump delivers remarks on no tax on tips policy in Las Vegas.; President Trump states that he wants the United States to acquire Greenland.; Trump's appointees for the United States Environmental Protection Agency include several officials who have served as lawyers or lobbyists for oil and chemical industries.	Vice President Vance swears in Pete Hegseth as Secretary of Defense. President Trump delivers remarks on No Tax on Tips Policy in Las Vegas.
Sunday January 26	Secretary of State Marco Rubio announces the release of American citizen Anastasia Nufer from a prison in Belarus.; The Trump administration announces that the Israel-Lebanon ceasefire will be extended to February 18.; President Trump announces retaliatory tariffs on Colombia after its president blocked US military deportation flights from landing. Secretary of State Marco Rubio announces that he was authorizing the visa restrictions on Colombian government officials and their families "who were responsible for the interference of U.S. repatriation flight operations".	
Monday January 27	Ed Martin, the interim US attorney for DC, opens an internal review of the Justice Department's decision to charge hundreds of Jan 6 defendants with felony obstruction offenses in connection with the Capitol attack.; Several career lawyers who worked on the criminal investigations into Donald Trump are fired by Acting Attorney General James McHenry, on the grounds that he "do[es] not believe that the leadership of the Department can trust you to assist in implementing the President’s agenda faithfully."; The Office of Management and Budget instructs federal agencies to "temporarily pause all activities related to obligation or disbursement of all Federal financial assistance, and other relevant agency activities that may be implicated by [President Trump's] executive orders", so that "each agency [can] complete a comprehensive analysis of all of their Federal financial assistance programs to identify programs, projects, and activities that may be implicated by any of the President’s executive orders."; President Trump attends a retreat of House Republicans at his Doral golf resort in Miami.; Denmark announces it will spend 14.6 billion kroner (£1.6bn; $2.05bn) to boost security in the Arctic and North Atlantic in response to President Trump's expressed interest in acquiring Greenland.; The Senate confirms Scott Bessent as the 79th U.S. Secretary of the Treasury in a vote of 68–29.; President Trump signs an executive order ending diversity programs in the nation's military.; President Trump signs an executive order banning transgender individuals from serving in the nation's military.; President Trump signs an executive order reinstating service members who refused to take COVID-19 vaccination.; President Trump signs an executive order to develop "the Iron Dome for America."; President Trump fires National Labor Relations Board (NLRB) General Counsel Jennifer Abruzzo, and NLRB Board Member Gwynne Wilcox.	
Tuesday January 28	The Senate confirms former representative and cast member of The Real World: Boston, Sean Duffy as the 20th U.S. Secretary of Transportation in a vote of 77–22.; GLAD Law and the National Center for Lesbian Rights file a federal lawsuit challenging President Trump's executive order barring transgender people from serving and enlisting in the military.; Secretary of Defense Pete Hegseth informs Mark Milley, former chairman of the Joint Chiefs of Staff, "that he is revoking the authorization for his security detail and suspending his security clearance". In addition, Hegseth orders the Pentagon's inspector general to open "an inquiry into the facts and circumstances surrounding Gen Milley’s conduct so that the Secretary may determine whether it is appropriate to reopen his military grade review determination".; President Trump signs an executive order that seeks to end "chemical and surgical mutilation", referring to "the use of puberty blockers, including GnRH agonists and other interventions, to delay the onset or progression of normally timed puberty in an individual who does not identify as his or her sex; the use of sex hormones, such as androgen blockers, estrogen, progesterone, or testosterone, to align an individual’s physical appearance with a gender identity that differs from his or her sex; and surgical procedures that attempt to transform an individual’s physical appearance to align with a gender identity that differs from his or her sex or that attempt to alter or remove an individual’s sexual organs to minimize or destroy their natural biological functions" for "children", referring to "individuals under 19 years of age."; White House Press Secretary Karoline Leavitt holds her first briefing. Without providing evidence, she makes a claim about government spending on condoms in Gaza that is contradicted by USAID.; The US Office of Personnel Management sends an email to nearly all federal employees, offering them the opportunity to resign from their posts from January 28 to February 6 while still retaining full pay and benefits until September 30. The email called for a "reformed federal workforce", composed of employees who are "reliable, loyal, trustworthy ... subject to enhanced standards of suitability and conduct as we move forward."	Press Secretary Karoline Leavitt holds her first briefing.
Wednesday January 29	President Trump rescinds the January 27 Office of Management and Budget memo on freezing spending on federal grants. Press Secretary Karoline Leavitt states that: "This is NOT a rescission of the federal funding freeze ... It is simply a rescission of the OMB memo. Why? To end any confusion created by the court's injunction. The president's EOs on federal funding remain in full force and effect, and will be rigorously implemented."; President Trump signs the Laken Riley Act, making it the first new law enacted in his second administration. At the signing ceremony, President Trump states that he will order his administration to prepare Guantanamo Bay to detain migrants.; President Trump announces that federal employees who don't show up to work in person by February 6 will be terminated.; President Trump signs a settlement agreement for $25 million to end the lawsuit he brought against Meta after the company suspended his account in the aftermath of the January 6 attack on the Capitol.; President Trump signs an executive order creating a task force to plan a celebration of the 250 year anniversary of the United States and revive Trump's plan to create a National Garden of American Heroes.; The Senate confirms Lee Zeldin as the 17th Administrator of the Environmental Protection Agency in a vote of 56–42.; American Eagle Flight 5342 collides with a U.S. Army helicopter over the Potomac River in Washington, D.C., killing all 67 people on board both aircraft.	President Trump signs the Laken Riley Act. Vice President Vance swears in Sean Duffy as Secretary of Transportation. Robert F. Kennedy Jr. Testifies at Health and Human Services Secretary confirmation hearing.
Thursday January 30	President Trump holds a press conference on the January 29 mid-air collision, alleging without evidence that DEI policies were partly responsible for the disaster.; Several senior FBI employees are served an ultimatum by the Trump administration to resign in the coming days or be fired.; The Senate confirms Doug Burgum as the 55th U.S. Secretary of the Interior in a vote of 80–17.	President Trump holds a press briefing baselessly blaming the aviation disaster on DEI policies. President Trump signs executive orders.
Friday January 31	White House press secretary Karoline Leavitt reaffirms that the administration will place tariffs of 25% on imports from Canada and Mexico and 10% on imports from China beginning February 1 with no stated exemptions.; District Court judge John J. McConnell Jr. sides with 22 states and issues a temporary restraining order to block Trump's federal funding freeze.; The Justice Department fires over a dozen federal prosecutors who worked on January 6 cases. Emil Bove, the number 2 official at the DOJ, offered no evidence the attorneys did anything improper, instead citing a technicality for the reason of their dismissal.; President Trump announces he will impose tariffs on the European Union.; Federal employees at multiple agencies are ordered to remove preferred gender pronouns from their email signatures.	Press Secretary Karoline Leavitt briefs members of the media.

=== February 2025 ===
Date	Events	Photos/videos
Saturday February 1	President Trump orders airstrikes in Somalia, targeting a senior Islamic State attack planner and other members of the militant group.; Treasury Secretary Scott Bessent gives representatives of the Department of Government Efficiency access to the Federal Payment System, handing Elon Musk a powerful tool to monitor and potentially limit government spending.; President Trump fires the director of the Consumer Financial Protection Bureau Rohit Chopra.; MS NOW reports that all six of top executives at the FBI and multiple field office leaders have been fired.; Defense Secretary Pete Hegseth cancels "identity months" for Department of Defense employees, including Black History Month, Asian American and Pacific Islander Heritage Month, National American Indian Heritage Month, LGBTQ Pride Month, Women's History Month, Juneteenth, Martin Luther King Jr. Day and Holocaust Remembrance Day.; Canadian prime minister Justin Trudeau announces that Canada will respond to President Trump's decision to enact a 25% tariff on Canadian exports to the U.S. by implementing a retaliatory 25% tariff against $155 billion in U.S. goods.; Mexican president Claudia Sheinbaum announces that Mexico will respond to President Trump's decision to enact a 25% tariff on Mexican exports to the U.S. by implementing a retaliatory 25% tariff against $322 billion in U.S. goods.	
Sunday February 2	China's Ministry of Commerce announces plans to file a legal case against the US at the World Trade Organization in response to President Trump's decision to impose 10 percent tariffs on Chinese exports to the United States.; On a trip to Panama, US Secretary of State Marco Rubio demands that Panama make "immediate changes" to what he calls the "influence and control" of China over the Panama Canal.; The Trump administration ends the Temporary protected status of more than 300,000 Venezuelans.	Secretary Rubio meets with Panamanian president Mulino.
Monday February 3	Following recent executive orders, various government agencies delete various federal web pages and data.; Secretary of State Marco Rubio announces that he is the acting head of USAID as Elon Musk and the Department of Government Efficiency propose to shut it down.; President Trump signs an executive order for the creation of a government-controlled wealth fund by the Treasury Department and the Commerce Department, potentially to aid in purchasing TikTok.; Mexico agrees to send 10,000 troops to the Mexico–United States border in exchange for a pause on the tariffs that would have been implemented early Tuesday. The agreement puts the tariffs on hold for a month while negotiations continue.; Vice President Vance visits East Palestine, Ohio, on the two-year anniversary of the 2023 train derailment and subsequent release of hazardous materials.; Canada reaches an agreement to delay the tariffs that would have been implemented early Tuesday by 30 days to allow for negotiations.; President Trump honors the Stanley Cup champions Florida Panthers in a ceremony at the White House.; The Senate confirms Chris Wright as the 17th U.S. Secretary of Energy in a vote of 59–38.; Secretary Rubio meets with Salvadoran president Nayib Bukele during his trip to El Salvador, where Bukele offers to house "dangerous American criminals" and deportees of any nationality in his country's jails. Rubio calls the offer "an act of extraordinary friendship."	Secretary Rubio meets with Salvadoran president Bukele. President Trump signs executive orders.
Tuesday February 4	The 10% tariff on all Chinese goods goes into effect at 12:01 am EST, which President Trump calls the "opening salvo".; China announces a retaliatory 15% tariff on coal and liquefied natural gas products as well as a 10% tariff on crude oil, agricultural machinery and large-engine cars imported from the United States, effective February 10.; USAID announces that all of its direct-hire personnel "will be placed on administrative leave globally, with the exception of designated personnel responsible for mission-critical functions, core leadership and specially designated programs."; The Senate confirms Doug Collins as the 12th U.S. Secretary of Veterans Affairs in a vote of 77–23 and Pam Bondi as the 87th U.S. Attorney General in a vote of 54–46.; Trump signs an executive order pulling the United States out of the United Nations Human Rights Council. The UN noted that, since the US's term on the council ended on Jan 1, it is not possible to withdraw from a body it is not longer a part of.; President Trump holds a bilateral meeting and joint press conference with Israeli prime minister Benjamin Netanyahu at the White House. Netanyahu is the first foreign leader to visit Trump since his inauguration. President Trump called for the permanent removal of Palestinian citizens from the Gaza Strip, saying the United States will "take over" and "own" the Gaza Strip.	A Joint Press Conference between President Trump and Israeli prime minister Benjamin Netanyahu President Trump signs executive orders.
Wednesday February 5	Trump impeachment defense attorney and election denier Pam Bondi is sworn in as the 87th U.S. Attorney General.; In an internal memo, Attorney General Pam Bondi announces that the Justice Department will "shift focus away from investigations and cases" enforcing the Foreign Corrupt Practices Act, unless they are "related to foreign bribery that facilitates the criminal operations of Cartels and TCOs".; The New York Times reports that, complying with an administration order to shrink the federal workforce, the Central Intelligence Agency sent the names of recently hired employees to the Office of Personnel Management via an unclassified email, potentially exposing the identities of operatives and analysts.; The Senate confirms Scott Turner as the 19th U.S. Secretary of Housing and Urban Development in a vote of 55–44.; Israeli prime minister Netanyahu meets with Vice President Vance and National Security Advisor Michael Waltz.; Protests occur in cities across the US against Trump, his administration, Elon Musk, and Project 2025.; President Trump signs an executive order entitled "Keeping Men Out of Women’s Sports". The order states that federal funding will be removed from educational institutions that allow transgender women or girls to play on women's or girls' sports teams.	President Trump participates in the swearing-in of Attorney General Bondi Anti-Trump protest in Ohio President Trump signs an executive order banning transgender women from competing in woman's sports
Thursday February 6	The Senate confirms Russell Vought as the 44th Director of the OMB in a party-line vote of 53–47. Vought is a Christian Nationalist and one the chief architects of Project 2025.; Attorney General Pam Bondi disbands the FBI's Foreign Influence Task Force and scales back enforcement of the Foreign Agents Registration Act. Both were efforts to investigate foreign countries from influencing American election, which the Trump campaign has run afoul of in the past.	
Friday February 7	President Trump holds a bilateral meeting and joint press conference with Japanese prime minister Shigeru Ishiba at the White House.; President Trump announces his intention to dismiss the board members at the John F. Kennedy Center for the Performing Arts and appoint himself as chairman.; William J. Bosanko becomes Acting Archivist of the United States after Colleen Joy Shogan is dismissed.; President Trump revokes security clearance and daily intelligence briefing of former president Joe Biden.; FISC judge Carl J. Nichols places a temporary restraining order upon the firing of USAID personnel, lasting until February 14.; On orders of Defense Secretary Pete Hegseth news organizations such as CNN, The Hill and others were removed from the press workspaces at the Pentagon to be replaced with "more friendly outlets" such as Newsmax and the Daily Caller.	President Trump and Japanese prime minister Shigeru Ishiba
Saturday February 8	Protests against the Trump administration continue to occur throughout the United States.; OMB Director Russell Vought sends an email to the Consumer Financial Protection Bureau instructing them immediately cease "all supervision and examination activity" and "all stakeholder engagement." effectively halting the agency's work.	
Sunday February 9	President Trump signs a proclamation designating February 9, 2025, as "Gulf of America Day" while flying over the gulf from Palm Beach, Florida to New Orleans to attend Super Bowl LIX.; During the Super Bowl LIX pre-game show, Fox News airs an interview between anchor Bret Baier and President Trump. Trump becomes the first sitting president to attend a Super Bowl.; President Trump instructs the Treasury secretary to stop minting new pennies.	President Trump attends the Super Bowl.
Monday February 10	In an internal memo, Acting Deputy Attorney General Emil Bove, on behalf of Attorney General Pam Bondi, orders the US attorney for the Southern District of New York, Danielle Sassoon, to dismiss the pending criminal charges against New York City mayor Eric Adams for bribery, solicitation, conspiracy and wire fraud, on the condition that Adams agree in writing to dismissal without prejudice. Bove additionally instructs that the matter be reviewed after the 2025 New York City mayoral election has taken place. Bove clarified that "[t]he Justice Department has reached this conclusion without assessing the strength of the evidence or the legal theories on which the case is based".; Judge John J. McConnell Jr. orders the Trump administration to restore certain federal funds that were the subject of a funding freeze.; President Trump imposes a 25% tariff on all foreign imports of steel and aluminum to the United States.	
Tuesday February 11	President Trump holds a bilateral meeting with King Abdullah II of Jordan.; U.S. citizen Marc Fogel is released from a Russian prison following a deal struck by Steve Witkoff. In exchange, the United States releases Alexander Vinnik, a Russian citizen who had been accused of money laundering.; President Trump signs an executive order alongside Elon Musk instructing federal agencies to cooperate with the Department of Government Efficiency.; The Associated Press is informed by the White House that it would be barred from accessing press pool events, such as briefings in the Oval Office or on Air Force One, if it does not align its editorial standards to rename the Gulf of Mexico to the "Gulf of America".	President Trump with King Abdullah of Jordan President Trump greets and welcomes Marc Fogel back into the United States. President Trump signs executive orders alongside Elon Musk in the Oval Office.
Wednesday February 12	Danielle Sassoon, the US attorney for the Southern District of New York, refuses to dismiss the criminal charges against New York City mayor Eric Adams and offers her resignation in a letter submitted to Attorney General Pam Bondi.; The Senate confirms Tulsi Gabbard as the 8th Director of National Intelligence in a vote of 52–48. Gabbard is sworn in by Attorney General Bondi.; President Trump speaks with Russian president Vladimir Putin over the phone, agreeing to begin negotiations to end the Russian invasion of Ukraine.; The Kennedy Center board, now made up entirely of Trump appointees, unanimously votes to elect President Trump as its chairman.; A group of Democratic Senators launch a probe into the private, partisan organization Freedom 250 over questions of transparency, potential conflicts of interest, and potential federal bribery.	
Thursday February 13	Emil Bove, the Acting Deputy Attorney General, sends a letter accepting the resignation offer of US attorney for the Southern District of New York Danielle Sassoon, accusing her of having "lost sight of the oath that [she] took when [she] started at the Department of Justice by suggesting that you retain discretion to interpret the Constitution in a manner inconsistent with the policies of a democratically elected President and a Senate-confirmed Attorney General." Bove additionally informs Sassoon that her conduct will be investigated and evaluated by the Office of the Attorney General, pursuant to Executive Order 14147, after which "the Attorney General will determine whether termination or some other action is appropriate."; Hagan Scotten, an Assistant United States Attorney for the Southern District of New York, resigns in protest of Acting Deputy Attorney General Emil Bove's order to dismiss charges against New York City mayor Eric Adams.; As part of a DOGE purge of the Department of Energy, as many as 350 employees of the National Nuclear Security Administration were fired, including approximately 100 at the Pantex facility, where employees with the highest clearance levels reassemble and dismantle nuclear warheads.; The Senate confirms conspiracy theorist and anti-vaccine activist Robert F. Kennedy Jr. as the 26th United States Secretary of Health and Human Services in a vote of 52–48 and Brooke Rollins as the 33rd United States Secretary of Agriculture in a vote of 72–28.; President Trump holds a bilateral meeting and joint press conference with Indian prime minister Narendra Modi at the White House.; Robert F. Kennedy Jr. is sworn in as the 26th United States Secretary of Health and Human Services.; The National Park Service removes all references to transgender people from the Stonewall National Monument website. The monument commemorates the Stonewall riots in which trans women played a key role.	Robert F. Kennedy Jr. is sworn in as the 26th United States Secretary of Health and Human Services A Joint Press Conference between President Trump and Indian prime minister Narendra Modi
Friday February 14	After a video call with Emil Bove, the Acting Deputy Attorney General, and twenty other Justice Department lawyers, Ed Sullivan volunteers to sign the motion to dismiss the federal indictment against New York City mayor Eric Adams, as requested by Attorney General Bondi on February 10, for the purpose of protecting his co-workers from losing their positions at the DOJ.; The Associated Press is indefinitely banned from the Oval Office and Air Force One for using the term "Gulf of Mexico" instead of "Gulf of America".; After an outcry raising issues of safety and security, Teresa Robbins, acting director of the National Nuclear Security Administration sends a memo rescinding yesterday's DOGE firing of hundreds of nuclear assembly employees.; Vice President Vance attends the Munich Security Conference and meets with Ukrainian president Volodymyr Zelenskyy.	Vice President Vance delivers remarks at the Munich Security Conference. Ukrainian and US delegations meet at the 2025 Munich Security Conference.
Saturday February 15	President Trump tours a Boeing airplane to highlight the company's delay in delivering a new Air Force One jet.; Secretary Rubio visits Israel, meeting with Prime Minister Netanyahu and President Isaac Herzog in Jerusalem.; Trump posts a quote, widely attributed to dictator Napoleon Bonaparte, seemingly implying that laws do not apply to him. The quote reads, "He who saves his Country does not violate any Law." The post drew comparisons to authoritarianism and accusations of acting like a dictator.	
Sunday February 16	Marco Rubio replaces William J. Bosanko as acting archivist of the United States.; President Trump attends the 2025 Daytona 500.	President Trump attends the Daytona 500.
Monday February 17	Secretary of State Rubio holds a diplomatic meeting in Riyadh with Saudi crown prince Mohammed bin Salman.; "No Kings on President's Day" marches against Trump and Elon Musk organized by the 50501 movement draw thousands in D.C. and locations across the country.	50501 protest against fascism at the Ohio Statehouse in Columbus, Ohio on Feb 17, 2025
Tuesday February 18	Secretary of State Rubio remains in Riyadh to meet with Russian foreign minister Sergey Lavrov to initiate peace talks regarding the Russian invasion of Ukraine.; The Senate confirms Howard Lutnick as the 41st United States Secretary of Commerce in a vote of 51–45.	U.S., Saudi, and Russian officials meet in Riyadh. President Trump signs executive orders.
Wednesday February 19	The Senate confirms Kelly Loeffler as the 28th Administrator of the Small Business Administration in a vote of 52–46.	
Thursday February 20	The Senate confirms Trump loyalist and conspiracy theorist Kash Patel as the Director of the FBI in a vote of 51–49.; The Trump administration reveals plans to fire 6,000 employees at the Internal Revenue Service, eliminating nearly 6% of the entire agency. The layoffs are said to target employees hired as part of an expansion by President Biden, who aimed to expand enforcement efforts on wealthy taxpayers. In fiscal year 2025, revenue from audits plunge 35%, representing billions of dollars in uncollected taxes.; Ignoring warnings that cuts to USAID will cause the deaths of hundreds of thousands, DOGE is on track to eliminate 90% of the agency's work. DOGE staffers celebrate with cake.	
Friday February 21	When asked on Fox News whether the DOJ would publish the Epstein client list, Pam Bondi answered: "It's sitting on my desk right now to review. That's been a directive by President Trump. I'm reviewing that."; President Trump dismisses Charles Q. Brown Jr. from the post of chairman of the Joint Chiefs of Staff, nominating retired Air Force Lt. Gen. John Dan "Razin" Caine to take his place.; Secretary of Defense Pete Hegseth dismisses Admiral Lisa Franchetti, the Chief of the Navy, and General James Slife.; Kash Patel is sworn in as the Director of the FBI by Attorney General Pam Bondi.; During a bipartisan meeting of state governors, Trump gets into an argument with Maine Governor Janet Mills over Trump's executive order banning transgender athletes from women's sports. Trump tells her "You better comply, because otherwise you’re not getting any federal funding". Mills replies, "See you in court."; The Associated Press sues the administration over the recent ban from the White House press pool for not calling the Gulf of Mexico by the White House's preferred name, saying the ban violates the First Amendment.	Kash Patel is sworn in as Director of the Federal Bureau of Investigation.
Saturday February 22	President Trump delivers a speech in National Harbor, Maryland to the 2025 Conservative Political Action Conference.; Laid-off National Park Service employees at Yosemite National Park hang a U.S. flag upside down in protest from the summit of the 3,000-foot vertical rock formation known as El Capitan,	President Trump at the 2025 CPAC
Sunday February 23	In a Truth Social post, President Trump announces the appointment of podcaster Dan Bongino as Deputy Director of the FBI.	
Monday February 24	President Trump holds a bilateral meeting and joint press conference with French president Emmanuel Macron at the White House.; Howard Lutnick is sworn in as the 41st United States Secretary of Commerce.; FBI Director Kash Patel is sworn in as acting director of the Bureau of Alcohol, Tobacco, Firearms and Explosives.; The United States sides with Russia, North Korea and other Russian allies by voting against a UN resolution condemning the Russian invasion of Ukraine and calling for the return of Ukraine's pre-war borders. The resolution, represents a major break with Europe.; The US State Department orders officials worldwide to deny visas to transgender athletes coming to the US for sports competitions.	A Joint Press Conference between President Trump and French president Emmanuel Macron Howard Lutnick is sworn in as the 41st United States Secretary of Commerce.
Tuesday February 25	Vice President Vance swears in Dan Driscoll as Army Secretary.; President Trump announces a plan to implement a new "gold card" visa program that would be similar to a green card "but at a higher level of sophistication" for the price of $5 million.; Breaking nearly a century of precedent, the White House announces that it, not the independent White House Correspondents' Association, will decide which journalists participate in the White House press pool. WHCA president Eugene Daniels says the move "tears at the independence of a free press in the United States."	Vice President Vance swears in Dan Driscoll.
Wednesday February 26	President Trump posts an AI-generated video on Truth Social showing a future Gaza under U.S. occupation called "Trump Gaza".; President Trump holds the first cabinet meeting of his second presidency, with Elon Musk also in attendance.; The Senate confirms Jamieson Greer as the U.S. Trade Representative in a vote of 56–43.; President Trump announces 25% tariffs on European Union coming April 2, delays Canada and Mexico tariffs.; The Trump administration cancels 5,800 projects financed by USAID, including projects that combated polio, HIV, tuberculosis, malaria, and malnutrition.; Officials announce that an unvaccinated six-year-old girl in Lubbock, TX has died of measles. It is the nation's first death from measles since 2015.	President Trump at his first cabinet meeting
Thursday February 27	In a highly publicized White House event, Pam Bondi releases 200 pages of Epstein material that she calls "declassified." All the documents had been previously released.; President Trump holds a bilateral meeting and joint press conference with British prime minister Keir Starmer at the White House. Starmer presented an invitation letter to Trump from King Charles III for an 'unprecedented' second state visit.; President Trump announces 25% tariffs on Mexico and Canada will proceed on March 4, alongside a new, additional 10% tariff on China.	A Joint Press Conference between President Trump and British prime minister Keir Starmer
Friday February 28	Vice President Vance delivers remarks at the National Catholic Prayer Breakfast.; President Trump holds a bilateral meeting with Ukrainian president Volodymyr Zelenskyy at the White House. During the meeting, both Trump and Vice President Vance have a heated exchange with Zelenskyy, and Trump cancels a planned joint news conference and signing ceremony for an agreement on mineral rights. U.S. officials tell the Ukrainians to leave.	Vice President Vance delivers remarks at the National Catholic Prayer Breakfast. President Trump and Ukrainian president Volodymyr Zelenskyy hold a bilateral meeting in the Oval Office.(disagreements begin after 39:10)

=== March 2025 ===
Date	Events	Photos/videos
Saturday March 1	President Trump signs an executive order purporting to make English the official language of the United States. This executive order reverses a mandate by former president Bill Clinton which required language assistance for non-English speakers. Federal agencies can decide if they will provide documents and services in other languages.; Trump signs an executive order asking federal agencies to find ways to circumvent endangered species protections and other regulations in order to ramp up timber production in national forests and public lands.	
Sunday March 2	President Trump announces a U.S. Crypto Strategic Reserve which will include Ripple (XRP), Solana (SOL), and Cardano (ADA). He clarified about 2 hours later that it will also include Bitcoin (BTC) and Ethereum (ETH).	
Monday March 3	President Trump announces TSMC will be investing at least $100 billion in U.S.-based semiconductor manufacturing.; The Senate confirms Linda McMahon as the 13th United States Secretary of Education in a vote of 51–45.	President Donald Trump makes an investment announcement.
Tuesday March 4	President Trump delivers his fifth address before a joint session of the members of Congress. Trump speaks for an hour and 40 minutes, making it the longest joint session speech in US history. The speech is notable for several false or misleading statements, and a disruption in which Representative Al Green was removed from the chamber.; President Trump signs an executive order to rename the Anahuac National Wildlife Refuge in Texas to the Jocelyn Nungaray National Wildlife Refuge in memory of Jocelyn Nungaray, a 12-year-old girl from nearby Houston who was raped and murdered by two illegal immigrants on June 16, 2024.	President Trump delivers an address during a joint session of Congress.
Wednesday March 5	President Trump announces a 30-day tariff break for the automobile manufacturing sector.; After meeting with eight individuals who had been held hostage by Hamas, President Trump issues his "last warning" to Hamas to release all remaining hostages held in Gaza.	Press Secretary Karoline Leavitt briefs members of the media.
Thursday March 6	President Trump pauses tariffs on Canada and Mexico until April 2.; President Trump issues a memorandum stating that "it is the policy of the United States to demand that parties seeking injunctions against the Federal Government must cover the costs and damages incurred if the Government is ultimately found to have been wrongfully enjoined or restrained".; Congressman Al Green is censured by the House of Representatives for speaking out of turn during President Trump's address to a joint session of Congress.	
Friday March 7	President Trump signs an executive order to revoke Public Service Loan Forgiveness benefits to "organizations that engage in activities that have a substantial illegal purpose" and "[agencies using] taxpayer funds [to] [subsidize] through loan forgiveness activities that advance illegal immigration, terrorism, child abuse, discrimination, and public disruptions".; A database obtained by the Associated Press reveals that the Trump administration's purge of references to DEI has flagged Pentagon documents for removal of mentions of the World War II airplane which dropped the first atomic bomb, the Enola Gay. Also flagged for deletion were references to individuals with the last name "Gay".	
Saturday March 8	Pro-Palestinian student activist Mahmoud Khalil, a permanent resident of the United States, is taken from his New York City apartment by ICE agents and detained in Louisiana. Khalil's detention is the first publicly known deportation effort related to pro-Palestinian activism under President Trump.	
Sunday March 9	President Trump states that the U.S. has "just about" ended its intelligence pause with Ukraine after starting it on March 5. Trump expresses optimism about upcoming peace talks in Saudi Arabia.; Citing the Trump administration's "assault on democratic norms and global cooperation", the international civil rights watchdog Civicus adds the United States to a watchlist of nations rapidly declining in civic freedoms.	
Monday March 10	The Senate confirms Lori Chavez-DeRemer as the 30th United States Secretary of Labor in a vote of 67–32.; District judge Jesse M. Furman rules that Mahmoud Khalil cannot be deported from the U.S. while the district court assesses the case.	
Tuesday March 11	The House passes a spending bill to avoid a government shutdown, sending it to the Senate.; Responding to nationwide protests at Tesla showrooms over Elon Musk's role in the Trump administration, Trump and Musk promote several Tesla automobiles on the South Grounds of the White House in what The New York Times describes as "part news conference, part car commercial."	Trump and Elon Musk promote Teslas on the South lawn.
Wednesday March 12	Speaking to reporters during a White House meeting with Taoiseach Micheál Martin of Ireland, Trump attacks Senator Chuck Schumer saying "Schumer is a Palestinian as far as I’m concerned. He’s become a Palestinian. He used to be Jewish. He’s not Jewish anymore. He’s a Palestinian." The statement draws rebuked by Jewish and Muslim groups.; The Environmental Protection Agency announces it is cancelling $20 billion in grants for climate programs and is repealing dozens of crucial environmental regulations, including limits on smokestacks, protections for wetlands, and the regulation of greenhouse gases.	President Trump and Taoiseach Micheál Martin
Thursday March 13	President Trump holds a bilateral meeting with NATO Secretary General Mark Rutte at the White House.; Abdallah Makki Muslih al-Rifai, the Chief of Global Operations and the Delegated Committee Emir of the Islamic State, is killed by United States Central Command forces pursuant to President Trump's orders.	President Trump and NATO Secretary General Mark Rutte Footage of Abdallah Makki Muslih al-Rifai's killing
Friday March 14	The Senate passes a spending bill to avert a government shutdown.; Secretary of State Rubio declares South African ambassador to the U.S. Ebrahim Rasool a persona non grata responding to comments Rasool made accusing Trump and Elon Musk of promoting white supremacy.; Rubio also announces visa bans on Thai officials on human rights grounds following the deportation of Uyghurs from Thailand to China.; President Trump delivers a speech at the Department of Justice headquarters, where he called those who oppose him in court, "horrible people" and "scum." According to CNN, he "spent a considerable amount of time during his address heaping praise" on Judge Aileen Cannon.; The Trump administration released a draft list of 43 countries as part of a new travel ban.; Trump signs an executive order dismantling the Voice of America, accusing the federal funded news service of being "anti-Trump" and "radical." VOA's 1400 journalists and staff are immediately put on paid leave.; Audience members loudly boo the entrance of Vice President Vance and second lady Usha Vance as they attend a performance at the Kennedy Center.	President Trump delivers a speech at the Justice Department.
Saturday March 15	President Trump invokes the Alien Enemies Act of 1798 against members of the Venezuelan gang Tren de Aragua within the U.S.; U.S. District Judge James Boasberg blocks Trump from invoking the Alien Enemies Act to deport people without due process.; President Trump orders a series of airstrikes against Houthi-controlled Yemen in response to the Red Sea crisis, killing at least 31 people.	
Sunday March 16	The Trump administration deports 261 alleged members of the Tren de Aragua and MS-13 gangs to El Salvador despite a court order from Boasberg blocking such removals. The White House contends that the deportees had already left U.S. soil by the time the court order was signed.	
Monday March 17	Responding to yesterday's court order blocking the removal of suspected gang members, El Salvador president Nayib Bukele posts "Oopsie...too late" and a crying-with-laughter emoji on X. Marco Rubio and White House communications director Steven Cheung repost Bukele's message, with Cheung adding a clip of actor Denzel Washington saying "Boom!"; President Trump states on Truth Social that Iran will "suffer the consequences" if Houthis commit further attacks.; A dispute over the limits of government authority between DOGE and the independent, non-profit US Institute of Peace turns into a standoff involving the police and F.B.I., after DOGE staffers enter the agency's headquarters to evict officials, who refuse to recognize their termination and prepare for legal action.	
Tuesday March 18	President Trump speaks with Russian president Vladimir Putin over the phone in an attempt to negotiate a ceasefire for the Russian invasion of Ukraine.; After Trump calls for Judge Boasberg to be impeached, Supreme Court Chief Justice John Roberts rebukes Trump, saying that calls for impeachment are not an appropriate response to disagreements with court rulings.; All of the records related to the assassination of John F. Kennedy that were previously withheld for classification are released pursuant to an executive order from President Trump. Later, it is discovered that the release exposed Social Security numbers and other private information of over 400 former congressional staffers and others, including longtime Trump attorney and conspiracy theorist Joseph diGenova, who called the release "absolutely outrageous. It’s sloppy, unprofessional".; President Trump fires FTC commissioners Alvaro Bedoya and Rebecca Slaughter.; An article about Jackie Robinson's military career is removed from the Department of Defense's website because of the administration's purge of material it considers to be related to DEI. Other articles removed include material on Native American Ira Hayes, one of the marines famously photographed raising the American flag at Iwo Jima, the Tuskegee Airmen, and multiple articles about Native American code talkers.	
Wednesday March 19	President Trump holds a follow-up negotiation call with Ukrainian president Volodymyr Zelenskyy following his call with Russian president Vladimir Putin the previous day.	Press Secretary Karoline Leavitt briefs members of the media.
Thursday March 20	President Trump signs an executive order directing Education Secretary Linda McMahon to begin dismantling the United States Department of Education.; After outcry, the previously removed articles about Jackie Robinson's military career, the Tuskegee Airmen and others are restored to the Department of Defense's website.	
Friday March 21	Reports emerge that many men recently accused of being members of Tren de Aragua and deported to El Salvador have no history with the gang, or even any criminal record. Advocates and families of the accused say they are being targeted solely because of tattoos memorializing soccer teams, family members and their professions, and not the Venezuelan criminal gang.; President Trump revokes the security clearances of fourteen people, including Hillary Clinton, Kamala Harris, Alvin Bragg, Letitia James, Antony Blinken and Liz Cheney.; Responding to an executive order specifically targeting the firm, the prominent law firm known as Paul Weiss signs a settlement with the Trump administration, agreeing that firm would commit $40 million worth of pro bono legal services in support of Trump administration goals and that they would cancel their diversity, equity, and inclusion policies. Later, it is discovered that the DEI portion of the agreement was not in fact in the written deal and only something falsely claimed on social media, which chairman Brad Karp chose to not publicly dispute.	A woman protesting the deportation of people to El Salvador because of tattoos.
Saturday March 22	In a post on Truth Social, President Trump calls on Maine Governor Janet Mills to apologize for her dispute with him regarding transgender athletes. The following Monday, Mills declines to do so, saying "My issue is about the rule of law, pure and simple."	
Sunday March 23	President Trump disparages a portrait of him hanging in the Colorado State Capitol in a post on Truth Social, calling it "distorted".; The Trump administration publishes a notice to end the legal status of over 500,000 migrants from Cuba, Haiti, Nicaragua, and Venezuela who entered the U.S. under the CHNV humanitarian parole program.	
Monday March 24	A group chat on Signal between several members of President Trump's cabinet is accidentally leaked when journalist Jeffrey Goldberg is mistakenly added to the group. The group, which included Pete Hegseth, JD Vance, Marco Rubio and Tulsi Gabbard discussed classified operational details about airstrikes in Yemen.; Responding to the news of the Signal security breach in which war plans were accidentally leaked to a journalist, Hillary Clinton posts "You have got to be kidding me."; United States Postmaster General Louis DeJoy resigns from his position.	Screenshots from the leaked chat showing Pete Hegseth discussing classified plans for the attacks in Yemen
Tuesday March 25	President Trump signs an executive order attempting to overhaul the electoral process, including clauses such as having all ballots be received by Election Day and requiring voters to provide proof of U.S. citizenship.; John Phelan is sworn in as the 79th U.S. Secretary of the Navy.; DNI Director Tulsi Gabbard, CIA Director John Ratcliffe, FBI Director Kash Patel, and other National Security officials testify in Congress regarding the Signal group chat leaks.; The portrait of Donald Trump at the Colorado State Capital is removed after President Trump complained about his likeness on social media.	National Security officials testifying in Congress regarding the Signal group chat leaks.
Wednesday March 26	President Trump imposes a 25% tariff on all foreign car imports, set to go into effect one week after the imposition.	
Thursday March 27	President Trump withdraws his nomination of Elise Stefanik as ambassador to the United Nations, citing concerns over Republicans' thin House majority.; Secretary Rubio announces the revocation of at least 300 student visas. Many of said visas were held by students who demonstrated support for Palestine during the Israel-Hamas conflict.; Robert F. Kennedy Jr. announces that the Trump administration will lay off 10,000 employees at the Department of Health and Human Services. Democrats and experts say the move will endanger public health and food safety,	
Friday March 28	Peter Marks, the FDA's top vaccine official, resigns under pressure from Health Secretary Robert F. Kennedy Jr., writing in his resignation letter that Kennedy "doesn’t care about the truth" and that Kennedy's positions on vaccines pose a danger to the public.; During a visit to a military base in Greenland, Vice President Vance tells Greenlanders they that they would be better off being part of the United States rather than Denmark.	Vice President Vance Delivers Remarks to U.S. Service members in Greenland
Saturday March 29	Finnish president Alexander Stubb has a surprise, informal meeting with President Trump while playing golf in Florida. After the meeting, Trump posted on Truth Social lauding the relationship between Finland and the U.S. including "the purchase and development of a large number of badly needed [i]cebreakers".; The White House Correspondents' Association cancels its plans to have Amber Ruffin host the annual White House Correspondents Association Dinner.; Thousands of protesters in over 200 cities world-wide participate in Tesla Takedown rallies outside Tesla facilities.	About 500 protesters gather outside Tesla in Minneapolis.
Sunday March 30	Defense Secretary Hegseth announces plans to build up U.S. military forces in Japan to set up "war-fighting" headquarters.; President Trump indicates that he is considering an attempt to bypass the 22nd amendment and seek a third presidential term.	
Monday March 31	President Trump signs executive orders with musician Kid Rock in attendance.; Nine Planned Parenthood affiliates received notices from the U.S. Department of Health and Human Services indicating that their federal funds were being "'temporarily withheld'" based on potential violations of executive orders and federal law.; In a court filing, the Trump administration admits that Kilmar Abrego Garcia was mistakenly deported due to an "administrative error" and sent to a "Terrorism Confinement Center" in El Salvador. However, because Garcia is now in El Salavdorian custody, the government argues the courts have no jurisdiction to order his return.	President Trump signs executive orders with musician Kid Rock.

== See also ==
- First 100 days of the second Trump presidency – Period from January to April 2025
- List of executive actions by Donald Trump
- Lists of presidential trips made by Donald Trump (international trips)
- Second presidential transition of Donald Trump – Transfer of presidential power from Joe Biden to Donald Trump
- Timeline of the 2024 United States presidential election

U.S. presidential administration timelines
Preceded by Biden presidency (2024 Q4–January 2025)	Second Trump presidency (2025 Q1)	Succeeded by Second Trump presidency (2025 Q2)
