= 2025 U.S. Department of Justice resignations =

Hagan Scotten's resignation letter

In February 2025, seven U.S. Department of Justice prosecutors resigned in response to orders from acting Deputy Attorney General Emil Bove to dismiss federal criminal corruption charges against New York City Mayor Eric Adams. The resignations included two attorneys of the Southern District of New York, acting U.S. Attorney Danielle Sassoon and Assistant U.S. Attorney Hagan Scotten, as well as five attorneys in the U.S. Department of Justice Criminal Division's Public Integrity Section in Washington, D.C. including the acting head of the Justice Department's Criminal Division, Kevin Driscoll, and the acting chief of Public Integrity, John Keller.

Sassoon resigned because she alleged in a letter that the dismissal of charges was intended to be a quid pro quo, indicating that Adams would assist with Trump's enforcement priorities if the indictment were dismissed.

Commentators nicknamed the resignations the "Thursday Night Massacre", comparing them to the 1973 Saturday Night Massacre resignations when president Richard Nixon ordered officials from the Department of Justice to fire the special prosecutor heading the Watergate investigation. Due to the event's proximity to Valentine's Day, former U.S. Attorney Barbara McQuade dubbed those terminated as the "Valentine's Day Seven".

Adams' case was dismissed with prejudice by judge Dale Ho in April 2025 due to inability to force a Justice Department prosecution. Ho reported no other examples of dismissing charges against elected officials to allow the official to "facilitate federal policy goals", indicating that this may amount to "special dispensation" which violates "the basic promise of equal justice under law".

== Background ==
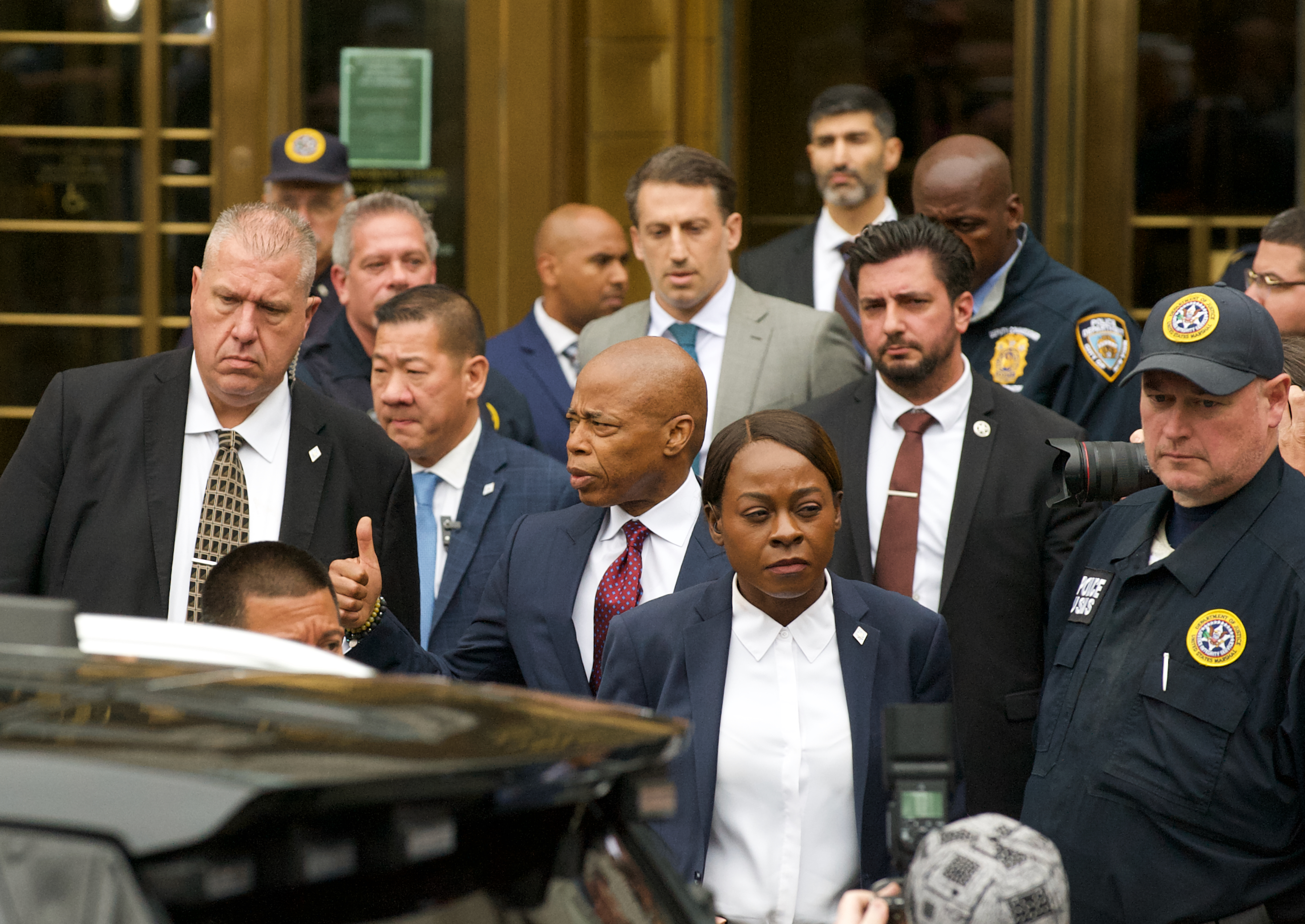
Eric Adams after he was arraigned and pleaded not guilty

The New York Times reported on November 12, 2023, that the Mayor of New York Eric Adams was being investigated by the Federal Bureau of Investigation regarding alleged unlawful influence on Adams by the Turkish government.

Adams was indicted on federal charges of bribery, fraud, and soliciting foreign campaign donations on September 25, 2024. On September 26, the case was unsealed, revealing the five charges: bribery, conspiracy, fraud, and two counts of soliciting illegal foreign campaign donations. The alleged acts for which Adams was indicted begin in 2014, when he was still Brooklyn Borough President. Adams is accused of receiving luxury travel and other benefits from people from Turkey, namely a Turkish government official and a Turkish businessman. This included Adams pressuring the New York City Fire Department to open a Turkish consular building without a fire inspection. Allegedly, in order to cover up his misconduct, Adams created and instructed others to make false paper trails indicating that he actually paid for these trips in full. He was arraigned in federal court on September 27, entering a plea of not guilty.

In response, Adams said that the charges are "entirely false, based on lies", called for an immediate trial, and vowed to fight the charges. Adams claimed that the charges are retaliation for his opposing the Biden administration's handling of the migrant crisis. On September 30, Adams sought dismissal of the bribery charge against him for being "extraordinarily vague" and filed by "zealous prosecutors".

== Resignations ==
=== Southern District of New York resignations ===
==== Danielle Sassoon resignation ====
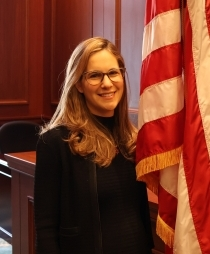
Danielle Sassoon

In January 2025, President Donald Trump appointed Danielle Sassoon as Acting U.S. Attorney for the Southern District of New York, pending the Senate confirmation of Jay Clayton.

On February 10, 2025, acting U.S. Deputy Attorney General Emil Bove, who had previously been Donald Trump's criminal defense attorney, issued a memorandum directing Sassoon to dismiss the charges against Adams, as "authorized by the Attorney General". Bove stated that dismissal (without prejudice) was warranted "without assessing the strength of the evidence or the legal theories on which the case is based", and that Adams' case would be relooked at after Adams' mayoral election. The reasons given by Bove in the memorandum were that the "prosecution has unduly restricted Mayor Adams' ability to devote full attention and resources to illegal immigration and violent crime" and "improperly interfered with Mayor Adams' campaign in the [November] 2025 mayoral election", taking into account that charges were brought after "Adams criticized the prior Administration's immigration policies". Bove also explicitly rejected the idea that this settlement was a quid pro quo in a footnote in the memo stating that "as Mr. Bove clearly stated to defense counsel during our meeting [on January 31, 2025], the Government is not offering to exchange dismissal of a criminal case for Adams's assistance on immigration enforcement."

On February 12, 2025, Sassoon, who is a registered Republican and a "member of a deeply conservative Federalist Society", sent a letter to Attorney General Pam Bondi objecting to dropping the charges for explicitly political reasons, and requesting a meeting. Sassoon stated that "Mr. Bove rightly has never called into question that the case team conducted this investigation with integrity and that the charges against Adams are serious and supported by fact and law" but that Mr. Bove wants the case dismissed for "reasons having nothing to do with the strength of the case" and this "raises serious concerns that render the contemplated dismissal inconsistent with my ability and duty to prosecute federal crimes without fear or favor and to advance good-faith arguments before the courts". In that letter Sassoon stated "The reasons advanced by Mr. Bove for dismissing the indictment are not ones I can in good faith defend as in the public interest and as consistent with the principles of impartiality and fairness that guide my decision-making." Sassoon argues that "Mr. Bove proposes dismissing the charges against Adams in return for his assistance in enforcing the federal immigration laws, analogizing to the prisoner exchange in which the United States freed notorious Russian arms dealer Viktor Bout in return for an American prisoner in Russia" and that "[s]uch an exchange with Adams violates commonsense beliefs in the equal administration of justice, the Justice Manual, and the Rules of Professional Conduct." Sassoon continues that Adams's advocacy for helping out with immigration issues if the case is dismissed "should be called out for what it is: an improper offer of immigration enforcement assistance in exchange for a dismissal of his case". Sassoon also stated in her letter that she attended the January 31 meeting with Bove and Adams' lawyers. In that meeting, Sassoon described in her letter that Adams's lawyers "repeatedly urged what amounted to a quid pro quo, indicating that Adams would be in a position to assist with the Department's enforcement priorities only if the indictment were dismissed." According to Sassoon's letter, Bove "'admonished' a member of her team for taking notes during the meeting, and later had the notes collected." Sassoon concluded her letter with her position that "In the event you are unwilling to meet or to reconsider the directive in light of the problems raised by Mr. Bove's memo, I am prepared to offer my resignation."

Rather than arranging a meeting with the Attorney General to address Sassoon's concerns, Bove preemptively accepted her resignation the following day, and stated that her conduct would be investigated by the Office of the Attorney General, pursuant to Executive Order 14147. Bove accused Sassoon of "insubordination and apparent misconduct", stating that he had removed the case from New York prosecutors' purview, was placing two prosecutors of Adams on leave, and was starting an investigation on Sassoon and these two prosecutors. Bove also highlighted that after Damian Williams (who prosecuted Adams) resigned from being a federal prosecutor, Williams started a personal website and wrote a political op-ed, which Bove said "politicized" Adams' prosecution. Bove also accused Sassoon of violating her duty: "In no valid sense do you uphold the Constitution by disobeying direct orders implementing the policy of a duly elected President."

==== Hagan Scotten resignation ====
On February 13, 2025, Hagan Scotten, an "Iraq War veteran and Bronze Star recipient who clerked for Chief Justice John Roberts at the Supreme Court and at an appeals court for Justice Brett Kavanaugh" and a "registered Republican", resigned. Scotten disputed the two arguments that Bove gave for the dismissal stating that "the first justification...that Damian Williams's role in the case somehow tainted a valid indictment...is so weak as to be transparently pretextual" and that the "second justification is worse" in that "[n]o system of ordered liberty can allow the Government to use the carrot of dismissing charges, or the stick of threatening to bring them again, to induce an elected official to support its policy objectives. In explaining his resignation in a letter, Scotten wrote "any assistant U.S. attorney would know that our laws and traditions do not allow using the prosecutorial power to influence other citizens, much less elected officials, in this way." He added: "If no lawyer within earshot of the President is willing to give him that advice, then I expect you will eventually find someone who is enough of a fool, or enough of a coward, to file your motion. But it was never going to be me."

=== Department of Justice Public Integrity Section resignations ===
After attempting to get the attorneys from the Southern District of New York to dismiss the case against Adams, and their resigning in protest, Bove turned next to the attorneys in U.S. Department of Justice Criminal Division's Public Integrity Section. On February 13, 2025, five officials would resign from the Department of Justice (DOJ) Criminal Division rather than carry out the administration's order to dismiss the case.

The first to resign was Kevin Driscoll, the acting head of the Criminal Division, followed by John Keller, the acting head of the Criminal Division's Public Integrity Section. After both Driscoll and Keller resigned, Bove requested to speak to "three more prosecutors from the office", to find one who would file the dismissal. The prosecutors "initially tried to talk Bove out of forcing them to sign the filing", but when Bove insisted that one of them file the dismissal, the three "resigned on the spot".

The next day on February 14, Bove reportedly issued an ultimatum to the "nearly 20 lawyers" in the Public Integrity Section on a video call, which Josh Gerstein of Politico described as "Choose someone in the section to carry out the order to seek dismissal of the Adams case, or be fired." According to former U.S. Attorney Barbara McQuade posting on X: "DOJ leadership [put] all Public Integrity Section lawyers into a room with 1 hour to decide who will dismiss Adams indictment or else all will be fired... Sending them strength to stand by their oath, which is to support the Constitution, not the president's political agenda." The New York Times reported that Bove wanted two lawyers to sign the dismissal. It was also reported that Bove said those that did support the dismissal "could be promoted".

The attorneys considered mass resignation, with some already having written resignation letters. After 30 minutes of discussion, Ed Sullivan volunteered to sign the document because he believed this would "protect the other lawyers" and "in some ways, he did not have as much to lose" having already had a more "tarnished" reputation after being previously investigated relating to "the prosecution of Senator Ted Stevens, Republican of Alaska." According to The New York Times, "many in the group [of lawyers] considered Mr. Sullivan's decision to step forward an honorable act." In addition to Sullivan, Antoinette Bacon also agreed to sign the document. Along with Sullivan and Bacon adding their names to the dismissal, "in a highly unusual move, Bove also signed the motion personally".

On February 17, Ryan Crosswell, a trial attorney in the Public Integrity Section, resigned. In his letter, which was published in the Washington Post, Crosswell said he left because it was improper for Bove to pressure attorneys in the public integrity unit to sign a motion that Bove had acknowledged “was not based on the facts or the law.” He wrote:

I have been a federal prosecutor for ten years. I love this job. I love representing my country in federal court. And I love my former colleagues, whose integrity and courage reflects the Department's best traditions and gives me hope for our section's future. I cannot work for someone who invokes leadership after forcing dedicated public servants to choose between termination and a dismissal so plainly at odds with core prosecutorial principles.

Later in April 2025, three additional federal prosecutors, Celia V. Cohen, Andrew Rohrbach, and Derek Wikstrom, would resign as well after refusing to admit any wrongdoing related to the case.

== Aftermath ==
When asked by a reporter whether he ordered the dismissal of charges against Adams, President Trump responded that he did not command the Justice Department to drop the charges, and said: "I didn't... I know nothing about it." "I don't know if he or she resigned, but that U.S. attorney was fired".

President Trump also said that all of the people who resigned were going to be eliminated anyway: "Obviously, I'm not involved in that, but I would say this. If they had a problem — and these are mostly people from the previous administration, you understand. So they weren't going to be there anyway. They were all going to be gone or dismissed ... because what you do is you come in and you put new people in.... So when you say resigned, they were gonna be gone anyway... But I know nothing about the individual case. I know that they didn't feel it was much of the case. They also felt that it was unfair with the election." Although "Trump claimed Sassoon and others were from the previous administration, Sassoon had...been appointed to her position by Trump's team."

On February 14, Adams appeared on Fox & Friends with Trump's border czar Tom Homan who discussed what he would do if Adams failed to live up to his "agreement": "If [Adams] doesn't come through, I'll be back in New York City and we won't be sitting on the couch. I'll be in his office, up his butt saying, 'Where the hell is the agreement we came to?'" Homan later rejected accusations that this discussion illustrated a quid pro quo regarding the dismissal of charges against Adams: "I really don't think it had anything to do with whatever's going on in the Justice Department... We never talked about that. It's kind of out of my lane. I have been talking to the mayor for months about getting in Rikers Island... It was cop to cop, not border czar to mayor, cop to cop... And we talked about the public safety threats and how they should be removed from our communities. And that was the end of the conversation."

Adams later denied there was any quid pro quo for dropping the charges: "I want to be crystal clear with New Yorkers: I never offered — nor did anyone offer on my behalf — any trade of my authority as your mayor for an end to my case."

Bove stated that, going forward, officials in the Washington, D.C. office of the Justice Department would take over the Adams case, and that Matthew Podolsky would be taking over Sassoon's role as Acting U.S. Attorney for the Southern District of New York.

On February 17, it was reported that four (Maria Torres-Springer, Anne Williams-Isom, Meera Joshi, Chauncey Parker) of the eight deputy mayors of New York City under Adams would be resigning. In response to the deputy mayor resignations, comptroller Brad Lander released a public letter to Mayor Adams threatening to convene a meeting of the Inability Committee if Mayor Adams does not "develop and present a detailed contingency plan outlining how you intend to manage the City of New York."

In response to the filed dismissal, several attorneys requested that the judge in the case investigate the dismissal. On February 17, three former U.S. Attorneys requested that the judge "conduct a factual inquiry" into the dismissal and cited "[the] extraordinary events" that had recently occurred as reason for the inquiry. Another letter filed on February 17 by former Manhattan federal prosecutor Nathaniel Akerman argued that the judge either deny the dismissal motion because it was intended as a "'corrupt quid pro quo' between Adams and the DOJ" or alternatively "consider appointing an independent special prosecutor to continue the prosecution of Mr. Adams in this Court."

On February 22, a number of complaints were filed against Bove. The Campaign for Accountability, "filed complaints with state and federal attorney grievance committees in New York, asking for investigations into Mr. Bove's actions" and Brad Hoylman-Sigal, a Democratic state senator from New York, filed a complaint with a New York state court grievance committee stating that Mr. Bove's "'abuse of legal process for political ends' was prohibited by the rules of professional conduct."

=== Further Court proceedings ===
After the resignations and the filing of the dismissal of charges by the DOJ against Adams, U.S. District Judge Dale Ho ordered Adams, his attorneys, and DOJ attorneys to appear on February 19 to explain the filed dismissal request: "The parties shall be prepared to address, [among other things], the reasons for the Government's motion, the scope and effect of Mayor Adams's 'consent in writing.'"

Adams's attorney filed a letter with the judge on February 18 arguing that there "was no quid pro quo". Adams's attorney also argued that Adams "never offered anything to the Department, or anyone else, for the dismissal" and that the government "nor anyone else, ever asked anything of us for the dismissal".

After the hearing, Judge Ho decided to order the trial of corruption charges against Adams "adjourned without setting a new date". However, he also stated in his order that he was appointing an outside lawyer to present independent arguments on the motion to dismiss because "there has been no adversarial testing of the government's position." Judge Ho appointed Paul D. Clement, a respected conservative jurist, as amicus curiae to answer various questions regarding the appropriateness of dismissing the charges under the current circumstances. Judge Ho also "called for additional briefs from the parties and said he would hold an oral argument on March 14 if he felt it was necessary."

On March 11, Judge Ho cancelled the plans for March 14 oral argument, viewing it as unnecessary; Clement's advice to the court was to accept the dismissal motion, the only remaining dispute between the parties being whether the dismissal should be with prejudice (requested by the defense and supported by Clement) or without prejudice (requested by the prosecution).

=== Dismissal with prejudice ===
Adams' indictment was dismissed with prejudice in April 2025 by judge Dale Ho, who wrote that the court "cannot force the Department of Justice to prosecute a defendant." Ho highlighted that the dismissal "does not express any opinion as to the merits of the case or whether the prosecution of Mayor Adams 'should' move forward". Ho declined to dismiss without prejudice as requested by the Justice Department, as Ho wrote that doing so risked Adams becoming seemingly "more beholden to the demands of the federal government than to the wishes of his own constituents", as it would appear that Adams' "freedom depends on his ability to carry out the immigration enforcement priorities" of the Trump administration.

Ho found that the Justice Department's argument, that Adams' case had "appearances of impropriety", was "unsupported by any objective evidence" as prosecutors "followed all appropriate Justice Department guidelines" and there was "no evidence — zero — that they had any improper motives." Ho also rejected Justice Department's argument that the case against Adams was election interference, as Adams' case was "entirely consistent with prior public corruption prosecutions", as Ho indicated that the "'appearances of impropriety' rationale is not just thin, but pretextual".

Instead, Ho commented that the Justice Department's dismissal request "smacks of a bargain: dismissal of the Indictment in exchange for immigration policy concessions.” Ho disagreed with the Justice Department's claim that the indictment "impaired Mayor Adams in his immigration enforcement efforts", finding that after the Trump administration requested dismissal, Adams "took at least one new immigration-related action consistent with the preferences" of the Trump administration.

Ho noted "no examples" provided by the Justice Department (and Ho could not find any examples) of "the government dismissing charges against an elected official because doing so would enable the official to facilitate federal policy goals", pointing out that the Justice Department's choice to seek dismissal on these grounds indicated that "public officials may receive special dispensation if they are compliant with the incumbent administration’s policy priorities", violating "the basic promise of equal justice under law".

=== April resignations ===
In April 2025, three additional federal prosecutors, Celia V. Cohen, Andrew Rohrbach, and Derek Wikstrom, resigned after refusing to admit any wrongdoing in their conduct for prosecuting Adams. They claimed they were being pressured to falsely admit to misconduct in the case as a condition for reinstatement so they decided to resign rather than falsely admit to wrongdoing. They stated that Todd Blanche had required for reinstatement that they “must express regret and admit some wrongdoing by the office in connection with the refusal to move to dismiss the case” but that they “will not confess wrongdoing when there was none.”

== Reactions ==
There were intense reactions to the required dismissal of charges and the resignations. A former senior Justice Department official called the dropping of the case against Adams in this manner "jaw dropping, shocking" and that this was "the worst [fallout] we've seen so far (from the new DOJ) and that's a high bar." One former senior Justice Department official stated "I think it's safe to say this is the most dire crisis that current attorneys of the Department of Justice have ever faced in a modern era of the Justice Department... The crudeness of the intimidation is just absolutely chilling".

A former DOJ official stated that normally this sort of action would be met with widespread political opposition: "In any other world, the Senate Judiciary Committee and House Judiciary Committee would be immediately plunging into action... You'd have the IG [inspector general] launching an investigation, you'd have OPR [the Office of Professional Responsibility] launching an investigation. And they're all silent." One of the reasons for the mass resignations is that attorneys will have to defend these actions in court before a federal judge. Peter Zeidenberg, previously an attorney in the Public Integrity Section, said regarding appearing in court to defend these actions: "It's going to be a bloodbath. That's why no one wants to sign it... The judge is going to call that person in and is going to want to know why this is in the public interest."

Reuters stated that this case "illustrated the tensions between the traditional U.S. conservative Republican legal movement and Trump's desire to exert far more direct control of the federal government, challenging standards of prosecutorial independence that have stood for a half century." Ilya Somin, a Libertarian scholar and Federalist Society member, said that the dispute over the dismissal of charges against Adams was a microcosm of the dispute happening in conservative circles: "There are disagreements between those who care about rule of law values, and those who are willing to subordinate themselves to other considerations... This sets a dangerous precedent."

Pam Bondi spoke in favour of the decision to drop the case, referring to the prosecution as an anti-Adams "weaponization" of the attorney general's office: "We have a right to protect against weaponization in New York and every state in this country."

Edward Whelan, a conservative jurist and former clerk of conservative Supreme Court Justice Antonin Scalia, wrote for The National Review regarding the issue:

I think Sassoon is right that it is not proper to drop charges against a public official in exchange for that public official's agreeing to use his office to advance the policies of the Trump administration, nor is it proper to drop those charges without prejudice (i.e., subject to being reinstated) in order to exert leverage over how that public official carries out his duties. How can Bove claim to be ending the "weaponization" of prosecutions when he is advancing a practice that would treat leniently public officials who promise to support the Trump administration's policies and treat more harshly those who don't? In short, the extension of the logic of plea-bargain conditions into the realm of compliant policy actions by public officials is very much the politicization of criminal justice.

Journalists and legal scholars have compared the series of resignations to the 1973 Saturday Night Massacre, when president Richard Nixon ordered DOJ executives to fire Archibald Cox, the special prosecutor heading the Watergate investigation. Nixon's attorney general, Elliot Richardson, resigned rather than carry out the order, as did William Ruckelshaus, the deputy attorney general. Loyola University Chicago School of Law professor Juliet Sorensen noted that in each case, lawyers resigned "as a matter of professional responsibility and refused to get in line behind a blatantly political objective", and Georgetown Law School professor Steve Vladeck described it as the Saturday Night Massacre "on steroids".

On February 18, over 900 former federal prosecutors published an "open letter to career federal prosecutors", making it clear that the letter was meant for those who'd recently resigned as well as those who continue to work for the DOJ. The letter highlighted traditional DOJ values, such as basing investigations and charging decisions on the law rather than politics, and noted the signatories' concern that "these values have been tested by recent actions of the Department's leadership." The letter also lauded the prosecutors for having "responded to ethical challenges of a type no public servant should ever be forced to confront with principle and conviction". Paul Tuchmann, a former federal prosecutor, said Bove's referral of Sassoon and Scotten for an investigation into misconduct was sending a signal to the rest of the Department of Justice: "If you do anything that's not exactly what he wants, you're going to be punished regardless of whether or not what he wants is appropriate or ethical."

== See also ==
- 2025 dismissals of U.S. inspectors general
- 2025 United States federal mass layoffs
