= Trent McCotter =

American lawyer (born 1987)

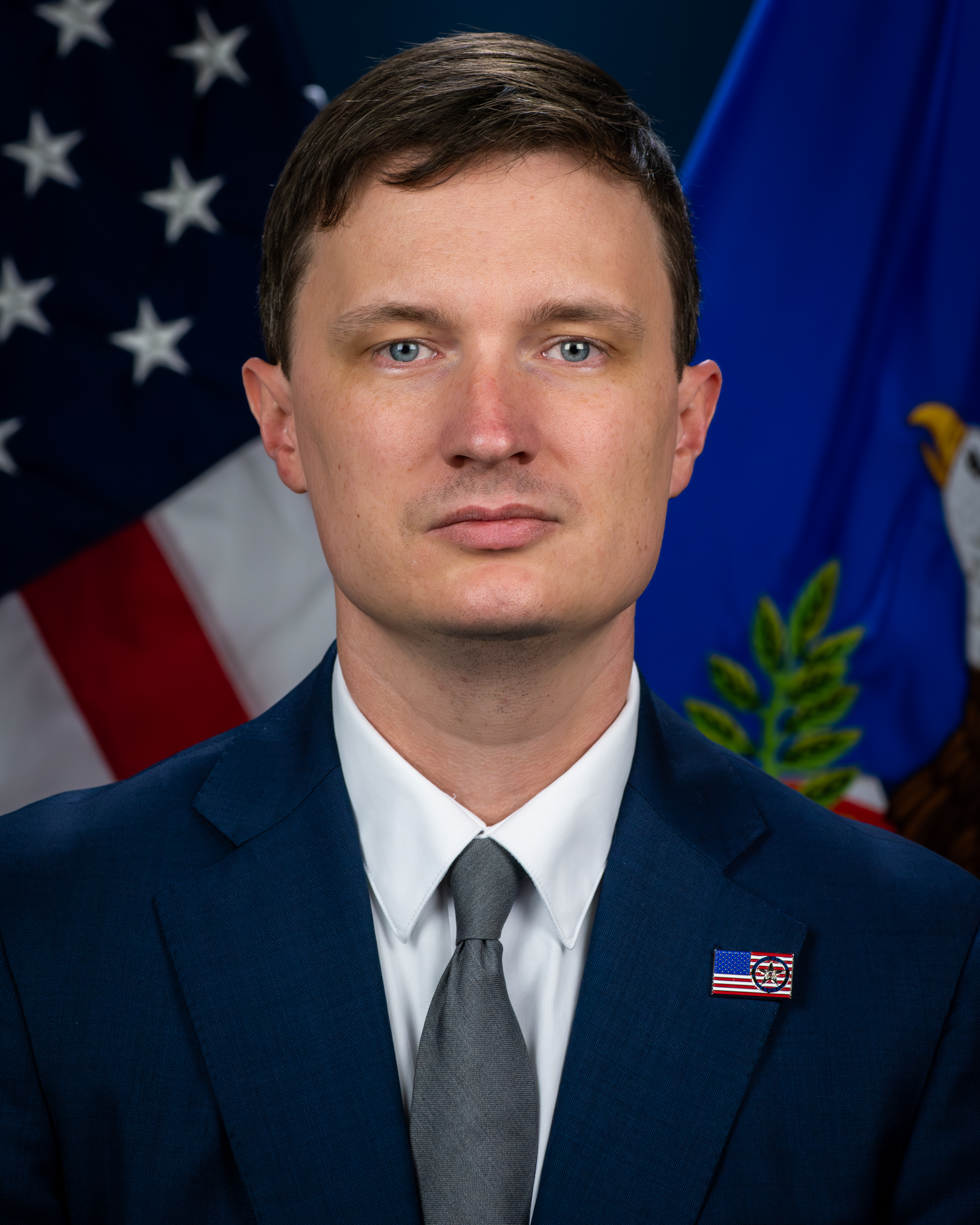
- Official portrait, 2026

Acting United States Deputy Attorney General
- Incumbent
- Assumed office August 10, 2026
- President: Donald Trump
- Attorney General: Todd Blanche
- Preceded by: Todd Blanche

Principal Associate Deputy Attorney General
- Incumbent
- Assumed office April 9, 2026
- President: Donald Trump
- Preceded by: Emil Bove

Personal details
- Born: Richard Trent McCotter; March 1987 (age 39)
- Education: University of North Carolina (BA, JD)

Richard Trent McCotter (born March 1987) is an American lawyer who has served as the acting United States deputy attorney general and as the principal associate deputy attorney general since 2026.

== Early life and education (1987–2011) ==
Richard Trent McCotter was born in March 1987. McCotter attended West Forsyth High School. He corrected Babe Ruth's 1926 run batted in average; by 2007, he had become a member of the Society for American Baseball Research's records committee. McCotter graduated from the University of North Carolina School of Law. He clerked for judges Steven Menashi of the Court of Appeals for the Second Circuit and R. Lanier Anderson III of the Court of Appeals for the Eleventh Circuit.

== Career ==
=== Early work (2012–2022) ===
McCotter worked in Jenner & Block's Supreme Court and appellate practice group. In 2017, he became an assistant U.S. attorney for the Eastern District of Virginia. McCotter was involved in the prosecution of Edward Snowden. In the final months of president Donald Trump's first term, he served as a deputy associate attorney general in the Department of Justice Civil Rights Division.

=== Boyden Gray (2021–2026) ===
In 2021, McCotter joined the lawyer C. Boyden Gray's firm, Boyden Gray & Associates. In March 2022, he represented several federal employees who sued the Biden administration over its requirement for federal employees to be vaccinated against COVID-19. By May 2023, McCotter had become a partner at Boyden Gray. Prior to his death that month, Gray worked with McCotter to restructure the firm. McCotter argued before the Supreme Court in FCC v. Consumers' Research (2025), a case involving the constitutionality of the Universal Service Fund. He filed a petition on behalf of Ed Blum's companies seeking for the Securities and Exchange Commission to restrict proxy advisory firms from considering gender, race, or ethnicity in their guidance to investors.

=== Principal associate deputy attorney general (2026–present) ===
On April 9, 2026, acting Attorney General Todd Blanche appointed McCotter as the principal associate deputy attorney general. According to The Wall Street Journal, Boris Epshteyn helped secure McCotter's position. According to The New York Times, McCotter was a key individual in negotiations in the attempted settlement of Trump v. Internal Revenue Service. McCotter urged the Department to establish the Anti-Weaponization Fund, a program to compensate victims of apparent prosecutorial overreach. He coordinated with Trump's personal lawyers and proposed setting the sum at US$1.776 billion, referencing the year that the Declaration of Independence was signed. In August, Judge Nicholas Garaufis dismissed the indictment against Gautam Adani. Garaufis criticized McCotter, who he believed attempted to dismiss the case, as having seemingly "eschewed the professional opinions of innumerable officials from various federal offices." He additionally noted that the lack of involvement from agents and attorneys involved with the case appeared to be "highly unusual".

On October 12, 2026, McCotter reportedly approved the federal raid on the home of Representative Ilhan Omar (D-Minn) as part of an investigation into "immigration fraud" stemming from documents from Omar's late father during her arrival as a child refugee in 1995.

On October 25, 2026, a criminal information filed by McCotter on 5 October was unsealed, charging former FBI director James Comey with violations of the Espionage Act of 1917. It marked the third such attempt at prosecuting Comey. The first was dismissed by Judge Cameron McGowan Currie in November 2025 on the basis of political persecution. The second was filed in April 2026 and on the basis of an Instagram post containing seashells organized in an "86" (a slang term meaning to eject or get rid of), and is ongoing. Unlike a criminal indictment which requires a grand jury to deliberate and agree on charges to be filed, an information requires only the approval of a court officer, typically a magistrate judge, and is thus easier to achieve.

Legal offices
Preceded by Emil Bove	Principal Associate Deputy Attorney General; 2026–present	Incumbent
Preceded by Todd Blanche	United States Deputy Attorney General; Acting; 2026–present	Incumbent
