= 2025 Donald Trump speech to a joint session of Congress =

Speech by US President Donald Trump

- Full video of the speech as published by the White House
- Date: March 4, 2025
- Time: 9:19 p.m. EST
- Duration: 1 hour, 39 minutes
- Venue: House Chamber, U.S. Capitol
- Location: Washington, D.C.; 38°53′19.8″N 77°00′32.8″W
- Type: Unofficial State of the Union Address
- Participants: Donald Trump; JD Vance; Mike Johnson
- Footage: C-SPAN
- Previous: 2024 State of the Union Address
- Next: 2026 State of the Union Address

Donald Trump, the 47th president of the United States, addressed a joint session of the United States Congress on March 4, 2025. It was his first public address before a joint session during his second term. Overall, it was Trump's fifth speech to a joint session of the United States Congress. Like a State of the Union Address, it was delivered before the 119th United States Congress in the Chamber of the House of Representatives in the United States Capitol. Presiding over this joint session was the House speaker, Mike Johnson, accompanied by JD Vance, the vice president in his capacity as the president of the Senate.

== Background ==
The Article Two of the United States Constitution requires the president to occasionally "give to the Congress information of the state of the union." Beginning with Ronald Reagan in 1981, presidents have delivered an address in the months after they are sworn in. Secretary of Veterans Affairs Doug Collins was named the designated survivor.

== Speech ==
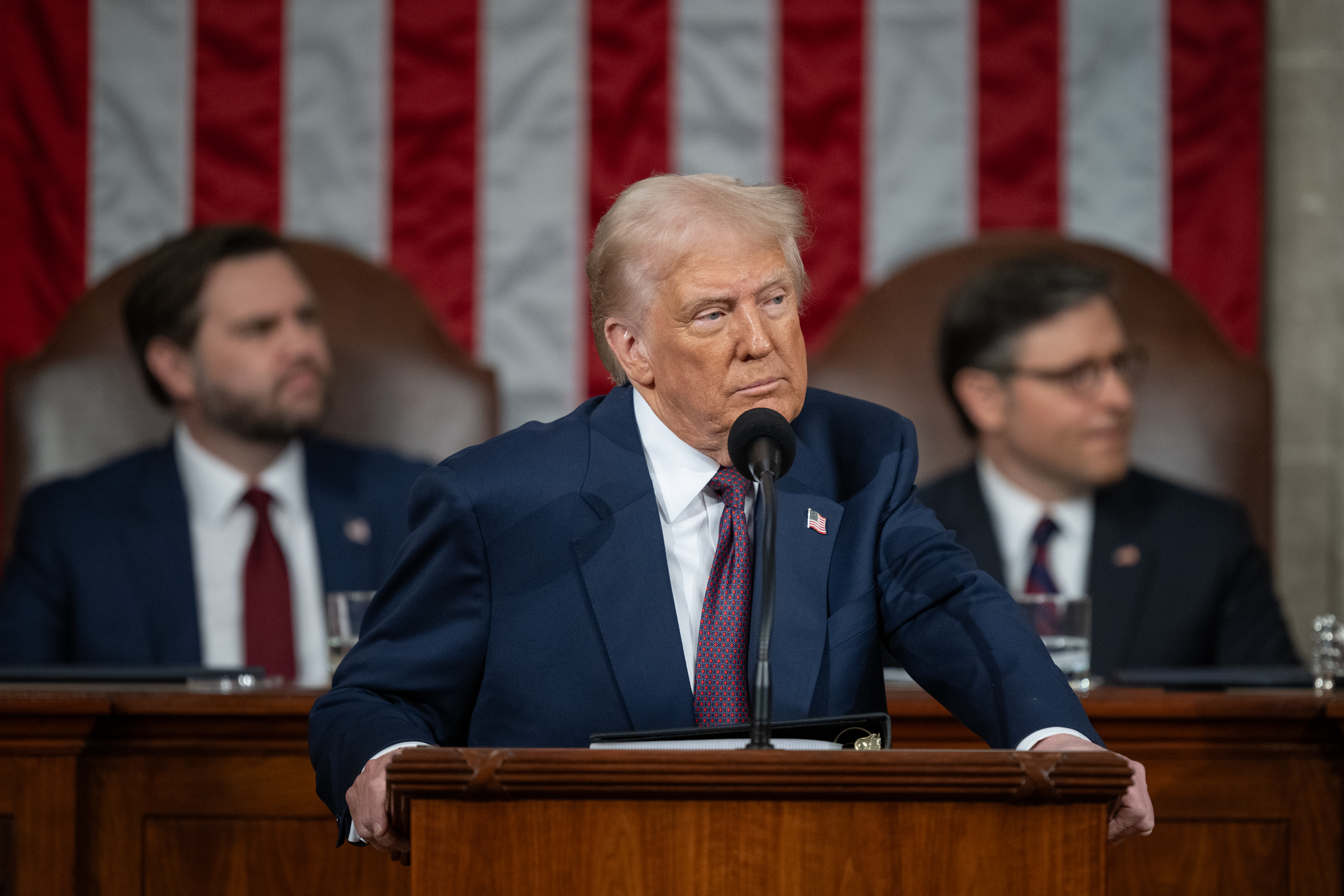
President Donald Trump addressing the Congress, with Vice President JD Vance and House Speaker Mike Johnson behind him

Trump began his speech at 9:19 p.m. EST from the United States Congress. He discussed the price of eggs, energy prices, supporting police officers and firefighters, a peace agreement for ending the Russo-Ukrainian War, and tariffs. His speech ended at 10:59 p.m. EST. The speech lasted 1 hour and 39 minutes, making it the longest address to a joint session of Congress in at least 61 years.

=== Content ===
During the speech, Trump commended the actions by Elon Musk and DOGE which he touted as being headed by Musk. This is contrary to what had been reported by the White House in a recent court filling and Press Secretary Karoline Leavitt who have named Amy Gleason as the acting head of DOGE.

Towards the end of the speech, Trump made a statement directed at Ukrainian president Volodymyr Zelenskyy that The New York Times described as "conciliatory." Trump mentioned negotiations on the mineral resources deal between the two countries, saying that Zelenskyy was ready to sign the agreement. Trump also questioned continued U.S. funding for Ukraine, rhetorically asking, "Do you want to keep it going for another five years?" He then added, "Yeah, yeah, you would say, 'Pocahontas says yes.'" This remark was widely interpreted as a reference to Senator Elizabeth Warren, whom Trump has previously nicknamed "Pocahontas" due to her past claims of Native American ancestry.

Trump announced an executive order that would rename the Anahuac National Wildlife Refuge to the Jocelyn Nungaray National Wildlife Refuge in the memory of the girl, who was sexually assaulted and murdered by Venezuelan illegal immigrants. Trump also mentioned her love for nature when renaming the refuge.

==== Factuality and misleading statements ====
Multiple independent and fact-checking organizations noted multiple false or misleading statements on topics such as Social Security, the economy, immigration, and foreign policy. In one instance, Trump stated that "21 million people poured into the United States" during the Biden administration. PBS, the Associated Press, and NBC reported that the statement was exaggerated and that the number of illegal migrants apprehended at the border during the Biden administration was 10.4, 10.8, or 14 million respectively. In September 2024, Congressional Republicans estimated that at least 2 million illegal migrants during this period were not apprehended.

At another point Trump claimed to have inherited a disastrous economy that was raked by inflation; however, fact checkers later reported that inflation had reduced significantly since the COVID-19 pandemic, and unemployment was well below historic norms.

When discussing government spending, Trump falsely alleged that the Biden administration had spent "$8 million for making mice transgender". Though the White House later cited federally funded studies meant to improve gender-affirming care using mice experiments, none of the cited studies were focused on "making mice transgender."

Trump also alleged a disparity between humanitarian aid offered from the United States to Ukraine versus the offered aid from Europe, claiming that the US had sent about $350 billion compared to Europe's about $100 billion. However, congressional records show that the US aid sent to Ukraine since 2022 was around $175 billion. According to figures from the Kiel Institute for the World Economy, the US had allocated $121 billion with an additional $5 billion committed. European countries had contributed around $140 billion with an additional $122 billion in committed funds.

== Protests and disruptions ==
While Trump talked about his election victory and mandate, Speaker Mike Johnson directed the House sergeant at arms William McFarland to remove Democratic representative Al Green, who repeatedly shouted that Trump had not received a mandate. Green was later censured by the House for this behavior. A majority of Democratic women in the chamber wore either white or pink outfits to call attention to women's rights as well as how Trump's administration could negatively impact women and their families. During the speech, some Democrats protested silently: some dressed in symbolic colors, five walked out during the speech, and more than twenty held up signs with the phrases "Save Medicaid", "False", and "Musk steals".

== Guests and attendees ==
There were many guests at the speech, including family members of Laken Riley and Jocelyn Nungaray, two individuals who were murdered by individuals who had entered the country illegally. Another guest, 13-year-old DJ Daniel, had been diagnosed with brain cancer in 2018, and had previously been sworn in as an honorary law enforcement officer. During the speech, Trump asked for Secret Service director Sean M. Curran to make Daniel an honorary agent.

Marc Fogel, who was recently released from Russia, and his family; the family of Corey Comperatore, who was killed during the Trump assassination attempt in Butler, Pennsylvania; the widow of a police officer killed at a traffic stop; and a steel plant worker were also invited. Payton McNabb, who raised claims that she was injured by a transgender athlete's spike in a high school volleyball game, and January Littlejohn, who sued a school district in Florida after raising claims that they had allowed her child to socially transition without her knowledge were also present.

Two guests were invited by First Lady Melania Trump, including a 15-year-old victim of deepfake images as Melania as part of her campaign against deepfakes and revenge porn and a college student who benefited by a championed cause for supporting foster children.

Four Supreme Court justices attended: Chief Justice John Roberts, and associate justices Elena Kagan, Brett Kavanaugh, and Amy Coney Barrett, in addition to retired justice Anthony Kennedy. The event was also the last public appearance of first-term Congressman Sylvester Turner before his death in the early hours of March 5, 2025.

== Responses ==
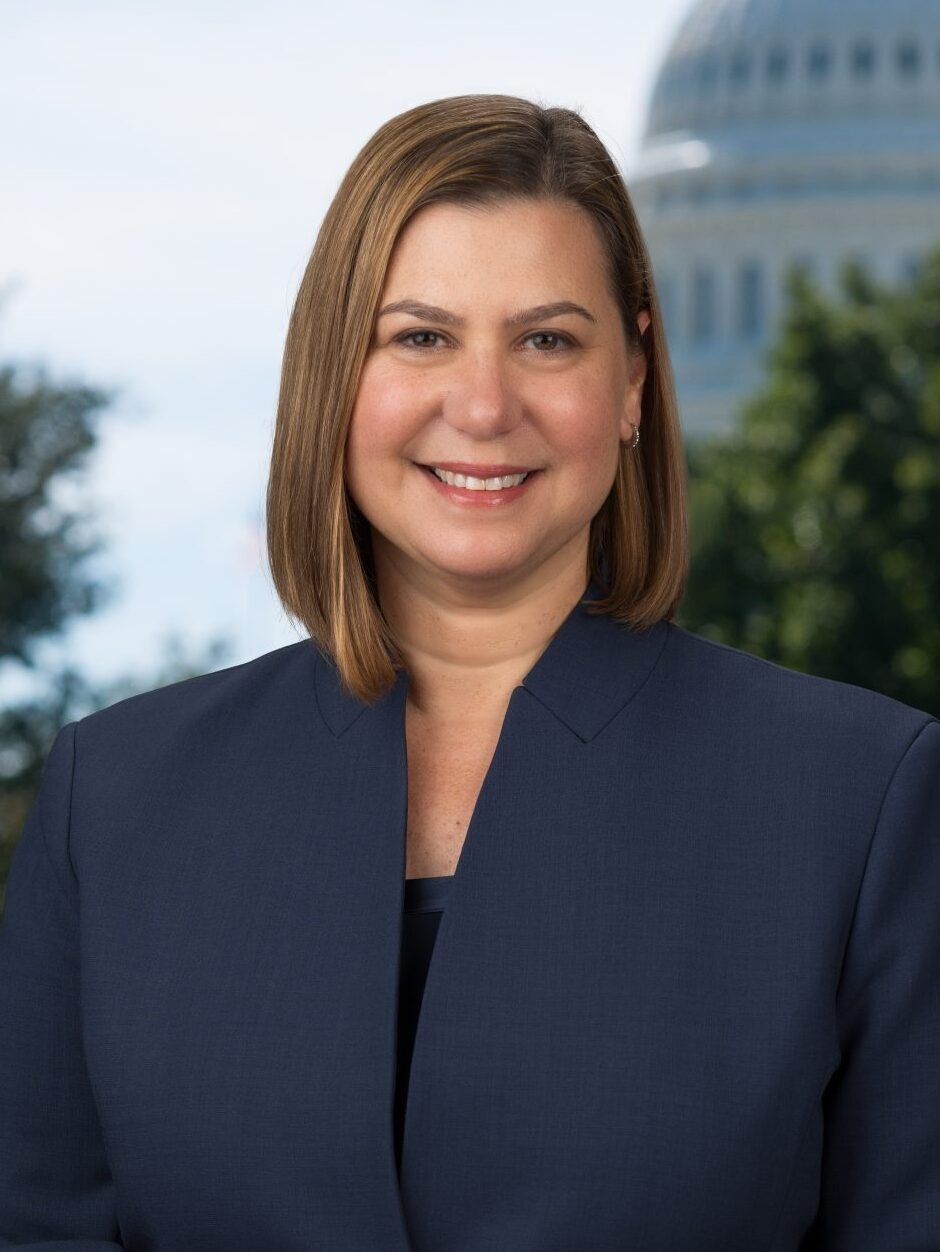
Senator Elissa Slotkin

Democratic senator Elissa Slotkin of Michigan gave the official Democratic response while Representative Adriano Espaillat of New York delivered a response in Spanish. Representative Alexandria Ocasio-Cortez responded on Instagram Live after the address to Congress.

Democratic representative Lateefah Simon of California delivered the Working Families Party response.

Independent Senator Bernie Sanders of Vermont also delivered a response after the address to Congress.

After the speech, a video was shared online that showed a majority of Democratic members of Congress remaining seated and not clapping at the mention of DJ Daniel, in contrast to Republican members of Congress. Snopes affirmed the video's authenticity but reported that many Democrats stood or clapped for Daniel at other points during the speech. Snopes also noted that Supreme Court justices and Joint Chiefs of Staff sat on the Democrats' side of the room. In an interview with Fox News on March 6, Senator John Fetterman said, "I don't know why we can't fully celebrate [...] I think that's something we could all celebrate."

== Reception ==
A CNN/SSRS poll found that viewership of the speech was 14 points more Republican than the general public. Before the speech, 60% of those who watched the speech approved of Trump's presidency, compared to 48% of the general population. The speech modestly improved watchers' opinion of Trump. The poll found that approximately 70% of watchers approved of the speech, and 44% strongly approved. After watching, a majority of at least 65% was confident in his leadership. Among those polled, the approval rate of Trump's proposed policies regarding immigration was 76%, higher than 63% for his policies regarding the function of government and his policies towards Ukraine, 62% for his economic policies, 61% for his foreign policy, 58% for his policies towards Russia, and 56% for his tariff policy.

CBS/YouGov polling also found that viewership was heavily Republican, with 51% of speech watchers describing themselves as Republican, 27% as independents, and 20% as Democrats. The heavy Republican viewership was described as normal and in line with historical trends of the president's party drawing more viewership from partisans. Polling done after the speech on viewers found that 76% approved of Trump's speech, and that responses of approval were largely along partisan lines. It also found that 80% of those who watched disapproved of Green's disruption.

On United States television the speech drew an estimated 36.6 million viewers, higher than Joe Biden's 2021 speech to a joint session of Congress which drew an estimated 26.9 million viewers, though lower than Trump's 2017 speech to a joint session of Congress which drew an estimated 47.7 million viewers. Nielsen also reported 70.7% of television viewers of the speech were 55 years or older, 20.5% were 35–54, and 5.7% were 18–34.

== International reactions ==
- Lesotho: Foreign Minister Lejone Mpotjoane criticized Trump's remark referring to Lesotho as a nation "which nobody has ever heard of," describing it as "quite insulting" and expressing shock that his country could be referred to in such a manner by the U.S. head of state.

== See also ==
- First 100 days of the second Trump presidency – Period from January to April 2025
- List of joint sessions of the United States Congress
- Timeline of the second Trump presidency (2025 Q1)

Preceded by 2024 State of the Union Address	State of the Union addresses 2025 joint session speech	Succeeded by 2026 State of the Union Address
