= Executive Order 14176 =

Declassifying JFK, RFK & MLK assassination files

- Declassification of Records Concerning the Assassinations of President John F. Kennedy, Senator Robert F. Kennedy, and the Reverend Dr. Martin Luther King, Jr.
- Front page of Executive Order 14176
- Type: Executive order
- Number: 14176
- President: Donald Trump
- Signed: January 23, 2025

Federal Register details
- Federal Register document number: 2025-02116
- Publication date: January 23, 2025

Summary
- Orders the declassification of documents relating to the assassinations of John F. Kennedy, Robert F. Kennedy, and Martin Luther King Jr.

Executive Order 14176, titled "Declassification of Records Concerning the Assassinations of President John F. Kennedy, Senator Robert F. Kennedy, and the Reverend Dr. Martin Luther King, Jr.", is an executive order signed by Donald Trump on January 23, 2025, to declassify records about the assassinations of John F. Kennedy, Robert F. Kennedy, and Martin Luther King. The John F. Kennedy assassination files were released in March 2025, the Robert F. Kennedy assassination files were released in April, May, and June 2025, and the Martin Luther King assassination files were released in July 2025.

== Background ==
President John F. Kennedy was assassinated on November 22, 1963. His younger brother Robert F. Kennedy was assassinated, having been shot on June 5, 1968, and dying the day after. Civil rights leader Martin Luther King Jr. was assassinated on April 4, 1968. These assassinations have attracted several conspiracy theories, which have been exacerbated by the fact that several documents have remained classified.

=== Earlier declassifications ===
A law signed during the presidency of George H. W. Bush ordered the declassification of all records relating to the assassination of President Kennedy in October 2017. When this time arrived during Donald Trump's first presidency, several documents were declassified; however, others remained classified. In 2021 President Joe Biden signed a presidential memorandum which created deadlines for more declassifications of documents about the assassination, which led to over 13,000 documents being released.

While Trump stated in his first presidency that he intended to declassify the remaining classified records, he later abstained from doing so due to appeals relating to national security reasons by the CIA and FBI. Subsequently, he later promised again during his 2024 presidential campaign to declassify the remaining documents.

== Provisions ==
The executive order says that the director of national intelligence will, within 15 days, develop a plan to release the records concerning the assassination of JFK, and develop plans within 45 days for RFK and King.

== Signing ==
Trump told his aide that the pen he used to sign the executive order is to be given to Robert F. Kennedy Jr., the son of RFK and nephew of JFK, and Trump's nominee for Secretary of Health and Human Services. Trump said "that's a big one" and "everything will be revealed" when referring to the executive order.

== See also ==
- List of executive orders in the second Trump presidency
- President John F. Kennedy Assassination Records Collection Act of 1992
- Martin Luther King Jr. Records Collection Act
