= Danielle Sassoon =

American attorney (born 1986)

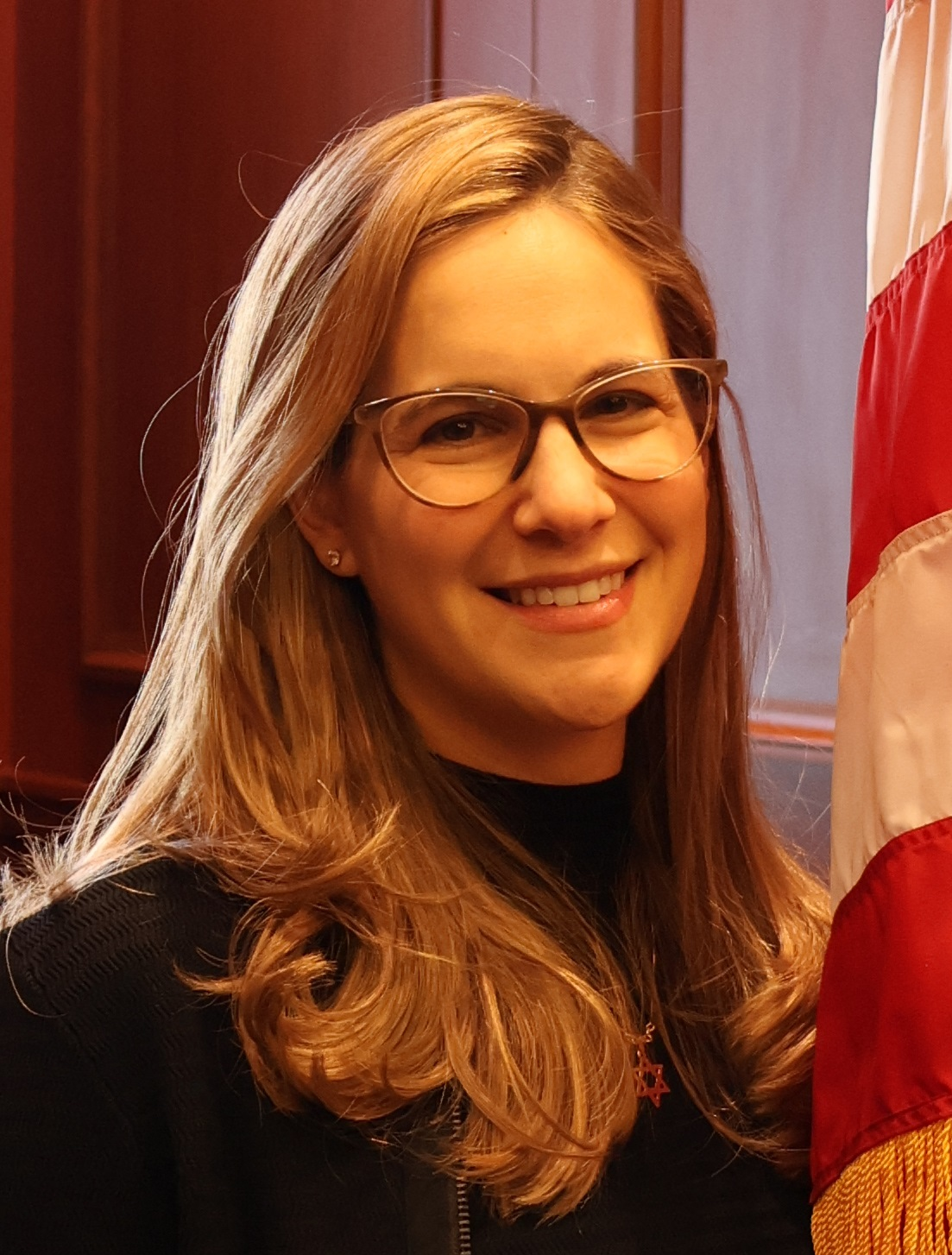
- Sassoon in 2025

United States Attorney for the Southern District of New York
- Acting
- In office January 21, 2025 – February 13, 2025
- President: Donald Trump
- Preceded by: Edward Kim (acting)
- Succeeded by: Matthew Podolsky (acting)

Personal details
- Born: Danielle Renee Sassoon; 1986 (age 39–40) New York City, U.S.
- Party: Republican
- Education: Harvard University (BA); Yale University (JD)

Danielle Renee Sassoon (born 1986) is an American attorney who served as the acting U.S. attorney for the Southern District of New York between January 21, 2025, and February 13, 2025. As an assistant United States attorney in the district, she secured prominent convictions against sex trafficker Larry Ray and fraudster Sam Bankman-Fried. Sassoon resigned from the United States Department of Justice to avoid complying with Acting United States Deputy Attorney General Emil Bove's command to dismiss federal criminal corruption charges against Eric Adams, Mayor of New York City. She currently is a partner at Clement & Murphy PLLC and a senior fellow at the conservative Manhattan Institute.

== Early life and education ==
Danielle Renee Sassoon was born in 1986 to Salomon (Sol) and Evelyn Sassoon in New York City. Her father was a partner at the law firm Morrison Cohen, and is now a partner at the law firm BakerHostetler; her mother worked as a clinical psychologist and research psychologist. Her grandmother escaped Syria to avoid the persecution against Syrian Jews before Israel was created in 1948. While attending the Ramaz School (2004), a Modern Orthodox Jewish school on the Upper East Side of Manhattan where she was first in her class, Sassoon studied the Talmud, which she credits as preparation for her future legal work.

Sassoon graduated magna cum laude from Harvard University with a Bachelor of Arts in history and literature in 2008. She then attended Yale Law School, where she was a features editor of The Yale Law Journal, graduating in 2011.

Sassoon subsequently served as a law clerk for conservative Judge J. Harvie Wilkinson III of the United States Court of Appeals for the Fourth Circuit. From July 2012 to August 2013, she clerked for conservative Justice Antonin Scalia of the U.S. Supreme Court. She then worked as a litigation associate at the law firm Kirkland & Ellis in its New York City office. In the spring term of 2016, she co-taught a Supreme Court seminar as an adjunct professor at New York University School of Law.

== Prosecutions ==
In 2016, Sassoon was hired as an assistant United States Attorney by Preet Bharara, the U.S. Attorney for the Southern District of New York. Working in the Violent and Organized Crime Unit, she concentrated on murder and racketeering cases. During her tenure, she secured a 60-year sentence against Larry Ray for extortion and sex trafficking of students at Sarah Lawrence College. In 2023, Sassoon and fellow assistant U.S. attorney Nicholas Roos prevailed in the trial of Sam Bankman-Fried, securing a 25-year sentence for fraud, conspiracy, and money laundering. Sassoon personally handled the cross-examination of Bankman-Fried at the trial.

She then served as Co-Chief of Criminal Appeals. In 2023, she received the Women in Federal Law Enforcement Top Prosecutor Award. In 2024, she was awarded the FBI Director's Award for Outstanding Criminal Investigation.

=== Mayor Eric Adams case and resignation ===
On January 21, 2025, President Donald Trump named Sassoon as acting United States Attorney for the Southern District of New York until the U.S. Senate confirmed Trump's U.S. Attorney nominee Jay Clayton. The following month, acting U.S. Deputy Attorney General Emil Bove instructed Sassoon to have lead attorney Hagan Scotten dismiss the federal criminal corruption charges against Eric Adams, Mayor of New York City, claiming that it would allow Adams to focus on immigration enforcement.

On February 12, 2025, Sassoon sent a letter to the head of the United States Justice Department, Attorney General Pam Bondi, stating she would resign if not allowed to proceed with her prosecution of Mayor Adams, indicating confidence that Adams was guilty of the charged crimes. In a footnote, Sassoon claimed that Adams' lawyers had demanded a quid pro quo, suggesting that he would be "in a position to assist with the (DOJ)'s enforcement priorities" only if the charges against him were dismissed. Bove accepted Sassoon's resignation the following day, stating that Sassoon's conduct would be investigated by the Office of the Attorney General, pursuant to Executive Order 14147. When asked, President Trump claimed he did not command the Justice Department to drop Adams' charges, later stating "I don't know if he or she resigned, but that U.S. attorney was fired".

== Personal life ==
On November 28, 2015, Sassoon married Adam Katz, an investment analyst. They met while attending Harvard University. Sassoon is a member of the conservative Federalist Society, and is a registered Republican.
