= Justice Manual =

Reference text for United States attorneys

The Justice Manual (known before 2018 as the United States Attorneys' Manual) is a looseleaf text designed as a quick and ready reference for United States attorneys and other employees of the United States Department of Justice responsible for the prosecution of violations of federal law. It contains general policies and guidance relevant to the work of the United States Attorneys' offices and to their relations with the legal divisions, investigative agencies, and other components within the Department of Justice.

The Manual is an internal document of the Department of Justice, and as such, does not have the force of law. It is updated periodically in much the same way as commercial looseleaf services are. New hard copies of the manual are issued annually to the department's attorneys. It is also available online.

== History ==
The last comprehensive update of the manual was in 2018, the first major revision in more than two decades. At the same time, the manual was renamed the Justice Manual. Two controversial changes in the revision were the removals of sections regarding press freedom and racial gerrymandering.

== Organization ==
The Justice Manual is divided into nine titles:

1. Organization and Functions
2. Appeals
3. Executive Office for United States Attorneys
4. Civil
5. Environment and Natural Resources Division
6. Tax
7. Antitrust
8. Civil Rights
9. Criminal

Each title has a corresponding Resource Manual that includes copies of policies, form letters, and other documents.
