= Trial of Ted Stevens =

American public corruption case

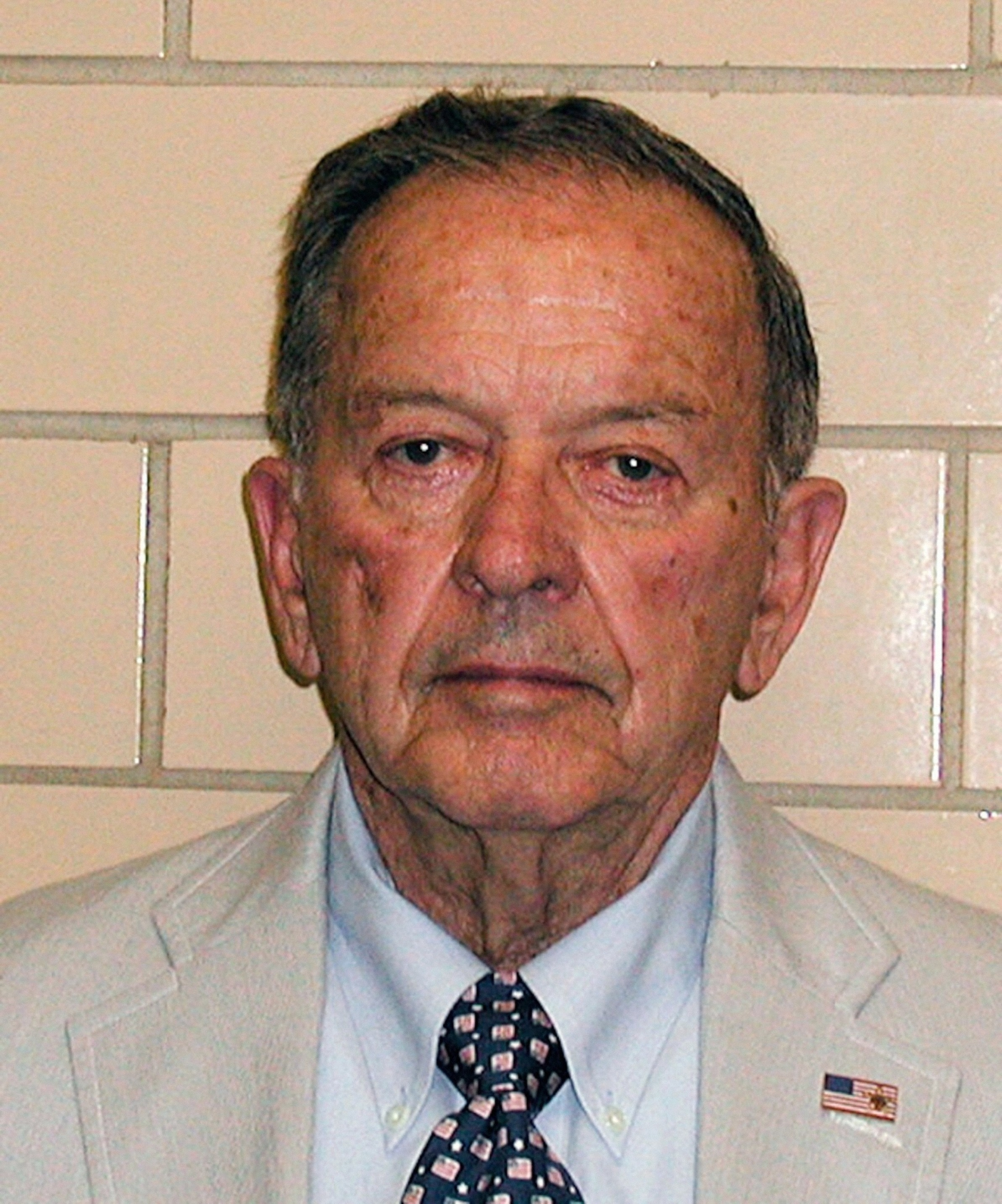
Mug shot of Stevens taken in July 2008

United States v. Senator Theodore F. Stevens was a criminal trial spanning from 2007 to 2009 of long-time U.S. Senator Ted Stevens as part of the Alaska political corruption probe. Stevens was the main source of coverage of the probe, indicted by a jury on July 29, 2008 and convicted on seven felony charges of corruption on October 27, 2008, which cost him re-election in the Senate race a week later. The conviction was vacated and rendered null six months later, with the federal judge declaring that the prosecution was one of the worst cases of prosecutorial misconduct he had ever seen.

Stevens pled not guilty, publicly declaring "I'm innocent." Stevens asserted his right to a speedy trial and requested that the trial be held before the 2008 election. U.S. District Judge in Washington, D.C. Emmet G. Sullivan, on October 2, 2008, denied the mistrial petition of Stevens's chief counsel, Brendan Sullivan, that made allegations of withholding evidence by prosecutors. Thus, the latter were admonished and would submit themselves for an internal probe by the United States Department of Justice. Brady v. Maryland requires prosecutors to give a defendant any material exculpatory evidence. Judge Sullivan had earlier admonished the prosecution for sending home to Alaska a witness who might have helped the defense.

In February 2009, FBI agent Chad Joy filed a whistleblower affidavit, alleging that prosecutors and FBI agents conspired to withhold and conceal evidence that could have resulted in acquittal. As a result of Joy's affidavit and claims by the defense that prosecutorial misconduct had caused an unfair trial, Judge Sullivan ordered a hearing to be held to determine whether a new trial should be ordered. At the hearing, Judge Sullivan held the prosecutors in contempt for having failed to deliver documents to Stevens's legal counsel.

On April 1, 2009, on behalf of U.S. Attorney General Eric Holder, Paul O'Brien submitted an order to set aside the case. Federal judge Emmet G. Sullivan soon signed the order. Since it occurred prior to sentencing it had the effect of vacating Stevens's conviction. Holder was reportedly very angry at the prosecutors' apparent withholding of exculpatory evidence and wanted to send a message that prosecutorial misconduct would not be tolerated under his watch. After Sullivan held the prosecutors in contempt, Holder replaced the entire trial team, including top officials in the public integrity section. The final straw for Holder was the discovery of a previously undocumented interview with Bill Allen that raised the possibility prosecutors had knowingly allowed Allen to perjure himself.

On April 7, 2009, judge Sullivan formally accepted Holder's motion to set aside the verdict and throw out the indictment, declaring "There was never a judgment of conviction in this case. The jury's verdict is being set aside and has no legal effect," and calling it the worst case of prosecutorial misconduct he'd ever seen.

== Stevens' house remodeling and VECO ==
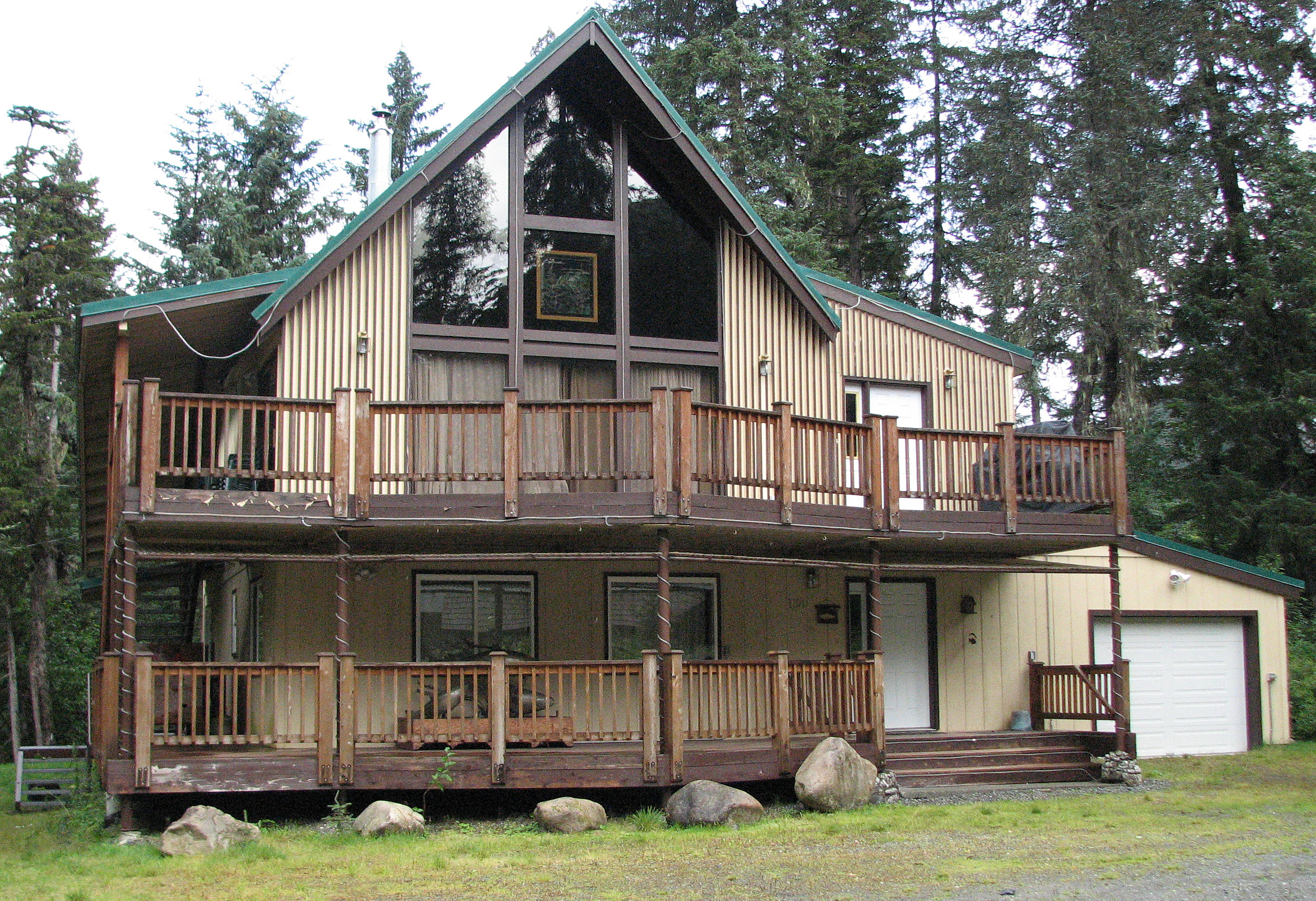
Stevens's home in Girdwood, Alaska

On May 29, 2007, the Anchorage Daily News reported that the FBI and a federal grand jury were investigating an extensive remodeling project at Stevens's home in Girdwood. Stevens's Alaska home was raided by the FBI and IRS on July 30, 2007. The remodeling work doubled the size of the modest home. Public records show that the house was 2,471 square feet (230 m^{2}) after the remodeling, and that the property was valued at $271,300 in 2003, including a $5,000 increase in land value. The remodel in 2000 was organized by Bill Allen, a founder of the VECO Corporation (an oil-field service company) and was alleged by prosecutors to have cost VECO and the various contractors $250,000 or more. However, the residential contractor who finished the renovation for VECO, Augie Paone, "believes the [Stevens's] remodeling could have cost – if all the work was done efficiently – around $130,000 to $150,000, close to the figure Stevens cited last year." Stevens paid $160,000 for the renovations "and assumed that covered everything".

In June, the Anchorage Daily News reported that a federal grand jury in Washington, D.C., heard evidence in May about the expansion of Stevens's Girdwood home and other matters connecting Stevens to VECO. In mid-June, FBI agents questioned several aides who worked for Stevens as part of the investigation. In July, Washingtonian magazine reported that Stevens had hired "Washington's most powerful and expensive lawyer", Brendan Sullivan Jr., in response to the investigation. In 2006, during wiretapped conversations with Bill Allen, shortly after the VECO offices were searched and Allen agreed to cooperate with the investigation, Stevens expressed worries over legal complications arising from the sweeping federal investigations into Alaskan politics. "The worst that can happen to us is we run up a bunch of legal fees, and might lose and we might have to pay a fine, might have to serve a little time in jail. I hope to Christ it never gets to that, and I don't think it will," Stevens said. Stevens continued, "I think they might be listening to this conversation right now, for Christ Sake." On the witness stand, Allen testified that VECO staff who had worked on his own house had charged "way too much", leaving him uncertain – that he would be embarrassed to bill Stevens for overpriced labor.
