= Emil Bove =

American judge (born 1981)

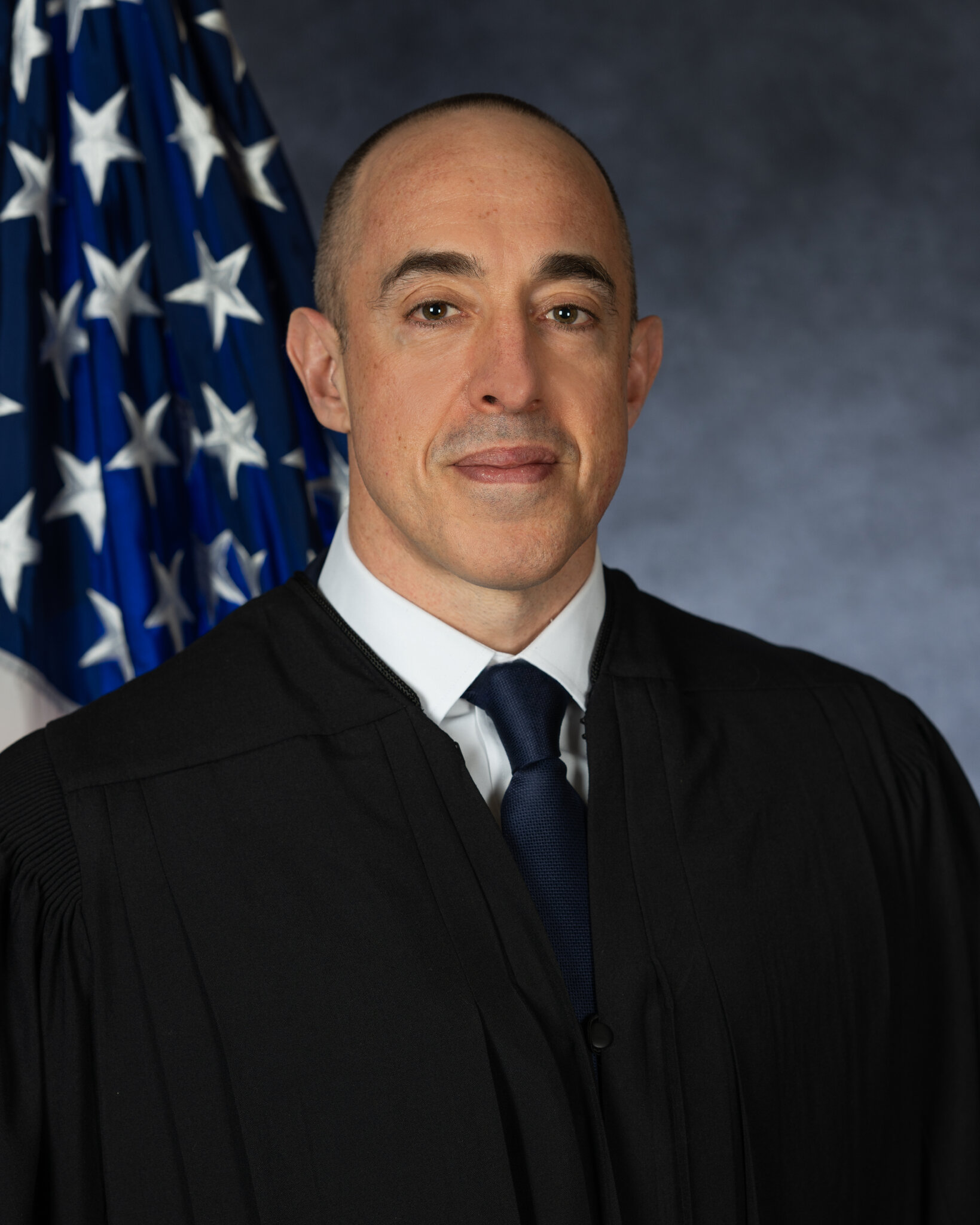
- Official portrait, 2026

Judge of the United States Court of Appeals for the Third Circuit
- Incumbent
- Assumed office September 2, 2025
- Appointed by: Donald Trump
- Preceded by: Joseph A. Greenaway Jr.

Acting United States Deputy Attorney General
- In office January 20, 2025 – March 6, 2025
- President: Donald Trump
- Preceded by: Lisa Monaco
- Succeeded by: Todd Blanche

Principal Associate Deputy Attorney General
- In office January 20, 2025 – September 2, 2025
- President: Donald Trump
- Preceded by: Marshall Miller
- Succeeded by: Trent McCotter

Personal details
- Born: Emil Joseph Bove III; 1981 (age 44–45) Geneva, New York, U.S.
- Spouse: Sarah Samis (m. 2012)
- Education: University at Albany, SUNY (BA); Georgetown University (JD)

Emil Joseph Bove III (/eɪmɪl boʊˈviː/; AY-mill BOH-vee; born 1981) is an American attorney who has served as a United States circuit judge of the United States Court of Appeals for the Third Circuit since September 2025. Before that, he served at the Department of Justice as principal associate deputy attorney general from January to September 2025, including as acting deputy attorney general from January to March 2025.

Bove studied public policy and economics at the University at Albany, SUNY and graduated from Georgetown University Law Center in 2008. He clerked for judges Richard J. Sullivan and Richard C. Wesley and became an associate at Sullivan & Cromwell before returning to federal employment as assistant United States attorney for the Southern District of New York in 2012. Bove was appointed co-chief of the office's terrorism and international narcotics unit in October 2019. He resigned in December 2021 and later joined Donald Trump's legal team in September 2023.

On November 14, 2024, President-elect Donald Trump announced Bove would serve as principal associate deputy attorney general in his incoming administration. Bove was appointed acting deputy attorney general in January 2025 and served in the position until Todd Blanche was confirmed in March. Bove was involved in several controversies at the Department of Justice, including the dismissal of a criminal corruption case against Eric Adams, the mayor of New York City, and multiple whistleblower allegations that he suggested ignoring a federal court order to lawyers in a case involving the deportation of Venezuelans to El Salvador.

On May 28, 2025, President Trump announced his nomination of Bove to serve on the U.S. Court of Appeals for the Third Circuit. Bove was subsequently confirmed by the U.S. Senate on July 24, 2025. Bove assumed judgeship on September 2, 2025.

== Early life and education (1981–2008) ==
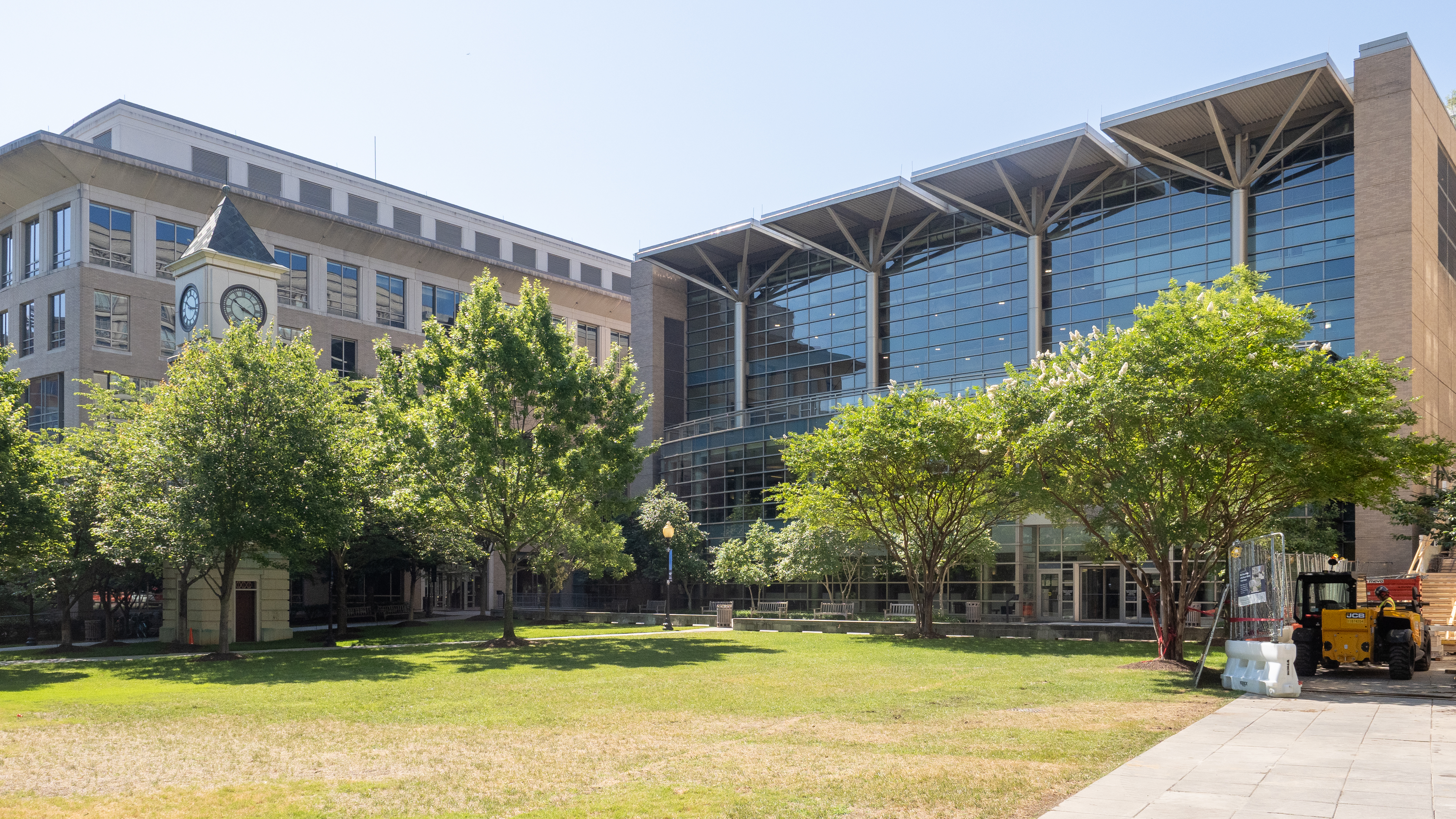
Georgetown University Law Center, where Bove studied (pictured in 2024)

Emil Joseph Bove III was born in 1981 in Geneva, New York, and was raised in Seneca Falls, New York. His father, Emil Bove Jr., is an attorney. The elder Bove served as an assistant New York attorney general at the Rochester office. In 1999, the younger Bove graduated salutatorian from Mynderse Academy, where he participated in the school's soccer, basketball, and lacrosse teams. He went on to graduate from the University at Albany, SUNY summa cum laude in 2003 with a Bachelor of Arts in public policy and economics. At SUNY Albany, Bove captained the Albany Great Danes men's lacrosse team. He was named the America East Conference Male Scholar Athlete in 2003. After graduating, Bove worked as a paralegal in the United States District Court for the Southern District of New York before leaving in 2005 to attend Georgetown University Law Center, graduating in 2008 with a Juris Doctor. He was the editor-in-chief of The Georgetown Law Journal's Annual Review of Criminal Procedure.

== Career ==
=== Clerkship and private practice (2008–2011) ===
From 2008 to 2009, Bove clerked for Judge Richard J. Sullivan of the United States District Court for the Southern District of New York. The following year, he clerked for Judge Richard C. Wesley of the United States Court of Appeals for the Second Circuit. After his clerkships, Bove was employed as an associate at Sullivan & Cromwell.

=== Assistant United States attorney and return to private practice (2012–2021) ===
In 2012, Preet Bharara, the United States Attorney for the Southern District of New York, hired Bove as an assistant United States attorney. Bove was appointed co-chair of the office's terrorism and international narcotics unit in October 2019. Prominent prosecutions Bove led included those against Nicolás Maduro, Cesar Sayoc, Tony Hernández, Ahmad Khan Rahimi, and Fabio Lobo. In 2018, he sought a supervisory position; Bove was denied a promotion after a group of defense attorneys wrote a letter expressing concerns about his legal tactics. Bove assisted in identifying numerous participants of the January 6 Capitol attack. He resigned in December 2021.

Bove joined Chiesa, Shahinian & Giantomasi in their New York City office in January 2022. In September 2023, he became a partner at Blanche Law, a law firm founded by Todd Blanche. Days later, Bove joined Donald Trump's criminal defense team. In the state court criminal trial of Trump in New York, he was second chair to Blanche on Trump's defense team. Bove represented Trump in the federal classified documents and election obstruction cases.

== Department of Justice (January–September 2025) ==
On November 14, 2024, President-elect Donald Trump announced that Bove would serve as principal associate deputy attorney general. On January 20, 2025, Bove was appointed acting deputy attorney general. Within days, he sent a memorandum threatening to prosecute local officials who refuse to comply with requests from the department following through on Trump's immigration policy. Bove later stated that Carla B. Freedman, the United States Attorney for the Northern District of New York, was investigating Tompkins County sheriff Derek Osborne, who allegedly allowed a Mexican citizen to be released from jail after pleading guilty to assault in the third degree. That month, he instructed the leadership of the Federal Bureau of Investigation to compile a list of prosecutors involved in criminal proceedings in the January 6 Capitol attack. Hours later, over twelve federal prosecutors in the United States attorney's office for the District of Columbia who investigated the attack were dismissed. Bove moved to exert greater authority over the bureau, accusing acting director Brian Driscoll and his deputy, Robert Kissane, of "insubordination" in February for refusing to provide the list of names he requested. According to The Wall Street Journal, he threatened to fire Driscoll. Senator Dick Durbin accused Kash Patel of directing the dismissals of career civil servants that Bove carried out.

Communications between federal prosecutors and the legal team of Eric Adams, the mayor of New York City, had gone through Bove since he took office, according to The New York Times. Bove moved to dismissfederal corruption charges against Adams in February, arguing that the indictment interfered with the New York City Democratic mayoral primary. The move to dismiss the case led to several resignations, including Danielle Sassoon, the acting United States Attorney for the Southern District of New York, Hagan Scotten, an assistant United States attorney in the district, and five prosecutors associated with the Department of Justice's Public Integrity Section. In court, Bove told Judge Dale Ho that there was no quid pro quo. When he dismissed the case, Ho stated that the situation "smacks of a bargain" where the indictment was dismissed "in exchange for immigration policy concessions".

In June 2025, Erez Reuveni, a former lawyer for the department, filed a whistleblower report alleging that Bove had alerted select department lawyers that Trump would soon invoke the Alien Enemies Act in order to deport Venezuelans to a prison in El Salvador. Bove purportedly stated that if a court order attempted to prevent the deportation flights, the Department of Justice would consider "telling the courts 'fuck you'" and "ignore any such order." The following day, in J.G.G. v. Trump, Judge James Boasberg ordered planes in the air to return; despite Reuveni's concerns about contempt of court, Bove allegedly told the Department of Homeland Security that the flights did not need to return. In April, Boasberg ruled that there was probable cause to start criminal contempt proceedings involving non-custodial writs of habeas corpus, though he lacked jurisdiction over the Venezuelans, and in June, he issued a separate ruling involving custodial writs of habeas corpus—which the court did have authority over—that the deportees had been deprived of their right to due process. Reuveni's lawyers later released copies of text messages from the day of the flights and an email from the day after that supported his allegations. Tom Joscelyn and Ryan Goodman of Just Security wrote that the email and text messages implicate Bove in both contempt of court and violating due process rights. Bove's tenure was widely viewed as controversial; (Note: Attributed to multiple sources:) Bove acknowledged that some of his decisions "generated controversy", but said that the media were promoting a "wildly inaccurate caricature" of him.

In October 2026, Jill Fields, a former FBI supervisory intelligence analyst, filed a whistleblower report alleging that in early 2025, Bove ordered the Los Angeles field office to investigate protesters' demonstrations outside the federal building, despite the protests being protected speech.

== Judge of the Court of Appeals for the Third Circuit (2025–present) ==
In May 2025, The New York Times reported that Donald Trump was considering Bove for a seat on the United States Court of Appeals for the Third Circuit, the one last held by Joseph A. Greenaway Jr. Joe Biden had previously nominated Adeel A. Mangi to fill that same vacancy. On May 28, Trump announced he would select Bove for the appellate court. Bove's name was formally sent to the Senate on June 16. Bove appeared before the Senate Committee on the Judiciary on June 25. The committee's chairman, Chuck Grassley, preemptively defended him from Erez Reuveni's allegations. He faced questions over the decision to dismiss Eric Adams's case and the Department of Justice resignations that followed. He was also questioned about Reuveni's allegations; Joscelyn and Goodman argue that if the allegations are true, then Bove made false statements in his testimony. Grassley later characterized the allegations as nothing more than "aggressively litigating and interpreting court orders" on behalf of clients.

In July, six former federal prosecutors for the District of Columbia sent a letter urging the Senate Judiciary Committee to reject Bove's nomination, referring to him as "the worst conceivable nominee" to be appointed for an indefinite judicial position. The same month, more than seventy-five former state and federal judges wrote to the committee that Bove was disqualified on the basis of his "egregious record of mistreating law enforcement officers, abusing power, and disregarding the law itself". The judges expressed concern about Trump having nominated someone who had previously served as his personal lawyer and who might demonstrate "fealty" to Trump. Other groups in opposition to his confirmation included the Society for the Rule of Law Institute and the Leadership Conference on Civil and Human Rights, while Republican attorneys general from twenty states supported Bove in a letter. The day before the committee was scheduled to vote on whether to advance Bove's nomination, Justice Connection sent the committee a letter signed by over nine hundred former Department of Justice attorneys voicing "deep concern" about Bove's nomination; in response, senator Dick Durbin, the ranking member on the committee, encouraged the committee to postpone the vote.

Before the Senate Committee on the Judiciary's scheduled vote, Democratic members called to have Reuveni testify, but the request was rebuffed. On July 17, 2025, the committee voted to advance Bove's nomination. Prior to the vote, most of the Democrats on the committee walked out in protest, seeking to have further debate on the nomination prior to a committee vote. Grassley stated that proceeding was no different than what Democrats had done years prior as the controlling party by cutting off debate regarding two of president Joe Biden's judicial nominees. Durbin's spokesperson said that the Republicans had violated Senate rules and the Democrats would question the parliamentarian about whether the vote was valid. Later that month, two other whistleblowers came forward, one with evidence that allegedly contradicts Bove's Senate Judiciary Committee testimony about the dismissal of the case against Eric Adams, and another with evidence corroborating Reuveni's allegations. Both whistleblowers provided evidence to the Justice Department's inspector general.

On July 24, 2025, the U.S. Senate invoked cloture on his nomination in a 50–48 vote, and on July 29, 2025 voted to confirm Bove by a 50–49 vote. Every Republican senator, with the exception of Susan Collins and Lisa Murkowski, voted to confirm him, while every Democratic senator opposed his nomination. Senator Bill Hagerty was not present to vote. Bove received his judicial commission on August 20, but was not immediately sworn in. He continued to work at the Department of Justice through that time. Bove was sworn in on September 2.

== Personal life ==
In 2012, Bove married Sarah Samis in a ceremony officiated by Judge Richard J. Sullivan.

== See also ==
- Donald Trump judicial appointment controversies

== Works cited ==
=== Articles ===
- Adams, David; Ernst, Jeff (January 19, 2022). "New York anti-narcotics prosecutor leaves, raising questions about major drug trafficking cases". Univision.
- Alexander, Robert (September 3, 2025). "Donald Trump's Former Lawyer Secures Lifetime Judge Role". Newsweek.
- Balk, Tim (July 16, 2025). "Ex-Justice Dept. Lawyers Urge Senate Not to Confirm Emil Bove as Federal Judge". The New York Times.
- Barrett, Devlin (November 14, 2024). "Trump Picks Todd Blanche, His Defense Lawyer, to Be Deputy Attorney General". The New York Times.
- Barrett, Devlin (June 24, 2025). "Justice Dept. Leader Suggested Violating Court Orders, Whistle-Blower Says". The New York Times.
- Barrett, Devlin (June 25, 2025). "The confirmation hearing for Emil Bove III, a senior Trump administration official nominated to a federal appeals court in Philadelphia, has begun with the Republican chairman of the Senate Judiciary Committee defending him in the face of a whistle-blower complaint that Bove suggested subordinates at the Justice Department ignore court orders". The New York Times.
- Barrett, Devlin (June 25, 2025). "At his confirmation hearing to be an appeals court judge, Emil Bove III addressed his role in ending the criminal case against New York City's mayor, Eric Adams". The New York Times.
- Barrett, Devlin (August 20, 2025). "Emil Bove Continued to Work at Justice Dept. After Judicial Confirmation". The New York Times.
- Beitsch, Rebecca (June 25, 2025). "Bove scrutinized for judgeship amid allegations he suggested saying 'f— you' to courts". The Hill.
- Beitsch, Rebecca (July 15, 2025). "Senate Democrats demand hearing with DOJ whistleblower ahead of Bove vote". The Hill.
- Cassens Weiss, Debra (May 29, 2025). "Trump nominates his lawyer Emil Bove to 3rd Circuit". ABA Journal. Archived from the original on July 1, 2025.
- Cheney, Kyle; Orden, Erica (September 26, 2023). "Trump expands criminal defense team". Politico.
- Cotterill, Greg (April 29, 2024). "Former Seneca Falls Man Leading President Trump's Legal Team". Finger Lakes Daily News.
- Epstein, Kayla (November 14, 2024). "Trump rewards his lawyers with big government jobs". BBC News.
- Ernst, Jeff (October 8, 2019). "Witness directly involves the president of Honduras in the use of drug money for his campaigns". Univision.
- Fuchs, Hailey (July 17, 2025). "Senate Dems protest committee vote to advance Trump's judicial pick". Politico.
- Fuchs, Hailey (July 24, 2025). "Bove moves ahead in confirmation process despite Republican opposition". Politico.
- Goldman, Adam; Barrett, Devlin; Thrush, Glenn (January 31, 2025). "Trump Officials Fire Jan. 6 Prosecutors and Plan Possible F.B.I. Purge". The New York Times.
- Goldman, Adam; Thrush, Glenn; Weiser, Benjamin; Haberman, Maggie; Schmidt, Michael (February 25, 2025). "Justice Dept.'s No. 2 Targets Old Office Where He Rose as a Prosecutor". The New York Times.
- Gurman, Sadie (January 21, 2025). "Immigration Lawyer Will Lead Trump's DOJ Temporarily". The Wall Street Journal.
- Gurman, Sadie; Barber, Ryan; Viswanatha, Aruna (February 5, 2025). "How Trump's Sweeping Expulsions Have Thrown the FBI Into Chaos". The Wall Street Journal.
- Gurman, Sadie; Ramey, Corinne; Fanelli, James (February 13, 2025). "Top U.S. Prosecutors Resign After Order to Drop Eric Adams Case". The Wall Street Journal.
- Haberman, Maggie; Rashbaum, William; Barrett, Devlin; Bromwich, Jonah (January 29, 2025). "Justice Dept. Is Said to Discuss Dropping Case Against Eric Adams". The New York Times.
- Headley, Tiana (June 18, 2025). "Trump Submits Bove Nomination for Third Circuit New Jersey Seat". Bloomberg Law.
- Hornung, Lisa (July 27, 2025). "2nd whistleblower speaks out on Emil Bove appellate court appointment". UPI.
- Hsu, Spencer (July 8, 2025). "Former D.C. U.S. prosecutors oppose Emil Bove appeals court nomination". The Washington Post.
- Hudspeth Blackburn, Piper; Gangel, Jamie (July 15, 2025). "More than 75 former judges urge Senate committee to reject Trump judicial nominee Emil Bove". CNN.
- Joscelyn, Tom; Goodman, Ryan (July 11, 2025). "Whistleblower Documents Implicate Emil Bove in Criminal Contempt Order by Chief Judge Boasberg". Just Security.
- Katersky, Aaron; Reinstein, Julia (February 19, 2025). "Emil Bove denies 'quid pro quo' in dropping Eric Adams charges during court hearing". ABC News.
- Maag, Christopher; Sullivan, Eileen (January 30, 2025). "U.S. Says Sheriff Could Face Prosecution for Releasing Immigrant". The New York Times.
- Macagnone, Michael (June 24, 2025). "Emil Bove faces new accusation ahead of confirmation hearing". Roll Call.
- Mallin, Alexander; Faulders, Katherine (May 28, 2025). "Trump taps controversial top DOJ official for federal circuit court vacancy". ABC News.
- Mangan, Dan (April 2, 2025). "Judge dismisses criminal case against New York Mayor Eric Adams". NBC10 Philadelphia.
- Mansfield, Erin (June 25, 2025). "Emil Bove, Trump's former personal lawyer, faces renewed scrutiny for federal court seat". USA Today. Archived from the original on June 25, 2025.
- Neumeister, Larry; Durkin Richer, Alanna; Tucker, Eric (February 13, 2025). "Order to drop New York Mayor Adams' case roils Justice Department as high-ranking officials resign". AP News.
- Olechowski, Carol (September 5, 2010). "Like Family". UAlbany Magazine.
- Orden, Erica (February 23, 2025). "Before he became Trump's bulldog at DOJ, Emil Bove was nearly demoted for bellicose management style". Politico.
- Ordoñez, Franco (November 7, 2016). "Venezuelan president's nephews too 'stupid' to be drug kingpins, attorney says". Miami Herald.
- Porter, Susan Clark (September 23, 2023). "Mynderse graduate joins Trump's legal team". Finger Lakes Times.
- Protess, Ben; Bromwich, Jonah; Haberman, Maggie; Rashbaum, William (April 27, 2024). "Echoing Their Client, Trump's Lawyers Pursue an Absolutist Defense". The New York Times.
- Rabinowitz, Hannah; Perez, Evan; Reid, Paula; Polantz, Katelyn (February 11, 2025). "Top Justice officials who played key roles in January 6 cases now leading 'weaponization' review". CNN.
- Rashbaum, William; Rubinstein, Dana; Thrush, Glenn; Rothfeld, Michael; Bromwich, Jonah (February 10, 2025). "Push to Drop Adams Charges Reveals a Justice Dept. Under Trump's Sway". The New York Times.
- Raymond, Nate (May 16, 2016). "Son of ex-Honduran president pleads guilty to U.S. drug charge". Reuters.
- Reid, Paula; Gannon, Casey; Lybrand, Holmes (June 25, 2025). "Emil Bove: Trump judicial nominee denies allegations in whistleblower report and says he's not a 'henchman'". CNN.
- Rosen, Jacob; Montoya-Galvez, Camilo; Quinn, Melissa (June 4, 2025). "Trump administration must give due process to Venezuelan men sent to Salvadoran prison, judge rules". CBS News.
- "Sarah Samis, Emil Bove III". The New York Times. November 18, 2012.
- Savage, Charlie (February 11, 2025). "Senator Accuses F.B.I. Nominee of Covertly Directing Dismissals". The New York Times.
- Scannell, Kara; Perez, Evan; Rabinowitz, Hannah; Herb, Jeremy (February 14, 2025). "'It was never going to be me': How Trump's DOJ sparked a crisis and mass resignations over the Eric Adams case". CNN. Archived from the original on February 15, 2025.
- Shaw, David (December 11, 1981). "Seneca County salary increases included in budget". Syracuse Herald-Journal.
- Stein, Perry (June 25, 2025). "Trump judicial pick Bove to face skeptical Democrats at confirmation hearing". The Washington Post.
- Stein, Perry; Meyer, Theodoric; Leonnig, Carol D. (July 28, 2025). "Whistleblower evidence suggests Trump judicial nominee Emil Bove misled Senate". The Washington Post. ISSN 0190-8286.
- Stein, Perry; Meyer, Theodoric (July 29, 2025). "Senate confirms controversial Trump nominee Emil Bove as federal judge". The Washington Post.
- Thorp V, Frank; Gregorian, Dareh (July 17, 2025). "Democrats challenge whether Emil Bove's judicial nomination advanced after they walked out of vote". NBC News.
- Thrush, Glenn (January 22, 2025). "Justice Dept. to Investigate Local Officials Who Obstruct Immigration Enforcement". The New York Times.
- Thrush, Glenn; Barrett, Devlin; Feuer, Alan; Sullivan, Eileen (January 31, 2025). "More Than a Dozen Prosecutors at Washington U.S. Attorney's Office Are Dismissed". The New York Times.
- Thrush, Glenn; Goldman, Adam (February 5, 2025). "New Leaders of Justice Dept. Move to Assert Control Over Agency". The New York Times.
- Thrush, Glenn; Goldman, Adam; Bromwich, Jonah; Haberman, Maggie (February 7, 2025). "At Justice Dept., Trump's Former Criminal Defender Emerges as His Enforcer". The New York Times.
- Thrush, Glenn; Savage, Charlie (May 19, 2025). "Bove, Top Justice Dept. Official, Is Considered for Circuit Court Nomination". The New York Times.
- Thrush, Glenn; Savage, Charlie (May 28, 2025). "Trump Says He'll Nominate Bove to Federal Appeals Court". The New York Times.
- "Trump attorney, Seneca Falls native Emil Bove tapped for top DOJ role". FingerLakes1.com. November 15, 2024.
- "Who is Emil Bove?: Acting deputy attorney general expected in court for Adams hearing". WNBC. February 19, 2025.

=== Documents ===
- Bove, Emil (2025). "Questionnaire for Judicial Nominees" (PDF). United States Senate Committee on the Judiciary. Archived from the original (PDF) on June 25, 2025.

Legal offices
Preceded by Marshall Miller	Principal Associate Deputy Attorney General; 2025	Succeeded by Trent McCotter
Preceded by Lisa Monaco	United States Deputy Attorney General; Acting; 2025	Succeeded by Todd Blanche
Preceded by Joseph A. Greenaway Jr.	Judge of the United States Court of Appeals for the Third Circuit; 2025–present	Incumbent
