= Hagan Scotten =

American attorney

Personal details
- Born: Long Island, New York, U.S.
- Party: Republican
- Education: Georgetown University (BA); Harvard University (JD)

Military service
- Allegiance: United States
- Branch/service: United States Army
- Rank: Captain
- Unit: United States Army Special Forces; 5th Special Forces Group
- Commands: 5th Special Forces Group
- Battles/wars: Iraq War
- Awards: Bronze Star (2)

Hagan Scotten is an American attorney who was an Assistant United States Attorney for the Southern District of New York until his resignation in February 2025. He is a currently a partner at the law firm Hueston Hennigan.

== Early life and military service ==
Scotten was born on Long Island, New York.

Scotten served in the US Army for nine years. He served three combat tours in Iraq during the Iraq War as a captain in the United States Army Special Forces. He earned two Bronze Star Medals as a troop commander in the Fifth Special Forces Group. He was honorably discharged from the military in 2007.

== Education ==
Scotten graduated from Georgetown University in 1998 with a Bachelor of Arts, magna cum laude, in history and classics. In 2007, after his Army career, Scotten entered Harvard Law School, where he was a member of the Harvard Law Review and was named best oralist in the Ames Moot Court Competition. He graduated in 2010 ranked first in his class with a Juris Doctor, summa cum laude, receiving the Fay Diploma awarded each year to the Harvard Law valedictorian.

== Early legal career ==
After law school, Scotten was a law clerk to then-judge Brett Kavanaugh of the U.S. Court of Appeals for the D.C. Circuit from 2010 to 2011 and to Chief Justice John Roberts of the U.S. Supreme Court from 2011 to 2012.

After his clerkships, Scotten entered private practice as an associate at Hogan Lovells. Speaking on behalf of Supreme Court clerks, he said: "Most of us had $100,000 in law-school debt... Getting rid of that debt is a good way to start,” expressing a hope to return to government service.

== Assistant U.S. Attorney ==
As an Assistant U.S. Attorney, Scotten initially handled organized crime and gang cases, including the largest gang take down in the history of New York City, and the conviction of the leadership of the Luchese Family of La Cosa Nostra—one of the New York Mafia’s “Five Families”—for murder, racketeering, and other crimes. Scotten received the Attorney General’s Award for Distinguished Service for both cases. Scotten also tried and convicted Scott Tucker, the owner of a fraudulent $3.5 billion payday lending business.

Scotten later prosecuted public corruption offenses, including the conviction of former FBI Special Agent in Charge of Counterintelligence Charles McGonigal for violating U.S. sanctions against Russian oligarch Oleg Deripaska, the conviction of Lev Parnas for campaign finance and fraud crimes, and the conviction of bank CEO and chairman Stephen Calk for extending millions of dollars in risky loans in exchange for improper assistance in Calk’s attempt to become Secretary of the Army.

Scotten became co-chief of appeals for the Southern District of New York U.S. Attorney’s Office along with Danielle Sassoon.

As an Assistant US Attorney, Scotten handled corruption cases, securing a 9-year sentence against Lamor Whitehead for fraud in 2024.

In the summer of 2021, Scotten initiated an investigation into New York City Mayor Eric Adams. In September 2024, a grand jury seated in the Southern District of New York indicted Adams on charges of conspiracy, wire fraud, and bribery from Turkish officials.

In February 2025, acting U.S. Deputy Attorney General Emil Bove instructed interim United States attorney Danielle Sassoon, to whom Scotten reported, to have Scotten dismiss the charges against Adams without prejudice. Refusing to do so, Sassoon resigned on February 13, 2025, and in a letter criticized Bove's explicitly political motivations.

Hagan Scotten resignation letter

The following day, Scotten also resigned, writing that:

Any assistant U.S. attorney would know that our laws and traditions do not allow using the prosecutorial power to influence other citizens, much less elected officials. If no lawyer within earshot of the President is willing to give him that advice, then I expect you will eventually find someone who is enough of a fool, or enough of a coward, to file your motion. But it was never going to be me.
