= Executive Order 14147 =

2025 executive order by Donald Trump

- Ending the Weaponization of the Federal Government
- Front page of Executive Order 14147
- Type: Executive order
- Number: 14147
- President: Donald Trump
- Signed: January 20, 2025

Federal Register details
- Federal Register document number: 2025-01900
- Publication date: January 20, 2025

Executive Order 14147, titled Ending the Weaponization of the Federal Government, is an executive order signed by U.S. President Donald Trump on January 20, 2025. The order directs federal agencies to review prior actions and policies concerning alleged political bias or misuse of authority within the federal government.

== Background ==
Issued at the outset of Trump's second term, the order called for a review of the activities of the Department of Justice, other federal agencies exercising civil or criminal enforcement authority, and the intelligence community. It directed the attorney general and the director of national intelligence to review the activities of federal law enforcement and intelligence agencies for potential misuse of authority.

The order further instructed the attorney general to examine these agencies' activities over the previous four years for actions described by the administration as politically motivated or otherwise improper.

The order also established a Department of Justice working group to review alleged abuses in federal law enforcement investigations.
