= Timeline of the second Trump presidency (2025 Q4) =

The following is a timeline of the second presidency of Donald Trump during the fourth and last quarter of 2025, from October 1, 2025, to December 31, 2025. To navigate between quarters, see timeline of the Donald Trump presidencies.

== Timeline ==
=== October 2025 ===
Date	Events	Photos/videos
Wednesday October 1	A government shutdown begins at 12:01 a.m. EDT following the failure of Congress and President Trump to reach a compromise on a spending bill.; The Supreme Court rules that Federal Reserve Governor Lisa Cook is allowed to stay in her position until legal arguments in January 2026.; Office of Management and Budget Director Russell Vought announces the freezing of $18 billion in NYC infrastructure projects in an apparent attempt to punish democratic states for the government shutdown.; In a briefing, Vice President JD Vance laughs off accusations of racism and bigotry relating to Trump's post of Hakeem Jeffries with a fake mustache and a sombrero, saying "I don’t even know what that means."; Watchdog group Public Citizen files a complaint against the Small Business Administration and Department of Housing and Urban Development for violations of the Hatch Act regarding the shutdown.	Press Secretary Leavitt and Vice President Vance brief members of the media.
Thursday October 2	President Trump posts an AI video to Truth Social where Russell Vought is depicted as the grim reaper stating he was "...the reaper. He wields the pen, the funds and the brain."; Department of Education workers allege that their out of office messages were forcibly changed to blame Democrats for the shutdown.; Dr. Jeanne Marrazzo is fired from her position as National Institute of Allergy and Infectious Diseases director, weeks after filing a whistleblower report alleging the administration endangered research subjects, defied court orders and undermined vaccine research.; The White House sends letters to nine top public and private universities urging them to pledge support for President Trump’s political agenda in order to ensure access to federal research funds.	
Friday October 3	President Trump announces that Hamas had until October 5 at 6 p.m. EDT to decide on offered ceasefire deal or the group would be quickly extinguished.; Hamas says it has agreed to some of the plans proposed by President Trump's 20-point plan to end the war, including the release of hostages and handing over administration of the enclave.; The Treasury Department releases draft designs of a $1 coin bearing Trump's likeness to be released for the 250th anniversary of the United States.; Office of Management and Budget Director Russell Vought announces the freezing of $2.1 billion in Chicago infrastructure projects.; President Trump posts an AI video to Truth Social showing him throwing a Trump 2028 hat at House Minority Leader Hakeem Jeffries.; Secretary of Defense Pete Hegseth directs a lethal strike on a narco-trafficking vessel he claims is affiliated with designated terrorist organizations.	President Trump delivers remarks on Hamas' agreement to his proposed plan to end the war. Defense Secretary Pete Hegseth directs a lethal strike on a narco-trafficking vessel claimed to be affiliated with designated terrorist organizations.
Saturday October 4	A Border Patrol agent shoots Marimar Martinez, a US citizen falsely accused of attempting to ram agents with her vehicle.	
Sunday October 5	A federal judge blocks the deployment of additional National Guard troops to Portland.; President Trump and Secretary of Defense Pete Hegseth speak to about 10,000 gathered navy personnel at Naval Station Norfolk as part of the 250th Anniversary Celebration.; While speaking on Fox News, Homeland Security Secretary Kristi Noem calls Chicago a "warzone" after a woman was shot by federal agents.	
Monday October 6	The state of Illinois and Chicago, sues the Trump administration over the National Guard being deployed to the city.; National Economic Council Director Kevin Hassett states that it would be the Democrats' fault for any job loss during the shutdown.; President Trump and Brazilian president Luiz Inácio Lula da Silva, and Finance Minister Fernando Haddad speak over the phone about ending Trump's 50% tariffs on Brazilian imports.; While speaking to CNN News Central White House Deputy Chief of Staff Stephen Miller falsely claims that President Trump has plenary authority to deploy national guard troops into cities.; The Deputy Director of the CIA Michael Ellis replaces the agency's general counsel with himself.	
Tuesday October 7	President Trump holds a bilateral meeting with Canadian prime minister Mark Carney at the White House.; Attorney General Pam Bondi testifies to Senate Judiciary Committee.; Office of Management and Budget announces that furloughed federal workers are not entitled to back pay during the shutdown.	President Trump and Canadian prime minister Mark Carney
Wednesday October 8	In a Truth Social post, President Trump calls for the jailing of Illinois officials for "failing to protect ICE officers".; President Trump announces that his deal for a ceasefire between Israel and Hamas had been reached and that the remaining hostages would be released.; President Trump, members of his administration, independent journalists, and online commentators participate in a round table against the anti-fascist movement Antifa.; The Interior Department cancels the Esmerelda 7 project, which would have developed one of the world's largest solar power projects.	President Trump participates in a roundtable on Antifa.
Thursday October 9	President Trump holds a bilateral meeting with Finnish president Alexander Stubb and Finnish prime minister Petteri Orpo at the White House.; Hamas and Israel sign President Trump's ceasefire agreement.; New York Attorney General Letitia James is indicted in Virginia by President Trump's Justice Department, as Trump has continued to call for her to be prosecuted.; Treasury Secretary Scott Bessent announces a $20 billion bailout for Argentina which included a currency swap.	President Trump and Finnish president Alexander Stubb
Friday October 10	First Lady Melania Trump announces that 8 children displaced during the Russia-Ukraine war have been reunited with their families following talks with Russian President Vladimir Putin.; President Trump announces the second agreement with pharmaceutical company, AstraZeneca, to bring American drug prices in line with the lowest paid by other developed nations.; A spokes person for the Office of Management and Budget confirms after a post by Director Russell Vought that seven agencies had laid off about 4,000 employees due to the shutdown.; President Trump announces on Truth Social that he would impose a 100% tariff on Chinese goods beginning on November 1.	First Lady Melania Trump delivers a speech in front of the Blue Room
Saturday October 11	About 700 employees are reinstated at the Department of Health and Human Services reportedly after they were fired in error.; President Trump directs Secretary of Defense Pete Hegseth to use all available funds to pay the US military during the shutdown in a Truth Social post.; The US Court of Appeals for the 7th Circuit rules that President Trump cannot deploy the National Guard to Illinois.; In a Truth Social post, President Trump displays a rendering of a potential triumphal arch to be built in the capitol opposite the Lincoln Memorial.	
Sunday October 12	Vice President Vance indicates that President Trump was seriously considering invoking the Insurrection Act due to reportedly out of control crime in U.S cities.; Through a Truth Social post, President Trump falsely alleges that former president Joe Biden had placed FBI agents in the crowd of the January 6th Capitol attack.; President Trump announces Dan Scavino as Head of Personnel.	
Monday October 13	President Trump addresses the Israeli Knesset and pledges support to Israel as the Gaza Peace Plan begins.; President Trump attends the Gaza peace summit.; Andrew Giuliani, director of the FIFA World Cup 2026 Task Force, announces a drone security system for the 2028 Olympics and the 250th anniversary of the US.	President Trump delivers remarks to the Knesset. President Trump delivers remarks to world leaders. President Trump participates in a Middle East peace ceremony.
Tuesday October 14	President Trump holds a bilateral meeting with Argentine president Javier Milei at the White House.; President Trump posthumously awards Charlie Kirk the Presidential Medal of Freedom.; Defense Secretary Pete Hegseth issues new rules for press outlets and demands that the outlets pledge to agree or turn in their press badges. Per the new policy, outlets cannot use or obtain any unauthorized material even if it is unclassified.; Former national security adviser John Bolton is indicted by a federal grand jury, and is the third critic of President Trump facing criminal charges in a few weeks.	President Donald Trump posthumously awards Charlie Kirk the Presidential Medal of Freedom.
Wednesday October 15	After the issuing of new press rules from Defense Secretary Pete Hegseth, all press outlets, excluding OANN, reject to agree to the new rules and turn in their press badges.; Vice President Vance dismisses concerns about racist, homophobic and violent messages sent in recently leaked young Republican group chats stating that it was "what kids do" and that he did not want to ruin lives over it.; A federal judge issues a restraining order against the Trump administration to stop them from firing workers during the ongoing shutdown.; The US State Department announces it has revoked six visas of foreign citizens who criticized assassinated right-wing activist Charlie Kirk.	
Thursday October 16	President Trump speaks with Russian president Vladimir Putin over the phone.; US Chamber of Commerce sues the Trump administration over new fee added to H-1B worker visas, as the fee infringes on the Immigration and Nationality Act.; At least three labor unions sue the Trump administration in connection with the searching of visa holder's social media.	
Friday October 17	President Trump holds a bilateral meeting with Ukrainian president Volodymyr Zelenskyy at the White House.; In an agreement between the US Department of Education and the American Federation of Teachers union, it is announced that loan forgiveness for eligible borrowers would be offered.; Secretary of Defense Pete Hegseth announces a US strike on an alleged drug-carrying vessel, killing three people.; Prices for health insurance under the Affordable Care Act surge in a dozen states as Congress continues to debate over whether to extend subsidies.; Federal prosecutor Elizabeth Yusi is fired for refusing to charge Letitia James with mortgage fraud.; Trump commutes the sentence and orders the release of convicted GOP lawmaker and Trump ally George Santos, who has only served less than three months of his seven year prison sentence for fraud and identity theft.	President Trump participates in a bilateral Lunch with Ukrainian president Volodymyr Zelenskyy.
Saturday October 18	Approximately 2,700 No Kings protests draw nearly 7 million attendees demonstrating against Trump administration. The estimated numbers make this one of the largest single-day protests in American history.; In response to the protests, President Trump posts an AI video of him in a fighter jet dropping fecal matter on protestors.; Vice President Vance delivers remarks at the 250th Anniversary for the United States Marine Corps in Camp Pendleton, CA. During the ceremony, live ammunition is fired and explodes over Interstate-5 with shrapnel hitting police vehicles.	Thousands protest in Downtown Minneapolis on Saturday October 18, 2025 as part of nationwide “No Kings!” protest.
Sunday October 19	President Trump announces that the United States will decrease aid to Colombia and enact tariffs if it does not stop drug production.	
Monday October 20	Demolition of the East Wing's facade begins to make room for the White House State Ballroom despite not yet having approval from the National Capital Planning Commission which approves construction work in Washington D.C. government buildings.; President Trump holds a bilateral meeting with Australian prime minister Anthony Albanese at the White House, resulting in a critical minerals deal between the two countries.; The US Court of Appeals for the 9th Circuit rules that President Trump is able to deploy the National Guard to Portland.	Three excavators demolish the East Wing of the White House. President Trump participates in a bilateral lunch with Australian prime minister Anthony Albanese
Tuesday October 21	Vice President Vance and Second Lady Usha Vance visit Israel in effort to strengthen the Gaza Peace Plan and ceasefire.; Paul Ingrassia, withdraws from consideration to lead the Office of Special Counsel after racist and offensive text messages are made public. Ingrassia had been nominated by President Trump.; The state of Arizona sues Republican House Speaker Mike Johnson to force him to swear in Reprentative-elect Adelita Grijalva. Grijalva had been elected on September 23, and has yet to be sworn in.; President Trump is questioned in the Oval Office about his newly reported demand to receive $230 million in damages from the Justice Department over investigations into his 2016 campaign ties with Russia and the 2022 search of Mar-a-Largo for classified documents.	
Wednesday October 22	Secretary of Defense Pete Hegseth announces a strike on a suspected drug smuggling vessel in the Pacific Ocean, killing three people. The administration now says it has killed 83 in the Caribbean Sea and eastern Pacific Ocean since early September.; Sanctions against two major Russian oil companies are announced by the US Treasury and the European Union.; Author Michael Wolfe sues First Lady Melania Trump alleging she threatened him with legal action in an effort to stop him from writing about her alleged ties with Jeffrey Epstein.	
Thursday October 23	President Trump announces that he would not move forward with deploying federal troops to San Francisco.; The Trump administration announces a plan to allow oil and gas drilling in Alaska's Arctic National Wildlife Refuge.	
Friday October 24	The Department of Agriculture announces that it will not utilize its contingency fund to cover food stamp benefits in the event of a government shutdown.	
Saturday October 25	President Trump falsely suggests on Truth Social that Canada used AI for a television ad that used audio from a 1987 address of President Ronald Reagan denouncing tariffs. The Ronald Reagan Presidential Foundation and Institute later recommends everyone watch the full unedited address on the Ronald Reagan Presidential Library YouTube account.; Vice President Vance visits the Church of the Holy Sepulchre in Jerusalem.; Vice President Vance tweets against NYC mayoral candidate Zohran Mamdani after Mamdani spoke about Islamophobia after the attacks of 9/11.	The official statement on the matter by The Ronald Reagan Presidential Foundation and Institute. Vice President Vance visits the Church of the Holy Sepulchre in Israel.
Sunday October 26	President Trump arrives in Kuala Lumpur, Malaysia.; President Trump attends the 2025 ASEAN summit hosted by Malaysian prime minister Anwar Ibrahim.; President Trump holds a bilateral meeting with Malaysian prime minister Anwar Ibrahim.; President Trump holds a bilateral meeting with Brazilian president Luiz Inácio Lula da Silva.; President Trump participates in the signing ceremony of a Kuala Lumpur Peace Accord with Cambodian prime minister Hun Manet and Thai prime minister Anutin Charnvirakul.; The Department of Agriculture announces it would not distribute SNAP benefits for November 2025 due to the ongoing shutdown.	ASEAN leaders at the 2025 ASEAN summit President Trump participates in signing a peace accord between Cambodia and Thailand
Monday October 27	President Trump states that he had ruled out running as a vice presidential candidate for 2028, but had not ruled out trying to run for a third term as president.; President Trump announces that he had an MRI and cognitive test during his secondary physical, stating both went perfectly. If true, this would be Trump's second cognitive test in seven months.; President Trump arrives in Tokyo, Japan and meets with Emperor Naruhito at the Tokyo Imperial Palace.; The Trump administration restores a statue of the Confederate general Albert Pike that was pulled down and vandalized during Black Lives Matter protests in 2020.; The United States carries out three strikes on four suspected drug trafficking vessels in the Pacific ocean killing fourteen and wounding one.	President Trump and Emperor Naruhito at the Tokyo Imperial Palace
Tuesday October 28	President Trump holds a bilateral meeting with Japanese prime minister Sanae Takaichi at the Akasaka Palace.; Over two dozen states sue the Trump administration over the recent refusal to fund SNAP benefits during the ongoing shutdown.; While speaking at the United Nations the US Ambassador Mike Waltz is interrupted by Cuban foreign minister Bruno Rodriguez who called Waltz's remarks as "uncivilized" and referenced the Signal chat leaks.	President Trump participates in a greeting with Japanese prime minister Sanae Takaichi President Trump and Japanese prime minister Sanae Takaichi meet with families of victims kidnapped by North Korea. President Trump participates in an extended bilateral meeting with Japanese prime minister Sanae Takaichi President Trump and Japanese prime minister Sanae Takaichi participate in a troop visit and remarks on the USS George Washington.
Wednesday October 29	President Trump states that he had ruled out trying to run for a third term as president in 2028.; President Trump arrives in Gyeongju, South Korea and meets with President Lee Jae Myung, after which the two announced a trade deal.; President Trump is awarded the Grand Order of Mugunghwa, the first U.S. president to ever receive this award.; President Trump fires all members of the independent Commission of Fine Arts.; Vice President Vance and Erika Kirk speak at a Turning Point USA rally at University of Mississippi.; HHS Secretary Robert F. Kennedy Jr. states that Tylenol use in pregnancy does not appear to cause autism. Kennedy had previously stated during a press conference that it did.; Democratic congressional candidate Kat Abughazaleh and five others are indicted for allegedly blocking a vehicle during an anti-ICE protest outside the Broadview ICE Facility.	President Trump arrives in South Korea. President Trump being awarded the Grand Order of Mugunghwa. President Trump participates in an extended bilateral meeting with South Korean president Lee Jae Myung. President Trump participates in a dinner hosted by President Lee Jae Myung.
Thursday October 30	President Trump holds a bilateral meeting with Chinese leader Xi Jinping.; The nomination hearing for President Trump's nominee for surgeon general, Casey Means, is rescheduled after Means went into labor.; President Trump and First Lady Melania Trump participate in the White House Halloween event.; The Trump administration fires nearly a dozen officials in Fannie Mae’s ethics and internal investigations unit who had been investigating whether Bill Pulte and others were improperly pulling mortgage records of Democrats.; The White House announces it is limiting admissions of refugees to 7,500 for the fiscal year, the lowest number ever in the history of the United States Refugee Admissions Program. The administration also says it will prioritize and fast track admissions for white South Africans.	President Trump and Chinese leader Xi Jinping Vice President Vance gaggles with the press President Trump and First Lady Melania Trump greet trick-or-treaters during the White House Halloween event
Friday October 31	President Trump calls on Republicans to get rid of the filibuster rule requiring 60 members to approve legislation, in an effort to end the government shutdown.; A federal judge orders the Trump administration to distribute SNAP benefit funds.; President Trump announces his remodel of the bathroom in the Lincoln Bedroom in the White House on Truth Social.; In the middle of a government shutdown, President Trump hosts a Halloween party at Mar-A-Lago themed around "The Great Gatsby" and "A Little Party Never Killed Nobody", causing criticism and discourse.; While speaking at a press conference, Secretary of Agriculture Brooke Rollins states that the government had failed SNAP recipients. House Speaker Mike Johnson quickly took the microphone and blamed Democrats.; The head of the FBI's critical incident response group is fired after backlash from director Kash Patel's use of a government jet to watch his girlfriend sing at a wrestling tournament.	

=== November 2025 ===
Date	Events	Photos/videos
Saturday November 1	Secretary of Defense Pete Hegseth announces that the US military carried out a strike on alleged drug smugglers in the Caribbean Sea killing 3 people.	
Sunday November 2	Secretary of Defense Pete Hegseth issues a broad list of topics that members of the Defense Department are now required to seek prior approval before speaking to Congress about, such as any "sensitive military operations" and US military strikes on suspected drug vessels.; During an interview with CNN's State of the Union. Treasury Secretary Scott Bessent announces that the Trump administration would not appeal the SNAP court decisions and benefits could start up again as soon as Nov 5.; During a 60 Minutes interview, President Trump speaks on a variety of different topics including targeting drug smuggling vessels, Venezuela and nuclear testing by other countries.	
Monday November 3	Two advocacy groups files a lawsuit against the Trump administration and the new rule to limit the Public Service Loan Forgiveness program.; IRS official Cynthia Noe tells state comptrollers that participate in the IRS Direct File program that it would not be available in the 2026 filing season.	
Tuesday November 4	In a blue wave election, democrats sweep several districts with historical firsts, including electing the first woman in several prominent positions, as well as Zohran Mamdani, the first Muslim mayor of New York.; In a Truth Social post, President Trump falsely claims that voting for California Proposition 50 for redistricting was rigged and unconstitutional.; It was announced that Oregon and 11 other states are suing the Trump administration and the Department of Homeland Security due to withheld funding from the Emergency Management Performance Grant and the Homeland Security Grant Programs.; A federal judge rules that the Department of Transportation "blatantly overstepped" their authority by withholding billions of dollars of funding for states who refused to cooperate with federal immigration authorities.	
Wednesday November 5	The ongoing government shutdown enters its 36th day and officially became the longest in American history.; After a court directive, the USDA announces that SNAP benefits would be issued for November 2025 but beneficiaries of the program would only receive up to 65% of their benefits.	
Thursday November 6	President Trump announces deal with Eli Lilly and Novo Nordisk in regards to prices of GLP-1 drugs on Medicare and Medicaid and offer the drugs via the TrumpRX website.; Maryland Attorney General Anthony Brown announces a lawsuit against the Trump administration after plans to move the FBI headquarters to Greenbelt, MD were scrapped.; The Supreme Court agrees to freeze a lower courts injunction that would have stopped the State Department from enforcing an updated policy to end the use of the X marker on passports and required documents to reflect the holders "biological sex at birth".; A jury finds Sean Dunn, who threw a turkey sandwich at border patrol agent in DC, not guilty of misdemeanor assault charges.	
Friday November 7	DHS secretary Kristi Noem and Corey Lewandowski reportedly attempt to purchase 10 Boeing 737 aircraft from Spirit airlines for deportations and personal use.; It is reported that DoD secretary Pete Hegseth has fired or sidelined at least two dozen generals and admirals since Trump took office with little explanation.; DoD secretary Pete Hegseth announces the replacement of the Pentagons chain of command for the acquisition system.; A DHS spokesperson issues a statement attacking Olivia Rodrigo after the singer objected the use of her song in a social media post promoting self-deportation.	
Saturday November 8	President Trump shares an image on Truth Social appearing to propose the length of mortgages to 50 years, causing criticism and discussions.	
Sunday November 9	President Trump claims in a post on Truth Social that every person not from high income would receive at least $2,000 in dividends from tariff revenue.; The US military targets at least two suspected drug smuggling boats in the Pacific ocean, killing six people according to Defense Secretary Hegseth.; President Trump attends a Washington Commanders game, where he is met with some cheers and many loud boos when he is shown on the stadium's screen.; Warning of an “existential threat to democracy”, Reagan-appointed federal judge Mark L. Wolf announces his resignation from the bench, saying he is doing so in order to speak out against the Trump administration's misuse of the law for "partisan purposes".	
Monday November 10	Trump grants largely symbolic pardons to Rudy Giuliani, John Eastman, Mark Meadows, Boris Epshteyn, Sidney Powell and others involved in his attempt to overturn the 2020 election.; President Trump holds a bilateral meetings with Syrian president Ahmed al-Sharaa at the White House.; Vice President Vance and Second Lady Usha Vance visit service members and veterans at the Walter Reed Medical Center.; President Trump and Defense Secretary Hegseth attend an NFL game, and were received with mixed responses, from cheering to boos.; For the first time in three decades, the United States did not attend the COP30 conference, held in Brazil for 2025.	President Trump met with Syrian president Ahmed al-Sharaa in the Oval Office.
Tuesday November 11	President Trump performs a wreath-laying ceremony at the Tomb of the Unknown Soldier at the Arlington National Cemetery and delivers the Veterans Day address at the Memorial Amphitheater.	President Trump lays the wreath at the Tomb of the Unknown Soldier
Wednesday November 12	Private emails from Jeffrey Epstein referencing President Trump and his conduct with Epstein, Ghislaine Maxwell and victims are published by House Democrats. In one, Epstein wrote “I want you to realize that that dog that hasn’t barked is Trump.” In another, Epstein asserts that President Trump “knew about the girls.”; The government shutdown ends after President Trump signs the budget bill into law, marking the end of the longest shutdown in American history.; Representative Adelita Grijalva is the final signature on a discharge petition to demand the US Department of Justice release all files into the investigation of Jeffrey Epstein.; The US Mint strikes the last penny for circulation following a directive from President Trump.; Israeli president Isaac Herzog receives a letter from President Trump urging him to "fully pardon" Israeli prime minister Benjamin Netanyahu from his ongoing criminal cases.; The United States Conference of Catholic Bishops voted overwhelmingly to issue a condemnation of the Trump administration's "indiscriminate mass deportation" policies. "We feel compelled now in this environment to raise our voices in defense of God-given human dignity," the statement reads, in part.	Email between Ghislaine Maxwell and Jeffrey Epstein referencing President Trump released in November 2025. President Trump signs the Senate amendment ending the government shutdown. Vice President Vance & Secretary Kennedy deliver remarks at the Make America Healthy Again Summit.
Thursday November 13	The IRS releases updated rules for tax filers 401k contribution limit for the 2026 tax year.; The US Department of Justice filed a complaint against California Proposition 50 in an effort to block the new gerrymandered maps.; The Department of Housing & Urban Development releases policy funding changes and funding cuts for people experiencing homelessness.; The US State Department announces that four European self-described anti-fascist groups as Foreign Terrorist Organizations.; Transgender service members sue the Trump administration alleging forced separation without retirement benefits.; Agriculture Secretary Brooke Rollins raises claims of SNAP benefit fraud and announced that all recipients would have to reapply so that they could be vetted.; First Lady Melania Trump spearheads a new program President Trump created, called 'Fostering the Future' to develop opportunities for foster youth.	President Trump signs the Fostering the Future executive order.
Friday November 14	The United States and South Korea releases a joint statement outlining a trade agreement in shipbuilding and industrial sectors.; Attorney General Pam Bondi announces an investigation into Jeffrey Epstein's ties with President Trump's political foes.; President Trump distances himself from former ally Representative Marjorie Taylor Greene, and called her a lunatic on Truth Social, after she backed the releasing of the Epstein files.; Propublica reported that a firm tied to DHS Chief Kristi Noem was paid $200 million in DHS ad contracts during the government shutdown.; President Trump signs an executive order exempting certain foods like coffee, beef and bananas, from his reciprocal tariff policies.	
Saturday November 15	After released personal emails of Jeffrey Epstein caused speculation that President Trump and former president Bill Clinton once engaged in oral sex, Epstein's brother Mark issues a statement that the exchange was a joke and not about Clinton.; The US military conducts a strike on a supposed drug smuggling boat killing three people.; Secretary of Defense Pete Hegseth announced Operation Southern Spear, an expansion of an operation announced by the US Navy in January 2025.	Email between Mark Epstein and Jeffrey Epstein speculating that President Trump and former President Bill Clinton once engaged in oral sex, dated March 2018.
Sunday November 16	While speaking on Fox News Treasury, Secretary Scott Bessent raises doubt of ability to issue President Trump's announced tariff rebate checks.; President Trump posts support of House Republicans posting the Epstein files on Truth Social after months of opposition.	
Monday November 17	A federal judge orders prosecutors to turn over records of secret grand jury proceedings to defense attorney's for James Comey and raised concerns of "government misconduct" that may have tainted the case.; The acting FEMA Administrator David Richardson announces his resignation.; President Trump releases more than 4,600 pages of documents regarding Amelia Earhart through the National Archives.; President Trump announces the approval of the sale of F-35 fighter jets to Saudi Arabia.; Institute of International Education statistics show decline in new international student enrollment in US institutions due to VISA application changes and immigration crackdowns.; A FBI spokesperson confirms the girlfriend of FBI director Kash Patel had a protective detail of FBI SWAT team members due to reported threats against her.; The DOJ sues California over two laws requiring federal agent to identify themselves and ban them from wearing face coverings, arguing the laws violate the Constitutions Supremacy Clause.	
Tuesday November 18	President Trump meets with Crown Prince Mohammad bin Salman of Saudi Arabia in the Oval Office, dismissing U.S. intelligence findings that Salman had some culpability in the killing of journalist Jamal Khashoggi.; The UN Security Council endorses the Gaza Peace Plan that had been put forwarded by President Trump.; The House of Representatives votes 427–1 to approve a bill demanding that the Justice Department release all files related to Jeffrey Epstein. Clay Higgins (R-LA-3) was the sole representative to vote against the bill.; After being asked by an ABC News reporter about the Epstein files, President Trump calls for the ABC broadcasting license to be revoked.; A federal judge rules that the new gerrymandered Texas map could not be used in the 2026 election and must revert to its 2021 boundaries.; Border Czar Tom Homan announces plans to ramp up immigration raids in New York City.; The Department of Education announces the outsourcing of the departments operations with other agencies.; The House of Representatives holds a hearing on AI chatbots and concerns about a potential AI bubble in the US economy.; President Trump hosts a formal dinner for Crown Prince Mohammad bin Salman.	President Trump participates in a colonnade walk with Crown Prince Mohammad bin Salman of Saudi Arabia at the White House. President Trump meets with Crown Prince Mohammad bin Salman of Saudi Arabia in the Oval Office. The House of Representatives votes 427-1 to approve a bill demanding that the Justice Department release all files related to Jeffrey Epstein.
Wednesday November 19	The Senate unanimously passes the Epstein Files Transparency Act and, despite months spent preventing its passage, Trump signs it into law.; First Lady Melania Trump and Second Lady Usha Vance make their first joint visit to Marine Corps Base Camp Lejeune to spend time with military members and their families to show appreciation for those who serve during the holiday season.; The House of Representatives unanimously passes a measure repealing language in the government funding bill allowing senators to sue the government over phone investigations.	First Lady Melania Trump & Second Lady Usha Vance at Marine Corps Base Camp Lejeune
Thursday November 20	President Trump reportedly approves a 28-point plan to end the Russo-Ukrainian war. Ukraine has not backed the plan so far.; US Congress calls for eSafety commissioner Julie Inman Grant to testify over concerns that her enforcement of Australia's Online Safety Act curbs US free speech.; Former vice president Dick Cheney's funeral is held at Washington National Cathedral. Both President Trump and Vice President Vance were not invited to the funeral.; President Trump posts to Truth Social calling for Democratic lawmakers to be arrested and put on trial after making a video urging US service members & the intelligence community to refrain from orders if they broke the law.; The Trump administration announces plans to allow for offshore oil and gas leasing, opening up almost all of the Alaska marine waters, the entire Pacific coast and the Gulf of Mexico to development.	
Friday November 21	President Trump meets with New York City Mayor-elect Zohran Mamdani at the White House. Trump praised Mamdani, saying “I think this mayor can do some things that are going to be really great."; Supreme Court Justice Samuel Alito issues a stay in the Texas gerrymandering case, suspending the ruling by a panel of judges which held it unconstitutional.; Representative Marjorie Taylor Greene announces she will resign from her office in January 2026.; US District Court of Rhode Island struck down the Trump administrations attempts to dismantle the Institute of Museum and Library Services.; The Trump administration pulls funding for Szabad Europa the Hungarian language service of Radio Free Europe after it printed opposition to Hungarian prime minister Viktor Orban.	President Trump Meets with Zohran Mamdani, Mayor-Elect, New York City.
Saturday November 22	DHS Secretary Kristi Noem announces that investment of $1 billion in airport security checkpoints, including X-ray and physical technology.; The US Court of Appeals for the DC circuit rules to put a hold on a ruling by a lower judge and blocked the DHS from enforcing policies that exposed migrants to the risk of rapid deportations.	President Trump gaggles with the press before departing the White House.
Sunday November 23	It is announced that the Department of Government Efficiency (DOGE) had been dissolved with eight months remaining in its contract.	
Monday November 24	A judge dismisses the indictments of both the prosecution of Letitia James and prosecution of James Comey because former Trump personal attorney Lindsey Halligan was not lawfully appointed when she brought the charges.; The Trump administration designats Venezuelan president Nicolás Maduro and his government allies as members of a foreign terrorist organization.; First Lady Melania Trump welcomes the arrival of the 2025 White House Christmas tree.; President Trump speaks with Chinese leader Xi Jinping over the phone about the countries relationship.; The Department of Interior announces new rules for the Endangered Species Act to restore the 2019 and 2020 framework of the act.; The DoD announces a "thorough review" into Senator Mark Kelly claiming allegations of misconduct after Kelly participated in a video telling US service members they could refuse illegal orders.	Melania Trump receives the 2025 White House Christmas Tree
Tuesday November 25	President Trump and First Lady Melania Trump participate in the National Thanksgiving Turkey Presentation for the first time in the second term. Trump brags about his accomplishments, insults his political enemies, and jokes about sending the turkeys to a prison in El Salvador.; The Department of Interior announces an entrance fee increase for all international visitors to national parks, commemorative passes featuring Trump, and citizen-only days including Trump's birthday starting in 2026.; A New York Times investigation shows that the Trump administration made several false claims in a filing asking the Supreme Court to allow deployment of National Guard troops to Chicago.	President Trump and First Lady Melania Trump pardon a turkey named "Gobble"
Wednesday November 26	Fulton County Superior Court Judge dismisses a racketeering case against President Trump over his efforts to overturn his loss in Georgia during the 2020 election.; A leaked phone call recording reportedly had President Trump's Ukraine special envoy Steve Witkoff coaching a Kremlin official on how to approach peace in the Ukraine Russia war and how to speak with Trump. The call's contents cause US political outrage.; The White House is placed on lockdown after two National Guard members from West Virginia were shot and seriously injured near the White House in downtown DC. President Trump was not in residence and was at Mar-a-Largo for Thanksgiving.; Democratic attorney generals from 21 states and from DC sues the Trump administration over guidance for SNAP, which they say unlawfully blocks certain legal immigrants from access food aid.; The Supreme Court issues a stay on the Trump administrations firing of the director of the US Copyright Office, while they ruled on two other high-profile firing cases.; The Trump administration announces that the United States government would no longer commemorate World AIDS Day.; Vice President Vance and Second Lady Usha Vance serve a Thanksgiving meal to troops at Fort Campbell.; Trump announces that South Africa will not be invited to attend the 2026 G20 Miami summit, citing a false conspiracy theory about white South Africans.	President Trump addresses the Washington, D.C. National Guard shooting
Thursday November 27	In what he referred to as a "Thanksgiving salutation", President Trump posts a series of anti-immigration messages and used a dated slur for intellectually disabled people to demean Governor Tim Walz.	
Friday November 28	First Lady Melania Trump launches her own production company Muse Films.; In the wake of the National Guard shooting two days prior, the director of US Citizenship & Immigration Services, Joseph Edlow announces the pause of all asylum decisions.; Northwestern University agrees to pay $75 million to the US government in a deal with the Trump administration to end investigations and restore about $790 million in grants, over allegations of not fighting antisemitism enough.; The Washington Post reports that DoD secretary Pete Hegseth ordered military personnel to leave no survivors during a Sept 2 strike on an alleged drug smuggling boat. In order to comply with Hegseth's directive, the commander overseeing the attack ordered a second strike to kill two survivors clinging to a smoldering wreck – an act that military lawyers and some lawmakers say is a war crime.; President Trump states on Truth Social that he is cancelling all Executive Orders and anything else that was not directly signed by former president Joe Biden. Trump falsely claims that anything signed by an autopen was illegal, although the Justice Department has stated it is legal.	
Saturday November 29	Trump says that the airspace above and around Venezuela should be considered "closed in its entirety," but gives no further details.	
Sunday November 30	President Trump announces via Truth Social that he would pardon former Honduran president Juan Orlando Hernandez, who recently was given a 45 year prison sentence for participating in a multi-decade drug trafficking conspiracy.; President Trump confirms that he and Venezuelan president Nicolas Maduro spoke via telephone earlier in the month.	

=== December 2025 ===
Date	Events	Photos/videos
Monday December 1	The US Court of Appeals for the 3rd Circuit upholds a lower court ruling disqualifying Alina Habba as the acting US attorney in New Jersey. Habba had been a personal lawyer for President Trump, and her position challenged under the Federal Vacancies Reform act.; First Lady Melania Trump unveils the Christmas decorations at the White House for the first time during this second term.; The White House releases details of the MRI that President Trump received during his second examination in early October 2025 at the Walter Reed Medical Center.; White House press secretary Karoline Leavitt confirms that DoD secretary Pete Hegseth had authorized a follow up second strike on an alleged drug boat in the Caribbean in September 2025. The second strike was ordered after two apparent survivors were identified in the wreckage.; DHS secretary Kristi Noem tweets that she was recommending a full travel ban on multiple unspecified countries that she claimed were "flooding our nation with killers, leeches, and entitlement junkies".; The US Department of Commerce announces that they will take a stake of up to $150 million in xLight, a start up company to develop free-electron lasers for computer chips.; Costco Wholesale sues the Trump administration through the Court of International Trade, claiming all tariffs collected under the International Emergency Economic Powers Act are unlawful.; Per an official with the National Association of Immigration Judges, the Trump administration fires eight immigration judges in New York City.	2025 White House Christmas Tree
Tuesday December 2	President Trump holds a meeting with his cabinet, during which he defends Hegseth's attack on survivors in an alleged drug-carrying boat, calls Somali immigrants "garbage", and struggles to stay alert.; The Miami Dade College's board of trustees once again unanimously votes to transfer land for the Donald J. Trump Presidential Library to be built.	President Trump participates in a cabinet meeting.
Wednesday December 3	Surrounded by auto industry executives in the Oval Office, Trump announces a proposal to weaken vehicle mileage rules for the auto industry.	
Thursday December 4	President Trump participates in the signing ceremony of the peace agreement with Congolese president Félix Tshisekedi and Rwandan president Paul Kagame at the White House. As of September 2026, fighting continues and the peace process remains unresolved.; President Trump and First Lady Melania Trump participate in the National Christmas Tree lighting outside the White House. During his remarks, Trump repeats his false claims that the 2020 election was "rigged".; Trying again after a judge dropped charges in November, DOJ prosecutors in VA fail to obtain a second indictment of Letitia James when a grand jury declines to indict her.; The New York Times sues the Department of Defense and Pete Hegseth over their restrictive press policy.	President Trump, President Kagame of Rwanda, and President Tshisekedi of the Democratic Republic of the Congo sign peace deal. First Lady Melania Trump and President Donald Trump light the National Christmas Tree
Friday December 5	President Trump is awarded the inaugural FIFA Peace Prize by FIFA president Gianni Infantino. Trump was presented with a trophy and a medal, which he eagerly put around his own neck without waiting for Infantino to do so.; The CDC vaccine advisory panel rolls back a decades long recommendation for newborns to receive a first dose of the hepatitis B vaccine within 24 hours of birth.; First Lady Melania Trump visits children at the Children's National Hospital in Washington, D.C.	First Lady Melania Trump visits children at the Children's National Hospital in Washington, D.C.
Saturday December 6	President Trump presents the 2025 Kennedy Center Honorees with their medals in a ceremony at the Oval Office. The honorees are Michael Crawford, Gloria Gaynor, Peter Criss, Ace Frehley, Gene Simmons and Paul Stanley of the rock band Kiss, Sylvester Stallone, and George Strait.; The Trump administration removes Martin Luther King Jr. Day and Juneteenth to the list of fee-free days at the nation's national parks, and adds Trump’s birthday.	
Sunday December 7	Trump hosts the Kennedy Center Honors ceremony himself, a break with tradition as presidents typically attend, but none have ever hosted. The Nielsen ratings for the television broadcast drop to a new all-time low.; Breaking longstanding precedent of U.S. presidents not interfering with regulators reviewing corporate deals, Trump says he will "be involved" in the Netflix and Paramount bids to buy Warner Brothers Discovery.	President Trump and First Lady Melania Trump arrive at the Kennedy Center Honors.
Monday December 8	President Trump announces $12 billion in one-time payments to farmers during a White House roundtable with Treasury Secretary Scott Bessent and Agriculture Secretary Brooke Rollins.	
Tuesday December 9	A notice from Customs and Border Protection includes a proposal that new entrants from 42 countries in the VISA waiver program must submit the last five years of their social media histories in order to enter the US.; The FDA announces a safety review of two approved RSV drugs; Beyfortus and Enflonsia which are both monoclonal antibodies. Neither drug had any prior safety issues reported.; Calling it "yet another wasteful DEIA program", the State Department orders its employees to switch from using the Calibri typeface in official documents and return to using Times New Roman. The change was made during the Biden administration because studies suggested sans-serif typefaces were easier to read for people with visual disabilities.	
Wednesday December 10	President Trump announces that the US Coast Guard and Navy seized an oil tanker off the coast of Venezuela as part of Operation Southern Spear. Trump says the US will keep the oil although it is not clear whether this is legal. Venezuela calls the seizure a "barefaced robbery and an act of international piracy."; Transportation Secretary Sean Duffy announces the removal of nearly 10,000 commercial truck drivers from US roads over English fluency.; The Trump administration launches the website for the Trump Gold Card initiative that would allow foreign nationals to purchase legal status in the US for $1 million.	
Thursday December 11	DHS Secretary Kristi Noem is questioned about the hardline immigration policies and deportations before the House Committee on Homeland Security. During the hearing she is confronted with explaining the deportation of a veteran and Purple Heart recipient.; The Department of Interior announces that 760 acres of public land located in California's San Diego and Imperial counties would be militarized with armed forces. This would create a National Defense Area in part to support ongoing border security operations.; President Trump signs an executive order directing the Justice Department to set up an AI Litigation Task Force to sue states over state AI laws. Additionally it tasked the Federal Trade Commission, DOJ, and Federal Communications Commission to circumvent any additional state or local regulations.; The Indiana Senate rejects a Trump-backed proposal to redraw the congressional districts in Indiana in a 31-19 vote, with 21 state Republicans joining all 10 Democrats in voting against the proposal.; Following a failure to re-indict Letitia James on Dec 4, a second federal grand jury in VA declines to indict her.	
Friday December 12	Democrats on the House Oversight Committee releases photos from Jeffrey Epstein estate showing figures such as President Trump, former president Bill Clinton, Steve Bannon, Bill Gates, Richard Branson, Andrew Mountbatten-Windsor and others.; A federal judge issues a temporary restraining order that would stop the Trump administration from re-detaining Kilmar Abrego Garcia after he was released from custody the day before.; President Trump is sued by the National Trust for Historic Preservation over the razing of the East Wing of the White House and blocking the ballroom construction until certain reviews are met.; DHS announces the termination of the Family Reunification Parole programs, which allowed immigrants of specific countries to enter the US temporarily.; Oregon and a coalition of 18 other Democratic states sues the Trump administration over the addition of a $100,000 fee on H-1B VISAs.	
Saturday December 13	President Trump takes part in the coin toss for his first Army–Navy Game as commander-in-chief in this second term. Trump receives criticism online for placing the coin in his palm and throwing it into the air without any rotation.; President Trump addresses the shooting at Brown University that occurred earlier that day.	President Trump participates in the Army–Navy Game. President Trump gaggles with the press and addresses the Brown University shooting.
Sunday December 14	A New York Times investigation shows that since Trump took office, the Securities and Exchange Commission paused litigation, reduced penalties, or dropped lawsuits against 60 percent of the cases against cryptocurrency firms, and has dropped every case against firms with ties to the Trump family.	
Monday December 15	In response to the Killing of Rob and Michele Reiner, Trump posts that the motive for the killing was "reportedly due to the anger he caused others through his massive, unyielding, and incurable affliction with a mind crippling disease known as TRUMP DERANGEMENT SYNDROME, sometimes referred to as TDS.” The post drew immediate backlash from all sides of the political spectrum.; President Trump signs an executive order classifying "illicit fentanyl and its core precursor chemicals" as weapons of mass destruction.; The US military attacks three boats suspected of drug smuggling, killing eight people.	
Tuesday December 16	President Trump expands the list of countries included in travel restrictions with an additional 20 countries and the Palestinian Authority. Five countries and the Palestinian Authority were included as a full ban on travel, with new limits on 15 other countries.; Vice President Vance visits Alburtis, Pennsylvania and speaks to supporters about keeping jobs in the United States, cost of living concerns, and the economy.	Vice President Vance delivers remarks in Alburtis, Pennsylvania.
Wednesday December 17	President Trump addresses the nation in a scheduled twenty-minute primetime TV speech from the White House in which he airs familiar grievances, makes several false claims, and announces a $1,776 one-time basic allowance for housing supplement to roughly 1.45 million eligible military members in pay grades O-6 and below.; Plaques are added to President Trump's Presidential Walk of Fame describing previous presidents with partisan language aligning with President Trump's former comments.	President Trump addresses the nation.
Thursday December 18	The board of the John F Kennedy Center votes to change the name to the Trump-Kennedy Center. Democratic board members allege that they were muted and not allowed to voice opposition on the change.; President Trump signs executive order that expedites the reclassification of cannabis from Schedule I to a Schedule III drug.; President Trump announces the Patriot Games, a sporting event to be held during the United States Semiquincentennial. The Games will feature one male and one female high school athlete from every state and territory.; A Miami judge dismisses a complaint against the transfer of land from Miami Dade College, clearing the way for the Donald J. Trump Presidential Library to be built.	
Friday December 19	Though the Epstein Files Transparency Act mandated that all the files were to be released today, DOJ releases only 3,965 files, some with substantial redactions made without explanation.; Workers add Trump's name on the building formerly known as the Kennedy Center, and now known as "The Donald J. Trump and The John F. Kennedy Memorial Center for the Performing Arts.	A sign altered in December 2025 marks “The Donald J. Trump and The [sic] John F. Kennedy Memorial Center for the Performing Arts”
Saturday December 20	Jesse Waters tells a crowd at a Turning Point USA event that, during a conversation about the White House Ballroom, Trump told him "Jesse, it's a monument. I'm building a monument to myself — because no one else will."	
Sunday December 21	Attorney General Pam Bondi was threatened with inherent contempt by some law makers after the release of Epstein files was deemed incomplete and redacted too heavily.; Just hours prior to airing, CBS News's new editor-in-chief Bari Weiss cancels a 60 Minutes expose of El Salvador's Terrorism Confinement Center (CECOT) used to confine Venezuelan migrants who had been deported by the Trump administration. The cancellation is met with backlash from journalists, progressive groups, and public officials, who deemed the cancellation unjustified, and to have been carried out at the behest of the Trump administration.	
Monday December 22	The US Department of the Interior suspends five offshore wind leases over what it said were "national security concerns".; During a speech at Turning Point USA's annual convention, Vice President Vance refuses to denounce Nick Fuentes and says the U.S. "always will be a Christian nation."; ProPublica reports that Todd Blanche was holding between $159,000 and $485,000 worth of cryptocurrency assets when he ordered an end to investigations into crypto companies. Legal experts say the move violates conflicts of interest law and his ethics agreement.; An NPR investigation shows that the Trump administration is punishing 37 prisoners spared the death penalty by the Biden administration by making their life sentences as harsh as possible, in ways that may be unconstitutional.	
Tuesday December 23	A newly released batch of Epstein files reveals two subpoenas sent to Mar-a-Lago and an email from a federal prosecutor altering the redacted recipient that Trump had flown on Mr. Epstein’s private jet "many more times than previously has been reported."; Internal emails reviewed by the Washington Post reveal that ICE’s public affairs division worked closely with the White House to intentionally make videos of immigrant arrests and confrontations go viral.; A New York Times analysis shows that many of DOGE's biggest claims are inaccurate, detailing accounting tricks, the same cuts claimed twice, and credit claimed for programs cut under the Biden administration.The analysis concludes that DOGE's very large disruptions saved the government very little.	
Wednesday December 24		
Thursday December 25	Democratic Representative and member of the Kennedy Center board Joyce Beatty files a lawsuit to attempt to remove President Trump's name from the Kennedy Center.	
Friday December 26		
Saturday December 27		
Sunday December 28	President Trump holds a bilateral meeting and joint press conference with Ukrainian president Zelenskyy at Mar-a-Lago.	President Trump greets Ukrainian president Zelenskyy at Mar-a-Lago. President Trump holds a bilateral meeting with Ukrainian president Zelenskyy. President Trump holds a joint press conference with Ukrainian president Zelenskyy.
Monday December 29	President Trump holds a bilateral meeting and joint press conference with Israeli prime minister Benjamin Netanyahu at Mar-a-Lago.	President Trump greets Israeli prime minister Benjamin Netanyahu at Mar-a-Lago. President Trump holds a bilateral meeting with Israeli prime minister Benjamin Netanyahu. President Trump holds a joint press conference with Israeli prime minister Benjamin Netanyahu.
Tuesday December 30		
Wednesday December 31		President Trump attends a New Year's Eve party.

== See also ==
- First 100 days of the second Trump presidency – Period from January to April 2025
- List of executive actions by Donald Trump
- Lists of presidential trips made by Donald Trump (international trips)
- Second presidential transition of Donald Trump – Transfer of presidential power from Joe Biden to Donald Trump
- Timeline of the 2024 United States presidential election

U.S. presidential administration timelines
Preceded by Second Trump presidency (2025 Q3)	Second Trump presidency (2025 Q4)	Succeeded by Second Trump presidency (2026 Q1)
