= Prosecution of James Comey =

2025 criminal case in Virginia, U.S.

United States v. Comey
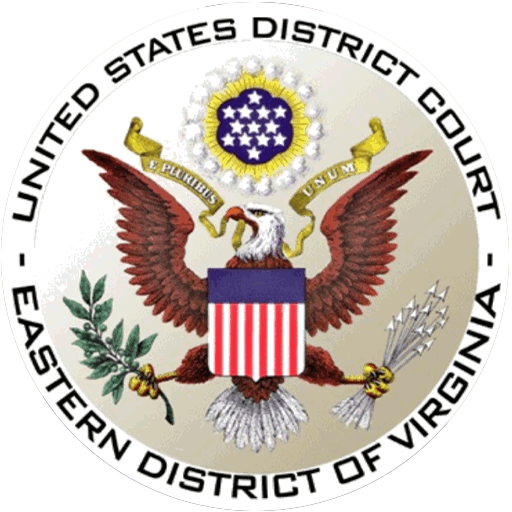
- Court: United States District Court for the Eastern District of Virginia
- Full case name: United States of America v. James B. Comey, Jr.
- Docket nos.: 1:25-cr-00272 - 25-4674

Court membership
- Judge sitting: Michael S. Nachmanoff

On September 25, 2025, James Comey, a former director of the Federal Bureau of Investigation (FBI), was indicted by a federal grand jury in Virginia on two counts: one charge of making a false statement to Congress, and one charge of obstructing a congressional proceeding. The charges are related to Comey's testimony during a September 30, 2020, Senate Judiciary Committee hearing about the FBI's investigation of links between Russia and the 2016 Trump presidential campaign, and he was indicted just before the five-year statute of limitations ran out. The indictment followed President Trump's removal of U.S. Attorney Erik Siebert, who had opposed bringing charges, and his installation of Lindsey Halligan, a political loyalist with no prosecutorial experience, who secured the indictment days before the statute of limitations expired.

Comey's defense argued the charges were baseless because Senator Ted Cruz's 2020 questions were ambiguous, Comey's answers were literally true, and the obstruction count fails to specify any false statements. They also allege grand-jury misconduct, including Halligan keeping jurors late, signing two indictments, and allowing improper testimony, framing the prosecution as vindictive and politically driven. Federal judges have sharply criticized the government's handling of the case, ordered the release of grand-jury materials, and reviewed whether Halligan's appointment itself was lawful. Comey pleaded not guilty.

A trial was scheduled for January 2026. The charges were dismissed without prejudice on November 24 after Halligan's appointment was ruled unlawful, but the Justice Department has announced that it intends to appeal the ruling. On December 9, the Justice Department referred to the legal dispute in a court filing as a "pending criminal investigation" and "a potential federal criminal prosecution", which has been suggested to indicate that the Department intends to seek a new indictment against Comey.

== Background ==
Former president Barack Obama nominated Comey to become the Director of the FBI in June 2013, and he was sworn in on September 4. Among his responsibilities was overseeing an FBI investigation into Russian interference in the 2016 presidential election, a portion of which focused on possible coordination between Russia and members of the 2016 Trump presidential campaign. Donald Trump fired Comey on May 9, 2017, and shortly after, Trump said he was motivated by the latter investigation.

Before he was fired, Comey had been writing notes to memorialize his one-on-one meetings with Trump, and after he was fired, he shared one of them with Daniel Richman, a Columbia Law School professor and friend of Comey's. After Comey was indicted, Richman shared that memo with The New York Times.

During a September 30, 2020, Senate Judiciary Committee hearing into the FBI's investigation of links between Trump associates and Russian officials, in response to questioning from U.S. Senator Ted Cruz, Comey denied having authorized anonymous leaks to The Wall Street Journal for an October 2016 article. In a December 2020 letter to the Department of Justice, Cruz wrote that former FBI official Andrew McCabe had said Comey was aware of McCabe's authorization of a leak, contradicting Comey's denials. Cruz's questioning of Comey in 2020 addressed both "the Clinton investigation" regarding her private email server, as well as "matters relating to the Trump investigation" about Russian interference.

A lengthy report was issued by prosecutor John Durham in 2023 about Russian interference in the 2016 United States elections, and Durham's report concluded that "not every injustice or transgression amounts to a criminal offense, and criminal prosecutors are tasked exclusively with investigating and prosecuting violations of U.S. criminal laws." Lawyers from the U.S. Attorney's Office in Washington, D.C. and prosecutors in Virginia "reached the same conclusion" as Durham, in the words of ABC News:

They'd be unable to prove Comey made false statements to Congress to obstruct their investigation. Presenting their findings in a lengthy declination memo, the prosecutors explicitly mentioned the two other investigations to bolster their recommendation that probable cause does not exist to charge Comey, according to sources familiar with the contents of the memo.

Based in part on discussions with Durham, those federal prosecutors working for U.S. Attorney Lindsey Halligan advised that charges should not be brought against Comey. She opted to bring three charges, and the grand jury agreed with two of them.

The five-year statute of limitations would have expired on September 30, 2025. Erik Siebert, the interim U.S. Attorney in the Eastern District of Virginia, reportedly recommended against charging Comey, and Trump then pressured him into resigning. In a Truth Social post, Trump publicly pressured Attorney General Pam Bondi to install loyalist Lindsey Halligan, his former personal attorney, in the role to push forward charges against adversaries, including Comey. Siebert resigned on September 19, 2025, and Halligan replaced him as interim U.S. Attorney on September 22.

== Feud with Donald Trump ==
The public feud between Trump and Comey stems from Comey's oversight of the FBI's investigation into possible ties between the 2016 Trump presidential campaign and Russia, his subsequent dismissal by Trump, and their escalating public animosity.

In March 2017, Comey publicly confirmed that the FBI had opened a counterintelligence investigation into whether individuals associated with the Trump campaign had coordinated with Russian operatives. Trump reacted angrily, calling the probe a "Russiagate hoax" and a "witch hunt" and demanding personal loyalty from Comey in private meetings, including urging him to drop the FBI's inquiry into National Security Adviser Michael Flynn.

Trump abruptly dismissed Comey on May 9, 2017, later citing the investigation as the reason. While the White House initially attributed the firing to Comey's handling of the Hillary Clinton email investigation, Trump later acknowledged he was thinking about "this Russia thing" when he made the decision. The dismissal led to the appointment of Robert Mueller as special counsel to investigate potential obstruction of justice by Trump.

Following his firing, Comey became an outspoken critic of Trump. His 2018 memoir A Higher Loyalty portrayed Trump as "unethical", "untethered to truth", and "like a mafia boss". Trump responded on social media and in interviews, calling Comey a "leaker", an "untruthful slimeball", and claimed Comey should face charges for "treason".

According to ABC News, Trump privately vented that Comey's daughter Maurene Comey worked in his administration. On July 16, 2025, Maurene Comey, a senior trial counsel who had worked in the U.S. attorney's office for nearly a decade, was fired from the United States District Court for the Southern District of New York without cause, the day after taking the lead on a major corruption case. On September 15, 2025, Maurene Comey filed a lawsuit against the DOJ for wrongful termination and retaliation for her familial connection.

In September 2025, Trump publicly praised the Justice Department's indictment of James Comey and suggested that additional political opponents could face prosecution. "It's not a list, but I think there will be others", Trump told reporters, while describing Comey as "a dirty cop" who "lied". He added, "For him, it was a very good answer if he didn't get caught. He got caught."

President Trump has commented publicly about the case, stating at Truth Social: "One of the worst human beings this Country has ever been exposed to is James Comey, the former Corrupt Head of the FBI", and also saying the case is about "justice not revenge." Additionally, at Truth Social, Trump has said that Comey, New York Attorney General Letitia James and U.S. Sen. Adam Schiff are "all guilty as hell, but nothing is going to get done."

A defiant Comey recorded a video on Instagram insisting he's innocent and would not be cowed by Trump:

My family and I have known for years that there are costs to standing up to Donald Trump, but we couldn't imagine ourselves living any other way. We will not live on our knees, and you shouldn't either. Somebody that I love dearly recently said that fear is the tool of a tyrant and she's right. But I'm not afraid and I hope you're not either.

== Charges ==
Lindsey Halligan, sworn in on September 22, 2025, three days later led a federal grand jury to return a two-count indictment against former FBI Director James B. Comey. The charges stem from his testimony before the Senate Judiciary Committee on September 30, 2020, during a hearing on the FBI's handling of the Crossfire Hurricane investigation.

=== Count one: False statements to Congress (18 U.S.C. § 1001(a)(2)) ===
Count One alleges that during a September 30, 2020 hearing before the Senate Judiciary Committee, Comey "willfully and knowingly" made a materially false statement when he testified that he had not authorized anyone at the FBI to serve as an anonymous source for news reporting about an FBI investigation concerning "Person 1." The indictment asserts that Comey knew the statement was false because he had, in fact, authorized another FBI official ("Person 3") to act as such a source.

Comey's attorneys argue that Cruz's question was "fundamentally ambiguous", that Cruz appeared to be asking exclusively about former Deputy Director Andrew McCabe, and that Comey's reply—"I stand by my prior testimony"—was literally true regardless of whether his earlier testimony was itself correct.

=== Count two: Obstruction of a Congressional proceeding (18 U.S.C. § 1505) ===
Count Two charges that Comey corruptly endeavored to obstruct the Senate Judiciary Committee's inquiry by making false and misleading statements during the same 2020 hearing, thereby impeding the committee's "due and proper exercise" of its investigative authority.

Comey's attorneys argue that the obstruction charge is legally defective because the indictment does not identify which statements were false or how they obstructed Congress, and they sought a bill of particulars requiring prosecutors to specify the factual basis for the allegation.

=== Nature of the indictment ===
The indictment is not a detailed "speaking indictment" and does not identify which specific statements or press reports form the basis of either charge. News reports speculated that the charges may relate to Comey's communications with Richman and to materials from the FBI's internal leak inquiry known as "Arctic Haze".

== Indictment ==
As the statute of limitations for the charges was set to expire in the leadup to the indictment, Trump pressured the interim US Attorney in the Eastern District of Virginia, Erik Siebert, who reportedly recommended against charging Comey, into resigning. Trump publicly pressured Attorney General Pam Bondi to install loyalist Lindsey Halligan, his former personal attorney, in the role to push forward charges against adversaries including Comey, in a Truth Social post on September 20. On October 8, U.S. officials told The Wall Street Journal that Trump had believed he was messaging Bondi privately when he mistakenly posted his message to Truth Social.

On September 25, 2025, Comey was indicted by a federal grand jury in Virginia on two counts: one charge of making a false statement to Congress, and one charge of obstructing a congressional proceeding. He denies the charges. A trial is set for January 5, 2026.

The 23-person grand jury voted against a third charge. The two charges are related to Comey's testimony during a Senate Judiciary Committee hearing into the FBI's investigation of links between Russia and the 2016 Trump presidential campaign on September 30, 2020; the five-year statute of limitations would have run out on September 30, 2025.

The indictment is not a speaking indictment that details the facts of the case; as CNN reports, "The indictment doesn't identify which specific leaked details or news reports form the core of the case." The indictment may refer to leaking that Comey (not McCabe) engaged in with Columbia Law School professor Daniel Richman. Professor Richman was also a "special government employee", and the government may argue that Comey's denial to Senator Cruz included denial of leaking with Richman (not just McCabe). CNN also reports that the indictment may involve the FBI's leak investigation called "Arctic Haze".

Arctic Haze was an FBI media leak investigation opened in 2017 to examine the unauthorized disclosure of classified information in news articles published between April and June 2017. The investigation examined whether Comey had authorized Richman to serve as a media conduit; according to declassified FBI memos, Richman told investigators in 2019 that his goal was to "correct stories critical of Comey and the FBI." The Arctic Haze investigation closed in 2021 without charges, concluding it "has not yielded sufficient evidence to criminally charge any person, including Comey or Richman, with making false statements or with the substantive offenses under investigation." FBI Director Kash Patel declassified the Arctic Haze records in August 2025.

U.S. District Judge Michael S. Nachmanoff has jurisdiction over the case. The lead prosecutor is U.S. Attorney Halligan, who represented the government before the grand jury and signed the indictment. Comey's defense counsel team includes Patrick Fitzgerald and Michael Dreeben.

No arrest warrant was issued. On October 3, multiple sources said that FBI agent Chris Ray was suspended or relieved of duty after refusing to arrange a perp walk for Comey in front of media. Comey was arraigned on October 8, pleaded not guilty, and was released until trial without conditions. The trial was scheduled for January 5, 2026; however, Comey's defense attorney announced plans to submit at least two motions to dismiss, including arguments for selective or vindictive prosecution and for Halligan's appointment not having been lawful.

=== Dismissal ===
On November 24, 2025, senior United States district judge Cameron McGowan Currie ruled that Halligan had not been lawfully appointed, and she dismissed without prejudice the indictments of Comey, as well as of Letitia James. Currie wrote that, when Siebert was appointed as interim U.S. attorney on January 21, this started "[t]he 120-day clock". From May 21, the Attorney General no longer had appointment authority. Therefore, when Halligan assumed her position as interim U.S. attorney on September 22, she was "unlawfully serving in that role". In mid-December, the DOJ appealed the dismissal. As Halligan's appointment had been on an interim basis anyway, it had only been set to last 120 days, and she resigned on January 20, 2026, acknowledging that her tenure had ended.

Although the Justice Department could start over with a new indictment by asking another grand jury to approve charges against Comey, this would be complicated by its inability to use the evidence it acquired from Comey's friend and former lawyer Dan Richman. On December 6, DC District Court Judge Colleen Kollar-Kotelly temporarily blocked the Justice Department's access to evidence it had collected from Richman's personal computer. The government had not had a warrant for the search, Richman sued the Justice Department claiming the search had been unconstitutional, and, were Richman's lawsuit to succeed (as Kollar-Kotelly predicted it was likely to do, based on the merits of Richman's claim), the unconstitutionally gathered evidence could not be used in a new indictment against Comey. On December 12, Kollar-Kotelly ruled that the Justice Department had violated the Fourth Amendment in continuing holding Richman's files without obtaining a new warrant, and ordered the Justice Department to return the files to Richman and give a sealed copy to the court to be used in the future only if the Justice Department were to obtain a warrant.

== Pre-trial motions ==
=== October 20, 2025, defense motions ===
On October 20, Comey's defense attorney filed two motions to dismiss, one for selective or vindictive prosecution and one challenging Halligan's appointment as unlawful. The latter motion was referred to Albert Diaz, the chief judge of the U.S. Court of Appeals for the Fourth Circuit, who assigned this part of the case to Cameron McGowan Currie, a senior judge in the U.S. District Court for the District of South Carolina; the assignment allows the motion to be heard in a district other than the one where Halligan serves as the interim U.S. Attorney.

=== October 30, 2025, defense motions ===
On October 30, 2025, Comey's legal team filed a second set of motions to dismiss the indictment, arguing that the charges were legally defective and that the grand-jury process was compromised by procedural irregularities and political interference.

==== Core arguments for dismissal ====
Comey's defense asserted that the perjury count was invalid because his 2020 congressional testimony was both literally true and based on a fundamentally ambiguous question. During the 2020 hearing, Senator Cruz's inquiry appeared to concern former FBI Deputy Director Andrew McCabe, while prosecutors now allege that Comey lied about Daniel C. Richman. The filing stated that "fundamental to any false-statement charge are both clear questions and false answers. Neither exists here."

The defense also argued that the obstruction count under 18 U.S.C. § 1505 was impermissibly vague, failing to identify which statements were false or how they obstructed Congress. The motion requested that the court compel prosecutors to file a bill of particulars providing greater detail.

==== Alleged grand-jury misconduct ====
The motions accused Halligan of serious procedural irregularities during the grand-jury proceedings, including:

- keeping jurors "well past normal business hours" after they initially declined one count,
- signing two different versions of the indictment, and
- allowing an FBI witness to share privileged attorney–client communications.

Comey's attorneys argued that Halligan, who had no prior prosecutorial experience, conducted her first grand-jury presentation without supervision, rendering the process "tainted and prejudicial".

==== Political and constitutional context ====
The filings reiterated that the prosecution was politically motivated. According to court records, President Trump ordered Pam Bondi, then attorney general, to replace U.S. Attorney Siebert—who had refused to indict Comey—and to install Halligan in his place. The motions characterized the case as a test of Justice Department independence and of the constitutional limits on presidential control of criminal prosecutions.

=== November 5, 2025, hearing ===
During a November 5, 2025, hearing in Alexandria, Virginia, U.S. Magistrate Judge William Fitzpatrick sharply criticized the Justice Department's prosecution accusing special prosecutor Lindsey Halligan of taking a "highly unusual" "indict first, investigate second" approach.

Fitzpatrick ordered prosecutors to turn over all grand-jury and investigative materials seized from Daniel Richman, a Columbia University law professor and longtime Comey confidant, after finding that the government had not shared the evidence with the defense. The seized communications originated from a prior internal FBI leak inquiry known as Arctic Haze.

Comey's legal team had argued that prosecutors' withholding of evidence, combined with irregularities in Halligan's grand-jury presentation—including keeping jurors late into the evening and signing two versions of the indictment—supported their claim of vindictive and politically motivated prosecution.

Despite his rebuke of the DOJ's "indict first, investigate second" way of handling the case, Fitzpatrick declined to block prosecutors from including additional discovery materials in future filings. Legal analysts noted that the decision to compel the release of grand-jury records was a major procedural victory for the defense, giving Comey's team its first opportunity to examine how Halligan presented the evidence.

=== November 13, 2025, hearing on legality of Halligan's appointment ===
A hearing on the legality of Halligan's appointment was held on November 13, 2025, before visiting Judge Cameron McGowan Currie. Comey attended the hearing. Currie simultaneously considered a similar motion from New York Attorney General Letitia James, whom Halligan is also prosecuting. As Halligan is the only federal prosecutor who signed the indictments of Comey and James, retroactively invalidating her appointment could end those cases.

To recap, President Donald Trump replaced U.S. Attorney Erik Siebert, who had reportedly resisted bringing charges, with Halligan, a former personal lawyer to the president with no prior prosecutorial experience. Within days, Halligan obtained indictments against Comey and against James. Because the district's judges voted to install Siebert it was necessary to assign a judge from another jurisdiction to decide any issue of the legality of Halligan's appointment.

Defense lawyers argued that Halligan's appointment violated 28 U.S.C. § 546, which provides that after an interim period expires, district judges, not the president or attorney general, must select a replacement until Senate confirmation. They warned that the administration's interpretation would permit indefinite reappointments, allowing an attorney general to perpetually install loyalists without Senate oversight.

Currie expressed skepticism of the government's position, noting that Trump's own successful challenge to the appointment of Special Counsel Jack Smith weakened the Justice Department's defense. Currie also revealed that sections of the grand-jury transcript in Comey's case were missing, adding "It became obvious to me that the attorney general could not have reviewed" the entire proceeding.

The Justice Department's actions have drawn comparisons to earlier failed attempts to install interim prosecutors, including Alina Habba in New Jersey and Sigal Chattah in Nevada, both of which were ruled unlawful. A legal scholar said the administration's approach reflected a sharp politicization of prosecutorial appointments.

On November 24, Currie ruled that Halligan had not been lawfully appointed, and she dismissed the indictments of Comey and of James. Currie wrote that, when Siebert was appointed as interim U.S. attorney on January 21, this started "[t]he 120-day clock". From May 21, the Attorney General no longer had appointment authority. Therefore, when Halligan assumed her position as interim U.S. attorney on September 22, she was "unlawfully serving in that role".

=== November 17, 2025, hearing on grand jury proceedings disclosure ===
On November 17, 2025, U.S. Magistrate Judge William Fitzpatrick ordered the release of the grand jury transcripts from the indictment of James Comey to the defense team. U.S. District Judge Michael Nachmanoff, who presides over the overall case, subsequently stayed the order to give the government time to file objections.

Fitzpatrick's (stayed) decision followed special prosecutor Lindsey Halligan's appeal of a November 5 ruling directing disclosure of the transcripts, in which the government argued that there were no "factually based grounds for disclosure" and asked that "the Court review the transcript of the grand jury in camera."

At the hearing, Fitzpatrick stated that "the government's actions in this case—whether purposeful, reckless, or negligent—raise genuine issues of misconduct, are inextricably linked to the government's grand jury presentation, and deserve to be fully explored by the defense." After reviewing video recordings of the grand jury proceedings, he concluded that factually based grounds for disclosure existed.

Fitzpatrick identified multiple issues supporting disclosure:

- that the search warrants used during the investigation did not protect Comey's attorney–client privileges;
- that the warrants may have violated the Fourth Amendment;
- that the government used materials from an earlier investigation without obtaining a new warrant;
- that a new warrant would likely have imposed a narrower scope; and that the government instead relied on materials:
  - seized five years earlier in a since-closed investigation;
  - never reviewed to determine their proper scope;
  - likely improperly retained by the government;
  - likely containing privileged communications;
  - and never subjected to new judicial review.

Fitzpatrick also cited irregularities in Halligan's grand jury presentation, including two misstatements of law:

1. that Comey did not have a Fifth Amendment right not to testify;
2. and that jurors did not need to rely on the evidence presented because the government would present stronger evidence at trial.

The judge further expressed concern that "the grand jury transcripts are incomplete and that there is missing material."

Fitzpatrick characterized disclosure as a straightforward remedy, stating that releasing the materials would allow the defense to make any appropriate motions, such as a motion to dismiss the indictment or suppress evidence, based on the full record.

He summarized his findings:

[T]he record points to a disturbing pattern of profound investigative missteps, missteps that led an FBI agent and a prosecutor to potentially undermine the integrity of the grand jury proceeding. Therefore, in this case, "the Court has before it a rare example of a criminal defendant who can actually make a 'particularized and factually based' showing that irregularities may have occurred in the grand jury proceedings and may justify the dismissal of one or more counts of the indictment.

Judge Nachmanoff's stay left the disclosure order temporarily on hold pending objections from the government and a subsequent response from the defense.

=== November 19, 2025, hearing on vindictive-prosecution motion ===
On November 19, 2025, U.S. District Judge Michael S. Nachmanoff held a hearing on the defenses motion to dismiss his indictment as a vindictive prosecution driven by President Donald Trump.

For dismissal on vindictive-prosecution grounds, the defense would have to establish that prosecutors "acted with genuine animus" against him or were "prevailed upon to bring the charges by another with animus such that the prosecutor could be considered a 'stalking horse,'". Comey's attorneys argued that dismissal is warranted because prosecutors acted with "genuine animus", Halligan served as a "stalking horse" for Trump, and that Comey would not have been prosecuted "but for" that animus. Defense attorney Michael Dreeben cited Trump's years of public attacks on Comey, his post demanding that Attorney General Pam Bondi "prosecute" Comey days before the statute of limitations ran, the firing of U.S. Attorney Erik Siebert, and the removal of Maurene Comey from SDNY.

Dreeben argued this reflected a breakdown of DOJ independence and "unprecedented" political use of criminal prosecution. During an exchange Judge Nachmanoff asked the defense "So your view is that Ms. Halligan is a stalking horse or a puppet, for want of a better word, doing the president's bidding?". Dreeben replied "Well, I don't want to use language about Ms. Halligan that suggests anything other than she did what she was told to do. The president of the United States has the authority to direct prosecutions. She worked in the White House. She was surely aware of the president's directive."

Judge Nachmanoff pressed the defense on whether interim U.S. Attorney Lindsey Halligan acted as a "stalking horse" for Trump; defense attorney Dreeben responded she "did what she was told."

==== The declination memo ====
Nachmanoff questioned whether career prosecutors had prepared a declination memo recommending against charges. Assistant U.S. Attorney N. Tyler Lemons said he had been instructed by Deputy Attorney General Todd Blanche not to reveal whether such a memo existed. According to The Washington Post, two individuals familiar with the matter confirmed the memo exists.

==== Grand jury irregularities ====
The hearing shifted when Halligan acknowledged that the full grand jury never saw the final two-count indictment. After grand jurors rejected one of three proposed charges, Halligan revised the indictment but presented the updated document only to the foreperson, not the full panel. Dreeben argued that "there is no indictment", because the revised charges were never presented to the full grand jury.

==== Outcome ====
Nachmanoff declined to rule immediately, calling the issues "too weighty and too complex", and requested additional filings on the grand-jury matter.

=== November 24, 2025, case dismissed ===
On November 24, 2025, Senior U.S. District Judge Cameron McGowan Currie dismissed the criminal case against James Comey in the United States District Court for the Eastern District of Virginia, holding that interim U.S. attorney Lindsey Halligan had been unlawfully appointed in violation of 28 U.S.C. § 546 and the Appointments Clause of the U.S. Constitution.

The court simultaneously dismissed the related indictment of New York Attorney General Letitia James, concluding that Halligan lacked lawful authority to bring either case. Reuters described the ruling as an "extraordinary rebuke" of the Trump administration's efforts to circumvent Senate confirmation by installing political loyalists in federal prosecutor posts.

Judge Currie found that the Attorney General's 120-day interim appointment authority had expired on May 21, 2025, months before Halligan's September 22 appointment, which rendered her selection legally void and left appointment authority with the district court.

Because Halligan was never validly appointed and acted alone before the grand jury, the court held that all prosecutorial actions she took, including grand jury presentations and signed indictments, were void. Judge Currie rejected the Justice Department's attempt to retroactively cure the defect, writing that such a theory would allow "any private citizen off the street—attorney or not—to secure an indictment" so long as the Attorney General later approved it.

Invoking Lucia v. SEC and Ryder v. United States, the court vacated Halligan's actions and dismissed both indictments without prejudice. The ruling left uncertainty about whether Comey could ever be prosecuted again. The five-year statute of limitations on his alleged offenses expired on September 30, 2025, and analysts noted that prosecutors may now be time-barred from refiling charges.

Comey welcomed the decision, calling the prosecution "malevolent and incompetent", though he suggested he expected President Trump to continue targeting him.

The decision also aligned with other judicial rulings that invalidated similar interim U.S. attorney appointments during the Trump administration in New Jersey, Nevada, and California.

=== February 9, 2026 appeal ===
On February 9, 2026, the DOJ filed an appeal with the Fourth Circuit Court of Appeals, arguing that Halligan had not been improperly appointed and the case should not have been dismissed. Oral argument was heard on September 15, 2026, by an appellate panel consisting of Chief Judge Albert Diaz, Senior Judge Henry Floyd and Judge Julius Richardson.

== Reactions ==
President Trump has commented publicly about the case, stating at Truth Social: "One of the worst human beings this Country has ever been exposed to is James Comey, the former Corrupt Head of the FBI". Trump also claimed the case is about "justice not revenge."

"The apolitical prosecutors who analyzed this said there wasn't a case", said former special counsel Jack Smith on October 8, 2025, "and so they brought somebody in who had never been a criminal prosecutor on day's notice to secure an indictment a day before the statute of limitations ended. That just reeks of lack of process."

On January 12, 2026, it was reported that Robert McBride, another prosecutor with the U.S. attorney's office for the Eastern District of Virginia, was fired after refusing to re-indict Comey.
