= Prosecution of Letitia James =

2025 criminal case in Virginia, US

United States v. James
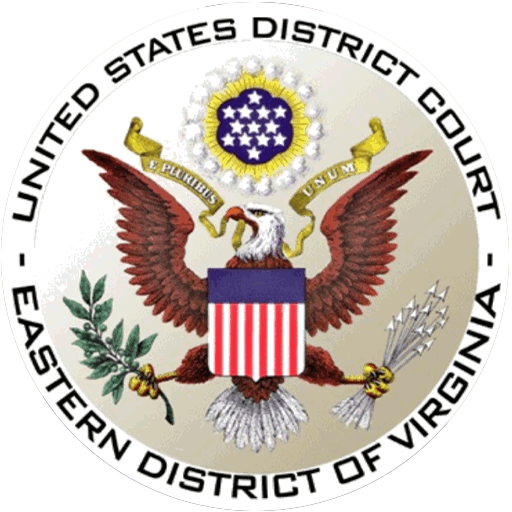
- Court: United States District Court for the Eastern District of Virginia
- Full case name: United States of America v. Letitia A. James
- Docket nos.: 2:25-cr-00122

Court membership
- Judge sitting: Jamar K. Walker

On October 9, 2025, Letitia James, the attorney general of New York, was indicted by a federal grand jury in Virginia on two counts: one charge of bank fraud and one charge of making false statements to a financial institution. The charges stem from allegations that James misrepresented the nature of a property she purchased in Norfolk, Virginia, in 2020, to secure more favorable loan terms. James denied the allegations and pleaded not guilty when arraigned on October 24, 2025; the charges were dismissed without prejudice on November 24, so the case did not go to trial. The Justice Department sought a new indictment, but in December, two grand juries each declined to indict James.

The indictment was brought against James following extended calls by President Donald Trump to pursue multiple political opponents, including James. Career prosecutors who previously handled the case believed evidence against James was insufficient to bring charges, and were subsequently fired. The case against James was brought by Lindsey Halligan, one of President Trump's former personal attorneys, who he hand-picked to be the new interim U.S. Attorney for the Eastern District of Virginia. In addition to this, the prosecution was described as politically motivated, since she had previously sued Trump.

== Background ==
In April 2025, Bill Pulte, President Donald Trump's pick to head the Federal Housing Finance Agency (FHFA), referred Letitia James, attorney general of New York, to the United States Department of Justice (DOJ) for possible criminal prosecution. At the time, Trump had for an extended period called for criminal procedures against James, as well as other political opponents. The referral alleged that James misrepresented information in order to obtain government assistance and more favorable mortgage terms. The claims included misrepresenting an investment property as her primary residence, misrepresenting the number of units in a property, and misrepresenting her father as her spouse. James denied the allegations, calling them "baseless" and politically motivated.

In May 2025, the FBI opened a formal criminal investigation into the mortgage fraud claims. Her lawyer stated that any inaccuracies on loan documents were minor errors and presented alternative property deeds to support her position. In early August, the DOJ escalated its investigation by opening a civil rights inquiry into James’s office concerning its actions in a separate New York business fraud lawsuit against the Trump Organization. A special prosecutor was also appointed to examine her real estate transactions.

By September 2025, federal prosecutors in Virginia reportedly found insufficient evidence to bring charges. Following this development, the U.S. Attorney for the Eastern District of Virginia, Erik Siebert, stepped down after Trump administration officials reportedly signaled an intent to replace him, with President Trump saying "I want him out" one day prior to Siebert's resignation. Within days of Siebert's resignation, Trump appointed one of his former personal attorneys, Lindsey Halligan, as the interim U.S. Attorney for the district. Elizabeth Yusi, another prosecutor in the district, also reportedly found no probable cause to pursue charges, and authored an internal memo explaining the lack of evidence in the case. It was alleged that Yusi had sent investigative files related to the James case to her own personal email account, in violation of DOJ policy. Yusi's attorney said that she had "never used her personal email account for any portion of any investigation". Yusi was subsequently fired by Halligan in mid-October.

In October 2025, James filed a request with the judge in charge of her case, seeking to bar federal prosecutors from speaking with the media, in order to ensure a fair trial. The filing came within days of a published report from Lawfare, which revealed that Halligan had reached out to a journalist who works with the outlet to share criticisms and complaints about their reporting on the case. According to CBS News, James's attorney alleged that Halligan's conduct and comments about evidence in the case had "violated court rules and internal Justice Department policies that bar the sharing of grand jury information and restrict prosecutors' out-of-court statements".

== Indictment ==
On October 9, 2025, a federal grand jury in the United States District Court for the Eastern District of Virginia indicted Letitia James on one count of bank fraud under 18 U.S.C. § 1344 and one count of making false statements to a financial institution under 18 U.S.C. § 1014. The indictment alleges that James misrepresented the status of a property she purchased in order to obtain more favorable mortgage terms.

The case has been assigned to Judge Jamar K. Walker. If convicted, James faces potential penalties including up to 30 years in prison per count, fines of up to $1 million per count, and possible forfeiture. Federal prosecutors emphasize that an indictment is merely an accusation and that James is presumed innocent until proven guilty.

James has denied the charges, describing them as politically motivated. At her arraignment on October 24, 2025, she pleaded not guilty. A trial was scheduled for January 26, 2026.

Two weeks after she was indicted, James' attorney, Abbe Lowell, filed several motions to dismiss; the motions allege that Halligan was unlawfully appointed, that the charges are inappropriate, and vindictive and selective prosecution. James Comey, in a separate prosecution, has also alleged that Halligan was unlawfully appointed. Comey's motion was referred to Albert Diaz, the chief judge of the U.S. Court of Appeals for the Fourth Circuit, who assigned this part of his case to Cameron McGowan Currie, a senior judge in the U.S. District Court for the District of South Carolina; the assignment allows the motion to be heard in a district other than the one where Halligan serves as the interim U.S. Attorney. Currie considered Comey's and James' motions regarding Halligan on November 13, 2025; James did not attend the hearing. As Halligan is the only federal prosecutor who signed the indictments, retroactively invalidating her appointment could end those cases.

=== Dismissal ===
On November 24, Currie ruled that Halligan had not been lawfully appointed, and she dismissed without prejudice the indictments of James and of Comey. Currie wrote that, when Siebert was appointed as interim U.S. attorney on January 21, this started "[t]he 120-day clock". From May 21, the Attorney General no longer had appointment authority. Therefore, when Halligan assumed her position as interim U.S. attorney on September 22, she was "unlawfully serving in that role". In mid-December, the DOJ appealed the dismissal. As Halligan's appointment had been on an interim basis anyway, it had only been set to last 120 days, and she resigned on January 20, 2026, acknowledging that her tenure had ended.

=== Attempts to secure another indictment ===
Less than two weeks after Currie dismissed the indictment against James, DOJ prosecutors in Norfolk, Virginia, sought a second indictment. However, on December 4, 2025, the grand jury declined to indict her. On December 11, a federal grand jury in Alexandria, Virginia similarly declined to indict her.

John Sarcone, the Trump administration’s pick for US Attorney for the Northern District of New York, began working on two criminal investigations into James, but on January 8, 2026, federal judge Lorna Schofield ruled that he was "not lawfully serving as Acting U.S. Attorney" and therefore must cease his work on the investigations.

=== Appeal ===
On February 9, 2026, the DOJ filed an appeal with the Fourth Circuit Court of Appeals, arguing that Halligan had not been improperly appointed and the case should not have been dismissed.

== Reactions ==
New York Governor Kathy Hochul condemned the indictment, calling it politically motivated. Civil rights organizations, including the National Council of Negro Women, expressed concern about the broader implications of the indictment, particularly its impact on black women in leadership. Legal experts cited by Associated Press questioned the strength of the allegations, noting that cases of this nature are rare without clear evidence of fraud or deliberate wrongdoing.

In their book Regime Change, co-authors Maggie Haberman and Jonathan Swan report that Trump told a White House advisor he didn't care whether James was convicted, and that the true goal was to drag James into court. "I want to make her life miserable," Trump reportedly told the advisor.

On October 30, 2025, the Trump administration fired about a dozen officials in Fannie Mae’s ethics and internal investigations unit. The fired officials had been probing (following an internal complaint) whether other senior officials, under direction of Bill Pulte, had improperly ordered staff to pull mortgage records of Democratic officials. A complaint about James's records had been elevated to the Office of Inspector General for the Federal Housing Finance Agency headed by Pulte, which passed it on to the U.S. attorney’s office in eastern Virginia that had brought the criminal case against James.
