= Anthony Trenga =

American judge (born 1949)

Presiding Judge of the United States Foreign Intelligence Surveillance Court
- In office May 19, 2023 – May 19, 2026
- Preceded by: Rudolph Contreras
- Succeeded by: Carl J. Nichols

Senior Judge of the United States District Court for the Eastern District of Virginia
- Incumbent
- Assumed office June 1, 2021

Judge of the United States Foreign Intelligence Surveillance Court
- In office May 28, 2020 – May 19, 2026
- Appointed by: John Roberts
- Preceded by: Rosemary M. Collyer
- Succeeded by: Michael S. Nachmanoff

Judge of the United States District Court for the Eastern District of Virginia
- In office October 14, 2008 – June 1, 2021
- Appointed by: George W. Bush
- Preceded by: Walter D. Kelley Jr.
- Succeeded by: Michael S. Nachmanoff

Personal details
- Born: Anthony John Trenga; 1949 (age 76–77) Wilmerding, Pennsylvania
- Education: Princeton University (AB); University of Virginia (JD); Duke University (LLM)

Anthony John Trenga (born 1949) is a senior United States district judge of the United States District Court for the Eastern District of Virginia as well as the Presiding Judge of the Foreign Intelligence Surveillance Court.

== Education ==
Trenga was born in Wilmerding, Pennsylvania. He graduated from Mercersburg Academy in 1967 before attending Princeton University, where he graduated with an A.B. from the Princeton School of Public and International Affairs (then the Woodrow Wilson School) in 1971 after completing a senior thesis titled "The Need to Be: The Philosophical Foundations of the 'Movement to the People.'" He received a Juris Doctor from the University of Virginia School of Law in 1974 and a Master of Laws from Duke University Law School. He was a law clerk to Judge Ted Dalton of the United States District Court for the Western District of Virginia from 1974 to 1975.

== Career ==
From 1975 to 1987, Trenga was in private practice in Washington, D.C., with the law firm Sachs, Greenebaum & Tayler, becoming a partner in 1982. He was managing partner at Hazel & Thomas in Alexandria, Virginia from 1987 to 1998, and back in Washington, D.C., from 1998 to 2008 ending as chair of the litigation department of Miller & Chevalier. He is a fellow of the American College of Trial Lawyers and the International Society of Barristers and a member of the American Law Institute.

=== Federal judicial service ===
Trenga was nominated to serve as a United States district judge by President George W. Bush on July 17, 2008, to a seat vacated by Judge Walter DeKalb Kelley Jr. He was confirmed by the United States Senate on September 26, 2008, and received his commission on October 14, 2008. Trenga assumed senior status on June 1, 2021.

=== Notable cases ===
In October 2009, Trenga set aside the jury conviction of two top salespeople at Teach Me to Trade, a part of Whitney Information Network, which uses infomercials and hotel seminars across the country to sell courses and software on making money in the stock market. In a 51-page ruling, Trenga said prosecutors failed to show Utah residents Linda Woolf and David Gengler had been part of any fraud scheme.

On March 24, 2017, Trenga was the first federal judge to rule in favor of the Trump administration's executive order that limits travel from six Muslim-majority countries.

On September 4, 2019, Trenga ruled that the United States government's watchlist of “known or suspected terrorists” violates the constitutional rights of those listed on it.

On September 24, 2019, Trenga set aside the conviction of Bijan Khan, business partner of Donald Trump's former National Security Advisor Michael Flynn, on acting as an agent for a foreign power without notifying the Justice Department.

In May 2019, Trenga ordered Chelsea Manning to be jailed for civil contempt for her refusal to testify before a grand jury pursuant to a subpoena. This came a week after Manning was freed after 62 days in jail for her defiance of a previous grand jury subpoena. In March 2020, Trenga rescinded his order directing Manning's jailing after she attempted to kill herself the day before. Trenga ordered that Manning pay $256,000 in fines that had accumulated over the course of her confinement.

== Sources ==
Legal offices
Preceded by Walter D. Kelley Jr.	Judge of the United States District Court for the Eastern District of Virginia; 2008–2021	Succeeded by Michael S. Nachmanoff
Preceded by Rosemary M. Collyer	Judge of the United States Foreign Intelligence Surveillance Court; 2020–2026	Succeeded by Michael S. Nachmanoff
Preceded by Rudolph Contreras	Presiding Judge of the United States Foreign Intelligence Surveillance Court; 2023–2026	Succeeded by Carl J. Nichols
