= Michael S. Nachmanoff =

American judge (born 1968)

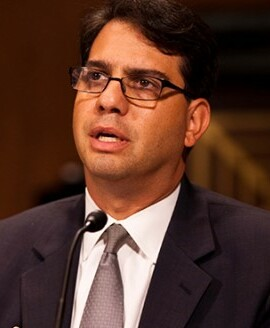
- Nachmanoff in 2013

Judge of the United States Foreign Intelligence Surveillance Court
- Incumbent
- Assumed office May 19, 2026
- Appointed by: John Roberts
- Preceded by: Anthony J. Trenga

Judge of the United States District Court for the Eastern District of Virginia
- Incumbent
- Assumed office November 2, 2021
- Appointed by: Joe Biden
- Preceded by: Anthony J. Trenga

Magistrate Judge of the United States District Court for the Eastern District of Virginia
- In office March 1, 2015 – November 2, 2021

Personal details
- Born: 1968 (age 57–58) Washington, D.C., U.S.
- Education: Wesleyan University (BA); University of Virginia (JD)

Michael Stefan Nachmanoff (born 1968) is an American lawyer who serves as a United States district judge of the United States District Court for the Eastern District of Virginia. He served as a magistrate judge of the same court from 2015 to 2021.

== Early life and education ==
Nachmanoff was born in 1968 in Washington, D.C.; he grew up in Arlington, Virginia. He received his Bachelor of Arts from Wesleyan University in 1991 and his Juris Doctor from the University of Virginia School of Law in 1995. He is Jewish.

== Career ==
After graduating law school, Nachmanoff served as a law clerk for Judge Leonie Brinkema of the United States District Court for the Eastern District of Virginia from 1995 to 1996. After his clerkship, he joined the firm Cohen, Gettings & Dunham, P.C, where he was an associate from 1996 to 2000 and a partner from 2000 to 2002. From 2002 to 2015, Nachmanoff served in the Office of the Federal Public Defender for the Eastern District of Virginia starting as the first assistant public defender from 2002 to 2005, the acting federal public defender from 2005 to 2007, and the chief federal public defender from 2007 to 2015.

In 2007, he argued the case Kimbrough v. United States before the U.S. Supreme Court, in which the Court ruled district judges have discretion to depart from Federal Sentencing Guidelines in cases involving crack cocaine.

=== Federal judicial service ===
Nachmanoff was sworn in as a United States magistrate judge on March 1, 2015.

In April 2021, Senators Mark Warner and Tim Kaine recommended Nachmanoff to be a United States District Judge for the Eastern District of Virginia to the seat vacated by Judge Liam O'Grady. On June 30, 2021, President Joe Biden announced his intent to nominate Nachmanoff to serve as a United States district judge for the United States District Court for the Eastern District of Virginia. On July 13, 2021, his nomination was sent to the Senate. President Biden nominated Nachmanoff to the seat vacated by Judge Anthony Trenga. On July 28, 2021, a hearing on his nomination was held before the Senate Judiciary Committee. On September 23, 2021, his nomination was reported out of committee by a 13–9 vote. On October 26, 2021, the United States Senate invoked cloture on his nomination by a 51–46 vote. On October 27, 2021, his nomination was confirmed by a 52–46 vote. He received his judicial commission on November 2, 2021.

=== Comey case ===
In September 2025, Nachmanoff was randomly assigned to preside over the federal criminal case against former FBI Director James Comey, who was indicted on charges of making false statements to Congress and obstruction. The case drew attention due to the circumstances of the indictment, which was obtained by interim U.S. Attorney Lindsey Halligan days before the statute of limitations expired, after career prosecutors had recommended against charges.

During a November 19, 2025 hearing on Comey's motion to dismiss for vindictive prosecution, Nachmanoff pressed prosecutors on whether career attorneys had prepared a declination memo recommending against charges; Assistant U.S. Attorney N. Tyler Lemons stated he had been instructed by Deputy Attorney General Todd Blanche not to reveal whether such a memo existed.

The hearing revealed that the full grand jury had never seen the final two-count indictment; after jurors rejected one of three proposed charges, Halligan revised the indictment but presented the updated document only to the foreperson. Nachmanoff declined to rule immediately, calling the issues "too weighty and too complex." A trial is scheduled for January 2026.

== See also ==
- List of Jewish American jurists

Legal offices
| Preceded by Anthony Trenga | Judge of the United States District Court for the Eastern District of Virginia; 2021–present | Incumbent |
| Preceded by Anthony Trenga | Judge of the United States Foreign Intelligence Surveillance Court; 2026–present | Incumbent |
