= 2025 Pentagon press pass forfeiture =

October 2025 US journalism incident

On October 16, 2025, a number of news organizations that cover the United States Department of Defense from its headquarters, The Pentagon, chose to forfeit their press passes rather than agree to new restrictive reporting rules imposed by the Department of Defense.

At least 30 publications and dozens of journalists that regularly covered the Pentagon forfeited their press credentials upon receiving new directives from Defense Secretary Pete Hegseth, which stated that reporters were only allowed to cover pre-approved news. The updated requirements were rejected by all but a single far-right outlet, and included ABC News, NBC News, CBS News, Fox News, CNN, Newsmax, The Associated Press, Reuters, Bloomberg News, The New York Times, The Washington Post, The Wall Street Journal, The Guardian, The Atlantic, The Washington Times, Financial Times, Politico, and NPR. One America News said that it would sign the agreement to cover only pre-approved news, and remain in the building.

On December 4, The New York Times Company filed a lawsuit against the Defense Department seeking an injunction to bar enforcement of the press pass rules, arguing that the policy violates the Freedom of Speech and Freedom of the Press Clauses of the First Amendment and the Due Process Clause of the Fifth Amendment. On March 20, 2026, the court found that the Pentagon's press policy was unconstitutional, and ordered a permanent injunction, halting further enforcement of the revised rules.

== Background ==
In May 2025, the United States Department of Defense released a memo to resident and visiting press assigned to the Pentagon.

In October 2025, Defense Secretary Pete Hegseth implemented new press policies with a series of changes that led to multiple news outlets turning in their press credentials, most citing one key rule which places a ban on reporters soliciting any information, classified or otherwise, from government employees without prior authorization from the Pentagon.

The Pentagon called the new press restrictions an important step in "preventing leaks that damage operational security and national security.” Press outlets see the new restrictions as an "attempt to curb First Amendment protections."

Lawyers for national news outlets had been negotiating with the Pentagon for weeks over the policy prior to the mass forfeiture, with The New York Times reporting that the new rules "are a stark departure — in length and scope — from the previous guidelines the Pentagon required journalists to sign to obtain a press pass."

The role of the media at the Pentagon was solicitation of information that is used to enhance public knowledge regarding the goings on of the United States military. It is noted that reporting on U.S. military affairs will continue, but from a greater distance than before.

== Developments and backlash ==
Defense trade media, Military Times and Defense News joined other media outlets in the forfeiture, releasing the following statement: "This policy threatens to punish reporters who ask legitimate questions in the course of their daily work and to impose material harm on our news organizations for factual reporting."

Only 15 reporters signed and accepted the new press policy out of hundreds that forfeited their credentials. Those 15 include staff from The Federalist, The Epoch Times and One America News, as well as reporters working for overseas media outlets, independent reporters and freelancers.

Reporters from several news outlets such as the Associated Press, Fox, and the New York Times were encouraged by their companies to vacate the Pentagon instead of signing on to the new set of orders.

=== Vacating the press room ===
Media outlets who refused to accept the new policies were given until October 17, 2025 to remove their belongings. On October 15, reporters began vacating the press room at the Pentagon removing computer servers, furniture, television screens, soundproofing equipment and other items.

=== Replacements ===
Following the vacation of the press room by non-participating media outlets, the Pentagon invited replacements to take their places, including LifeSiteNews, Gateway Pundit, and Human Events. Additionally, this list includes the National Pulse, podcaster Tim Pool, Frontlines by Turning Point USA, among others.

The American Conservative's executive director Curt Mills stated the magazine declined an invitation by the department to join new outlets credentialed for access, commenting that "we are not in the stenography business" and that "agreeing to preemptive publication restrictions on newsworthy material" would betray the trust of its readers.

=== Context ===
The change in Pentagon press policies and replacement of notable legacy news outlets is one of the latest decisions within the broader trend of increased press and media scrutiny under the Trump administration. Along with the momentary de-platforming of Jimmy Kimmel's talk show on ABC in response to commentary on Charlie Kirk's death and the Republican party, also in 2025 Congress made a $1.1 billion cut to NPR and PBS public broadcasting funds, and President Trump filed a $10 billion defamation lawsuit against The Wall Street Journal. Increased scrutiny related to the press and media as well as physical safety of journalists and reporting mechanisms can be found on the Press Freedom Tracker Incident Database, where relevant instances of arrest, assaults, legal orders, damages, or other tactics against the press and media can be reported upon and tracked.

=== New York Times Company v. Department of Defense ===
The New York Times Company v. Department of Defense
- Court: United States District Court for the District of Columbia
- Started: December 4, 2025; 9 months ago
- Docket nos.: 1:25-cv-04218

Court membership
- Judge sitting: Paul L. Friedman

In December 2025, the New York Times sued the Department of Defense, Pete Hegseth, and Sean Parnell seeking an injunction, claiming the Pentagon's policy violated First and Fifth Amendment rights. On March 20, 2026, Judge Paul Friedman ruled for the Times, finding the Pentagon's press policy unconstitutional. The court imposed a permanent injunction, and ordered the restoration of press credentials and access for the New York Times journalists. A second attempt to limit press access at the Pentagon was struck down in early April 2026, with Friedman calling the new restrictions "rather transparent attempts to negate the impact of this court’s order."
