= Donald Trump third term proposal =

Possible 2028 US presidential campaign

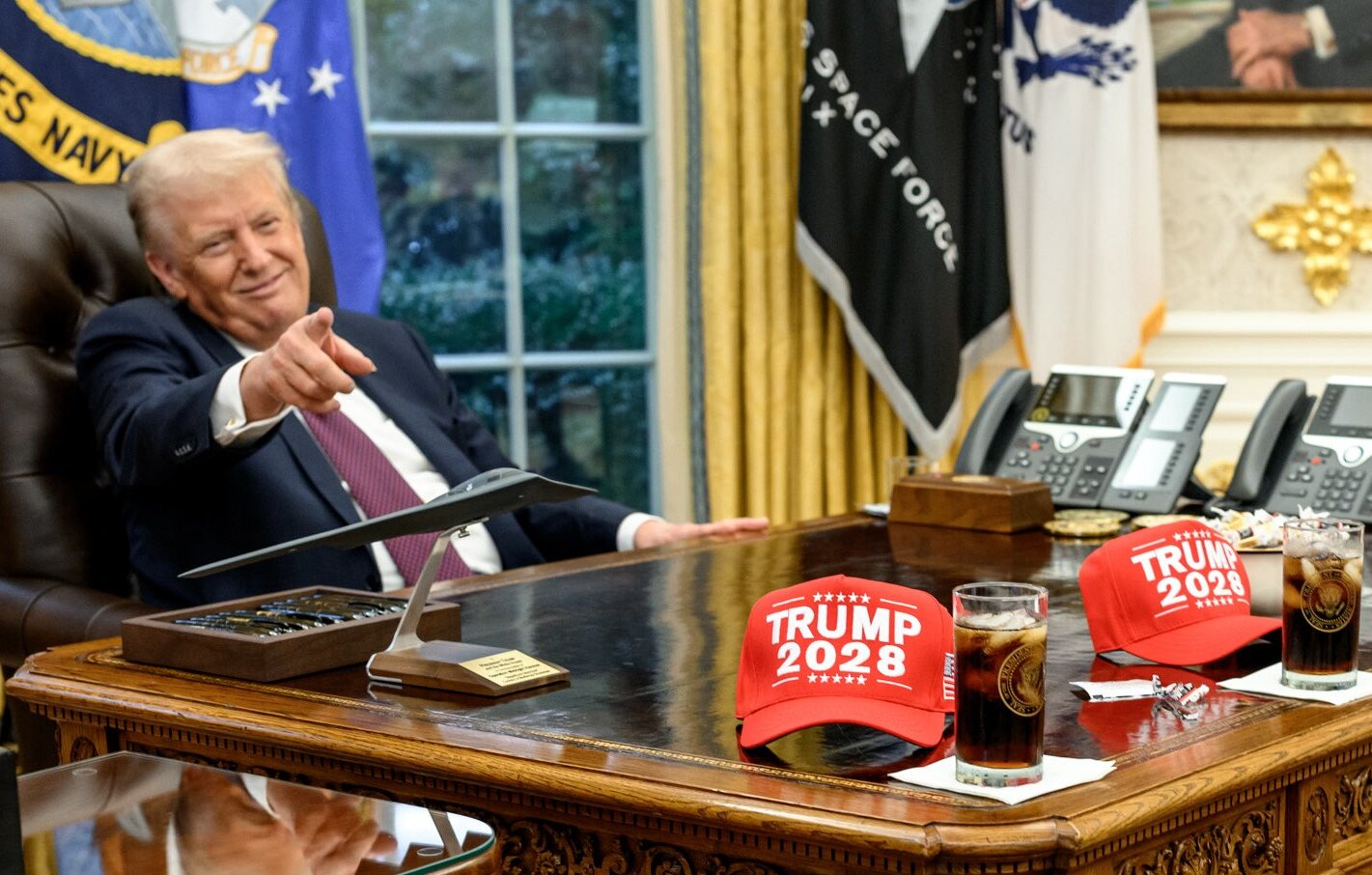
President Donald Trump displays two red hats on his desk in the Oval Office promoting a 2028 run.

Donald Trump was the 45th and is the 47th president of the United States. He was first elected president in 2016, lost the 2020 election (though falsely claimed victory) and was elected to a second nonconsecutive term in 2024. Trump has repeatedly raised the possibility of remaining in office for more than two terms, despite the Twenty-second Amendment to the United States Constitution prohibiting any person being elected president more than twice. Trump has made inconsistent statements around this topic, sometimes claiming to be joking about the possibility or using it to antagonize his opponents.

== History ==
=== First term ===
In March 2018, Trump praised Chinese leader Xi Jinping for repealing term limits and even suggested serving as "president for life". (Note: Xi explained the decision in terms of needing to align two more powerful posts—General Secretary of the Chinese Communist Party and Chairman of the Central Military Commission (CMC)—which have no term limits. However, Xi did not say whether he intended to serve simultaneously as party general secretary, CMC chairman, and state president for three or more terms.) In November that year, he later confirmed that he would not push for a third term. In April 2019, he joked about remaining in office for ten more years. In June 2019, he stated that he would only joke about violating the 22nd Amendment.

=== Second term ===
Before and after his election victory in 2024, the thought of him serving beyond a second term was brought up once again, with support from his Republican allies and concerns from Democratic politicians. Democrat Gavin Newsom, the governor of California, has said that Trump may try to rig the 2028 elections so he can illegally run for a third term. Trump also floated the idea of suspending or canceling all elections during the midterm elections of 2026. New York Democratic representative Dan Goldman planned to introduce a resolution affirming the Twenty-second Amendment, while Democratic California state senator Tom Umberg introduced a bill as a preemptive measure to prevent Trump from potentially carrying out his plan to run for president again in 2028. On January 5, 2026, California state assembly member Dawn Addis introduced legislation to prevent Trump's name from appearing on the ballot in California should he be renominated for a third term.

In March 2025, Trump floated the possibility of serving a third term in an interview with NBC News, saying "A lot of people want me to do it. But, I mean, I basically tell them we have a long way to go, you know, it's very early in the administration. I'm focused on the current." He added that "there are methods" to run for a third term and that he was "not joking". On April 24, 2025, multiple news outlets reported that the Trump store was selling "Trump 2028" hats.

In a May 2025 interview with NBC News, Trump said he would make it his goal to serve only two terms; he cited JD Vance, his second vice president, and Marco Rubio, his third secretary of State, as potential successors.

Trump said in an August 2025 interview on CNBC's Squawk Box that he would like to run for a third term, but he would "probably not" run. Later that month, Trump quipped that he could cancel the 2028 elections if the United States were at war, after Ukrainian president Volodymyr Zelenskyy used a similar justification for not holding elections amid the Russo-Ukrainian war.

During a meeting before the 2025 government shutdown with Democratic congressional leaders, Hakeem Jeffries and Chuck Schumer, Trump had red hats with "Trump 2028" emblazoned on the front. Jeffries later spoke after Trump posted an AI-generated video to Truth Social of him throwing the hats at Jeffries, indicating the hats had appeared on the desk during the meeting and when he asked JD Vance if Vance had a problem with it, Vance responded "No comment".

In May 2026, Trump joked "When I get out of office in, let's say, eight or nine years from now".

In July 2026, during a speech marking the United States Semiquincentennial on the National Mall, Trump joked that he is serving a third term.

On July 24, 2026, at the 2026 White House Correspondents Dinner, Trump announced that he intended to seek a "fourth term", and put on a hat that read "Trump 2028". Trump then went on to falsely claim that he performed very well while running for a second term in 2020 but lost due to alleged fraud in the 2020 United States presidential election. On August 12, 2026, he stated that while he would love to run for a third term, he also admitted that "law is very strong" about term limits.

On October 22, 2026, at a midterm campaign rally in Sioux City, Iowa, Trump said he believed the law prohibited a third term, describing the relevant constitutional language as "quite concise" with "not a lot of wiggle room". He then stated, "Well, the one thing that's different. They cheated us on the second one 'cause we won it three times. So I think I have the right to run again", and repeated that he had the right because "they cheated", referring to his false claims about the 2020 election.

== Proposals from allies of Donald Trump ==
In January 2025, Tennessee representative Andy Ogles proposed a resolution to amend the Twenty-second Amendment to allow presidents who serve two nonconsecutive terms to seek a third term. The amendment would not permit living presidents Bill Clinton, George W. Bush, or Barack Obama to run for a third term, due to the allowed third term being contingent on the first two being nonconsecutive. Trump is the only living president to have served two nonconsecutive terms. (Note: Before Trump, Grover Cleveland served two nonconsecutive terms, from 1885 to 1889 and from 1893 to 1897; he died in 1908.) At CPAC 2025, conservative groups such as the Third Term Project supported Ogles' resolution and promoted the idea of Trump running for a currently unconstitutional third term. Ogles lost re-nomination to former Tennessee Agriculture Commissioner Charlie Hatcher in 2026.

Steve Bannon, a former White House strategist during Trump's first administration, has also been openly vocal of a third term for Donald Trump, insisting that he is "going to be President in 2028, and people just ought to get accommodated with that". He further iterated in February 2026 that Trump should deploy ICE agents and military troops at polling stations ahead of the 2026 midterm elections to "never again allow an election to be stolen", a proposal which is prohibited by federal law.
