= Daniel Richman =

American attorney

- Born: Daniel Charles Richman
- Education: Harvard University; Yale Law School
- Occupation: Law professor
- Employer: Columbia Law School

Daniel C. Richman is an American attorney. He is the Paul J. Kellner Professor of Law at Columbia Law School.

== Education ==
Richman received a bachelor's degree from Harvard University in 1980, and a J.D. from Yale Law School in 1984.

== Career ==
Richman served as a federal prosecutor in the U.S. Attorney's Office for the Southern District of New York. He was the Brendan Moore Professor in Advocacy at Fordham Law School, before taking his current position at Columbia.

Following the June 8, 2017, public hearing at the United States Senate Select Committee on Intelligence, Richman confirmed to reporters that he was the person former FBI Director that James Comey had instructed to reveal the contents of Comey's memos detailing conversation with President Donald Trump. He was a special government employee for the Federal Bureau of Investigation (FBI). Richman served as an aide to Comey and they are longtime friends.
