= Erik Siebert =

American attorney (born 1979)

United States Attorney for the Eastern District of Virginia
- In office January 21, 2025 – September 19, 2025; Interim: January 21, 2025 – May 20, 2025
- President: Donald Trump
- Preceded by: Jessica Aber
- Succeeded by: Maggie Cleary

Personal details
- Born: Erik Sean Siebert; August 1979 (age 47)
- Spouse: Anne Gray Cullen (m. 2005)
- Education: Virginia Military Institute (BA); University of Richmond (JD)

Siebert at a March 2025 press conference

Erik Sean Siebert (born August 1979) is an American attorney who served as the United States attorney for the Eastern District of Virginia from January to September 2025.

== Early life and education ==
Erik Sean Siebert was born in August 1979. He graduated from West Springfield High School and from Virginia Military Institute with a bachelor's degree in history.

== Career ==
=== Metropolitan Police Department and clerkships (2005–2010) ===
By April 2005, Siebert had been working for the Metropolitan Police Department of the District of Columbia. In October, he married Anne Gray Cullen, a kindergarten teacher for Fairfax County Public Schools. Cullen's father is Richard Cullen, the counselor to the governor of Virginia, Glenn Youngkin, and the state's former attorney general and United States attorney. Siebert served as a patrol officer and a vice investigator for the Metropolitan Police Department before resigning to pursue a Juris Doctor from the University of Richmond School of Law. He graduated in 2009. Siebert interned for federal magistrate judge M. Hannah Lauck and the City of Richmond Commonwealth Attorney's Office. From 2009 to 2010, Siebert was a law clerk to U.S. District Court Judge Henry E. Hudson in Richmond, Virginia.

=== U.S. Attorney's Office for the Eastern District of Virginia ===
In November 2010, Neil MacBride, the United States attorney for the Eastern District of Virginia, named Siebert as an assistant U.S. attorney for the office's Richmond division. In 2019, he became the deputy criminal supervisor for the Richmond division.

=== U.S. Attorney for the Eastern District of Virginia (January–September 2025) ===
Judicial order unanimously appointing Erik Siebert as U.S. Attorney

In the second presidential transition of Donald Trump, advisors to the governor of Virginia, Glenn Youngkin, recommended Siebert. He took office on January 21, 2025, following Trump's inauguration, succeeding Jessica Aber. As the end of Siebert's 120-day set tenure neared, Virginia's senators, Tim Kaine and Mark Warner, recommended Trump nominate Siebert to retain him. The following month, federal judges in the district unanimously voted to keep Siebert in his position and Trump nominated him. The Senate Committee on the Judiciary voted in September to advance his nomination.

As U.S. attorney, Siebert worked with Emil Bove, the acting U.S. deputy attorney general and principal associate deputy attorney general, on immigration and gang cases. He was respected by several officials in the Trump administration and in Congress, including Iowa senator Chuck Grassley, the chair of the Committee on the Judiciary.

In September, ABC News reported that Trump was expected to fire Siebert after investigators could not find sufficient evidence to indict Letitia James, the attorney general of New York, for mortgage fraud. According to The New Yorker, "Siebert had balked at bringing criminal charges against two of Trump's supposed enemies", namely Letitia James, and former FBI director James Comey. Bill Pulte, the director of the Federal Housing Finance Agency, initiated the plan to remove Siebert. On September 19, Trump gave an address from the Oval Office publicly calling for Siebert to be removed. Hours later, Siebert resigned. Trump rejected that assertion, saying that he had fired Siebert before he could resign. According to the Associated Press, Siebert was told to resign or be fired. The following day, the Department of Justice named insurance lawyer and former personal Trump attorney Lindsey Halligan as his interim successor. In November, a federal judge ruled Halligan's purported appointment as unlawful.

== Works cited ==
=== Articles ===
- "Cullen - Siebert". Richmond Times-Dispatch. April 10, 2005.
- Faulders, Katherine; Charalambous, Peter; Mallin, Alexander (September 19, 2025). "Trump poised to fire US attorney for resisting effort to charge NY AG Letitia James: Sources". ABC News.
- Green, Frank (April 14, 2012). "Man gets 16-year term in heroin case". Richmond Times-Dispatch.
- Marcus, Ruth (September 21, 2025). "Donald Trump's Firing of a Federal Prosecutor Crosses the Reddest of Lines". The New Yorker.
- Rizzo, Salvador; Stein, Perry; Roebuck, Jeremy (September 19, 2025). "Top Virginia prosecutor resigns amid criticism over Letitia James investigation". The Washington Post.
- Roebuck, Jeremy; Stein, Perry; Rizzo, Salvador (September 20, 2025). "Replacement named for Va. prosecutor ousted over probes of Trump foes". The Washington Post.
- Thrush, Glenn; Haberman, Maggie; Bromwich, Jonah; Feuer, Alan; Rashbaum, William (September 19, 2025). "U.S. Attorney Investigating Two Trump Foes Departs Amid Pressure From President". The New York Times.
- "U.S. Attorney hires two criminal prosecutors for Richmond office". The Progress-Index. November 29, 2010.
- Durkin Richer, Alanna; Tucker, Eric (September 20, 2025). "US attorney whose office is investigating Letitia James is told he's being removed, AP source says". The Minnesota Star Tribune. Associated Press.

=== Documents ===
- "Eric S Siebert in the U.S., Index to Public Records, 1994-2019" (Document). Index to Public Records.
