= Lindsey Halligan =

American attorney (born 1989)

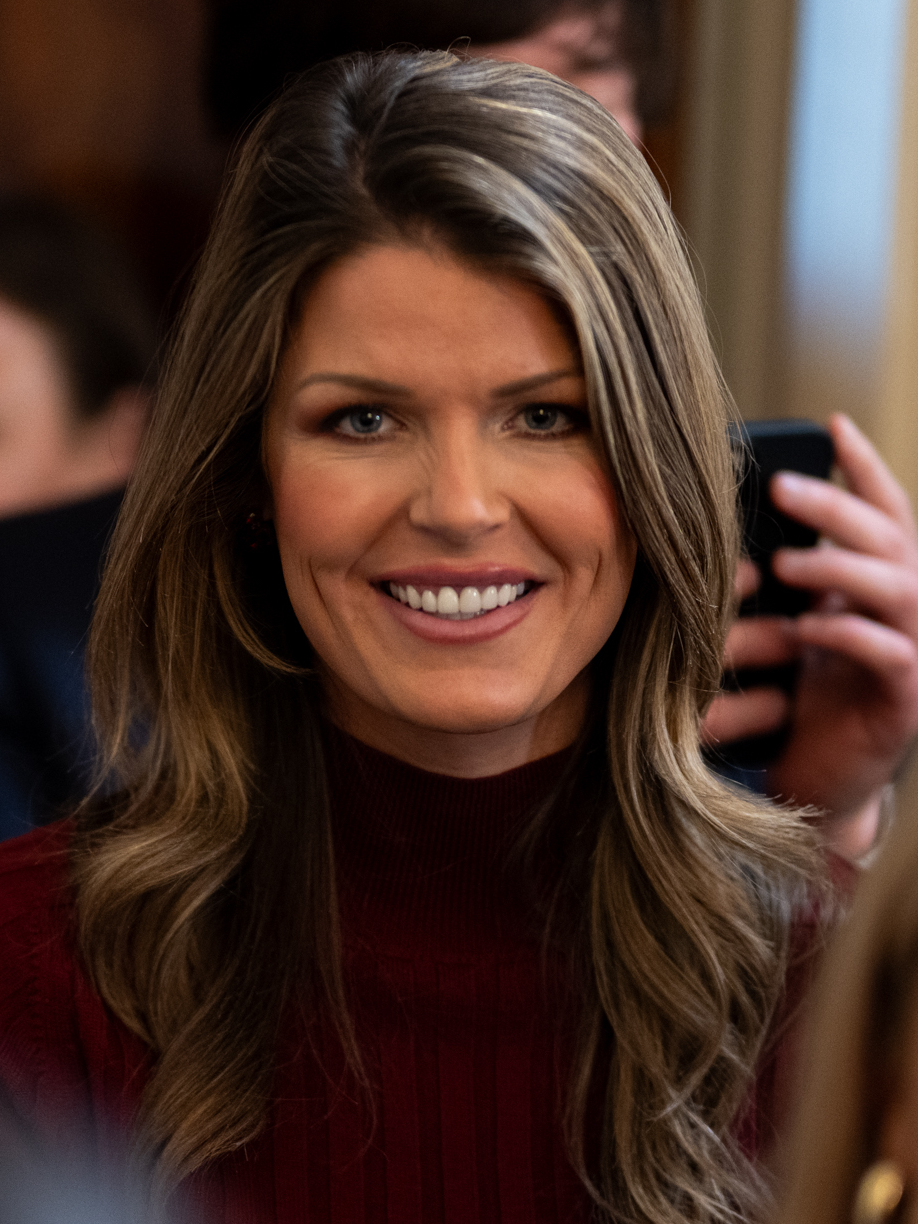
- Halligan in 2025

Interim United States Attorney for the Eastern District of Virginia
- De facto, disputed (Note: In November 2025, Judge Cameron McGowan Currie ruled that Halligan was illegally appointed as the interim United States attorney. The matter is on appeal.)
- In office September 22, 2025 – January 20, 2026
- President: Donald Trump
- Preceded by: Maggie Cleary

Personal details
- Born: Lindsey Halligan; 1989 (age 36–37) Portland, Maine, U.S.
- Education: Regis University (BA); University of Miami (JD)

Lindsey Halligan (born 1989) is an American attorney who was appointed as the United States attorney for the Eastern District of Virginia in September 2025. Her appointment was struck down as unlawful by a federal judge in November 2025 and she vacated the position in January 2026. She previously served as special assistant to the president and the White House senior associate staff secretary from January to September 2025.

Halligan graduated from Regis University and the University of Miami School of Law. She began working as an insurance lawyer and became a partner at Cole, Scott & Kissane in 2018. In 2022, then-former president Donald Trump named Halligan to his legal team. She was involved in litigation of the FBI's search of Mar-a-Lago. Halligan continued working with Trump on several other legal efforts.

In January 2025, Trump named Halligan as the White House senior associate staff secretary. She advocated for action against exhibits at Smithsonian Institution museums that she saw as disparaging the United States. In September, Trump forced the interim United States attorney for the Eastern District of Virginia, Erik Siebert, from his position over his handling of his office's investigations into Trump opponents. He named Halligan, who had no prosecutorial experience, as the interim U.S. attorney and nominated her for the position. In November, a judge ruled that Halligan's appointment had exceeded the temporary window established in the Federal Vacancies Reform Act. The Department of Justice appealed the ruling the following month. In January 2026, as judges sought to replace her, Halligan left the Department of Justice.

== Early life and education ==
Lindsey Halligan was born in 1989 in Portland, Maine. Halligan is the daughter of audiologists. Her sister, Gavin, is a family law attorney who unsuccessfully ran as a Republican in the 2016 election for the Colorado House of Representatives's fourth district. Halligan was raised in Broomfield, Colorado, and attended Holy Family High School, where she played softball and basketball. She graduated from Regis University with a bachelor's degree in politics and broadcast journalism and from the University of Miami School of Law with a Juris Doctor in 2013. At the University of Miami, Halligan interned for the Innocence Project and the Miami-Dade County public defender's office. She worked for Deco Models, a Miami modeling agency, in 2012. She competed in the Miss Colorado USA pageant in 2009 and 2010, reaching the semifinals and earning third runner-up, respectively.

== Career ==
=== Insurance law (2013–2022) ===
After graduating from law school, Halligan worked for Cole, Scott & Kissane, an insurance law firm specializing in residential and commercial properties. She became a partner in 2018. At Cole, Scott & Kissane, Halligan represented insurance companies against lawsuits filed by homeowners and corporate plaintiffs.

=== Trump legal work (2022–2025) ===
In November 2021, Halligan met former president Donald Trump at Trump International Golf Club, according to a statement she provided to The Washington Post. Trump named her to his legal team several months later amid the Federal Bureau of Investigation's investigation into his handling of government documents. Halligan told Politico that she was present at Mar-a-Lago for the Federal Bureau of Investigation's search of the property. She was involved in Trump v. United States, a lawsuit requesting a special master to review the material seized by the bureau in the search.

Halligan's work for Trump included a defamation lawsuit against CNN that was dismissed, an effort to defend his presidential eligibility amid legal contentions with the Fourteenth Amendment, and an attempt to dissuade the Department of Justice from indicting Trump over his handling of classified documents. Ahead of the 2024 presidential election, an Iranian hacking campaign targeted Trump advisors. The Islamic Revolutionary Guard Corps allegedly obtained emails from Halligan, among others, and threatened to release them in July 2025. Halligan reviewed draft executive orders, briefing materials, and press releases to identify "inconsistencies and potential legal risks".

=== White House positions (January–September 2025) ===
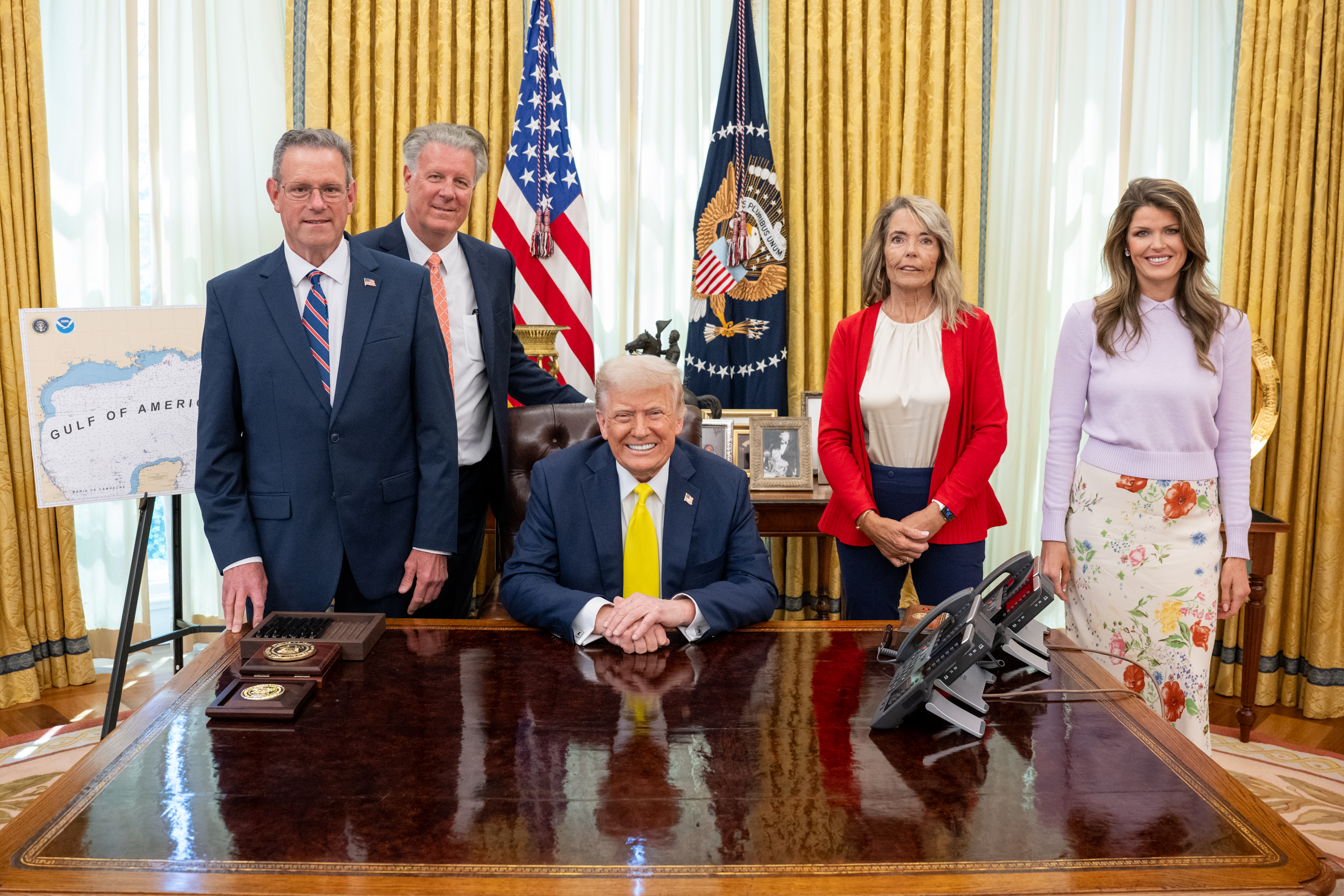
Halligan (far right) with Trump in April 2025.

After Trump's second inauguration, Halligan was appointed as the White House senior associate staff secretary, and special assistant to the president. She advocated for Trump to take action against exhibits at Smithsonian Institution museums that she saw as disparaging the United States. In March, Trump signed an executive order to review exhibits at the Smithsonian's museums, naming Halligan to lead the effort. She sought the removal of Amy Sherald's painting "Trans Forming Liberty", depicting a transgender African American woman as an approximation of the Statue of Liberty.

== Interim U.S. attorney for the Eastern District of Virginia (2025–2026) ==
=== Appointment and indictments ===
In September 2025, Erik Siebert, the U.S. attorney for the Eastern District of Virginia, resigned after refusing to bring criminal cases against either Letitia James, the attorney general of New York, or James Comey, the former director of the Federal Bureau of Investigation. After Siebert's dismissal, Boris Epshteyn, a Trump aide, approached Halligan about taking the position. On September 20, Trump announced that he would nominate Halligan—who had no prosecutorial experience—to succeed Siebert. According to The New York Times, Attorney General Pam Bondi and deputy attorney general Todd Blanche questioned her viability for the role given her lack of experience. Two days later, Halligan was sworn in as the interim U.S. attorney, though a court later ruled that Bondi lacked the authority to appoint U.S. attorneys.

Halligan intended to ask a grand jury to indict Comey, despite an internal memorandum arguing that she should not bring charges against him. On September 25, with only days remaining before the five-year statute of limitations would have expired, Halligan signed Comey's indictment. In October, Halligan obtained an indictment against James for alleged mortgage fraud. On October 20, Comey's attorneys filed a motion for dismissal, alleging that Halligan's interim appointment was carried out in violation of federal law.

As an interim U.S. attorney, Halligan emphasized a strict zero-tolerance policy on the unauthorized disclosure of sensitive information. In October 2025, Lawfare reporter Anna Bower published a Signal exchange, in which Halligan raised complaints about the media's coverage and characterization of the James indictment. Days later, James filed a request with the judge in charge of her case, seeking to bar federal prosecutors from speaking with the media about evidence in the case, arguing that this was needed in order to ensure a fair trial. At the end of that month, Attorney General Bondi retroactively appointed Halligan as a "special attorney" to dispel doubt about the legitimacy of Halligan's initial appointment as a federal prosecutor.

=== Removal and investigations ===
In November, a federal judge, Cameron McGowan Currie, heard Comey's and James's challenges to the legality of Halligan's appointment. Days later, a magistrate judge, William E. Fitzpatrick, found that Halligan may have committed misconduct by falsely stating that Comey did not have a Fifth Amendment right to refuse to testify at his trial. Fitzpatrick added that Halligan had told jurors that the Department of Justice had additional evidence that would be revealed at trial and noted the discrepancy between the indictment presented and the indictment approved by the grand jury. Halligan later told Judge Michael S. Nachmanoff that the foreperson in the grand jury proceedings for the Comey case had approved a second version of the indictment that had not been seen by the grand jury.

On November 24, Currie ruled that Halligan's appointment by Bondi was unlawful, as the Federal Vacancies Reform Act's temporary window had elapsed. The ruling resulted in Halligan's disqualification as U.S. attorney and the dismissal of the charges against Comey and James. The Trump administration stated its intention to appeal the ruling that day. Halligan continued serving as late as December, leading to criticism from other judges, who noted Currie's ruling. The Department of Justice appealed the ruling on December 19. In January 2026, Judge David J. Novak ordered Halligan to explain why she had claimed to be the interim U.S. attorney despite Currie's ruling. That month, she was renominated to the position.

On January 20, 2026, M. Hannah Lauck, the district's chief judge, issued separate orders escalating the dispute between Halligan and the judiciary. Lauck, who noted in her order that Halligan's 120-day appointment would have expired that day in the absence of Currie's ruling, directed the court's clerk to seek candidates for Halligan's position in local newspapers, setting a deadline for February. Hours later, Novak threatened disciplinary action for prosecutors who referred to Halligan as a U.S. attorney, describing the dispute as a "charade". According to The New York Times, prosecutors in the United States Attorney's Office for the Eastern District of Virginia were instructed to refer to Halligan as a special attorney instead. That day, Bondi announced Halligan had left the position. Days later, NBC News reported that Halligan had left the Department of Justice entirely.

In March 2026, the Florida Bar notified Halligan of an ongoing investigation into her conduct as the interim U.S. attorney for the Eastern District of Virginia, including allegations of dishonest conduct and knowingly making false statements. According to documents reviewed by The Washington Post, the inquiry into Halligan's actions was related to her role in the prosecutions of Comey and James. The following day, the association stated that it made a mistake with its prior statement, and that no pending investigation into Halligan existed. In September, the Department of Justice argued that Halligan was legally serving in the position before the Court of Appeals for the Fourth Circuit.
