= Timeline of the second Trump presidency (2025 Q3) =

The following is a timeline of the second presidency of Donald Trump during the third quarter of 2025, from July 1, 2025, to September 30, 2025. To navigate between quarters, see timeline of the Donald Trump presidencies. For the Q4 timeline see timeline of the second Trump presidency (2025 Q4).

== Timeline ==
=== July 2025 ===
| Date | Events | Photos/videos |
|---|---|---|
| Tuesday July 1 | Vice President JD Vance casts a tie-breaking vote to pass the amended One Big Beautiful Bill Act in the Senate. According to the non-partisan Congressional Budget Office, the bill will add $2.8 trillion to the national debt.; President Trump tours the South Florida Detention Facility nicknamed Alligator Alcatraz, a controversial new facility in the Florida Everglades. It would be opened days later.; UPenn bans a trans athlete from competing in swimming, settling a legal threat from the administration.; Jared Wise, a former FBI charged in connection with violence during January 6 is named an advisor to the Justice Department's so-called Weaponization Working Group. Wise repeatedly directed rioters attacking police to "Kill ’em! Kill ’em! Kill ’em!" | Vice President Vance casts a tie-breaking vote to pass the amended One Big Beautiful Bill Act in the Senate. President Trump tours the new detention facility nicknamed Alligator Alcatraz. |
| Wednesday July 2 | President Trump announces a 60-day ceasefire plan in Gaza. Neither Israel nor Hamas agree to the terms of the plan.; Paramount agrees to pay Trump $16 million for his presidential library to settle a lawsuit he personally filed against CBS. Many lawyers considered the suit to be baseless, leading lawmakers to question whether the decision was impacted by the FCC's pending approval of the company's planned merger with Skydance. | |
| Thursday July 3 | President Trump speaks with Russian President Vladimir Putin over the phone about the war in Ukraine. Trump tells reporters, "I didn’t make any progress with him at all."; President Trump falsely announces a trade deal with Vietnam setting tariffs on Vietnamese goods at 20%, which is double the rate that US importers are currently paying.; President Trump begins the year-long America 250 celebrations with a rally at the Iowa State Fairgrounds in Des Moines, Iowa. During his speech, he describes certain bankers as "Shylocks", later stating he did not realize the term was considered antisemtic.; Days before her confirmation hearing for an ambassadorship to Greece, Kimberly Guilfoyle instructs a donor to send $100,000 to her American Express account in order to avoid detection. | President Trump begins the year-long America 250 celebrations with a rally at the Iowa State Fairgrounds in Des Moines, Iowa. |
| Friday July 4 | President Trump signs the One Big Beautiful Bill Act into law at a ceremony at the White House during July 4 celebrations. The bill contains almost $4.5 trillion in tax cuts disproportionately benefiting corporations and the wealthy, and cuts nearly $1.1 trillion from healthcare and food programs for the poor and working-class. | President Trump signs the One Big Beautiful Bill Act into law. |
| Saturday July 5 | The previously apolitical Social Security Administration sends an email boasting about the One Big Beautiful Bill Act that critics, Democrats and former SSA officials call "a lie", "blatant misinformation", "unconscionable" and "a blatant political statement."; Because Homeland Security head Kristi Noem instituted a policy to personally review all expenses over $100,000, FEMA lays off hundreds of contract workers at call centers when contracts pending Noem's approval expire. Two days after severe flooding in Central Texas, two-thirds of the calls to FEMA's disaster assistance line go unanswered. | |
| Sunday July 6 | President Trump signs a disaster declaration for the Central Texas floods. | |
| Monday July 7 | Contradicting Pam Bondi's February 21 statement that the Epstein client list was on her desk, the DOJ now says no such list exists, and after a long review of Epstein evidence in the government's possession, no "further disclosure would be appropriate or warranted."; Trump announces a second delay of the "liberation day" tariffs, moving a deadline to negotiate separate trade deals with 90 nations to August 1st. To date, only two deals and one preliminary accord have been announced.; President Trump holds a bilateral meeting with Israeli Prime Minister Benjamin Netanyahu at the White House. | President Trump participates in a dinner with Israeli Prime Minister Benjamin Netanyahu. |
| Tuesday July 8 | President Trump holds a meeting with his cabinet. After fielding questions on Gaza, tariffs, and Jeffrey Epstein, Trump suddenly switches topics and spends fifteen minutes discussing the meeting room’s decorations.; The New York Times reports that the Department of Energy has hired three scientists well-known for denying the scientific consensus of climate change. | President Trump participates in a cabinet meeting. |
| Wednesday July 9 | President Trump holds a lunch meeting with South African leaders. During the meeting, Trump asks Liberian President Joseph Boakai, "Such good English. Where did you learn to speak so beautifully?" English is the official language of Liberia.; Newly unsealed court documents reveal that the Trump administration used the shadowy anonymous-run doxxing website Canary Mission to identify pro-Palestinian academics for deportation. The site has been dubbed a blacklist and drawn comparisons to McCarthyism. | President Trump holds a lunch meeting with South African leaders. He asks President Boakai where he learned to speak English at 15:45. |
| Thursday July 10 | Four people familiar with the matter tell Politico that, after Vietnam and the US agreed to an 11% tariff on their exports, Trump disregarded that number and announced a 20% tariff on social media, blindsiding and angering the Vietnamese government. | |
| Friday July 11 | President Trump and First Lady Melania Trump visit Kerrville, Texas to survey the damage and recovery efforts from the Central Texas floods.; Following the floods, Trump, Kristi Noem and administration aides appear to switch positions from completely eliminating the Federal Emergency Management Agency to reforming it. | President Trump participates in a roundtable with first responders and local officials in Texas. |
| Saturday July 12 | Trump posts on social media that the Epstein files the Department of Justice recently said would not be released were written by Barak Obama, Hillary Clinton, James Comey, John O. Brennan and members of the Biden administration.; Responding to her online criticism about the government's response to the Central Texas floods, Trump threatens to unconstitutionally nullify Rosie O'Donnell's citizenship. | |
| Sunday July 13 | President Trump attends the FIFA Club World Cup Final and presents the trophy. He is booed multiple times throughout the event, including during the national anthem and trophy presentation. | |
| Monday July 14 | President Trump holds a bilateral meeting with NATO Secretary General Mark Rutte at the White House as he teases to increase arms shipments.; The Department of Health and Human Services announces that more than 40 ice cream companies will voluntarily remove many artificial dyes. Companies will continue to use the dye titanium dioxide, a chemical that turns food white and is banned in the EU.; The Supreme Court allows President Trump to lay off more than 1300 employees at the Department of Education. | President Trump and NATO Secretary General Mark Rutte |
| Tuesday July 15 | President Trump joins an AI infrastructure summit in Pennsylvania.; President Trump announces a preliminary trade deal with Indonesia.; President Trump directs his Attorney General Pam Bondi to release "credible" Epstein files amid MAGA backlash. | President Trump at the AI infrastructure summit in Pennsylvania |
| Wednesday July 16 | The Trump administration pulls $4 billion of federal funding for California’s high-speed train project. The grant cancellation is one of the largest federal funding revocations in history.; President Trump meets with Crown Prince Salman bin Hamad of Bahrain at the White House.; President Trump has a dinner with the Prime Minister of Qatar.; President Trump signs the HALT Fentanyl Act into law.; Trump continues to disregard calls within the Republican party for the release of files related to the investigation of Jeffrey Epstein, posting "my PAST supporters have bought into this 'bullshit,' hook, line, and sinker." | President Trump and Crown Prince Salman bin Hamad of Bahrain President Trump signs the HALT Fentanyl Act into law. |
| Thursday July 17 | Trump, Vance, Todd Blanche and senior administration officials meet in the White House situation room to discuss damage control regarding the Epstein files.; President Trump denies a report from the Wall Street Journal saying he sent a bawdy letter featuring a sketch of a naked woman to Epstein for his birthday in 2003.; President Trump announces through his press secretary that he has a benign chronic venous insufficiency resulting in bruises on his hand and buildup in his legs.; The US House passes the GENIUS Act, the first bipartisan crypto investment bill.; The House approves a rescissions bill to cut $9 billion in federal funding for PBS, NPR and USAID. | Birthday letter to Jeffrey Epstein attributed to Donald Trump (text redacted due to potential copyright concerns) |
| Friday July 18 | President Trump signs the bipartisan cryptocurrency GENIUS Act into law.; Congress passes legislation to cut federal support for NPR, PBS and nearly $7 billion in foreign aid. | President Trump signs the GENIUS Act into law. |
| Saturday July 19 | In attempt to shift blame for withholding Epstein material away from the Trump administration and onto judges, the Department of Justice and Trump formally and publicly ask a federal judge to unseal grand jury testimony in the case of Jeffrey Epstein. The White House covertly believes the judge is unlikely to comply.; Trump files a $10 billion defamation lawsuit against Rupert Murdoch and the Wall Street Journal over the newspaper's reporting that Trump penned a sexually suggestive birthday greeting to Jeffrey Epstein claiming shared secrets. | |
| Sunday July 20 | Trump threatens to prevent the Washington Commanders from building a new football stadium unless the team reverts to their former name.; Trump reposts a fake AI-generated video depicting former President Barack Obama being arrested in the Oval Office and imprisoned, set to the Village People song "Y.M.C.A." | |
| Monday July 21 | White House press secretary Karoline Leavitt announces that The Wall Street Journal will be banned from the press pool during Trump's upcoming visit to Scotland, in retaliation for publishing a story on Trump's birthday card sent to Jeffrey Epstein.; A Washington Post analysis shows that the Trump administration has been accused of defying court orders in 57 cases, using tactics such as providing false information, failing to turn over evidence, and inventing pretexts to carry out blocked actions.; The Trump administration declassifies and releases more than 240,000 pages of records relating to the FBI surveillance of Martin Luther King Jr., over the objections of King's family and the civil rights group he led.; The U.S. Olympic and Paralympic Committee announces a ban on transgender women from competing in women's sports, stating they have an "obligation to comply" with a Trump administration executive order. | |
| Tuesday July 22 | President Trump holds a bilateral meeting with Filipino President Bongbong Marcos at the White House, during which he pushes 2016 election conspiracy theories and, without providing evidence, accuses President Barack Obama of treason.; The State Department announces that the United States will withdraw from UNESCO. | President Trump and Filipino President Bongbong Marcos |
| Wednesday July 23 | The Wall Street Journal reports that, weeks before announcing there would be no more disclosures or investigations, Pam Bondi and a deputy informed Trump that his name appears multiple times in the Epstein files.; President Trump unveils his AI Action plan, coupled with the launch of AI.gov.; Press Secretary Karoline Leavitt and Director of National Intelligence Tulsi Gabbard brief members of the media, alleging a "treasonous conspiracy" headed by President Barack Obama. Her conclusions are contradicted by a bipartisan Senate probe chaired by Marco Rubio.; The Justice Department creates a task force to investigate Gabbard's unsubstantiated allegations, which will become known as the "grand conspiracy" investigation.; On social media, Trump confirms receipt of the settlement payment in his lawsuit with CBS and adds "We also anticipate receiving $20 Million Dollars more from the new Owners" in the form of donated ad time. Paramount explicitly denies this is part of the settlement.; One day after Trump grants requests for FEMA assistance for West Virginia, Kentucky, Indiana and Michigan, all states Trump won in 2020, the White House denies disaster relief for heavy flooding in Maryland, a state Trump lost . Trump has previously threatened to deny disaster relief to political adversaries. | Press Secretary Leavitt and Director Gabbard brief members of the media. |
| Thursday July 24 | President Trump tours renovations underway in the Federal Reserve, and complains to press and Jerome Powell about cost overruns, citing questionable figures that Powell immediately refutes.; Portraitist Amy Sherald cancels a show at the National Portrait Gallery alleging that the Smithsonian discussed censoring the collection to please Trump. | President Trump tours the Federal Reserve. |
| Friday July 25 | Deputy Attorney General, and former Trump attorney Todd Blanche completes two days of meetings with Ghislaine Maxwell, but makes no statements about what was discussed.; In an interview on Newsmax, Trump refuses to rule out a pardon for Maxwell, saying "I’m allowed to do it." In the same interview he appears to rule out a pardon for Sean "Diddy" Combs because Combs did not support Trump's presidential campaign.; Darren Beattie, a speechwriter who was fired by the first Trump administration for attending a white supremacist gathering, is appointed acting president of the U.S. Institute of Peace.; President Trump travels to Scotland for meetings, which happen to coincide with the opening of a second Trump golf course in Aberdeen. | |
| Saturday July 26 | Trump plays golf at his own property in Scotland while protesters gather throughout the country including outside Trump's course in Aberdeen where a sign is defaced implying the property is "twinned with Epstein Island".; The Washington Post reports that DOGE is using new and untested AI technology to analyze federal regulations with the goal of eliminating half of the ones 200,000 currently mandated. | |
| Sunday July 27 | After finishing up a round of 18 holes with guests and family, President Trump holds a bilateral meeting with European Commission President Ursula von der Leyen at his golf course in Turnberry, Scotland. | President Trump and European Commission President Ursula von der Leyen |
| Monday July 28 | President Trump holds a bilateral meeting with British Prime Minister Keir Starmer at Trump's golf course in Turnberry. The President talks at length about his lavish upgrade to the course, before flying with the Prime Minister to a second Trump golf resort in Aberdeen.; President Trump tells Texas Republicans he wants them to create five additional GOP House seats via an unusual mid-decade redistricting. | President Trump and British Prime Minister Keir Starmer |
| Tuesday July 29 | Capping off a trip to Scotland largely centered around golf and the promotion of his own resorts, Trump ceremonially opens a new course at his resort in Aberdeen.; While speaking to reporters about Jeffrey Epstein, President Trump indicates that he had banned Epstein from Mar-a-Largo because he had "stolen" young women workers from the club.; Over the vehement objections of Senate Democrats, the Senate votes 50-49 to confirm Trump's personal attorney Emil Bove to a lifetime appointment as Federal appellate judge, despite whistleblower claims that he once suggested ignoring court orders. The whistleblower, former DOJ prosecutor Erez Reuveni, was not permitted to testify. | President Trump promotes the grand opening of a new course at his Scotland golf resort |
| Wednesday July 30 | | |
| Thursday July 31 | President Trump announces a $200M White House ballroom construction starting in September. Trump falsely claims "It won't interfere with the current building. It'll be near it but not touching it. And pays total respect to the existing building, which I'm the biggest fan of." | |

=== August 2025 ===
| Date | Events | Photos/videos |
|---|---|---|
| Friday August 1 | A week after meeting with Deputy Attorney General Todd Blanche, Ghislaine Maxwell is transferred from a federal prison in Florida to FCP Bryan, a minimum-security prison in Texas. The Bureau of Prisons declines to offer an explanation for unusual transfer.; President Trump fires Bureau of Labor Statistics commissioner Erika McEntarfer, alleging without evidence that she "rigged" an employment report showing slowing jobs growth in order to make Republicans and him "look bad."; After only a handful of the promised 90 countries completed a trade deal before an already extended deadline, Trump's reciprocal "Liberation Day" tarrifs go into effect, creating the highest effective tariff rate since the Great Depression and increasing costs to a typical household as much as $2,400 a year. | |
| Saturday August 2 | Trump calls for Federal Reserve officials to seize control from Fed chair Jerome Powell, if he does not cut interest rates. Trump's pressure campaign would continue, and is considered unprecedented in the history of the Federal Reserve. | |
| Sunday August 3 | | |
| Monday August 4 | Two victims of Jeffrey Epstein file letters with the court condemning the Justice Department’s handling of the matter. One of the victims accuses the Trump administration of only wanting to protect "wealthy men" whose names are in the files. | |
| Tuesday August 5 | Secretary of Health and anti-vaccine activist Robert F. Kennedy Jr cancels nearly $500 million of grants for research and development of mRNA vaccines, posting false and anti-scientific claims on social media. The move stuns and horrifies public health and biosecurity experts.; In an internal email, Immigration and Customs Enforcement announces cash bonuses of $200 for each immigrant deported within seven days of being arrested, a program that a former senior homeland security official calls "ungodly unethical." The program is abruptly cancelled shortly after the New York Times inquired about it. | |
| Wednesday August 6 | Apple Inc. announces additional $100 billion in US investment, and gifts President Trump a plaque with a 24K gold base in exchange for an exemption on a proposed 100% tariff on semiconductors.; The Guardian reports that Vice President JD Vance's team, had the army corps of engineers raise the water level of a lake in Ohio to accommodate a canoeing trip with his family. | |
| Thursday August 7 | President Trump orders federal law enforcement agencies to augment Washington, D.C. police after ex-DOGE staffer Edward "Big Balls" Coristine is assaulted by teens.; The FBI fires more top leaders who previously investigated President Trump or January 6 participants. | |
| Friday August 8 | President Trump participates in the signing ceremony of the peace agreement with Armenian Prime Minister Nikol Pashinyan and Azerbaijani President Ilham Aliyev at the White House, establishing the Trump Route for International Peace and Prosperity.; President Trump fires Billy Long, his fifth IRS Commissioner this term, after the IRS refuses to release confidential information on taxpayers the administration suspects of being in the US illegally.; The Smithsonian Institution changes the text describing Trump's second impeachment removing references to Trump's false statements about the 2020 election, and his incitement of the January 6 United States Capitol attack. | President Trump participates in signing a peace agreement between Armenia and Azerbaijan |
| Saturday August 9 | | |
| Sunday August 10 | | |
| Monday August 11 | President Trump holds a press conference, displaying a chart taken from social media and containing out of date and inaccurate information; Falsely alleging high rates of crime, Trump invokes section 740 of the District of Columbia Home Rule Act and deploys federal law enforcement agencies and the District of Columbia National Guard to the city .; Trump nominates Heritage Foundation economist and Project 2025 contributor E. J. Antoni to head the Bureau of Labor Statistics. Antoni is criticized from both the left and the right for his inexperience and partisanship | President Trump holds a press conference. |
| Tuesday August 12 | | |
| Wednesday August 13 | 20 armed federal agents in riot gear arrest Sean Dunn at his home, accusing him of throwing a sandwich at a federal agent. A video of Dunn hurling a Subway sandwich at a Customs and Border Protection agent had recently gone viral and Dunn's image had become an symbol of resistance. | |
| Thursday August 14 | | |
| Friday August 15 | President Trump and Russian President Vladimir Putin participate in the summit at Joint Base Elmendorf–Richardson in Anchorage, Alaska.; Following similar unconfirmed allegations against Trump rivals Adam Schiff and Letitia James, Federal Housing Finance Agency director Bill Pulte accuses Federal Reserve governor, Lisa Cook of mortgage fraud. Later, the Government Accountability Office would investigate Pulte himself over complaints of abusing his authority to punish Trump's enemies. | President Trump and Russian President Vladimir Putin in Anchorage, Alaska |
| Saturday August 16 | | |
| Sunday August 17 | | |
| Monday August 18 | President Trump holds a bilateral meeting with Ukrainian President Volodymyr Zelenskyy at the White House. They join with British Prime Minister Keir Starmer, Finnish President Alexander Stubb, French President Emmanuel Macron, German Chancellor Friedrich Merz, Italian Prime Minister Giorgia Meloni, European Union Commission President Ursula von der Leyen, and NATO Secretary General Mark Rutte.; President Trump speaks with Russian President Vladimir Putin over the phone. | President Trump and Ukrainian President Volodymyr Zelenskyy President Trump gathers with European leaders |
| Tuesday August 19 | On an interview on Fox & Friends, Trump expresses concern for the fate of his immortal soul, saying "I want to try and get to heaven, if possible. I’m hearing I’m not doing well. I am really at the bottom of the totem pole." | |
| Wednesday August 20 | Citing Bill Pulte's questionable and unproven fraud allegations as pretext, Trump threatens the independence of the Federal Reserve by demanding the resignation of Lisa Cook. She refuses the demand.; The US State Department announces sanctions against judges and prosecutors of the International Criminal Court. The ICC calls the move a "flagrant attack against the independence of an impartial judicial institution." | |
| Thursday August 21 | President Trump announces "America by Design", a national initiative to improve the design of government websites. As part of this effort, he created the National Design Studio and appointed Airbnb co-founder Joe Gebbia to serve as the first Chief Design Officer of the United States.; Vice President Vance delivers remarks at ALTA Refrigeration, Inc. in the state of Georgia. | Vice President Vance delivers remarks at ALTA Refrigeration, Inc. in the state of Georgia. |
| Friday August 22 | The FBI searches the home of former Trump administration National Security Advisor John Bolton, as part of a criminal investigation into possible mishandling of classified information. A similar investigation had previously closed a similar investigation.; Pete Hegseth fires Jeffrey Kruse, a three-star general who was heading the Defense Intelligence Agency, with no reason given. The firing comes weeks after the DIA drafted a report contradicting Trump’s false contention that the US "totally obliterated" Iran’s nuclear sites. | |
| Saturday August 23 | | |
| Sunday August 24 | | |
| Monday August 25 | President Trump holds a bilateral meeting with South Korean President Lee Jae Myung at the White House.; President Trump says he has fired Lisa Cook from the Federal Reserve Board of Governors, citing alleged mortgage fraud. Cook refuses to leave her post and files a lawsuit stating that Trump's firing is unprecedented and illegal. | President Trump and South Korean President Lee Jae Myung President Trump delivers remarks. |
| Tuesday August 26 | President Trump holds a lengthy televised cabinet meeting in which cabinet members took turns praising him. "Each one of these people spoke," Trump said, "If I thought one of them did badly, I would call that person out." | President Trump holds an unusual cabinet meeting. |
| Wednesday August 27 | Susan Monarez, director of the CDC (Centers for Disease Control and Prevention), is dismissed after being in office less than a month. A government spokesperson says that Monarez was not "in line with the president's agenda". Monarez says she was fired for refusing to "rubber-stamp unscientific, reckless directives and fire dedicated health experts." | |
| Thursday August 28 | Vice President Vance delivers remarks at Mid-City Steel. | Vice President Vance delivers remarks at Mid-City Steel. |
| Friday August 29 | President Trump announces the cancelation of former Vice President Kamala Harris' Secret Service detail.; President Trump unilaterally cancels $4.9 billion in foreign aid authorized by Congress to 15 international programs. | |
| Saturday August 30 | | |
| Sunday August 31 | | |

=== September 2025 ===
| Date | Events | Photos/videos |
|---|---|---|
| Monday September 1 | Nine former directors of the Centers for Disease Control publish an op-ed in the New York Times calling Secretary of Health Robert F. Kennedy "unqualified" and "dangerous" and saying he is "endangering every American's health."; World Liberty Financial, a new company founded and majority owned by Trump and his family,launches a cryptocurrency token which immediately adds approximately $5 billion to the family's asset value. Trump himself owns an unspecified amount of the digital token.; Over 1,000 Labor Day "Workers Over Billionaires" protests take place across the United States, calling for worker protections and the end of a range of Trump administration policies. | |
| Tuesday September 2 | District Judge Charles Breyer rules that Trump's National Guard deployments in Los Angeles violate the "Posse Comitatus Act," which prohibits the use of military for civilian law enforcement. Trump still threatens to send troops to Chicago.; President Trump announces that the U.S. Space Command headquarters will move to Huntsville, Alabama. | President Trump announces that the U.S. Space Command headquarters will move to Huntsville, Alabama. |
| Wednesday September 3 | President Trump holds a bilateral meeting with Polish President Karol Nawrocki at the White House.; Vice President Vance and his wife, Second Lady Usha Vance, visit the Annunciation Church in Minneapolis, Minnesota, where they meet with families of those affected by the shooting that happened a week prior.; After survivors of Jeffrey Epstein spoke on Capitol Hill and numerous politicians call for more transparency in the investigation, Trump calls the scandal a "Democrat hoax" while speaking on the issue. | President Trump and Polish President Karol Nawrocki |
| Thursday September 4 | | |
| Friday September 5 | Trump signs an executive order attempting to rename the Department of Defense and Secretary of Defense, "Department of War" and "Secretary of War." Since only Congress can officially rename these titles, they are used as secondary names.; Trump announces that he will host the 2026 G20 summit at the Trump National Doral golf resort. Trump previously backed down from hosting the 2020 G20 summit at the same location due to widespread pushback over ethical concerns.; Immigration officers arrest 475 people, including more than 300 South Koreans, at a construction site for a Hyundai and LG battery plant in Ellabell, Georgia. At least some of the detained workers were in the US legally on visa waiver, and the raid sparks an international incident with the government of South Korea. | Secretary of Defense Pete Hegseth finishes the installation of a Department of War plaque in front of the Department of Defense. |
| Saturday September 6 | President Trump posts an AI-generated picture mimicking Apocalypse Now featuring himself as the bloodthirsty antagonist Bill Killgore and threatening to deploy the National Guard and ICE into Chicago, Illinois. | |
| Sunday September 7 | President Trump attends the US Open final between Jannik Sinner and Carlos Alcaraz. During the competition Trump, who was attending as a guest of Rolex, is repeatedly booed and occasionally cheered. | |
| Monday September 8 | | |
| Tuesday September 9 | After the release of a sexually suggestive birthday letter signed by President Trump to Jeffrey Epstein by the House Oversight Committee, Press Secretary Karoline Leavitt denied his writing of the letter.; The New York Times reports that the Trump administration is quietly dismantling Biden-era crackdowns on tax shelters for multi-national corporations and the wealthy. Before being shutdown, the efforts were expected to raise $100 billion over ten years. | |
| Wednesday September 10 | Right-wing activist Charlie Kirk is assassinated while onstage at Utah Valley University (UVU) in Orem, Utah.; After a grand jury refused to indict him on felony assault charges for throwing a sandwich at a federal officer, prosecutors reduced the charge on Sean Dunn to a misdemeanor. He pleads not guilty in federal court. | President Trump delivers remarks on the incident. |
| Thursday September 11 | President Trump and First Lady Melania Trump lay a wreath at the September 11 Memorial at the Pentagon, and later pay tribute to the nearly three thousand Americans killed that day.; President Trump attends a baseball game between the New York Yankees and Detroit Tigers at Yankee Stadium, becoming the third sitting U.S. president to attend a Yankees game.; Ignoring longstanding precedent, Senate Republicans use the so-called "nuclear option" to break a Democratic blockade of Trump nominees.; After spending six days detained in an ICE facility Georgia, more than 300 South Koreans who were building a battery factory are released and immediately flee the country. Trump had allows workers the ability to stay to complete the factory, but only one chooses to stay. | President Trump speaks at the Pentagon on the 24th anniversary of 9/11 President Trump in the crowd at Yankee Stadium |
| Friday September 12 | Trump announced his intention of deploying National Guard troops to Memphis, Tennessee. | |
| Saturday September 13 | | |
| Sunday September 14 | | |
| Monday September 15 | Vice President Vance hosts The Charlie Kirk Show and calls for an effort to dox and harass people who have not sufficiently mourned the far-right activist.; Washington Post reporting reveals that the Trump administration has ordered several national parks, including Harper's Ferry and The President's House to remove signs and exhibits related to slavery.; During the opening monologue of his ABC talk show, Jimmy Kimmel criticizes the Trump administration's politicization of Charlie Kirk's death. Two days later, FCC chairman Brendan Carr threatens regulatory action against ABC for Kimmel's remarks. | Vice President Vance hosts The Charlie Kirk Show. |
| Tuesday September 16 | President Trump and First Lady Melania Trump travel to the United Kingdom aboard Air Force One for a two-day state visit. | President Trump gaggles with press before departing the White House |
| Wednesday September 17 | President Trump and First Lady Melania Trump meet with King Charles III and Queen Camilla at Windsor Castle for the first time since starting his second presidency. Their meeting makes Trump the second incumbent US president the King has met during his reign.; Hours after FCC chairman Brendan Carr threatens ABC for Jimmy Kimmel's Charlie Kirk comments, Nexstar Media Group and Sinclair Broadcast Group announce they are pulling Jimmy Kimmel Live! from their combined 66 ABC affiliate stations. ABC announces the show is suspended indefinitely. Trump celebrates the decision and advocates for the removal of other talk shows. | President Trump and First Lady Melania Trump with King Charles III and Queen Camilla at Windsor Castle |
| Thursday September 18 | | |
| Friday September 19 | The Senate confirms Mike Waltz as the Ambassador to the United Nations in a vote of 47–43.; The Pentagon announces that all reporters covering the Department of Defense must pledge to report only information authorized by the department, even unclassified information, or risk losing their press credentials. | |
| Saturday September 20 | | |
| Sunday September 21 | In a speech at the memorial service of Charlie Kirk, Trump says he disagrees with Kirk for wanting the best of his opponent. "I hate my opponent and I don't want the best for them," he says, adding: "I'm sorry, Erika." | |
| Monday September 22 | President Trump makes an announcement with United States Department of Health and Human Services Secretary Robert F. Kennedy Jr. falsely asserting that use of Paracetamol during pregnancy contributes to autism. The claims are deemed false by fact-checkers, the media, the American Academy of Pediatrics, the American College of Obstetricians and Gynecologists, the World Health Organization, and other health organizations.; President Trump signs an executive order designating Antifa as a domestic terrorist organization. It is unclear how the order will be implemented, owning to both antifa being a movement instead of a centralized organization, and the lack of federal authority to designate domestic terror groups. | President Trump makes an announcement with HHS Secretary Kennedy falsely asserting claims about the cause of autism. |
| Tuesday September 23 | President Trump addresses the United Nations General Assembly at the Headquarters of the United Nations. The speech begins with a teleprompter malfunction and ends with Trump falsely claiming he has ended seven wars.; President Trump holds a bilateral meeting with Ukrainian President Volodymyr Zelenskyy in New York City.; President Trump holds a bilateral meeting with French President Emmanuel Macron in New York City.; President Trump holds a bilateral meeting with Argentine President Javier Milei in New York City.; President Trump announces plans for his presidential library and center to be built at Miami Dade College.; Following a massive outpouring of criticism, Disney announces that Jimmy Kimmel's suspension would be lifted. Kimmel returns to the air, calling Carr's threat of FCC regulation "un-American", "dangerous", and "not a particularly intelligent threat to make in public". | President Trump and Ukrainian President Volodymyr Zelenskyy |
| Wednesday September 24 | Ahead of a potential government shut down, the White House issues directives to federal agencies to prepare for a mass reduction in the workforce. | |
| Thursday September 25 | President Trump holds a bilateral meeting with Turkish President Recep Tayyip Erdoğan at the White House.; President Trump holds a bilateral meeting with Pakistani Prime Minister Shehbaz Sharif at the White House.; President Trump issues a new round of tariffs including branded patented drugs, large trucks, and furniture, to be enacted in early October 2025.; The Department of Justice indicts former FBI director James Comey for alleged false statements and obstruction during the Senate Judiciary Committee in 2020. | President Trump and Turkish President Recep Tayyip Erdoğan President Trump signs executive orders |
| Friday September 26 | President Trump attends the 2025 Ryder Cup and makes comments about how his enemies will face prosecution. | President Trump gaggles with press before departing the White House |
| Saturday September 27 | President Trump deploys troops to Portland, Oregon falsely claiming the city was filled with "domestic terrorists" and inaccurately describing it as "war-ravaged".; Trump posts, and later deletes, an AI video of himself promoting "medbeds", a non-existent pseudoscientific cure-all medical device prominent in internet conspiracy theories. | Still from Trump's AI video promoting pseudoscientific disinformation. |
| Sunday September 28 | | |
| Monday September 29 | President Trump holds a bilateral meeting and joint press conference with Israeli Prime Minister Benjamin Netanyahu at the White House.; Trump posts an AI-generated video of House Minority Leader Hakim Jeffries wearing a sombrero with a large mustache overlaid on his face, while mariachi music plays. Hispanic groups call the video "racist", "dangerous" and reprehensible." | A Joint Press Conference between President Trump and Israeli Prime Minister Netanyahu |
| Tuesday September 30 | Secretary of Defense Pete Hegseth holds a meeting with Trump and hundreds of military leaders at the Marine Corps Base Quantico, during which he complains about beards, long hair and "fat troops" and attributes such standards to military failures in Iraq and Afghanistan. A defense official calls the meeting "embarrassing."; After Chuck Schumer and Hakeem Jeffries met with Trump to discuss a potential government shutdown, Trump posted an AI-generated video attacking Democratic politicians.; President Trump announces TrumpRX (a direct-to-consumer website for discounted medicine) and a deal with Pfizer to reduce the cost of many of its products.; The state of Florida approves President Trump's presidential library and center to be built at Miami Dade College.; Following the discovery of false claims and conspiracy theories posted on his X account, as well as photos of him attending the January 6th attack on the Capitol, the White House withdraws the nomination of Project 2025 contributor E.J. Antoni to head the Bureau of Labor Statistics. | President Trump delivers remarks to military leadership |

== See also ==
- First 100 days of the second Trump presidency – Period from January to April 2025
- List of executive actions by Donald Trump
- Lists of presidential trips made by Donald Trump (international trips)
- Second presidential transition of Donald Trump – Transfer of presidential power from Joe Biden to Donald Trump
- Timeline of the 2024 United States presidential election

U.S. presidential administration timelines
| Preceded by Second Trump presidency (2025 Q2) | Second Trump presidency (2025 Q3) | Succeeded by Second Trump presidency (2025 Q4) |
