= 2025 Washington, D.C. shooting =

2025 D.C. Shooting may refer to:

- 2025 killing of Israeli Embassy workers in Washington, D.C.
- 2025 Washington, D.C. National Guard shooting
