= Timeline of the second Trump presidency (2025 Q2) =

The following is a timeline of the second presidency of Donald Trump during the second quarter of 2025, from April 1, 2025, to June 30, 2025. To navigate between quarters, see timeline of the Donald Trump presidencies. For the Q3 timeline see timeline of the second Trump presidency (2025 Q3).

== Timeline ==
=== April 2025 ===
Date	Events	Photos/videos
Tuesday April 1	Senior officials at the National Institutes of Health, the Centers for Disease Control and Prevention, and the Food and Drug Administration as well as nearly 10,000 employees across the Department of Health and Human Services are fired in a widespread purge of government health programs.; First Lady Melania Trump delivers remarks at the 19th International Women of Courage Awards Ceremony.; Former Costa Rican President and Nobel Peace Prize winner Oscar Arias tells Reuters that his US visa had been revoked by the US State Department. Weeks earlier, Arias posted on social media that Trump had been acting like "a Roman emperor, telling the rest of the world what to do."; Senator Cory Booker concludes a 25 hour speech in protest of the Trump administration and the DOGE agency. The speech breaks the record for the longest in Senate history.	First Lady Melania Trump delivers remarks at the 19th International Women of Courage Awards Ceremony.
Wednesday April 2	In what he calls "Liberation Day", President Trump announces a baseline 10% universal tariff on all goods brought into the U.S. taking effect on April 5. He also announces that discounted reciprocal tariffs will take effect April 9.; Following DOJ official Emil Bove's decision to drop charges on New York City mayor Eric Adams, New York District Court judge Dale Ho dismisses the criminal charges against mayor Adams with prejudice, writing "Everything here smacks of a bargain: Dismissal of the indictment in exchange for immigration policy concessions." Judge Ho declines to order the dismissal without prejudice initially requested by the Department of Justice.; A senior official at the National Endowment for the Humanities says that millions of dollars of grants to state humanities councils, museums, historic sites, archives, libraries, educators and media outlets in all 50 states are being cancelled.	President Trump displays a chart detailing his "reciprocal tariff" policy.
Thursday April 3	Secretary Rubio travels to Brussels to attend the NATO Foreign Ministers Meeting.; One day after meeting with far-right conspiracy theorist Laura Loomer and viewing Loomer's opposition research questioning their loyalty, Trump fires six national security council staffers. Loomer later takes credit for the firings.	
Friday April 4	In the two days since Trump's announced tariffs, the Dow Jones index declines by 9.48%, the S&P loses 10%, and the Nasdaq loses 11%. Over $6.6 trillion is lost by end of day Friday – the largest two-day loss in history.; President Trump shares video footage of a U.S. military airstrike against the Houthi armed militia in Yemen.; Judge Paula Xinis orders the return of Kilmar Abrego Garcia, who was mistakenly deported to El Salvador. "This was an illegal act," Xinis said during a hearing. "Congress said you can’t do it, and you did it anyway."; Erez Reuveni, the Justice Department lawyer arguing in the Abrego Garcia case is fired for "failing to follow a directive" from superiors. Later, Reuveni would report that he was fired for refusing an order to falsely represent in court that Abrego Garcia is a terrorist. "I didn't sign up to lie," Renuveni claims he told his supervisor.	Video footage of the U.S. military airstrike against Houthi terrorists in Yemen
Saturday April 5	The Hands Off protests are held across the country in all 50 states. With the support of over 150 progressive groups, millions of demonstrators protest a wide range of the Trump administration's policies.	Hands Off protesters in Washington, D.C.
Sunday April 6		
Monday April 7	President Trump holds a bilateral meeting with Israeli prime minister Benjamin Netanyahu at the White House.; A written request from Immigration and Customs Enforcement says that the Trump administration plans to spend $45 billion on new immigrant detention facilities and other services.; President Trump hosts the Los Angeles Dodgers at the White House to celebrate their victory in the 2024 World Series.	President Trump and Israeli prime minister Benjamin Netanyahu
Tuesday April 8	The day before announcing a tariff pause, Trump personally purchases worth as much as $12.8 million from companies such as Apple, Microsoft, Nvidia, and Amazon, prompting concerns of "insider trading."; Judge Trevor N. McFadden granted an injunction saying the administration must cease banning the Associate Press from the White House Press pool, but stayed the injunction pending appeal.	
Wednesday April 9	President Trump announces on Truth Social that reciprocal tariffs above 10%, which had gone into effect that morning, will be paused for 90 days for all countries except China; China's minimum tariff rate will instead be increased to 145%.; President Trump issues executive orders revoking the security clearances of former CISA Director Chris Krebs and former DHS Chief of Staff Miles Taylor, and further directs the Attorney General and Director of National Intelligence to suspend the security clearances of any "individuals at entities associated with" Krebs and Taylor.; President Trump hosts the North Dakota State Bison football team at the White House for their victory in the 2025 NCAA Division I Football Championship Game.	President Trump with the North Dakota State Bison in the East Room.
Thursday April 10	The Supreme Court orders the government to ‘facilitate’ Kilmar Abrego Garcia’s return from prison in El Salvador, where he had been deported to by mistake. The Trump administration admitted the error, but had argued they had no power to assist in his return.	
Friday April 11	President Trump traveled to the METU Suite of Walter Reed National Military Medical Center in Bethesda, Maryland, for his annual physical examination.; The Trump administration sends a letter to Alan Garber, president of Harvard, threatening to cut billions in federal funding unless the university agrees to a series of government demanded policy changes including auditing the viewpoints of student body, faculty, and staff.; White House trade advisor and convicted criminal Peter Navarro says on Fox Business that the White House aims to complete 90 trade deals in the next 90 days. The administration would not come anywhere close to achieving this goal.; The Senate confirms Dan Caine as the 22nd Chairman of the Joint Chiefs of Staff in a vote of 60–25.; The University of Michigan Consumer Sentiment Index falls to its second-lowest level in history.	President Trump traveled to the METU Suite of Walter Reed National Military Medical Center in Bethesda, Maryland, for his annual physical examination.
Saturday April 12	President Trump and Secretary Rubio attend UFC 314 at the Kaseya Center in Miami.	President Trump and Secretary Rubio attend UFC 314 at the Kaseya Center in Miami.
Sunday April 13	The Washington Post reports that just days before Tufts student Rumeysa Ozturk's detention, the State Department determined that no evidence existed that she participated in antisemitic activities or supported a terrorist organization, which the government alleged as the reason for her deportation.; During an interview on 60 Minutes, Volodymyr Zelenskyy says some US officials are falling for Russian disinformation. "I believe, sadly, Russian narratives are prevailing in the US." he tells Scott Pelley, singling out Vice President Vance as someone "somehow justifying Putin’s actions."	
Monday April 14	President Trump holds a White House meeting with Salvadoran President Nayib Bukele in which Bukele said he would not return the mistakenly deported Kilmar Abrego Garcia. Trump directed questions to Pam Bondi and Marco Rubio, who repeated that the decision is up to El Salvador.; President Trump and Vice President Vance host the Ohio State Buckeyes football team at the White House to celebrate their victory in the 2025 College Football Playoff National Championship.; Harvard University president Alan Garber issues a statement refusing to comply with the Trump administration's demands regarding hiring, admission and curriculum. In response, the administration moves to freeze $2.2 billion in medical research grants to the university.	President Trump and Salvadoran President Nayib Bukele
Tuesday April 15	Trump posts a threat on social media to remove Harvard University's tax exempt status on ideological grounds. Federal law prohibits the president from ordering the IRS to conduct tax investigations.	
Wednesday April 16	Judge James Boasberg rules that there is "probable cause" to hold the Trump administration in criminal contempt for violating an order to pause deportations under the Alien Enemies Act.; Under the new leadership of Trump appointee Russell Vought, the Consumer Financial Protection Bureau eliminates a Biden-era $8 limit on credit card late fees. Vought has also scuttled over a dozen CFPB enforcement actions against banks and lenders.	
Thursday April 17	President Trump holds a bilateral meeting with Italian prime minister Giorgia Meloni at the White House.; Secretary Rubio and Special Envoy Steve Witkoff travel to Paris to meet with French president Emmanuel Macron.; The Trump administration tells the Consumer Finance Protection Bureau it is laying off 90% of the agency's staff. The staff immediately file a lawsuit, and note that Elon Musk, who is overseeing the government's cuts, proposed mobile payments on X which would be regulated by the agency.; Treasury Secretary Scott Bessent and Elon Musk get into a profanity-laden shouting match in a West Wing hallway. Bessent accuses Musk of bragging about and then under-delivering budget cuts with DOGE, and Musk calls Bessent a "Soros agent."	President Trump and Italian prime minister Giorgia Meloni
Friday April 18	The official White House account on X posts that Kilmar Abrego Garcia is "never coming back."	
Saturday April 19	Vice President Vance meets with Vatican Secretary of State Cardinal Pietro, and has what the Vatican describes as an "exchange of opinions" of recent international events, "with particular attention to migrants, refugees, and prisoners."; On the anniversary of the Battles of Lexington and Concord, the 50501 movement holds what they call "Day of Action" protests in more than 600 locations around the nation.	Day of Action protest, Portland, ME.
Sunday April 20	On Easter Sunday, Trump posts an attack on what he called "Radical Left Lunatics", "weak and ineffective Judges" and "Sleepy Joe Biden" before repeating falsehoods about the 2020 election.; The New York Times reports that, in addition to a well-reported leak via Signal, Pete Hegseth also shared private and sensitive information about forthcoming strikes in Yemen on a second Signal group with his wife, brother and personal lawyer.	
Monday April 21	President Trump pays tribute to Pope Francis after his death on this day.; President Trump and First Lady Melania Trump host the White House Easter Egg Roll. Traditionally sponsored by the American Egg Board to avoid advertising on White House grounds, this year's event is sponsored by corporations including Amazon, YouTube and Meta.; Harvard sues the Trump administration over its threats to billions of dollars in federal funding. The administration had cited student protests over Gaza, which it classified as antisemitism, as a reason to pull funds.	President Trump and First Lady Melania Trump host the White House Easter Egg Roll.
Tuesday April 22	Speaking to reporters in the Oval Office, Trump states that undocumented immigrants should not be entitled to trials, insisting that his administration ought to have the power to deport people without ever appearing before a judge.	
Wednesday April 23	A dozen states sue Trump over his "Liberation Day" tariffs saying they represent his "whims rather than the sound exercise of lawful authority."; Trump and aides demand that Ukraine agree to a proposal that would allow Russia to keep all the territory it has gained in the Ukraine Russia War. Ukrainian president Volodymyr Zelenskyy rejects the proposal saying "There is nothing to talk about. This violated our Constitution. This is our territory."	
Thursday April 24	President Trump holds a bilateral meeting with Norwegian prime minister Jonas Gahr Støre at the White House.	President Trump and Norwegian prime minister Jonas Gahr Støre
Friday April 25	The FBI arrests Milwaukee County judge Hannah Dugan for allegedly obstructing federal agents from arresting an undocumented immigrant after he appeared in court before her. Dugan had noted the agents had an administrative rather that a judicial warrant and directed the man in question through a juror door and out of the court room.; In what could be a violation of DOJ policy, FBI director Kash Patel posts an image of Judge Dugan's perp walk on social media.	
Saturday April 26	President Trump attends the funeral of Pope Francis at St. Peter's Square. Ignoring the dress code requested by the Vatican for black attire, Trump wears a blue suit to the event.; President Trump and Ukrainian president Volodymyr Zelenskyy meet in Rome, the first time they have met since their Oval Office meeting two months prior.	President Donald Trump wearing blue and First Lady Melania Trump wearing black at the funeral Mass for Pope Francis President Trump and Ukrainian President Volodymyr Zelenskyy
Sunday April 27	An ABC News/Washington Post/Ipsos poll reveals that Trump's approval rating at the 100-day mark is the lowest at that point of all presidents in the past 80 years. A CNN poll shows similar results, noticing Trump's approval at the lowest 100 day rating for any president at going back at least to Dwight Eisenhower.	
Monday April 28	Hundreds of lawyers and staffers resign their positions at the Justice Department's civil rights division after being ordered to drop the agency's usual work and instead aggressively pursue cases against Ivy League schools and liberal cities.; President Trump hosts the Philadelphia Eagles at the White House to celebrate their victory in Super Bowl LIX. Multiple players, including quarterback Jalen Hurts, decline to attend the event.	President Trump with the Philadelphia Eagles on the South Lawn
Tuesday April 29	Calling the program a "woke divisive/social justice/Biden initiative" Pete Hegseth brags about eliminating the Women, Peace, & Security program, an initiative to increase women's participation in national security. The program was launched by a bill co-sponsored by Kristi Noem and Marco Rubio, and signed into law by Trump in 2017.; President Trump holds a rally in Warren, Michigan, to mark the first 100 days of his administration. He presents a video of prisoners flown to El Salvador, having their heads shaved and roughly marched to prison cells, to cheers of the crowd.	
Wednesday April 30	U.S. Treasury Secretary Scott Bessent and Ukrainian first deputy prime minister Yulia Svyrydenko sign the Ukraine–United States Mineral Resources Agreement.; The Trump administration begins firing Biden appointees on the board of the U.S. Holocaust Memorial Museum. Critics say the firings are unprecedented and hurt the museum's nonpartisan work.; The Trump Organization signs a new real estate and Trump Golf Course deal with the government of Qatar.; Wired reports that DOGE hired a college junior with no experience in government and tasked him to use AI to rewrite rules and regulations at the Department of Housing and Urban Development. The undergraduate was given access to HUD's data and income verification systems.; During a televised cabinet meeting, Attorney General Pam Bondi falsely claims that the amount of fentanyl seized by the DOJ has "saved 258 million lives", which would be 75% of the US population. Following Bondi's logic, at that rate, in only one more month, Trump's Justice department will have saved every single American from a fatal drug overdose.	

=== May 2025 ===
Date	Events	Photos/videos
Thursday May 1	President Trump removes Michael Waltz as the national security adviser and nominates him to be ambassador to the United Nations instead. Trump names Secretary of State Marco Rubio to serve as interim adviser.; President Trump issues an executive order requiring the Corporation for Public Broadcasting to end direct and indirect funding to NPR and PBS to the extent allowed by law.; President Trump meets with Polish presidential candidate Karol Nawrocki.; The New York Times reports that the Trump administration has deported Bhutanese refugees who were residing in the court legally under a George W. Bush humanitarian program. The refugees were not admitted back in Bhutan, where they are no longer citizens and their whereabouts are unclear.; Trump's cryptocurrency firm World Liberty Financial announces that an Abu Dhabi investment firm backed by the United Arab Emirates is investing $2 billion in one of its coins.; May Day protests against the Trump administration take place in over 1,000 cities in the United States, France, Germany, Italy, Japan, Manila, and Taipei.	President Trump and Polish presidential candidate Karol Nawrocki May Day 2025 protest in Seattle.
Friday May 2	As a conclave to elect a successor to the late Pope Francis is about to begin, Trump posts, and the White House reposts, an AI generated image of himself as Pope. The post elicits widespread criticism including from the New York State Catholic Conference which states "There is nothing clever or funny about this image, Mr. President." And "do not mock us."; The White House proposes a budget that would increase defense spending 13% to total of $1 trillion, and cut $163 billion from non-defense spending including funds for foreign affairs, national parks, climate and science research, health care programs, and education.; Five former directors of the National Weather Service write an open letter warning that recent cuts to the agency could lead to "needless loss of life."; In an opinion piece for the Financial Times, columnist Robert Armstrong coins the term "TACO", an acronym for "Trump Always Chickens Out". The term refers to a pattern of Trump boldly announcing something, such as tariffs, only to backpedal later when markets react poorly.	Artificial Intelligence image created by Donald Trump, published on his Truth Social profile
Saturday May 3	The National Endowment for the Arts sends a mass email terminating grants to numerous arts organizations around the nation.	
Sunday May 4	President Trump proposes the reopening of Alcatraz Federal Penitentiary for "America's most ruthless and violent offenders".; Former leader of the violent Neo-fascist organization the Proud Boys, Enrique Tarrio visits Trump at his Mar-a-Lago home. Tarrio thanks Trump for pardoning his 22-year prison sentence for seditious conspiracy and several other charges stemming from his leadership role in the January 6th attack on the US Capitol.; During an interview on Meet the Press, Trump answers a question about whether everyone in the US is entitled to due process with "I don't know. I'm not, I'm not a lawyer. I don't know." Later in the interview, when asked if the President has to uphold the United States Constitution, Trump also replies, "I don't know."	
Monday May 5	The Department of Homeland Security announces a new program which offers $1,000 to undocumented immigrants in the US if they agree to self-deport.	
Tuesday May 6	President Trump holds a bilateral meeting with Canadian prime minister Mark Carney at the White House. Carney shuts down talk about Canada becoming the 51st US State, saying “It’s not for sale. It won’t be for sale ever." In his reply, Trump says "never say never."; President Trump announces a ceasefire deal with the Houthis, ending the US–UK airstrikes on Yemen that began in January 2024.	President Trump and Canadian prime minister Mark Carney
Wednesday May 7	Kari Lake, acting as a senior advisor to the United States Agency for Global Media, announces that One America News will provide news coverage for Voice of America. One America News is a far-right, pro-Trump network which has promoted conspiracy theories about election fraud and the 2020 election.; Replacing those he unprecedentedly fired in April, Trump names five new members to the U.S. Holocaust Memorial Council, including Siggy Flicker, a podcaster and influencer who starred in The Real Housewives of New Jersey.; One day before her confirmation hearing at the Senate, Trump rescinds his nomination of Dr. Janette Nesheiwat to be U.S. surgeon general. He does so at the recommendation of far-right conspiracy theorist Laura Loomer, who criticized her for being pro-vaccine.; Soon after rescinding Newsheiwat's nomination for surgeon general, Trump announces he is nominating MAHA wellness influencer Casey Means for the position, noting that he does not know her and is doing so at the recommendation of Robert Kennedy Jr.. Means graduated from Stanford School of Medicine, though she not board-certified, and does not have an active medical license. Her nomination will be stalled in congress for almost year before being withdrawn.	
Thursday May 8	U.S. Secretary of Defense Pete Hegseth issued the memorandum that individuals with a current diagnosis or history of gender dysphoria (GD), or who exhibit symptoms consistent with GD, are not considered fit for military service. Service members affected by the policy were given the option to voluntarily separate—with deadlines of June 6, 2025, for active duty and July 7, 2025, for reservists—after which involuntary separation procedures would begin. Up to 1,000 transgender troops began voluntary separation from the military.; President Trump and Vice President Vance congratulate Robert Francis Prevost on being elected Pope Leo XIV. Trump said it was a "surprise" and a "great honor".; Caving to Republican criticism, Trump says he will replace Ed Martin, his nominee for the US attorney for the District of Columbia. Martin is a Stop the Steal activist with no previous experience as a trial lawyer or prosecutor.	
Friday May 9	Speaking with media outside the White House, Deputy Chief of Staff Stephen Miller says that suspending Habeas corpus is an option the Trump administration is "actively looking at."; Trump orders the Department of Homeland Security to add at least 20,000 officers to help execute his mass deportation policies. His order did not specify how the staff increase would be funded.; Trump fires Librarian of Congress Carla Hayden after the conservative opposition research group American Accountability Foundation accused her of being "woke" and "anti-Trump."	
Saturday May 10	The day after her office released a report that included concerns about Artificial Intelligence and its use of copyrighted materials, the Trump administration fires Shira Perlmutter, the US Register of Copyrights. Perlmutter successfully sues and remained in the position, which is overseen by Congress, not the President.	
Sunday May 11		
Monday May 12	To replace the Librarian of Congress abruptly fired last Friday, Trump appoints his former defense attorney Todd Blanche to the position in an acting capacity. Despite showing no prior experience working in libraries or archives, Blanche is now running the world's largest.; Dozens of white South Africans enter to the United States after being granted refugee status by the Trump administration earlier in the year. Afrikaners, the white minority that ruled during South African apartheid, are the only group the Trump administration has allowed refugee status.	
Tuesday May 13	House Republicans unveil a bill containing at least $4.9 trillion in tax cuts, to be partly paid for with cuts to Medicaid, food stamps and green energy programs. Named the One Big Beautiful Bill Act, the plan would reduce the number of people with health care by 8.6 million according to the nonpartisan Congressional Budget Office.; President Trump arrives at the King Khalid International Airport in Saudi Arabia and meets with Saudi Crown Prince Mohammed bin Salman. They sign a strategic economic partnership agreement addressing energy, defense and other issues.; President Trump announces that the United States will lift all sanctions imposed on Syria under the previous regime of President Bashar al-Assad and expresses willingness to work with the Syrian transitional government.; Trump orders federal agencies stop using the longstanding legal tool known as "disparate-impact liability" a measurement of practices that adversely affect one group of people, and a core component of civil rights legislation.	President Trump participates in a signing ceremony and an exchange of agreements in Saudi Arabia.
Wednesday May 14	President Trump attends the GCC Summit. During a meeting, Trump attacks former President Joe Biden and the White House press corp and falsely claims the 2020 election was “rigged".; President Trump arrives at the Hamad International Airport in Qatar and meets with Emir Tamim bin Hamad Al Thani. His motorcade is escorted with red Tesla Cybertruck vehicles. During the trip, he announces a deal to acquire around 160 Boeing jets from Qatar Airways.; After a meeting in Riyadh, Trump praises new Syria President Ahmed al-Sharaa, calling him "great" and an "young, attractive, tough guy." al-Sharaa is a former al-Qaeda insurgent who was once imprisoned in Abu Ghraib. The United States designated his group a terrorist organization and only five months ago, had a $10 million bounty for his arrest.; During a congressional hearing on vaccines, Secretary of Heath and Human Services Robert Kennedy, Jr. dodges a question saying "I don’t think people should be taking medical advice from me."	President Trump participates in a signing ceremony and an exchange of agreements in Qatar.
Thursday May 15	During a business roundtable in Qatar, Trump proposes the United States take over Gaza.; President Trump arrives at the Abu Dhabi International Airport in the United Arab Emirates and meets with President Mohamed bin Zayed Al Nahyan.; Secretary Rubio travels to Turkey to attend the NATO Informal Foreign Ministers Meeting. He also meets with Syrian foreign minister Asaad al-Shaibani in Antalya.; Seeking to comply with Trump's order to add 20,000 officers to Department of Homeland Security deportation forces, DHS requests the Pentagon provide the agency with 20,000 National Guard members.	
Friday May 16	Specifically citing debt risk from the proposed tax cuts in the upcoming One Big Beautiful Bill Act, the rating agency Moody's downgrades the United States credit rating one notch below AAA, becoming the third out of three major credit rating agencies to do so.; Acknowledging the difficulty of negotiating trade deals with more than 50 nations at once by a self-imposed deadline of July 9, the White House says the US will just send letters to countries telling them what the tariffs will be.; Department of Homeland Security spokesperson Tricia McLaughlin confirms reporting that the agency is considering participating in a proposed reality television show in which immigrants would perform a series of challenges competing to receive American citizenship.	
Saturday May 17	Responding to Walmart's warning that prices on many goods could increase due to Trump's tariffs, Trump attacks the retailer on social media saying the company should "eat the tariffs."	
Sunday May 18	Vice President Vance and Secretary Rubio attend the papal inauguration of Pope Leo XIV in the Vatican City.	
Monday May 19	President Trump speaks with Russian president Vladimir Putin over the phone.; President Trump signs the TAKE IT DOWN Act into law.; The Washington Post reports that the Trump administration has settled a wrongful-death lawsuit with the family of Ashli Babbitt for $4.975 million. Previously, a Capitol Police investigation cleared the officer who did the shooting, and the Department of Justice found that Babbitt’s civil rights had not been violated. U.S. Capitol Police sends a statement condemning the settlement.	President Trump signs the TAKE IT DOWN Act into law.
Tuesday May 20	When asked in a congressional hearing to define the right of habeas corpus, Homeland Security Secretary Kristi Noem incorrectly answers that the longstanding right to challenge detention by the government was instead the president's constitutional right to remove people from the country.	
Wednesday May 21	The Department of Defense accepts a Boeing 747-8 jumbo jet worth $400 million, as a gift from the royal family of Qatar, to be used as Air Force One. Later reporting reveals that people close to President Trump asked the Qataris to gift them the jet.; President Trump holds a bilateral meeting with South African president Cyril Ramaphosa at the White House. During the meeting, Trump confronts the South African president with a baseless conspiracy theory and presents video footage and a photo with claims that the BBC and Reuters fact-check as false.; ICE arrests a 20-year old Venezuelan Bronx high school student later identified as Dylan Lopez Contreras who is legally in the US awaiting his asylum decision. He is arrested attending a mandatory hearing at an immigration courthouse in New York.; President Trump hosts the Florida Gators men's basketball team at the White House for their victory in the 2025 NCAA Division I men's basketball tournament.	President Trump and South African President Cyril Ramaphosa
Thursday May 22	The Make America Healthy Again Commission releases the 78-page Make Our Children Healthy Again Assessment. The document draws attention for the alleged use of artificial intelligence in its creation.; The Trump administration revokes Harvard University’s ability to enroll international students an action that is quickly blocked by a federal judge.; Trump holds a gala dinner at his private golf club for the largest holders of $Trump, his personal cryptocurrency coin. The top 25 holders are also invited to a “Private VIP Reception” with the president. Though the White House insists Trump is attending the event "in his personal time", he speaks behind a lectern bearing the presidential seal.	
Friday May 23	Trump signs a series of executive orders aiming to reform the Nuclear Regulatory Commission. The order contains language to "adopt science-based radiation limits" and orders to the NRC to "reconsider reliance on the linear no-threshold (LNT) model for radiation exposure."	
Saturday May 24	President Trump delivers the commencement address to the 2025 graduating class of the United States Military Academy during a ceremony at Michie Stadium in West Point, New York. His speech veers into a campaign-style event, featuring political boasts and Trump's long-held grievances. Vice President Vance also participates.	President Trump addresses the Army Academy's Class of 2025. Vice President Vance addresses the Army Academy's Class of 2025.
Sunday May 25	Discussing a recent partnership between US Steel and Japan, Trump mistakenly referrers to Japanese steel company Nippon as "Nissan" the Japanese automobile manufacturer.	
Monday May 26	President Trump performs a wreath-laying ceremony at the Tomb of the Unknown Soldier at the Arlington National Cemetery and delivers a Memorial Day address.; In a post that begins "Happy Memorial Day", Trump posts false immigration data and attacks Joe Biden, federal judges and his political enemies.; President Trump calls Russian president Vladimir Putin "absolutely crazy" for continuing assaults on Ukraine in the middle of peace negotiations. Kremlin replies Trump is "emotional".	President Trump, Vice President Vance and Secretary Hegseth at Arlington National Cemetery
Tuesday May 27	Secretary of Health and vaccine skeptic Robert Kennedy Jr announces that the Centers for Disease Control and Prevention will drop the longstanding recommendation that the Covid-19 vaccine be offered to all children and pregnant women. The vaccine will be made available to those groups, and American Academy of Pediatrics, the American College of Obstetricians and Gynecologists, the American Academy of Family Physicians and the Infectious Diseases Society of America continue to recommend it for children and pregnant women.; The New York Times reports that Trump's pardon of convicted tax cheat Paul Walczak was issued soon after Walczak's mother, Elizabeth Fago, attended a $1-million-per-person fund-raising dinner with the president at his Mar-a-Lago home. Trump's pardon spares Walczak from serving 18 months in prison and paying $4.4 million in restitution.	
Wednesday May 28	The US Court of Trade blocks most of the administration's tariffs; Elon Musk exits DOGE to return to the private sector. Musk claims, without providing details, that DOGE will likely save taxpayers only $150 billion, far less than the $1 trillion he promised to save.; President Trump's administration freezes VISA applications and pauses foreign student enrollments at Harvard.; Secretary of State Marco Rubio announces that the US will begin "aggressively" revoking visas of Chinese students. China decries the move as being done "unjustifiably" and "under the pretext of ideology and national security."; Trump issues over two dozen pardons to individuals including a former gang leader convicted of murder, two reality television stars, and several Republican lawmakers. Days previously, Ed Martin, the Trump adviser overseeing pardons, posted "No MAGA left behind" on social media.	
Thursday May 29	Citing how successful she had been on television, Trump swears in Fox News personality Jeanine Pirro as US Attorney for the District of Columbia. Pirro has not worked as a prosecutor in the last twenty years.	
Friday May 30	President Trump participates in a press conference with Elon Musk.; President Trump delivers remarks on U.S. steel deal in West Mifflin, Pennsylvania announcing he will double steel tariffs to 50%, potentially driving up prices for materials used to make houses, cars and other goods.; The Texas Tribune and ProPublica reports that Homeland Security data shows the Trump administration was aware that the majority of the 238 Venezuelan immigrants deported to a prison in El Salvador had not been convicted of crimes, contradicting official statements saying that they had and were "the worst of the worst." The reporting shows that Trump officials were aware that only 32 of those deported had been convicted of U.S. crimes, mostly nonviolent ones such as retail theft or traffic violations.; The Trump administration eliminates a $258 million program that was considered one of the leading efforts in the search for an HIV vaccine.	President Trump participates in a press conference with Elon Musk. President Trump delivers remarks on U.S. steel deal in West Mifflin, Pennsylvania.
Saturday May 31	President Trump announces his intent to withdraw the nomination of Jared Isaacman for administrator of NASA.; Federal agents entered the New York office of Representative Jerry Nadler and handcuffed and briefly detained one of Nadler's aides, during a disagreement recorded on video. "They’re behaving like fascists" Nadler would later comment.; During an Iowa town hall meeting, Senator Joni Ernst responded to constituent's concerns over Trump's proposed cuts to Medicaid saying, "We all are going to die."	

=== June 2025 ===
Date	Events	Photos/videos
Sunday June 1		
Monday June 2	President Trump congratulates Karol Nawrocki in winning the 2025 Polish presidential election, writing on Truth Social: "Congratulations Poland, you picked a WINNER!"; In a phone call with employees, David Richardson, the newly appointed acting head of FEMA said "Yesterday, as everybody knows, [was the] first day of hurricane season. I didn’t realize it was a season." The remarks baffled some FEMA employees who were unclear if he "meant it literally, as a joke, or in some other context."	
Tuesday June 3	Not long after stepping down from his post at DOGE, Elon Musk attacks the Trump administration's signature legislation, the One Big Beautiful Bill Act, writing on X, "I just can't stand it anymore. This massive, outrageous, pork-filled Congressional spending bill is a disgusting abomination."	
Wednesday June 4	Echoing the so-called "Muslim Ban" in his first administration, Trump signs Proclamation 10949, a travel ban fully restricting entry from twelve countries.; President Trump speaks with Russian president Vladimir Putin over the phone.	
Thursday June 5	President Trump makes a telephone call to General Secretary of the Chinese Communist Party Xi Jinping for the first time since taking second presidency.; President Trump and Elon Musk's online feud deteriorates further over social media, with Trump threatening to cut Musk's government subsidies and Musk writing "Time to drop the really big bomb: Donald Trump is in the Epstein files. That is the real reason they have not been made public."	
Friday June 6	Protests against immigration raids begin in the city of Los Angeles, with protesters clashing with local police and federal agents at the Metropolitan Detention Center and multiple federal buildings.; Parts of Trump's press pool ban of the Associated Press are affirmed by a federal appeals court, for the moment, allowing Trump to ban the Associated Press from the Oval Office, Air Force One and the president's home in Mar-A-Lago. The court left intact an order requiring Trump to allow AP to access press events in larger areas such as the East Room.; Kilmar Abrego Garcia is returned to the United States and immediately charged with transporting illegal aliens. Garcia's lawyers say his return and prosecution shows that his deportation without due process was the government "playing games with the court all along."	
Saturday June 7	President Trump and Secretary Rubio attend UFC 316 at the Prudential Center in Newark, along with his children Ivanka Trump and Eric Trump.; As the protests continue into the following day, expanding into Paramount and Compton, President Trump nationalizes the California National Guard and deploys 2,000 members to the protest. California Governor Gavin Newsom criticizes Trump's actions and requests his order to be rescinded.	President Trump with women's bantamweight champion Kayla Harrison
Sunday June 8	President Trump threatens to deploy U.S. Marines into Los Angeles and "have troops everywhere" if the protests do not disperse.	
Monday June 9	Governor Newsom announces his intention to sue the Trump administration for deploying the National Guard without his consent. In response, President Trump agreed with a suggestion that Newsom should be arrested.; President Trump deploys 700 U.S. Marines to Los Angeles from Marine Corps Air Ground Combat Center Twentynine Palms alongside an additional 2,000 National Guard troops.; Directly contradicting a promise he made to Senator Bill Cassidy during his confirmation hearing, Secretary of Health Robert F. Kennedy Jr fires all 17 members of the CDC's Advisory Committee on Immunization Practices.	California National Guard and protesters in Los Angeles
Tuesday June 10	President Trump delivers remarks at Fort Bragg in North Carolina to commemorate the 250th anniversary of the U.S. Army during which he announces the military will restore the names of several military bases formerly named after Confederates. Because of a law forbidding such naming, the names are changed to honor soldiers with similar surnames.; Governor Newsom delivers a televised primetime address to California criticizing President Trump's mobilization of the military in Los Angeles, stating that "democracy is under assault before our eyes."; Mayor Karen Bass declares a local state of emergency and announces a curfew in parts of downtown Los Angeles from 8 p.m. to 6 a.m. PDT.	President Trump delivers remarks at Fort Bragg.
Wednesday June 11	President Trump receives a phone call from Elon Musk expressing regret for recent posts bashing him on Twitter, and later issues a public apology online.; President Trump and First Lady Melania Trump are met with a loud mix of boos and cheers at an opening night showing of Les Misérables at the John F. Kennedy Center for the Performing Arts. They are accompanied by Vice President Vance, Second Lady Usha Vance, Attorney General Pam Bondi, and HHS Secretary Robert F. Kennedy Jr.	President Trump and First Lady Melania Trump at the Kennedy Center
Thursday June 12	President Trump and First Lady Melania Trump host the first Congressional Picnic on the White House South Lawn since his second presidency began.; CA representative Alex Padilla asks a question during a Kristi Noem press conference and is thrown to the floor, handcuffed, and forcibly removed by Secret Service and FBI agents.	President Trump and First Lady Melania Trump at the 2025 Congressional Picnic
Friday June 13		
Saturday June 14	President Trump attends a military parade, held in Washington, D.C., to celebrate the 250th anniversary of the Continental Army. President Trump celebrates his 79th birthday at the same event.; "No Kings" protests were held across the United States in opposition to many of President Trump's policies, as well as an assumed connection between the parade and the president's birthday. Organizers estimate that more than five million people participated in over 2,100 locations.	President Trump at the 250th Anniversary of the U.S. Army Grand Parade and Celebration No Kings rally at the Minnesota State Capitol
Sunday June 15		
Monday June 16	President Trump attends the 51st G7 summit with world leaders of G7 in Kananaskis, Canada. He abruptly leaves the gathering one day early to attend to the escalating conflict between Israel and Iran.; President Trump holds a bilateral meeting with Canadian prime minister Mark Carney and German chancellor Friedrich Merz. In the meeting, Trump tells the two he believes it was a mistake for the group to gather without Vladimir Putin being invited.; President Trump holds a bilateral meeting with British prime minister Keir Starmer, where he signs an executive order to implement the UK–US Trade Deal reducing tariffs between the two countries. In a matter of months, Trump would return to threatening the UK with tariffs, even calling for a "100% tariff on any and all Goods sent to the United States of America."	President Trump and Canadian prime minister Mark Carney G7 leaders at the 51st G7 summit, Trump (not pictured) left the meeting a day early.
Tuesday June 17		
Wednesday June 18	President Trump and Iranian supreme leader Khamenei trade threats on social media, as the President weighs the decision of intervention with his National Security Council.	
Thursday June 19	Through the entirety of Juneteenth, the President makes no mention of the federal holiday commemorating the end of slavery in the United States, except to propose reducing the number of federal holidays, claiming there are too many of them.	
Friday June 20	President Trump announces on Truth Social that he and U.S. Secretary of State Marco Rubio have brokered a peace treaty between the Democratic Republic of the Congo and Rwanda in their war. As of September 2026, fighting continues and the peace process remains unresolved.; White House advisor Kari Lake announces layoffs of 639 employees at the Voice of America.	
Saturday June 21	President Trump orders direct strikes on multiple nuclear sites in Iran. Nuclear experts say the facilities only exist because of Trump's first term rejection of the 2015 Iran nuclear deal and that the President is neutralizing a threat of his own making.; In a short televised address, Trump falsely claims that Iran's nuclear enrichment facilities "have been completely and totally obliterated.” The claim would quickly turn out to be at odds with conflicting intel reports and Trump's justification for the 2026 Iran war eight months later.	President Trump and Vice President Vance in the Situation Room of the White House during the attacks. President Trump addresses the direct strikes against Iran to the nation.
Sunday June 22		
Monday June 23	President Trump announces a ceasefire between Israel and Iran in the Iran–Israel war. The purported ceasefire is broken within hours of the announcement.; A Purple Heart-awarded US Army veteran and legal permanent US resident of 48 years self deports to South Korea after being told by ICE he would be forcibly detained and deported. Sae Joon Park, who was shot in the back during Operation Just Cause, told reporters "I can’t believe this is happening in America."	President Trump's statement on the ceasefire on Truth Social
Tuesday June 24	Trump lashes out at both Iran and Israel for violating the terms of the ceasefire he announced just the night before.; President Trump arrives in the Netherlands for the upcoming NATO summit in The Hague.; President Trump attends a NATO dinner hosted by King Willem-Alexander at Huis ten Bosch.; On invitation by King Willem-Alexander, President Trump stays over at palace Huis ten Bosch, home of the Dutch Royal family.; A whistleblower report is submitted to Congress alleging that senior DOJ official Emil Bove discussed disregarding court orders in order to fulfill Trump's mass deportation goals. DOJ lawyer Erez Reuveni's accusations come one day before Bove's confirmation hearing for a judgeship on the US Court of Appeals.	Group photo of NATO leaders before a dinner at Huis ten Bosch
Wednesday June 25	President Trump has breakfast with the King and Queen of the Netherlands.; President Trump attends the NATO summit where NATO leaders have committed, to Trump's proposal, to invest 5% of GDP annually on defence and security-related spending by 2035.; The White House takes steps to limit the sharing of classified info with Congress after a leak of internal data shows that recent bombings of nuclear facilities in Iran are less successful than Trump had claimed.	President Trump and NATO leaders
Thursday June 26	Commerce Department data shows that US economy shrunk 0.5% in the first quarter of 2025, 0.2% lower than expectations. GDP numbers show the first negative growth rate in three years.	
Friday June 27	President Trump immediately cuts off negotiations on import tariffs with Canada due to disagreements about a Canadian tech tax and announces he will impose punitive tariffs on Canada within a week.; Secretary of Defense Pete Hegseth announces that the naval ship USNS Harvey Milk, named after the Navy submarine officer and gay rights activist, has been renamed the USNS Oscar V. Peterson. An internal memo explains the name change as an attempt to "re-establish the warrior culture" and an unnamed official says the announcement was intentionally timed to occur during Pride month.; The Department of Homeland Security announces it will end Temporary Protected Status protections for 300,000 Haitian immigrants allowed in the US following a devastating earthquake. During the 2024 campaign, Trump attacked the Haitian immigrant community with racist falsehoods.	
Saturday June 28		
Sunday June 29	Private intercepted communications between senior Iranian officials reveal that the US attack on nuclear facilities was attack was less devastating than they had expected.	
Monday June 30	NPR reports that the Trump administration is building a national citizenship database to be used as an national voter list, which is unprecedented in the United States and possibly unlawful.	

== See also ==
- First 100 days of the second Trump presidency – Period from January to April 2025
- List of executive actions by Donald Trump
- Lists of presidential trips made by Donald Trump (international trips)
- Second presidential transition of Donald Trump – Transfer of presidential power from Joe Biden to Donald Trump
- Timeline of the 2024 United States presidential election

U.S. presidential administration timelines
Preceded by Second Trump presidency (2025 Q1)	Second Trump presidency (2025 Q2)	Succeeded by Second Trump presidency (2025 Q3)
