= Executive Order 14333 =

2025 US executive order

- Declaring a Crime Emergency in the District of Columbia
- Front page of Executive Order 14333
- Type: Executive order
- Number: 14333
- President: Donald Trump
- Signed: August 11, 2025

Federal Register details
- Federal Register document number: 2025-15550
- Publication date: August 14, 2025
- Document citation: 90 FR 39301

Executive Order 14333
- Part of the domestic military deployments by the second Trump administration
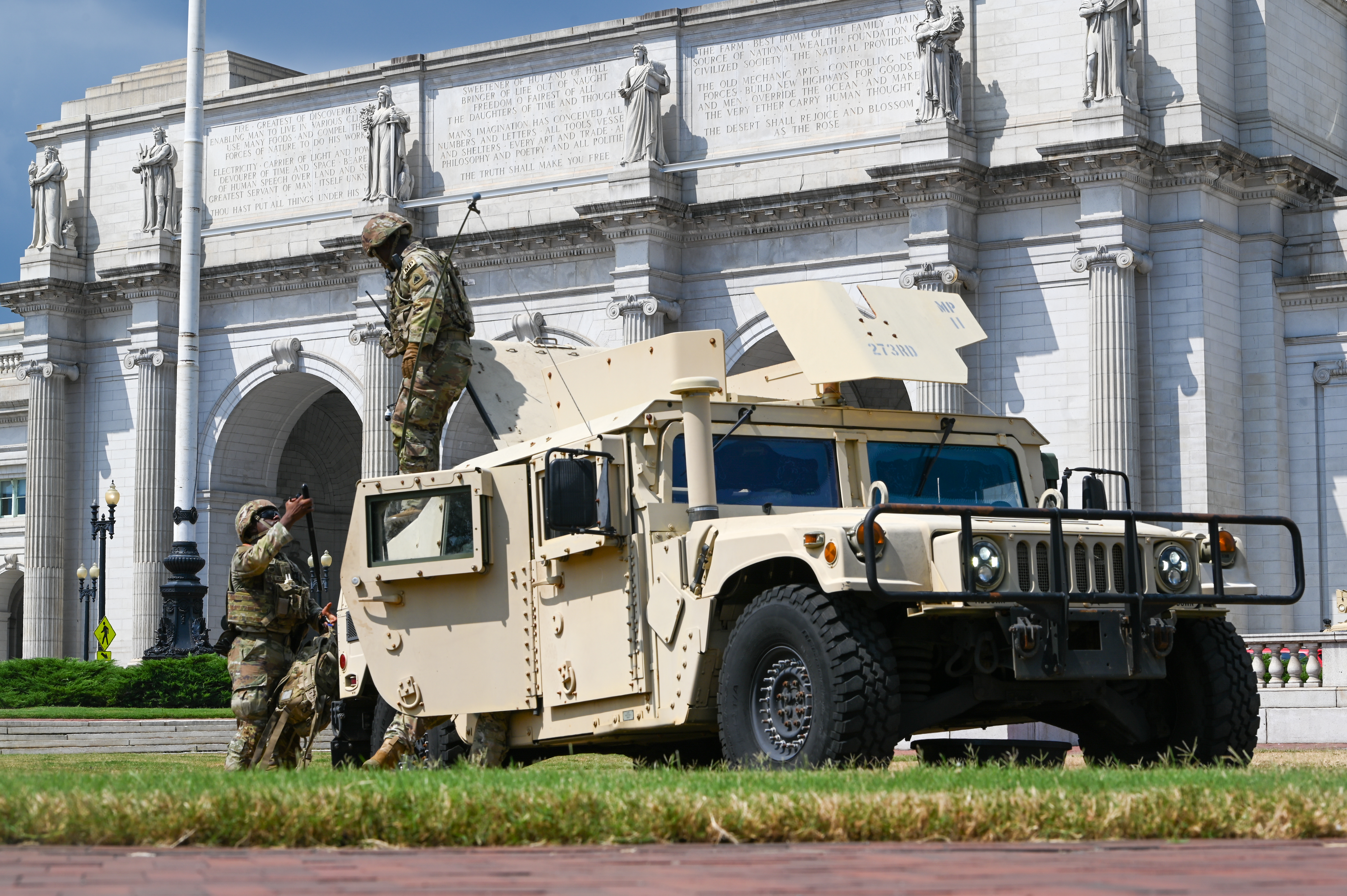
- US Army National Guard soldiers parked outside of Union Station with armored vehicle
- Date: August 11, 2025 – present
- Location: Washington, D.C., United States
- Type: State of emergency
- Cause: High crime (as claimed by the Trump administration)
- Participants: MPD and federal law enforcement
- Arrests: 1,669 (Sep. 5, per White House)

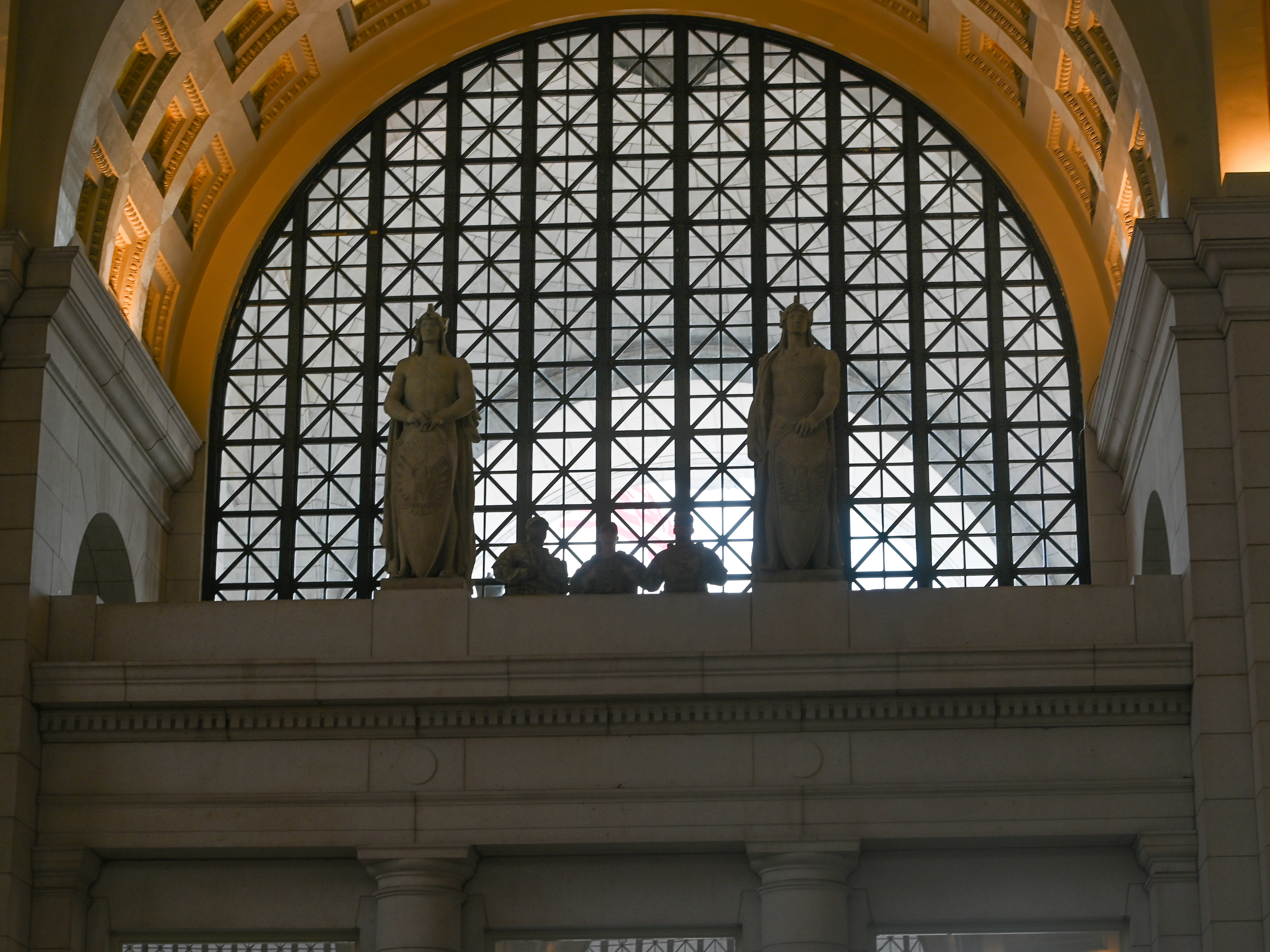
Three National Guard soldiers perched on a top balcony at Union Station

"Declaring a Crime Emergency in the District of Columbia" is an executive order issued by U.S. president Donald Trump in August 2025.

On August 11, 2025, Trump switched control of the Metropolitan Police Department of the District of Columbia (MPDC) from the city government of Washington, D.C., to the federal government, invoking section 740 of the District of Columbia Home Rule Act for the first time in history. Under a separate presidential memorandum and subsequent executive order, Trump also deployed federal law enforcement agencies, the District of Columbia National Guard, and the National Guards of multiple states in response to what he claimed was "rampant crime" in the city, though statistics showed that the city was amidst a 30-year low in crime and that crime was decreasing in 2024–2025. However, a Washington, D.C., police commissioner was placed on leave for allegedly falsifying crime data in mid-May, and the city police union has claimed that underreporting of crime is a systemic problem.

The order federalizing control of the MPDC expired on September 10, but the Secretary of the Army initially extended the National Guard deployment to November 30, and the Secretary of Defense subsequently extended the deployment to February 28, 2026. On September 4, the Attorney General for the District of Columbia filed a lawsuit against the Trump administration to block the National Guard deployment. On November 20, a federal judge ruled that the National Guard deployment was not lawful and issued an order directing the administration to end the deployment but stayed the ruling. After announcing within a day of the ruling that it intended to file an appeal, the Trump administration did so on November 26. On the same day the appeal was filed, two West Virginia National Guard soldiers deployed to the District were shot, and Trump ordered the deployment of 500 additional National Guard troops in response.

In January 2026, the National Guard deployment was extended to the end of the year. The next month, a minority staff report issued by the Senate Homeland Security Committee estimated that the National Guard deployment to the District from August 2025 through the end of February 2026 would cost $332 million (or $602 million on an annualized basis), which compared with a $599 million budget for the MPDC for fiscal year 2026. As noted by the U.S. Justice Department and District Mayor Muriel Bowser, crime statistics from before the National Guard deployment showed falling violent crime and property crime rates in the District.

== Background ==
The Metropolitan Police Department of the District of Columbia (MPD) is normally under control of the city government. Section 1–207.40 of the D.C. Home Rule Act, entitled "Emergency Control of Police" requires the mayor of D.C. to provide to the president "such services of the Metropolitan Police force as the President may deem necessary and appropriate" whenever the president determines that "special conditions of an emergency nature exist which require the use of the Metropolitan Police force for federal purposes". The President is required to notify the leaders of the Committee on the District of Columbia of the Senate and the House of Representatives in writing within 48 hours. The law requires Congress to approve the action within 30 days if it is in session, or after coming into session; otherwise, the services end.

On August 4, 2025, Edward Coristine, a 19-year-old former DOGE employee also known as "Big Balls", was assaulted by two 15-year-old boys, according to MPD, which arrived and apprehended the two suspects. However, city and federal statistics show the number of violent crimes in the District are at their lowest in the last 30 years.

== Timeline ==
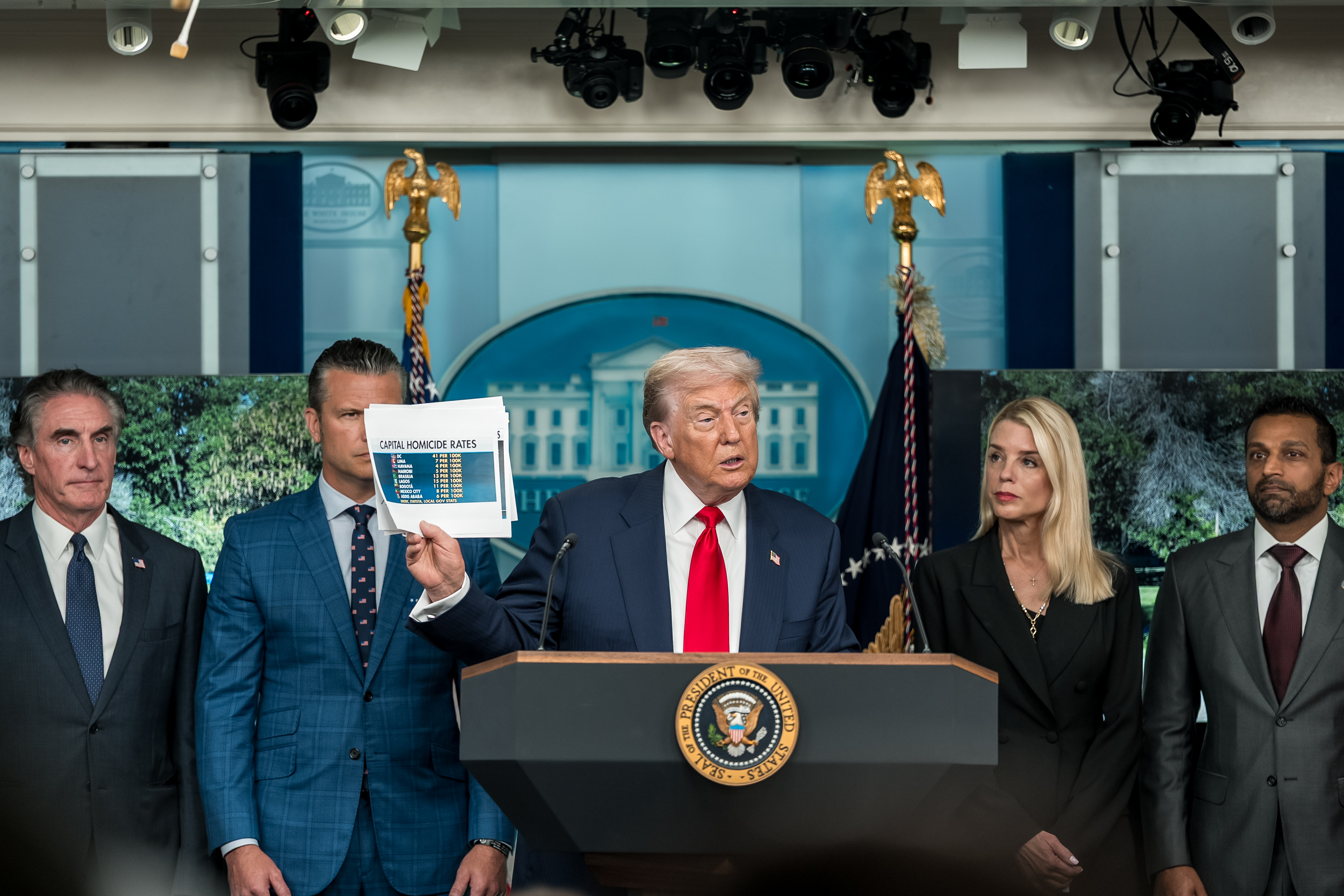
President Donald Trump and FBI Director Kash Patel (far right) in a press conference on crime in Washington, D.C., in August 2025

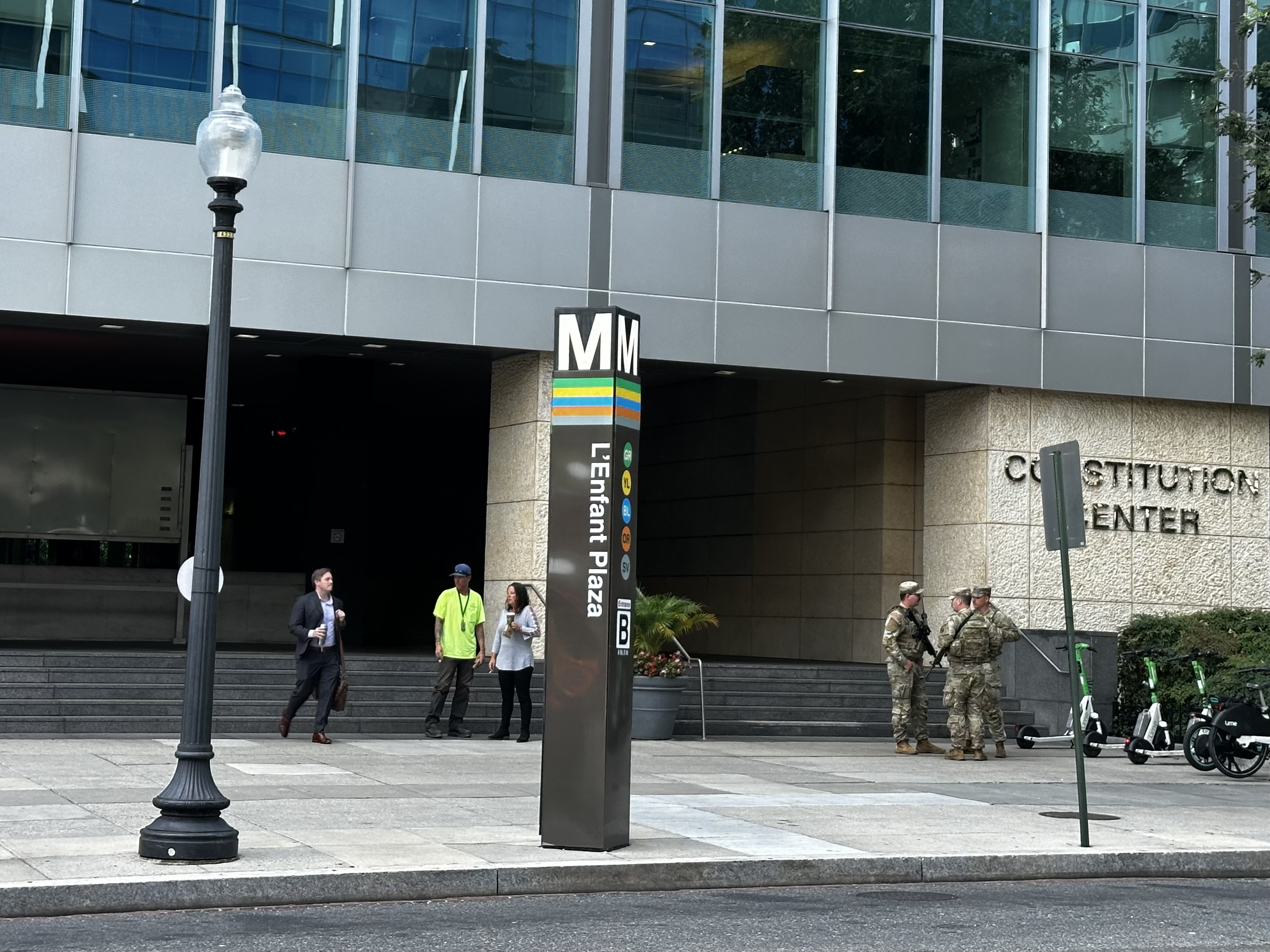
Armed National Guardsmen stand outside L'Enfant Plaza station and Constitution Center

- August 8, 2025: Federal agents from the Federal Bureau of Investigation (FBI), Drug Enforcement Administration, Bureau of Alcohol, Tobacco, Firearms and Explosives, Immigration and Customs Enforcement, and other agencies began patrolling the streets of Washington, D.C. President Trump administratively reassigned them to work under the direction of the United States Park Police.
- August 11: Trump invoked Section 740, declaring a public safety emergency of rampant crime in the city. Trump at the same time announced the deployment of 800 troops from the District of Columbia National Guard, with 100-200 expected to be on duty at any given time. Both would be commanded by the head of the U.S. Marshals Service under the United States Attorney General, Pam Bondi. Federal officials do not have the authority to arrest people for minor crimes, even in the federal district, and so would need to detain any suspected criminals and wait for the D.C. Metropolitan Police to arrive and perform the arrest. In an attempt to support his claims, Trump cited a chart from social media containing several errors and out-of-date statistics. He also falsely claimed that "murders in 2023 reached the highest rate probably ever". In 2023, D.C. had a homicide rate of 39.4 per 100,000, about seven times the national homicide rate of 5.6. However, D.C. recorded higher homicide rates in the 1990s. Furthermore, in 2024, city and federal crime statistics showed violent crime in the district at a 30-year low after reaching a 20-year high the year before, with the homicide rate dropping by 30% to 27.4 per 100,000.
- August 15: United States Attorney General Pam Bondi appointed acting DEA administrator Terry Cole as "emergency police commissioner". Mayor Muriel Bowser and D.C. Attorney General Brian Schwalb criticized the move as unlawful, stating that the federalization of police did not authorize the administration to change the MPD chain of command, with Schwalb filing a lawsuit against the appointment in federal court. The Trump administration then negotiated with the Bowser administration, allowing Pamela Smith, the D.C. police chief, to remain in charge.

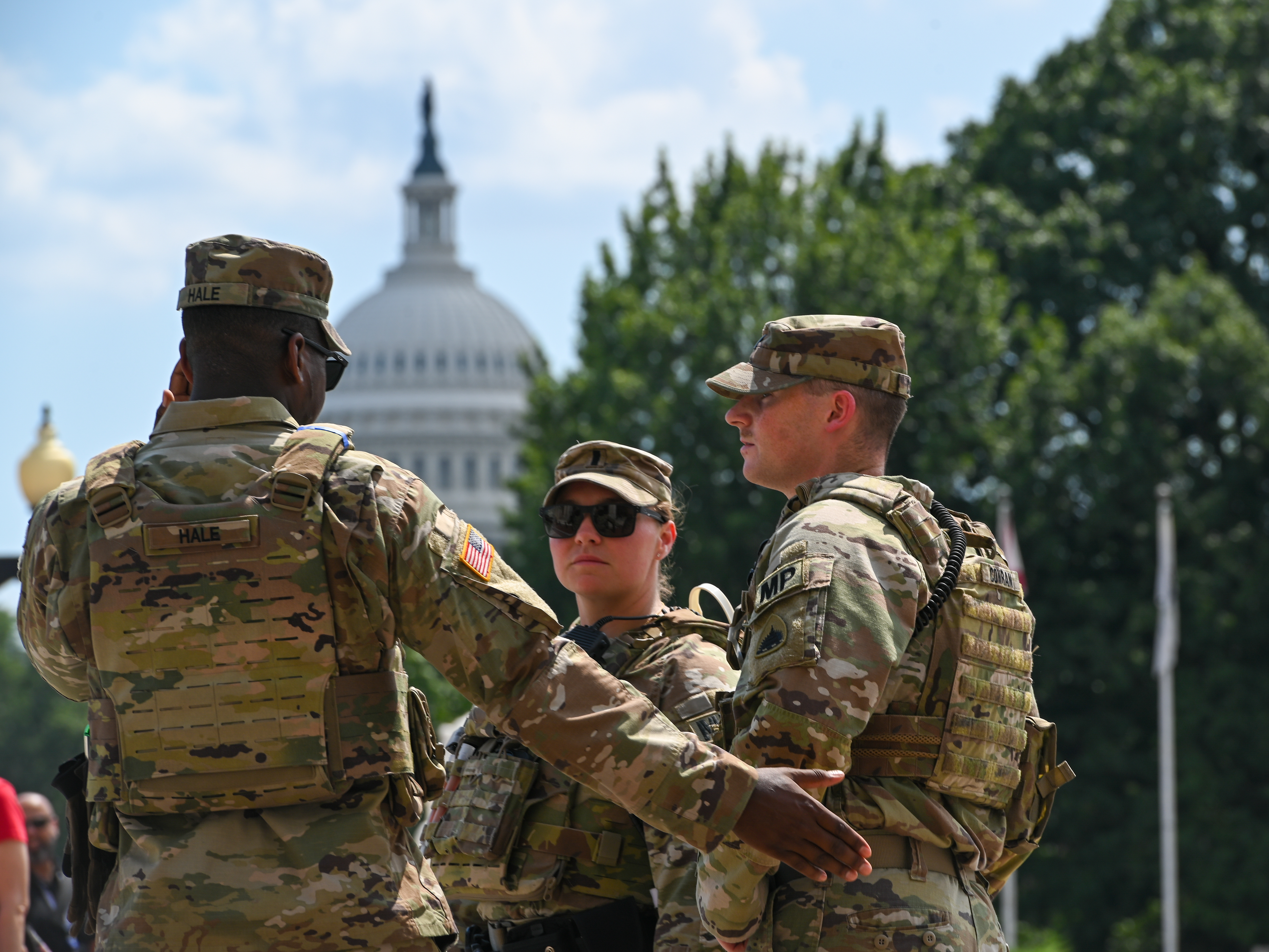
National Guard soldiers in front of the United States Capitol

- August 16: The Republican governors of Ohio, South Carolina, and West Virginia announced that they would be sending hundreds of National Guard or military police from their states.
- August 18: The Republican governor of Mississippi announced that he would send the National Guard from his state.
- August 19: The Republican governors of Louisiana and Tennessee announced that they would also send hundreds of National Guard personnel from their states to D.C.
- August 25: Trump signed Executive Order 14339, "Additional Measures To Address the Crime Emergency in the District of Columbia", and Executive Order 14340, "Measures To End Cashless Bail and Enforce the Law in the District of Columbia".
- August 26: National Guard members were assigned to over 40 "beautification projects" in D.C., including picking up trash and spreading mulch on the grounds of the National Mall and other federal property.
- August 27: The Trump administration took control of Union Station, which had been managed by Amtrak.
- November 10: A West Virginia Circuit Court Judge in Kanawha County ruled that the deployment of the West Virginia National Guard did not violate state law.
- November 26: Two West Virginia National Guardsmen were shot outside Farragut West station. One of the soldiers died of her injuries.
- July 2026: The pentagon confirms the deployment will continue until Inauguration Day 2029.
- July 2026: The administration announced a US$292 million housing contract for up to 2,000 people in the National Guard.

== Protests ==
Some local residents protested the increased presence of federal law enforcement and the National Guard. A checkpoint on 14th St, a popular nightlife area, was met with a crowd of about 100 protestors, some who jeered at the officers and others who warned approaching drivers about the checkpoint, which eventually was disbanded later that night.

On August 16, hundreds of protesters rallied at Dupont Circle and then marched to the White House.

D.C.'s grand jury declined to indict at least four people who were arrested. Brendan Ballou, a former prosecutor with the U.S. Attorney's Office in the District said "Not only have I never heard of this happening, I've never heard of a prosecutor who's heard of this happening."

Among those who were charged was Sean Dunn. Dunn was charged with felony assault after allegedly throwing a submarine sandwich at a Customs and Border Patrol agent. He had worked as a paralegal for the Department of Justice and was fired after his arrest. He became known as "sandwich guy", and some protesters lauded him in their signs, such as one that said "One Small Sub for Man… One Giant Gesture for Democracy". Banksy-style posters were also put up around D.C. with a man wielding a hoagie. Other images showed Jeanine Pirro, the U.S. Attorney for D.C., Stephen Miller, a Trump advisor, and Secretary of Defense Pete Hegseth being hit in the head with hoagies. The White House had drawn attention to Dunn's actions and arrest with what The Daily Beast described as "an over-the-top video showing heavily armed agents carrying out his arrest, despite his attorney saying he had previously offered to surrender willingly". A grand jury refused to indict him of the felony charge the government brought against Dunn. After that legal failure, a misdemeanor charge was brought against Dunn for the same actions. The jury hearing the subsequent trial declared Dunn not guilty of assault.

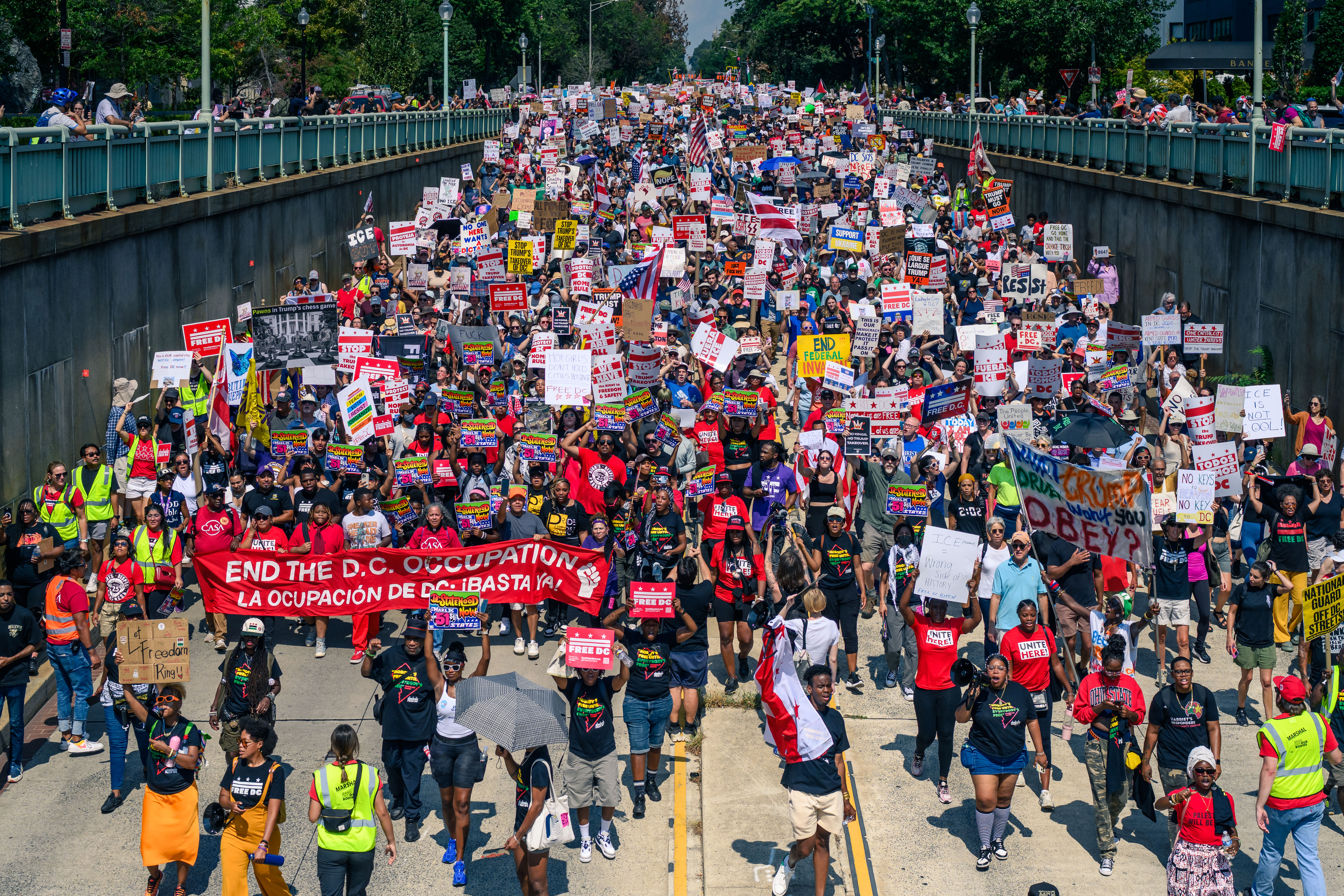
Thousands of people protest in D.C. on September 6

On September 6, thousands of people joined the "We Are All D.C." march, protesting the National Guard presence and carrying signs such as "Trump must go now", "Free DC", and "Resist Tyranny". One of the protesters interviewed by Reuters said "I'm here to protest the occupation of D.C. We're opposing the authoritarian regime, and we need to get the federal police and the National Guard off our streets", and another said "What they're trying to do in D.C. is what they're trying to do with other dictatorships. They're testing D.C., and if people tolerate it enough, they're gonna do it to more and more areas. So we have to stop it while we still can."

Students at Georgetown, Howard, George Washington, and American universities held a walkout and protest on September 10.

== Analysis ==
Troops were mobilized from Republican-led states which had 10 cities with higher crime rates than D.C. Trump said the deployment brought "total safety" and a "miracle" reduction in crime, citing a week without murders, though data at the time showed violent crime was already declining in 2024–2025. Before the military intervention, crime statistics showed D.C. being in a record 30-year low in crime, although there was a small spike in lethality in 2023 that since came down.

According to preliminary MPD data, there was a moderate decrease in reported crime in the first week of the policy compared to the week before, but the decrease was spread unevenly across different types, with robberies and automobile break-ins down 40% but burglary and assault with a dangerous weapon up 6% and 14% respectively. The administration stated that 300 people lacking legal immigration status had been arrested by federal officials in the district that week—ten times higher than usual weekly averages. According to CBS News on 3 October 2025, "internal government data (...) shows nearly 40% of over 3,500 arrests made since the operation began in early August were immigration-related".

NPR looked at D.C. Superior Court data over the first two weeks of the takeover, finding that about 20% of the 1,050 cases looked at were felonies, while the remainder were misdemeanors, traffic offenses, or "no papered" (dropped over concerns about weak evidence, questionable searches or relative insignificance of the crime compared to the resources needed to pursue it). Notably, in the second week cases the proportion of cases "no-papered" decreased from 17% to 1%, and the workload of the court increased to "unheard of" levels, having to stay open and arraign defendants past 1 am on certain days.

Federal judge Zia Faruqui criticized the actions of federal law enforcement in D.C., dismissing weapons possession charges against a man who was stopped by a combined force of MPD and federal agents outside Trader Joe's as he "appeared to have been singled out because he is a Black man who carried a backpack that looked heavy". Faruqui called the officers' apprehension of the man "without a doubt the most illegal search I've ever seen in my life" and said that "A high school student would know this was an illegal search."

On September 6, The New York Times reported that grand juries in D.C. had repeatedly rejected prosecutors' charges, which it said suggested "what could be read as a citizens' revolt" and that they "may have had enough of prosecutors seeking harsh charges in a highly politicized environment".

One estimate found "the daily expense of deploying troops to D.C. is 4.3 times greater than the daily cost of operating public housing for D.C.'s entire unhoused population."

== Other proposed deployments ==
Trump has proposed similar deployments of the National Guard to other cities, first naming Chicago and later Baltimore, New York City, Portland, Seattle, and San Francisco to combat "runaway crime", despite broadly lower rates of crime recorded in 2025 compared to 2020 and 2024 for those cities. Governors and mayors of those cities and the states they are in have reacted negatively to the proposals, criticizing them as an abuse of power and political retaliation against Democratic local governments, particularly in majority-minority and sanctuary cities. Although Trump, as president, has direct control over the D.C. National Guard and can federalize state National Guard forces through the Insurrection Act of 1807, his ability to deploy federal law enforcement and troops is more limited outside of D.C. On September 6, Trump sent a tweet with a parody of the war film Apocalypse Now, that said in part "Chicago about to find out why it's called the Department of WAR", referring to his desired renaming of the Department of Defense. Reuters described the text as "accompanied by a seemingly artificial intelligence-generated picture of Trump dressed as a military officer character in the film with helicopter gunships and explosions in the background".

== Response ==
District of Columbia v. Trump
- Court: United States District Court for the District of Columbia
- Started: September 4, 2025
- Docket nos.: 1:25-cv-03005 25-5418

Court membership
- Judge sitting: Jia Cobb

The moves received both protest and praise. Street protests and complaints from the D.C. government about lack of effective prosecutions due to vacancies in the federal United States Attorney for the District of Columbia (which prosecutes all adult crimes) and the two vacancies on the District of Columbia Court of Appeals (which must be nominated by the U.S. President and confirmed by the U.S. Senate) occurred on the day of Trump's announcement. The head of the D.C. Police Union praised President Trump's temporary takeover of the Metropolitan Police and deployment of National Guard troops as a "critical stopgap" amid "out of control" crime, although they want the action to be only temporary.

In response to the announcements from the governors of Ohio, South Carolina, West Virginia, Mississippi and Louisiana that they would be sending hundreds of National Guard to D.C. from their states to support Trump's effort, journalist Philip Bump analyzed FBI crime data and determined that 64 cities in those five states had higher violent crime rates than D.C. Bump commented "Those governors are more worried about the 700,000 residents of D.C., theoretically, than the 1.7 million people in those 64 cities they actually represent."

=== Legal challenges ===
Brian Schwalb, Attorney General for the District of Columbia interprets Section 740 to mean the mayor and police chief remain in the chain of command, and disputes that this allows a federal takeover. Schwalb stated that contrary to Trump's assertion that D.C. police can now do "whatever the hell they want", the US Constitution and District law still apply to police conduct. On August 15, 2025, Schwalb sued President Trump, contending that his administration's executive actions asserting control over the D.C. police department and attempting to install an emergency police commissioner were unconstitutional and violate the Home Rule Act; the lawsuit was later settled after the administrations backed down.

On September 4, Schwalb launched another lawsuit to end the National Guard deployment, after a federal judge ruled that the earlier deployment of the National Guard in Los Angeles was illegal, on the basis that federal law generally prohibits the military from performing local policing. On November 20, District of Columbia U.S. District Court Judge Jia Cobb ordered the administration to end the National Guard deployment, but stayed the decision for 21 days to allow for an appeal. On November 26, the Trump administration filed an emergency appeal with the United States Court of Appeals for the District of Columbia Circuit. On December 4, the D.C. Circuit issued an administrative stay of the D.C. District Court ruling. On December 17, a panel of D.C. Circuit judges issued a further stay of the lower court ruling.

=== Public opinion ===
A poll of D.C. residents between August 14–17 conducted by The Washington Post and the Schar School found that 80% of respondents opposed Trump's federalization, concerns about crime and safety had decreased compared to previous years, and most respondents opposed the forced shutdown of homeless encampments as well as MPD assistance to federal agencies deporting undocumented immigrants. Additionally, 72% of those surveyed supported D.C. statehood, the highest figure in a Post poll about the issue. Despite this, some officials in the Trump administration, such as Vice President JD Vance, have claimed that the takeover is popular with residents without any proof. In a national poll conducted on August 22–24 by Reuters and Ipsos, 46% of respondents opposed the deployment of the National Guard to D.C., 38% approved, and 16% were uncertain. There was a significant partisan split in responses, with 80% of Democrats, 52% of Independents, and 12% of Republicans opposing the deployment, and 76% of Republicans, 28% of Independents, and 8% of Democrats approving. When asked about the takeover of the MPD, people responded similarly.

== In popular culture ==
The animated television series South Park parodied Trump's D.C. military intervention in "Sickofancy", the third episode of its 27th season.
