= Zero Units =

CIA-backed Afghan paramilitaries

Zero Units were intelligence units and a paramilitary force in the Islamic Republic of Afghanistan. They operated under the National Directorate of Security (NDS), the country's intelligence and security service, and worked in coordination with the United States' Central Intelligence Agency (CIA). The units were called "death squads" by some human rights groups, and were linked to a number of extrajudicial killings. The units were notorious for conducting quick, brutal night raids aimed against insurgents and high value members of the Taliban and ISIS. One estimate suggested one of the four Zero Units, 02, was responsible for at least 457 deaths in over 107 raids.

Zero Units have drawn comparisons to South Vietnam's counter-insurgent Phoenix Program.

== History ==
The Zero Units were officially formed in approximately 2008.

Following the collapse and the takeover of the country by the Taliban, approximately 10,000 Zero Unit members and their family members were given asylum in the United States for fear of Taliban retaliation.

In 2025, Zero Units gained some attention in the US after Rahmanullah Lakanwal, a former member of Unit 03 from Kandahar, was involved in the shooting of two National Guard troops in Washington, DC.

== Tactics and structure ==
There were four Zero Unit squads. Groups sometimes descended from helicopters.

=== Night raids ===
ProPublica described the night raids as "quick, brutal operations designed to have resounding psychological impacts while ostensibly removing high-priority enemy targets." They may have been based on the Phoenix Program, and are part of the "kill-capture program".

One U.S. Army Ranger said "You go on night raids, make more enemies, then you gotta go on more night raids for the more enemies you now have to kill."

== Civilian casualties ==
The 02 unit killed at least 452 civilians over four years.

Attacks on civilians were often done as a result of flawed intelligence. Even raids that did capture or kill militants often killed civilians. Children as young as two were killed. Survivors witnessing night raids were often left traumatized.

A CIA spokesperson said "As a rule, the U.S. takes extraordinary measures — beyond those mandated by law — to reduce civilian casualties in armed conflict, and treats any claim of human rights abuses with the utmost seriousness," and suggested a systemic propaganda campaign because "of the threat they posed to Taliban rule."

High civilian death tolls have "time and again, turned people against the United States and the local government it supported."

Batour believes the Zero Unit strategy had actually made enemies of families like his. He said his brothers had both supported the government and he did, too, vowing never to join the Taliban. Now, he said, he’s not so sure.

== See also ==
- CIA activities in Afghanistan
