= 2025 Washington, D.C., National Guard shooting =

Attack in the United States

- Part of the domestic military deployments by the second Trump administration
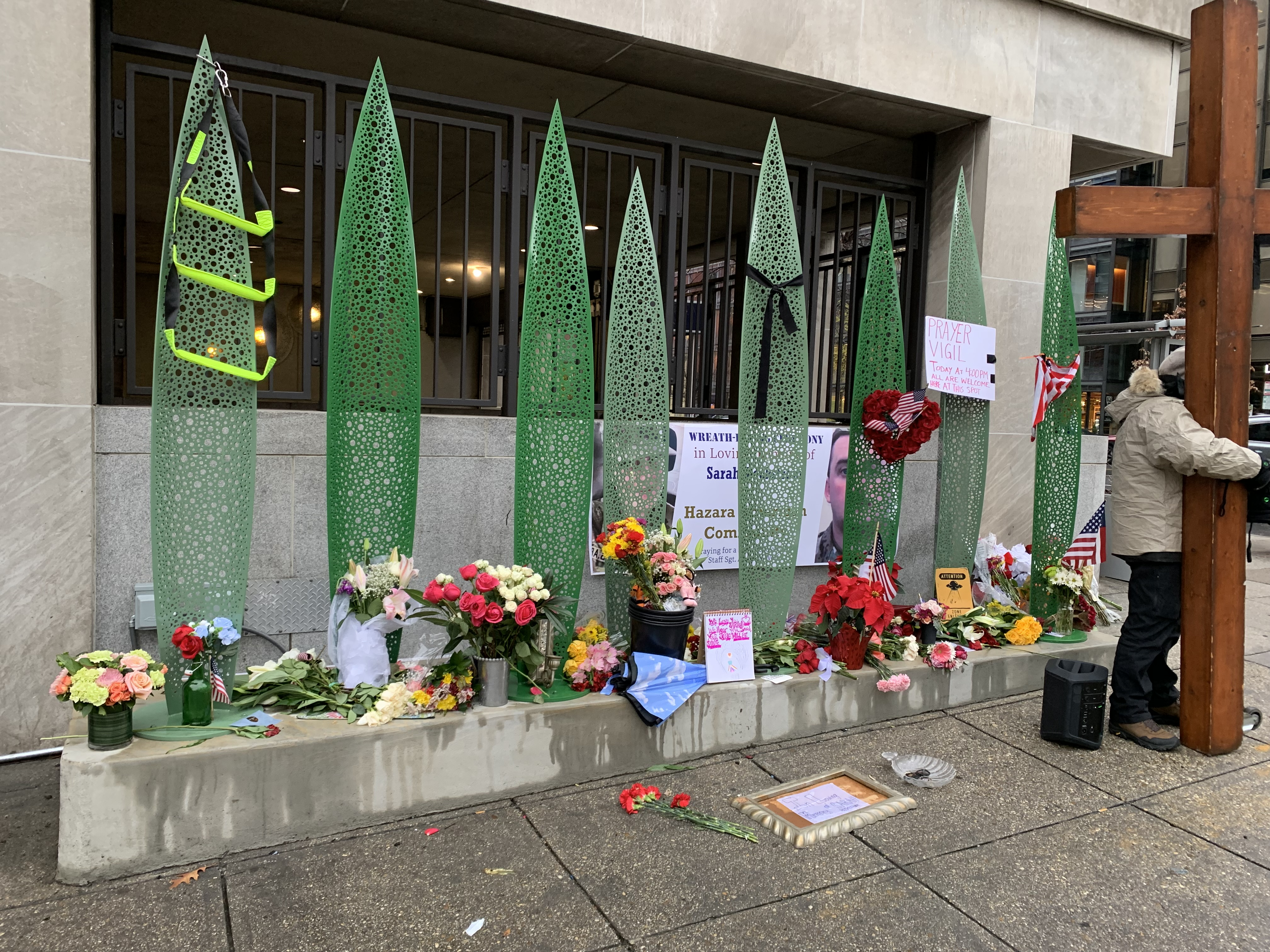
- Memorial at the location of the shooting
- Location: 38.9012°N 77.0393°W; Near Farragut West station 17th and I Streets; Washington, D.C., US
- Date: November 26, 2025 c. 2:15 p.m. (EST)
- Attack type: Shooting
- Weapons: .357 Magnum Smith & Wesson Model 340PD revolver; Stolen service rifle
- Deaths: 1
- Injuries: 2 (including the accused)
- Motive: Under investigation
- Accused: Rahmanullah Lakanwal

On November 26, 2025, two members of the West Virginia National Guard who were participating in the deployment of federal law enforcement and National Guard forces were shot near the Farragut West metro station in Washington, D.C., United States, two blocks away from the White House. One of the service members died later from her injuries, and the male suspect was critically wounded.

The suspect was later identified as Rahmanullah Lakanwal, an Afghan national who had previously received paramilitary instruction under contract with the Central Intelligence Agency (CIA) in Afghanistan. Following the attack, President Donald Trump announced his request for the deployment of an additional 500 National Guard troops and promised a further crackdown on immigration. The Trump administration blamed the attack on Biden-era policies, and some Republican politicians called to deport all Islamists.

== Background ==
Before the shooting, the deployment of National Guard troops, including the contingent from the West Virginia National Guard, to Washington, D.C., was part of a broader domestic-military mobilization ordered in August 2025 by President Donald Trump. The troops were stationed near Farragut Square, approximately two blocks northwest of the White House, as part of patrols in downtown Washington. The deployment had been controversial, and a federal judge had ruled a week prior that such a deployment was unlawful. The ruling was stayed until December 11 pending an appeal by the Trump administration.

== Shooting ==
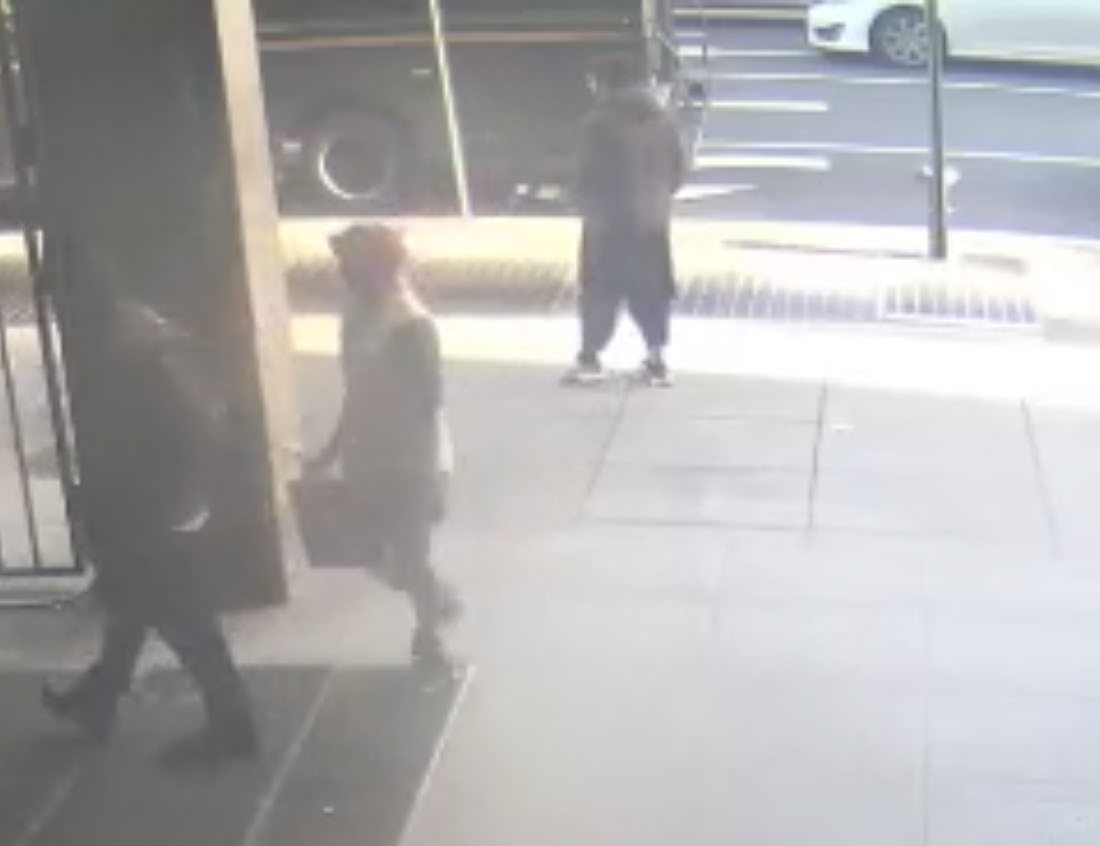
Alleged gunman (background) is seen standing on sidewalk of I Street outside of Farragut West station before the shooting.

The shooting occurred on November 26, 2025, outside the 17th street exit to the Farragut West metro station in Washington, D.C., two blocks northwest of the White House. The suspect leaned around the corner of the metro entrance and engaged 4 guardsmen with a .357 Magnum Smith & Wesson revolver, immediately inflicting head injuries on U.S. Army Spc. Sarah Beckstrom and U.S. Air Force Staff Sgt. Andrew Wolfe. In the minutes that followed Air Force Maj Edwin Stanfield and Army MAJ. Ryan S. Reynolds were able to disarm and subdue the assailant. Reynolds inflicted at least one gunshot wound to the assailant while Stanfield was able to disarm and stab him multiple times. One of the soldiers allegedly heard the shooter yell "Allahu Akbar".

Gunman (black) shooting the victims outside Farragut West station.

Law enforcement officials described it as an ambush-style attack and said 10 to 15 shots were fired. West Virginia governor Patrick Morrisey initially announced that two National Guard members had been killed in a shooting near the White House. Soon afterward, he backtracked, saying reports about their condition were conflicting.

A male suspect was taken into custody and was reported to be seriously injured, though not life-threatening, after being stabbed with a pocket knife by a guardsman, and also shot four times.

== Victims ==
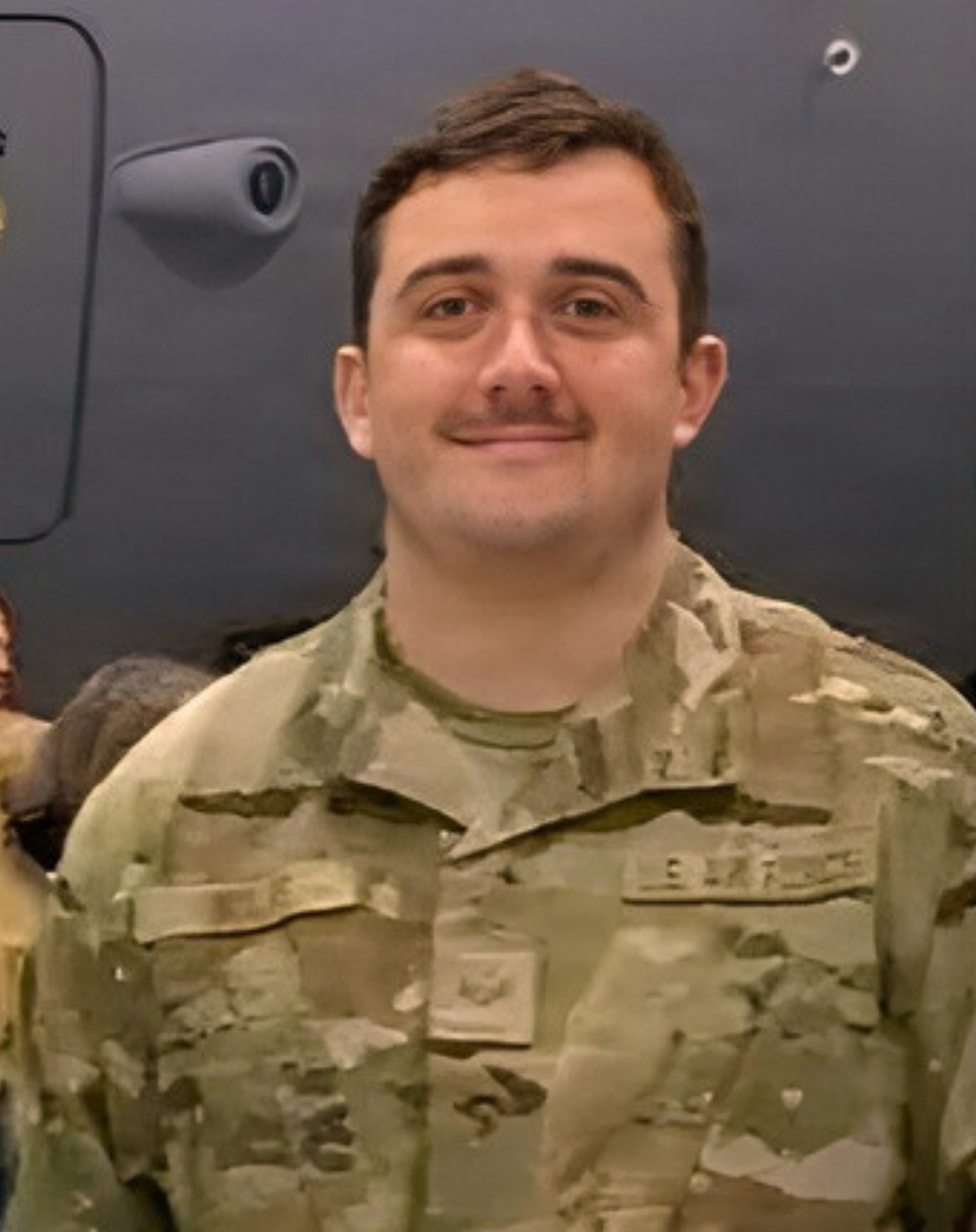
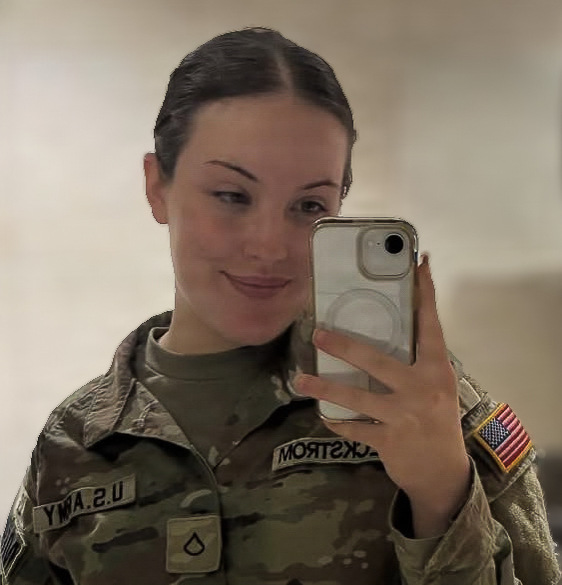
Andrew Wolfe (left) and Sarah Beckstrom (right). Wolfe was left in critical condition while Beckstrom died from her injuries.

The two West Virginia National Guard members were identified as 24-year-old Staff Sergeant Andrew Wolfe of Martinsburg, West Virginia, and 20-year-old Specialist Sarah Beckstrom of Summersville, West Virginia. Both were initially transported by air medical services to MedStar Washington Hospital Center.

Beckstrom had enlisted with the National Guard in June 2023 and had been deployed to D.C. in August 2025. She died from her injuries on November 27, one day after the shooting. After Beckstrom's death, her body was escorted by motorcade from the MedStar Washington Hospital Center. National Guard and members of local law enforcement flanked the streets of the procession. She was buried in a private funeral at the West Virginia National Cemetery in Grafton, West Virginia, on December 10.

Wolfe had enlisted in February 2019, before he graduated from Musselman High School. He was listed in serious condition on December 1, but family members stated he was improving and responding to some commands by medical officials. By December 13, Wolfe was able to breathe on his own and stand without assistance and had been moved to physical rehabilitation at MedStar Washington Hospital Center.

On February 24, 2026, President Donald Trump honored Wolfe and Beckstrom during the 2026 State of the Union Address, awarding Wolfe the Purple Heart and posthumously awarding Beckstrom the same medal.

== Accused ==
The suspect was identified as Rahmanullah Lakanwal (born February 9, 1996), a 29-year-old Afghan national of Pashtun background from Khost Province. Lakanwal did not cooperate with investigators. He entered the United States on September 8, 2021, under Operation Allies Welcome, a humanitarian parole program allowing vulnerable Afghans to enter and stay for two years without permanent immigration status. Lakanwal was last reported living in Bellingham, Washington, with his wife and five children, where he has lived since his departure from Afghanistan. He applied for asylum in 2024, which was granted in April 2025.

In Afghanistan, Lakanwal worked for Unit 03—also known as the Kandahar Strike Force—an elite CIA-backed counterterrorism "Zero Unit" team, part of the Afghan National Directorate of Security in Kandahar Province. "Zero Units" were paramilitary groups "known for their brutality and labeled death squads", trained for nighttime raids on suspected Taliban members. A friend of Lakanwal said he "suffered from mental health issues and was disturbed by the casualties his unit had caused". Lakanwal first worked with the CIA in 2011.

Lakanwal began refusing to eat food and sometimes to even drink, and was hospitalized as a result in July 2026 due to his deteriorating condition. A protective order which prevented the government from accessing Lakanwal's medical records was lifted after an emergency hearing after it was concluded that prosecutors should have access to Lakanwal's recent medical records.

== Investigation ==
The Federal Bureau of Investigation (FBI) will investigate the shooting as an act of possible terrorism.

Following the shooting, federal agents, along with the FBI, the Whatcom County Sheriff's Office and the Bellingham Police Department executed search warrants at the Walton Place apartments in Bellingham, and seized several electronic devices including cell phones, laptops, and iPads. Subsequent search warrants were also executed at another residence in San Diego, California, where Lakanwal also had ties to the city itself.

== Legal proceedings ==
On December 2, 2025, Lakanwal appeared before D.C. Superior Court Judge Renee Raymond and pled not guilty to the charges of first-degree murder, assault with intent to kill, and illegal possession of a firearm. He remotely connected from a hospital bed with an interpreter. Lakanwal stated he was in pain and could not open his eyes.

Lakanwal was initially charged in the United States District Court for the District of Columbia on federal charges of transporting a firearm in interstate commerce with the intent to commit an offense punishable by imprisonment for more than one year, and transporting a stolen firearm in interstate commerce. Additionally, Lakanwal was charged with first-degree murder while armed, assault with intent to kill while armed, and two counts of possession of a firearm during a crime of violence in violation of the Code of the District of Columbia. Lakanwal was arraigned on February 4, 2026, and pleaded not guilty to all charges. On June 16, 2026, Lakanwal was arraigned on a superseding indictment charging him with additional federal offenses including murder of person assisting a federal officer, three counts of attempted murder of person assisting a federal officer, discharge of a firearm causing death and three counts of discharge of a firearm during a crime of violence. Because some of these offenses are punishable by death, the Department of Justice is currently conducting administrative review to determine whether it will seek the death penalty against Lakanwal.

After Lakanwal was hospitalized during a hunger strike, United States District Judge Amit Mehta issued a court order allowing Lakanwal to be force fed and receive nonconsensual medical treatment until Lakanwal was no longer at risk of death.

== Aftermath ==
Hours after the shooting, Trump requested 500 additional National Guard troops to be deployed to Washington, D.C. Trump invited the family of Sarah Beckstrom to the White House after speaking with them and announced he had extended the same offer to the family of Andrew Wolfe.

West Virginia Governor Patrick Morrisey issued a proclamation for all West Virginians to observe a statewide moment of silence or prayer the afternoon of November 28 and for all flags to be flown at half-staff in honor of both service members and Beckstrom's death. The town of Summersville, where Beckstrom lived after high school, held a candlelight vigil for her on November 29.

=== Immigration ===
Reuters described Republican politicians as blaming the Biden administration for poor vetting even though the suspect was granted asylum under the Trump administration. A number of Republican legislators also received criticism for their previous stance on immigration from Afghanistan, including Kentucky Representative Andy Barr. Axios described Republicans as increasing anti-immigration rhetoric following the shooting with calls to "deport them all," with Republican Senator Tommy Tuberville calling on banning all Islamic immigrants and to deport "every single Islamist who is living among us just waiting to attack". The New York Times described Trump as using the shooting to cast suspicion on all refugees without evidence. On November 27, when asked if he was considering deporting all Afghans based on the crime of one man, Trump said, "No, but there's a lot of problems with Afghans," repeated claims of crime by immigrants, and said he was "looking at" deporting the wife and children of the suspect. Trump then pivoted to discussing Somali refugees in Minnesota, saying they were "taking over" the state. When asked what Somali refugees had to do with the Afghan suspect, Trump responded, "Ah, nothing, but Somalians have caused a lot of trouble; they're ripping us off a lot of money," following which he proceeded to criticize Minnesota Democratic Representative Ilhan Omar, who was born in Somalia. The Associated Press reported that Afghan immigrants were afraid to leave their houses for fear of being deported or attacked with hate speech following the shooting, and refugee groups worried about Afghans being considered guilty by association.

On November 27, the United States Citizenship and Immigration Services (USCIS) announced that all immigration applications for Afghan nationals were halted indefinitely, pending a review of security and vetting procedures. Also, under President Trump's direction, USCIS announced that it will re-examine all green cards issued to individuals from the 19 "countries of concern" listed in Proclamation 10949. USCIS said in a statement that when reviewing immigrants from those countries, the agency will now consider "negative, country-specific factors," including whether the country is able to issue "secure identity documents." That evening, Trump announced on social media he would "permanently pause migration from all Third World Countries" and denaturalize migrants "who undermine domestic tranquillity," following which he proceeded to mock Minnesota Governor Tim Walz's intelligence regarding Somali immigrants and Ilhan Omar's hijab.

USCIS Director Joseph Edlow tweeted that "USCIS has halted all asylum decisions".

Some refugee-advocacy organizations, such as IRAP, have criticized the administration's decision to suspend all asylum decisions after the shooting, calling it an unusually broad measure with serious consequences for those seeking protection. These organizations asserted that the government had not presented evidence linking asylum seekers as a group to the attack. They warned that the suspension could put vulnerable applicants at greater risk.

== Reactions and analysis ==
President Donald Trump addresses the shooting

Avatar of Homeland Security

Homeland Security
(@DHSgov)
tweeted:

The stakes have never been higher, and the goal has never been more clear:

Remigration now.

November 28, 2025

Avatar of Secretary Kristi Noem

Secretary Kristi Noem
(@Sec_Noem)
tweeted:

English:

I just met with the President.

I am recommending a full travel ban on every damn country that's been flooding our nation with killers, leeches, and entitlement junkies.

Our forefathers built this nation on blood, sweat, and the unyielding love of freedom—not for foreign invaders to slaughter our heroes, suck dry our hard-earned tax dollars, or snatch the benefits owed to AMERICANS.

WE DON'T WANT THEM. NOT ONE.

Dec 1, 2025

President Donald Trump, who was at his Mar-a-Lago resort in Palm Beach County, Florida, at the time of the shooting, initially posted on Truth Social: "The animal that shot the two National Guardsmen, with both being critically wounded and now in two separate hospitals, is also severely wounded, but regardless, will pay a very steep price. God bless our Great National Guard and all of our Military and Law Enforcement. These are truly Great People. I, as President of the United States, and everyone associated with the Office of the Presidency, am with you!" Vice President JD Vance, who was at Fort Campbell in Hopkinsville, Kentucky, asked for prayers for the national guardsmen who were shot.

Attorney General Pam Bondi and Kash Patel, the director of the Federal Bureau of Investigation, called for prayers after the shooting. Senate Minority leader Chuck Schumer, House Minority leader Hakeem Jeffries, and Senate Majority leader John Thune expressed their sympathies to the West Virginia National Guardsmen. West Virginia governor Patrick Morrisey honored the National Guardsmen on social media. Bellingham's mayor Kim Lund condemned the attack.

The shooting intensified debate over the necessity of a military deployment to the district. In the analysis of Juliette Kayyem, formerly a high-ranking operative within the US homeland security apparatus,

The president, as we all know, wanted the National Guard in DC, despite decreasing crime rates there, because he viewed it as a war zone or too much crime there. We now know, over the last couple months, these National Guard units have been really been used for roaming patrols, visibility patrols, or, in many instances, sort of landscaping, picking up trash. None of that's bad, per se, but none of that is unique to the National Guard, nor is it what they're trained to do. [...] The National Guard supports civilian efforts in a disaster or in a homeland or is deployed abroad. This, as we all know, is a unique, and some say illegal use by the president of the National Guard in DC.

Trump went on to call for large changes to US immigration policy as a response to the shooting, posting on Truth Social:

…Even as we have progressed technologically, Immigration Policy has eroded those gains and living conditions for many. I will permanently pause migration from all Third World Countries to allow the U.S. system to fully recover, terminate all of the millions of Biden illegal admissions, including those signed by Sleepy Joe Biden’s Autopen, and remove anyone who is not a net asset to the United States, or is incapable of loving our Country, end all Federal benefits and subsidies to noncitizens of our Country, denaturalize migrants who undermine domestic tranquility, and deport any Foreign National who is a public charge, security risk, or non-compatible with Western Civilization. These goals will be pursued with the aim of achieving a major reduction in illegal and disruptive populations, including those admitted through an unauthorized and illegal Autopen approval process. Only REVERSE MIGRATION can fully cure this situation. Other than that, HAPPY THANKSGIVING TO ALL, except those that hate, steal, murder, and destroy everything that America stands for — You won’t be here for long!

Hours later, the US homeland security department posted on Twitter: "The stakes have never been higher, and the goal has never been more clear: Remigration now."

Spencer Ackerman and Dave Zirin have both described the attack as a case of "imperial blowback"—political violence as an unintended consequence of US covert operations in Afghanistan.

== See also ==
- Anti-Afghan sentiment
- Deportation of Afghan immigrants from the United States
- 2025 Capital Jewish Museum shooting − Similar incident that occurred in Washington, D.C., in May 2025
- List of incidents of political violence in Washington, D.C.
