= Trial of Sean Dunn =

2025 prosecution in Washington, D.C.

United States v. Dunn
- Seal of the United States District Court for the District of Columbia
- Court: United States District Court for the District of Columbia
- Decided: November 6, 2025
- Docket nos.: 1:25-cr-00252

Court membership
- Judge sitting: Carl J. Nichols

On November 6, 2025, Sean Charles Dunn, popularly nicknamed Sandwich Guy, was acquitted by a jury in the United States District Court for the District of Columbia on the charge of assaulting or impeding a federal officer for throwing a Subway sandwich at a U.S. Customs and Border Protection agent in Washington, D.C.

== Background and incident ==
On August 7, 2025, Donald Trump ordered hundreds of federal law enforcement agents from over one dozen federal agencies to patrol the streets of Washington, D.C., after the Department of Government Efficiency staffer Edward Coristine was assaulted in an attempted carjacking days earlier. The deployment began early in the morning of August 8.

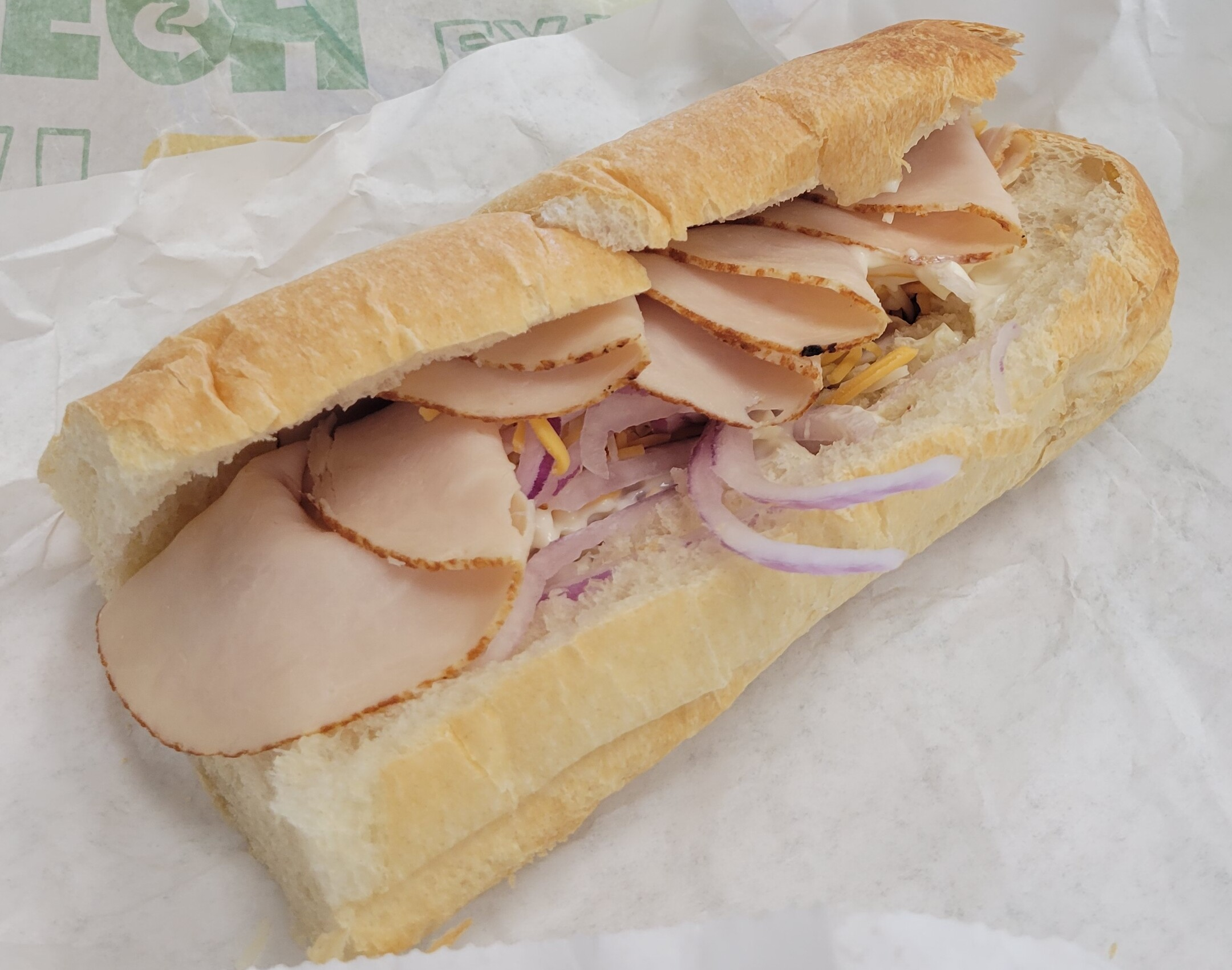
An example of a Subway turkey sandwich

Late at night on August 10, Sean Charles Dunn—then a 37-year-old paralegal with the Office of International Affairs in the United States Department of Justice Criminal Division—began yelling at several U.S. Customs and Border Protection agents stationed on the corner of 14th and U Street, Northwest. Dunn called the agents "fascists" and "racists" and shouted "Why are you here? I don't want you in my city!" Dunn then crossed the street, returned, threw a Subway footlong turkey sandwich (Note: News reports at the time incorrectly characterized it as a salami sandwich.) at U.S. Customs and Border Protection officer Greg Lairmore, and ran away; he was then arrested. Attorney General Pam Bondi announced soon afterwards that Dunn had been fired, claiming he was part of the "Deep State".

== Prosecution and trial ==
Prosecutors with the office of the United States Attorney for the District of Columbia initially charged Dunn with felony assault. A group of twenty armed federal agents arrested Dunn at his home on August 13, 2025; Dunn's lawyer said that the government did not give Dunn an opportunity to surrender himself. The Trump administration later released a promotional video of Dunn's arrest on social media. After an arrest, federal prosecutors typically have 30 days to convince a grand jury to file an indictment. Grand juries almost always agree to indict, because only a simple majority has to agree, the evidentiary threshold is low, the rules of evidence are limited, and the proceedings are secret. However, D.C. residents have strongly opposed the deployment of federal troops to Washington, and the Trump administration had been seeking unusually severe charges for incidents in connection to it. On August 27, the grand jury refused to indict Dunn; days before, another grand jury had refused to indict Sidney Reid on felony charges also related to the deployment. Dunn was instead charged with the misdemeanor offense of assaulting or impeding a federal officer under 18 U.S.C. § 111(a)(1). He pled not guilty at his arraignment on September 10.

The prosecution and defense argued for different interpretations of the statute Dunn was charged under, which makes it illegal to "forcibly assault, ... impede, ... or interfere with" a government official "while engaged in or on account of the performance of official duties". The defense argued that the terms and their definitions should only apply to contact that causes substantial physical harm, while the government argued for a broader interpretation. Judge Carl J. Nichols held in the jury instructions that "touching offensive to a person of reasonable sensibilities" can constitute "injury", an essential component of the definitions of "assault" and "forcibly". The defense filed a motion to dismiss for selective prosecution, but it was not ruled on before the beginning of the trial.

The trial began on November 4. Assistant United States Attorney (AUSA) John Parron – representing the government along with AUSA Michael DiLorenzo – gave the opening arguments, saying, "no matter who you are, you can't just go around throwing stuff at people because you're mad", adding, "that's just something you can't do". Julia Gatto, representing Dunn along with Sabrina Shroff, began her opening arguments by conceding the main facts of the case: "he did it, he threw the sandwich." Gatto argued that the act did not rise to the level of assault, saying, "you're not going to be asked if you feel bad for the agent who took a sandwich to the chest. You're going to be asked whether what happened that night is a federal crime." She said that it was not an assault, only "an exclamation mark at the end of a verbal outburst" protected by the First Amendment to the U.S. Constitution.

That day, the government called Lairmore, the victim, to the witness stand. He said that he could feel the impact through his ballistic vest and "the sandwich kind of exploded all over [his] uniform ... it smelled of onions and mustard". He said that he had "mustard and condiments on my uniform, and an onion hanging from my radio antenna that night". The courtroom broke into laughter hearing the testimony, including several jurors who were trying not to; one juror told The Atlantic, "it was like, 'oh, you poor baby'". On cross-examination, Shroff showed a picture of the sandwich after being thrown, still mostly intact and in the wrapper; she claimed to the contrary that "that sandwich hasn't exploded at all". Trying to show that the incident was not a serious assault, Shroff also questioned Lairmore on the gag gifts he received in the aftermath of the event, some of which he displayed in his office, like a sandwich plushie.

The next day saw closing arguments from both sides; DiLorenzo, arguing for the prosecution, said that "this is not a case about someone with strong opinions ... it's about an individual who crossed the line." Shroff argued in return that "a footlong from Subway could not and certainly did not inflict any bodily harm ... throwing a sandwich is not a forcible offense." The jury deliberated for around two hours before adjourning for the day. On November 6, the jury returned a verdict of not guilty after deliberating for around seven hours in total.

== Responses ==
Dunn's act of throwing the sandwich and his prosecution evoked defiance and mockery from the D.C. public against the administration. Dunn, who came to be known as "Sandwich Guy", was described as a folk hero and a symbol of resistance. After the video of the incident went viral, people shared memes and created art, including street art in the style of Banksy's Flower Thrower. People also held Subway sandwiches in the air at protests in D.C., referred to the incident in protest signs, and sold products commemorating the incident online. NPR wrote that the case "has come to symbolize how many in the nation's capital feel about the Trump administration's surge of federal law enforcement to the city". The Washington Post called the acquittal "the highest-profile repudiation to date of Pirro's efforts to ratchet up penalties for local offenses".

Commentators criticized the Trump administration and the United States Attorney for the District of Columbia, Jeanine Pirro for the prosecution. Mark Joseph Stern said that the prosecution was vindictive and an "extraordinary federal overreach". Dahlia Lithwick, agreeing with Stern, said that the jury's verdict was a moment that "vindicates truth-telling". The MSNBC columnist Barbara McQuade wrote that the prosecution was "downright lawless" because the facts of the case did not fit the charged offense and that it was a waste of limited federal resources. Clarence Page in his column for the Chicago Tribune said that the case was an example of the Trump administration's failed immigration enforcement effort, which created disorder.

Several commentators also compared the prosecution to the adage that a prosecutor can persuade a grand jury to "indict a ham sandwich". In Reason, Joe Lancaster cited the case as an example of grand juries "providing a check against prosecutors overcharging minor offenses". Mark Joseph Stern said that the grand jury's refusal to indict appeared to be an instance of jury nullification, stating that "a grand jury will typically indict a ham sandwich, but it turns out a D.C. grand jury won't indict the guy who threw the sandwich." Clarence Page wrote that prosecutors not only failed to indict a ham sandwich, but failed to convict it on a lesser offense.
