= Targeting of political opponents and civil society under the second Trump administration =

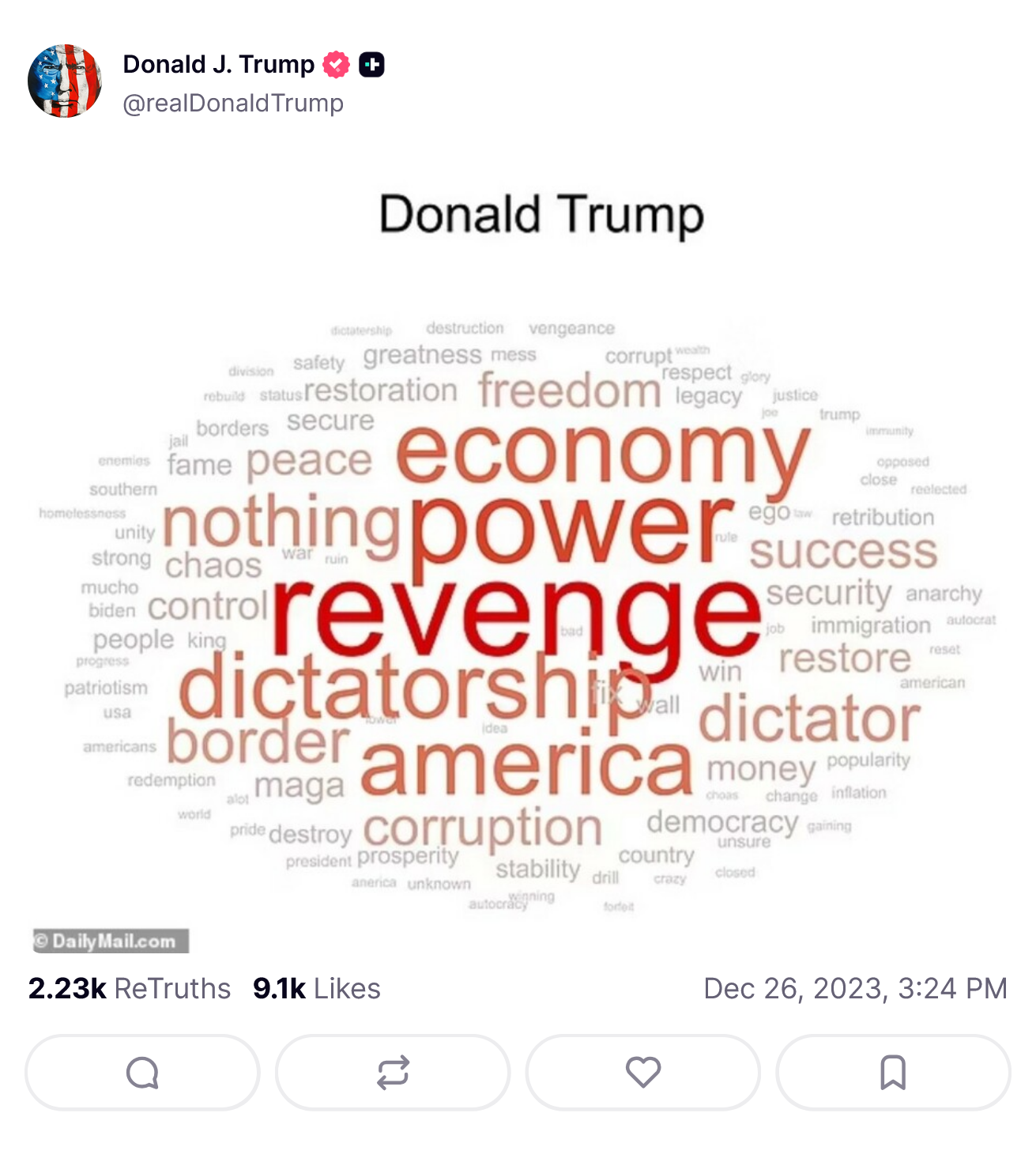
In 2023, Donald Trump posted a wordcloud to his Truth Social account summarizing a Daily Mail poll of 1,000 likely voters and what words they associated with him for his second term.

During Donald Trump's second presidency, the Trump administration has undertaken a series of actions using the government to target his political opponents and civil society. News outlets described his actions as part of his promised "retribution" and "revenge" campaign, within the context of a strongly personalist and leader-centered conception of politics. During his 2024 presidential campaign, Trump repeatedly stated that he had "every right" to go after his political opponents.

He undertook a massive expansion of presidential power under a maximalist interpretation of the unitary executive theory. Several of his actions ignored or violated federal laws, regulations, and the Constitution according to American legal scholars, the Government Accountability Office, and federal judges. He threatened, signed executive actions against, and ordered investigations into his political opponents, his critics, and organizations aligned with the Democratic Party. He politicized the civil service, undertaking mass layoffs of government employees to recruit workers more loyal to himself. He ended the post-Watergate norm of Justice Department independence, weaponizing it and ordering it to target his political enemies. He utilized several government agencies to retaliate against his political enemies and continued filing personal lawsuits against his political opponents, companies, and news organizations that angered him.

By July 2025, Trump had extracted more than $1.2 billion in settlements in a "cultural crackdown" against a variety of institutions that largely chose to settle rather than fight back. He engaged in an unprecedented targeting of law firms and lawyers that previously represented positions adverse to himself. Trump targeted higher education by demanding it give federal oversight of curriculum and targeted activists, legal immigrants, tourists, and students with visas who expressed criticism of his policies or engaged in pro-Palestinian advocacy. He also detained and deported United States citizens.

Trump's actions against civil society have been described by legal experts and political scientists as authoritarian and contributing to democratic backsliding, as well as negatively impacting freedom of the press, free speech, and the rule of law.

== Background ==
In 2024, the Supreme Court of the United States ruled that the president has a presumption of immunity for all "official acts".

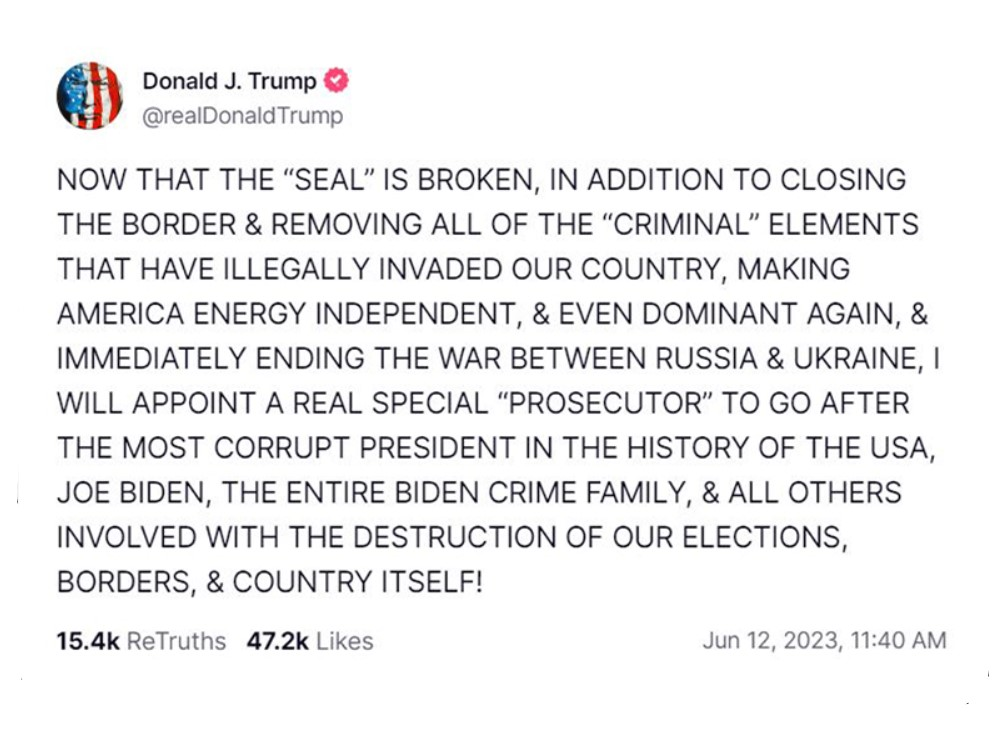
A Trump post on Truth Social dated June 2023, in which he condemns the U.S. Justice Department for supposedly targeting him, and vows to go after political opponents

Trump frequently promised to exact retribution against perceived political enemies through his 2024 campaign, and has said he has "every right" to go after political opponents. A central campaign theme for Trump's second presidential bid was "retribution". Trump framed the 2024 election as "the final battle", and openly promised to leverage the power of the presidency for political reprisals.

Before the 2024 election, Trump repeatedly suggested that he supports outlawing political dissent that he regards as misleading or that questions the legitimacy of his presidency, for example saying that criticism of judges who ruled in favor of him "should be punishable by very serious fines and beyond that." He also repeatedly called for media companies who have produced unfavorable coverage of him to have their licenses revoked, and said that he would jail reporters who refuse to name the sources of leaks. Upon his inauguration, The New York Times described Trump as using "grievance as a political tool, portraying himself as the victim of what he claims is a powerful and amorphous 'deep state.'"

In late November 2025, ten months into his second presidency, Reuters counted 470 people, organizations, and institutions that Trump had already targeted for retribution.

== Actions taken ==
=== Mass firings and expansion of presidential power ===
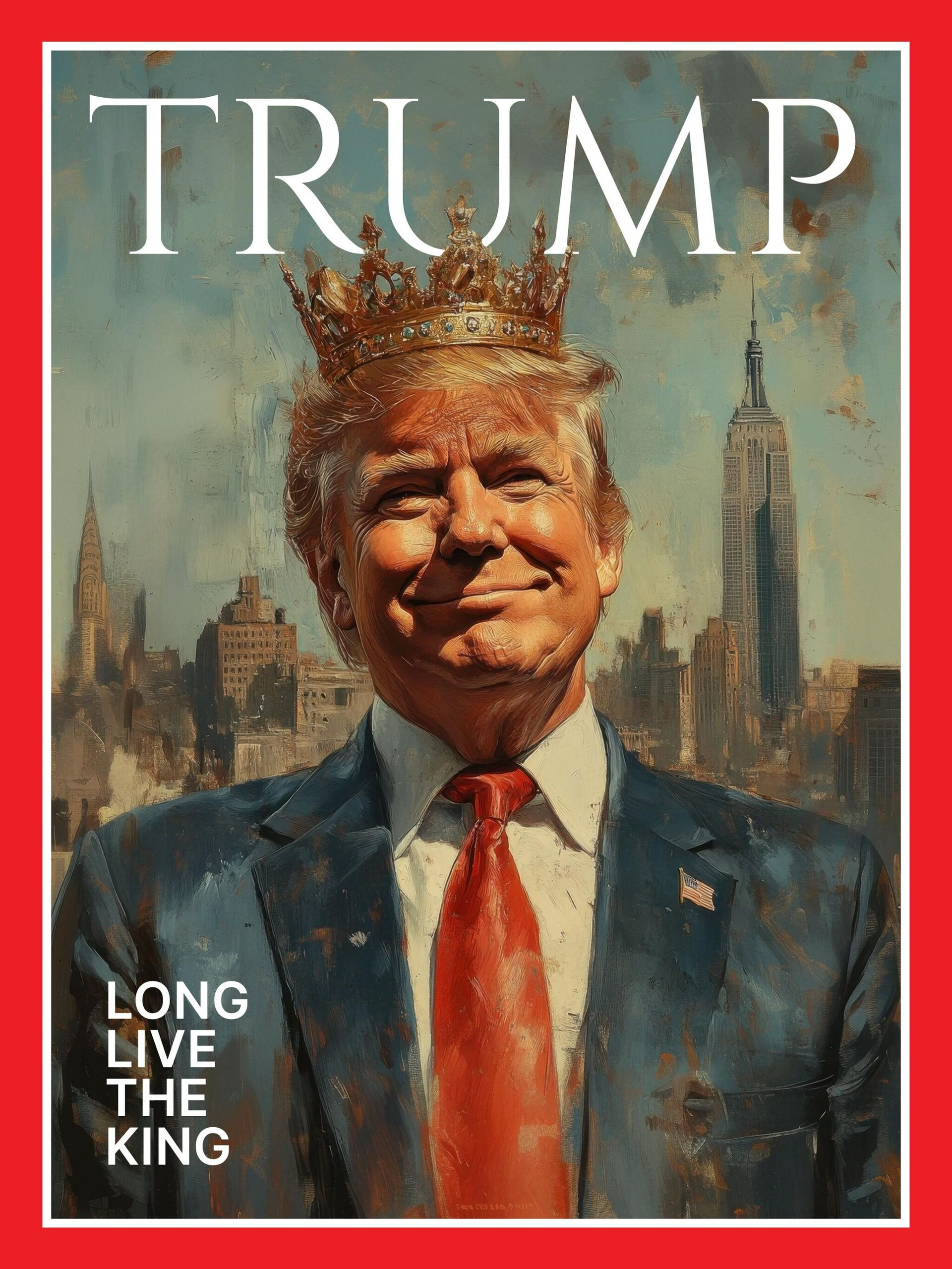
During his second presidency, White House social media posted an AI-generated image depicting Trump as a king, and Trump and his allies referred to him with monarchical terminology and claims of divine legitimacy.

Trump undertook mass firings of federal employees, inspectors general, and Democratic members of independent agencies and oversight boards who could attempt to block or constrain his moves, in express defiance of existing laws prohibiting such actions. His actions were described by legal experts as unprecedented or in violation of federal law, and with the intent of replacing them with workers more aligned with his agenda. In a peer-reviewed journal article, Donald Moynihan described the exercise as an anti-statist restructuring of American government centered around political loyalty. Legal analysts described such firings as setting up Supreme Court cases that could expand his power over independent executive branch agencies that Congress set up to be insulated from presidential control based on a maximalist interpretation of the unitary executive theory. His actions removed checks and balances within the executive branch by ignoring agencies such as the Office of Legal Counsel.

In an executive order on February 18, Trump declared the executive branch an extension of his own person, and that only he and the United States Attorney General had final say on the interpretation of all executive branch law. He sent teams to administer loyalty tests to some federal employees, intelligence, and law enforcement candidates. His actions politicized the civil service, especially among law enforcement. His actions against civil society were described by legal experts and hundreds of political scientists as authoritarian and contributing to democratic backsliding, and as negatively impacting the rule of law.

=== Launching Justice Department investigations ===
There's a big difference between saying we will always do our job and investigate any case and act independently of the White House. No, I'm not going to pledge that. And no attorney general should ever pledge that.

— Attorney General Todd Blanche during an NBC News interview with Kristen Welker in August 2026.

Trump ended the post-Watergate norm of independence for the Department of Justice (DOJ) and weaponized it to investigate his political opponents, calling them "scum". His administration publicized actions against local leaders, judges, and federal officials who opposed his agenda, along with what The New York Times described as "people who have simply gotten on the president's bad side" in an attempt to stigmatize them. Trump made numerous suggestions, requests and demands to jail, arrest, investigate or prosecute his political opponents, including by explicitly or indirectly ordering investigations into political opponents and celebrities such as James Comey, Beyoncé, Oprah Winfrey, Bruce Springsteen, Chris Krebs. Trump's interim DC Attorney General Ed Martin and head of the Weaponization Working Group stated the Justice Department would publicly name and shame individuals they did not have sufficient evidence to prosecute. Legal experts described this approach as violating the department's ethical and procedural rulebook, and that many of his other actions publicizing investigations were "so outside the bounds that it could undermine any criminal case".

Trump used the Justice Department to punish his enemies and reward his allies while making unfounded claims of prior "weaponization" against him. Trump ordered the attorney general to investigate the Biden administration for "weaponization of the federal government" and "government censorship of speech". The Guardian described the investigations as "politically charged reviews into his personal grievances". The orders made misleading accusations against the Biden administration and asserted they had committed criminal conduct against him and his supporters and demanded evidence be found to "correct past misconduct".

On January 27, the DOJ fired more than a dozen officials who worked on criminal cases against Trump, alleging a lack of trust in faithfully executing his agenda. It also announced a "special project" to investigate prosecutors who had previously brought charges against January 6 United States Capitol attack rioters, and launched a "weaponization working group" to review and investigate officials at both the state and federal levels who previously investigated Trump and provide the White House quarterly reports on its findings. Several FBI agents and the FBI Agents Association sued the Trump administration to prevent the publication of the names of 5,000 FBI agents for their involvement in investigating the January 6 attack, and Trump later said he would fire some agents involved in investigating the attack. FBI agents involved in securing indictments against Trump or viewed as aligned with his political enemies were ultimately fired, and the FBI Agents Association criticized the actions as "a campaign of erratic and arbitrary retribution".

On March 14, 2025, Trump gave a norm-breaking political speech at the Justice Department's Great Hall, promising to "expose" his enemies in what The Associated Press described as "the latest manifestation of Trump's unparalleled takeover of the department". The Economist described Trump as "paying a price for erasing any expectation the department would operate independently" in reducing its credibility in its response to the Epstein files. Foreign diplomats described the Justice Department's seeming politicization, as well as the apparent decline of the rule of law and integrity of the US legal system, as potentially complicating transnational criminal investigations. By August 4, The New York Times reported that judges had increasingly doubted "the fundamental honesty and credibility of Justice Department lawyers in ways that would have been unthinkable only months ago" following instances of the Justice Department having "repeatedly misled the courts, violated their orders and demonized judges who have ruled against them".

On June 5, 2025, Trump ordered his administration to investigate former President Joe Biden for his executive actions, arguing he was too mentally impaired to do the job and casting doubts as to the legitimacy of his pardons, although Trump admitted he had no evidence to back up his claims. Legal experts described the investigation as unlikely to do anything except fire up his core supporters.

In April 2026, Trump fired Attorney General Pam Bondi following dissatisfaction at her lack of successes prosecuting his political opponents, according to NBC News. In an April 2026 interview with NBC, Trump's former criminal defense attorney and then-Acting Attorney General Todd Blanche stated that Americans should be "happy" Trump was deeply involved in the DOJ, describing Trump as "my boss" and saying that probes into his political opponents would continue as "they involve individuals that the president has had significant issues — for good reason, by the way, within the past that will continue the rest of the time he's president". In August 2026, after his Senate confirmation as Attorney General, Blanche refused to pledge the DOJ would act independently of the White House, saying that "[t]here's a big difference between saying we will always do our job and investigate any case and act independently of the White House" and that "[n]o, I'm not going to pledge that" and that "no attorney general should ever pledge that." Blanche denied that Trump asked him to prosecute specific individuals and said the president would never ask him to do something unethical or illegal.

==== Interagency Weaponization Working Group ====
On October 20, Reuters reported the existence of wide-ranging group of officials across the government and intelligence agencies investigating Trump's claims of a "deep state" against him. Trump administration officials later confirmed the existence of the group, came the Interagency Weaponization Working Group (IWWG). It included officials from the White House, the Office of the Director of National Intelligence, the Central Intelligence Agency, the Justice and Defense Departments, the Federal Bureau of Investigation, the Department of Homeland Security, the Internal Revenue Service, and the Federal Communications Commission, among other agencies. Reuters identified over 39 individuals involved in the group consisting of vocal Trump supporters, intelligence officers, individuals who promoted Trump's false 2020 election fraud claims, opposed COVID-19 vaccine mandates, and ex-January 6 rioters. ODNI official Paul McNamara was described as a key figure in Tulsi Gabbard's Directors Initiatives Group (DIG), which was described as working with the IWWG and multiple other, smaller weaponization working groups in a variety of federal agencies. Reported topics discussed by the IWWG included scrutinizing prosecutions of former Trump officials and aides, prosecuting a variety of Trump critics and current and former officials viewed negatively by the Trump administration, the Jeffrey Epstein files, purging officials involved in former criminal cases against Trump, and stripping security clearances from transgender U.S. officials. The group allegedly sought to infiltrate the classified SIPRNet and Joint Worldwide Intelligence Communications System to search for proof of an anti-Trump "deep state". Reuters described the group's existence as indicating "the administration's push to deploy government power against Trump's perceived foes is broader and more systematic than previously reported". As a result of Reuters' reporting, hundreds of former U.S. national security officials urged Congress to investigate the IWWG.

=== Persecutions of political opponents ===
Avatar of Donald J. Trump

Donald J. Trump
(@realDonaldTrump)
tweeted:

Pam: I have reviewed over 30 statements and posts saying that, essentially, “same old story as last time, all talk, no action. Nothing is being done. What about Comey, Adam “Shifty” Schiff, Leticia??? They’re all guilty as hell, but nothing is going to be done.” Then we almost put in a Democrat supported U.S. Attorney, in Virginia, with a really bad Republican past. A Woke RINO, who was never going to do his job. That’s why two of the worst Dem Senators PUSHED him so hard. He even lied to the media and said he quit, and that we had no case. No, I fired him, and there is a GREAT CASE, and many lawyers, and legal pundits, say so. Lindsey Halligan is a really good lawyer, and likes you, a lot. We can’t delay any longer, it’s killing our reputation and credibility. They impeached me twice, and indicted me (5 times!), OVER NOTHING. JUSTICE MUST BE SERVED, NOW!!! President DJT

September 20, 2025

On the evening of September 21, 2025, Trump posted multiple messages on his Truth Social account encouraging and directing Pam Bondi to prosecute his political opponents, specifically calling out Senator Adam Schiff, former FBI Director James Comey, and New York Attorney General Letitia James. Trump stated the lack of prosecutions was "killing our reputation and credibility". The majority of the posts involved criticizing Erik Siebert, a Justice Department official who reportedly stated there was not enough evidence to launch a prosecution against Letitia James, appearing to confirm reports of such comments. He also said he would promote Lindsey Halligan, his personal aide with no prosecutorial experience with taking on the case. Politico described the response as a "remarkable public message to the nation's top law enforcement officer, linking his personal grievances over his own criminal prosecutions and congressional impeachments to a potential decision by federal prosecutors to level criminal charges against his adversaries." On September 25, Halligan charged Comey five days before the statute of limitations expired. The New York Times described the prosecution as a dramatic expansion of presidential power that could chill public dissent, a result of an emboldened Trump from his Supreme Court immunity ruling, and that it "could well go down as a moment when a fundamental democratic norm — that justice is dispensed without regard to political or personal agendas — was cast aside in a dangerous way". On November 5, Judge William Fitzpatrick berated prosecutors' handling of the Comey case, stating they had taken an "indict first, investigate second" approach.

On October 15, while in front of AG Pam Bondi, Deputy Todd Blanche, and FBI Director Kash Patel in the Oval Office, Trump called on further prosecutions into Jack Smith, the special counsel who brought two criminal indictments against him; Andrew Weissmann, a former F.B.I. official who was involved in investigations into Russian interference in the 2016 United States elections; and Lisa Monaco, the deputy attorney general under President Joe Biden. Trump stated: "Deranged Jack Smith, in my opinion, is a criminal. His interviewer was Weissmann — I hope they're going to look into Weissmann, too — Weissmann's a bad guy. And he had somebody, Lisa, who was his puppet, worked in the office, really, as the top person. I think she should be looked at very strongly."

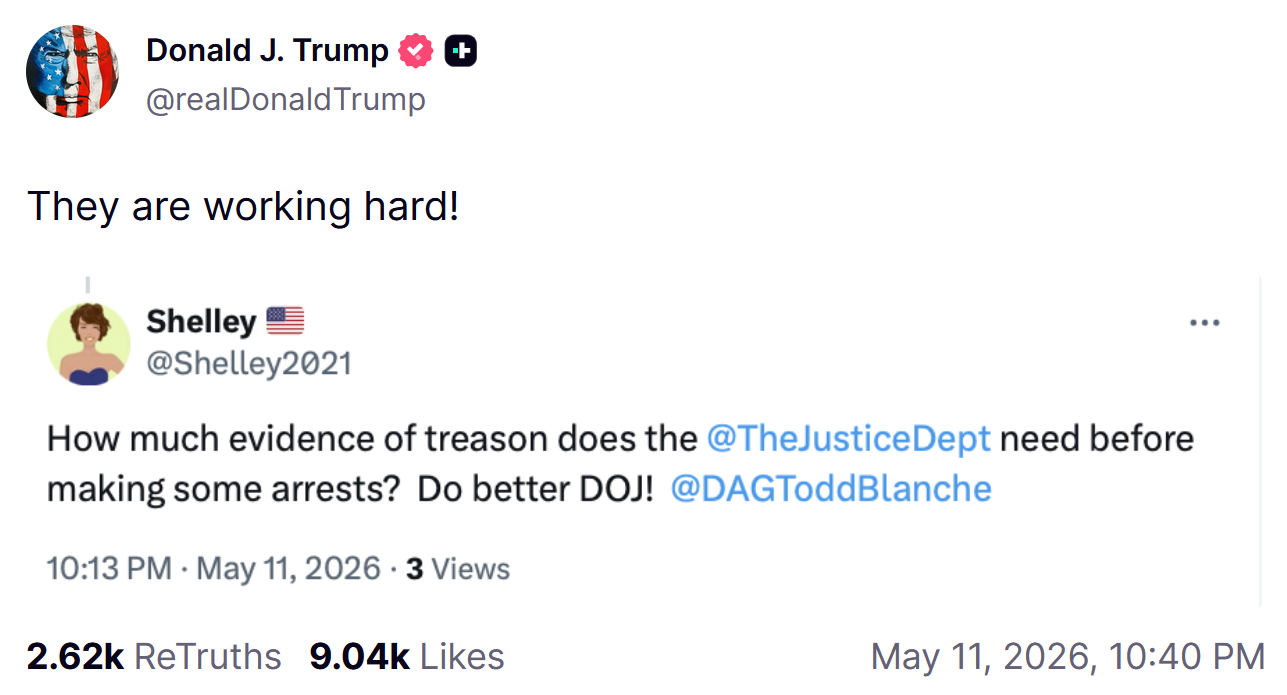
A Truth Social post by Trump on May 11, 2026

By late 2025, Trump loyalists increasingly alleged without evidence a "Grand Conspiracy" against Trump involving a supposed cabal of Democrats and "deep state" operatives led by Barack Obama that sought to destroy Trump dating back to his 2016 campaign. Promoted by Trump and his supporters, the narrative emerged in a widening federal investigation by Trump-appointed U.S. attorney Jason Reding Quiñones, who issued over two dozen subpoenas including individuals such as James R. Clapper Jr., Peter Strzok, and Lisa Page. The inquiry was transferred to Quiñones after veteran prosecutor David Metcalf reportedly struggled to advance a previous case that was viewed as weak by current and former department officials against ex-CIA chief John Brennan. Trump loyalist and former Trump campaign lawyer Joe diGenova was later placed in charge of the investigation after the departure of career prosecutor Maria Medetis who objected to moving forward with the charges.

The administration opened investigations into Jerome Powell, Tim Walz, Jacob Frey and prosecuted LaMonica McIver. The Trump administration also opened investigations into political opponents Gavin Newsom, Jennifer Siebel Newsom, George Soros, Alexander Soros, Jack Smith, John Brennan, E. Jean Carroll, Reid Hoffman, Miles Taylor, and Christopher Krebs.

Following six representatives' involvement in a video advising service members not to carry out illegal orders, the administration investigated the representatives. On February 10th, 2026, the Washington U.S. attorney’s office in Washington sought to indict all six, but failed to convince the grand jury of the charges.

In April 2026, it was reported that Tulsi Gabbard sent criminal referrals to the Justice Department for a whistleblower in the 2019 Trump–Ukraine scandal and Inspector General Michael Atkinson. In May 2026, it was reported that the administration opened a criminal investigation into E. Jean Carroll. The same month CNN said "at this point it’s difficult to find a legal matter involving Trump where his DOJ hasn’t tried probing principal actors involved." NOTUS reported that the FBI had a "payback squad" which "is understood to be made up of agents who are willing to pursue political targets set by the Trump administration".

In July 2026, it was reported that Trump told a White House advisor that he didn't care whether the prosecution of James was successful and that the only purpose was to drag James into court. "I want to make her life miserable," Trump reportedly told the advisor.

==== Investigating Democratic and liberal organizations ====
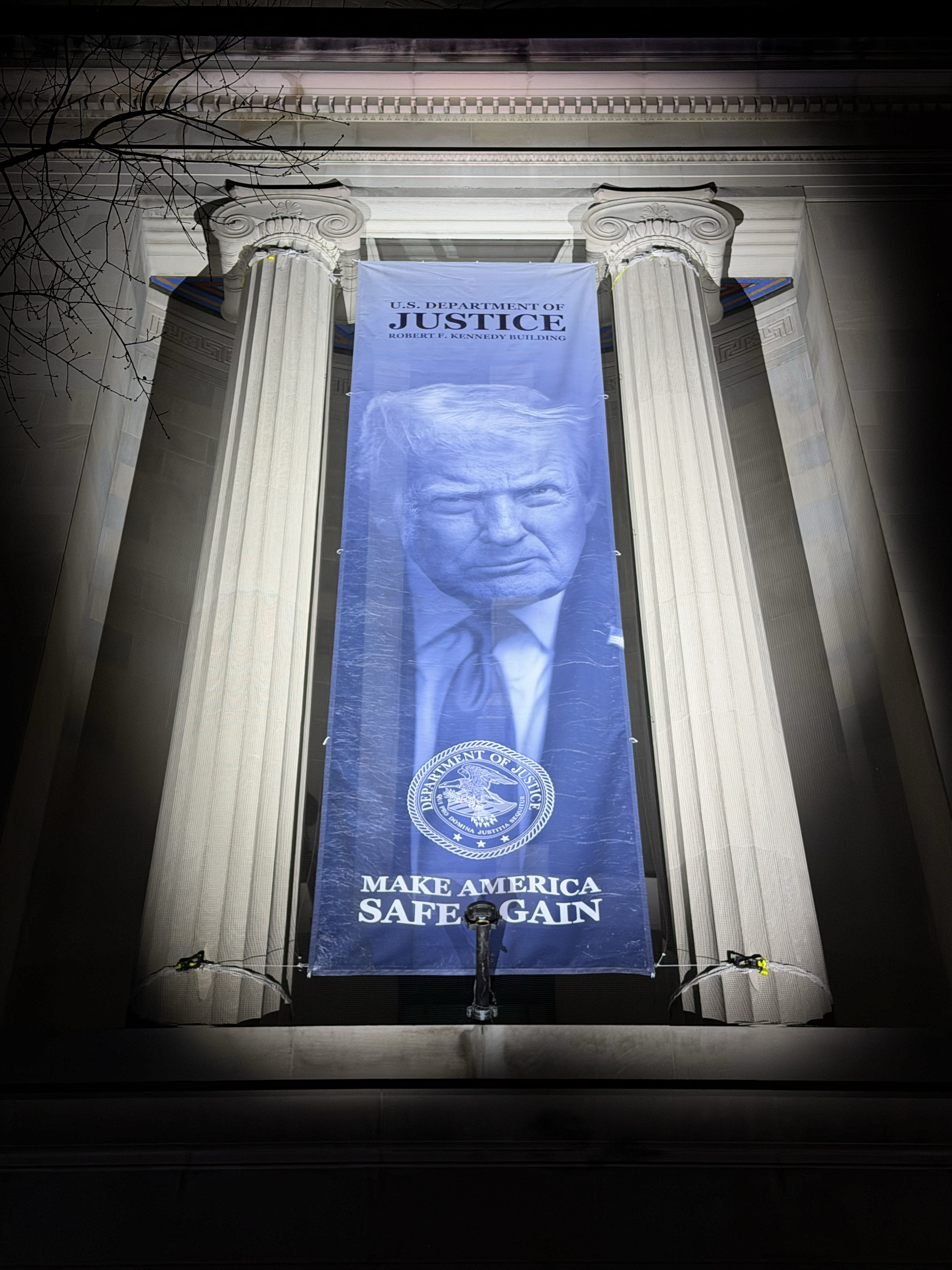
A banner of Donald Trump hanging at the Robert F. Kennedy Department of Justice Building in February 2026

Trump threatened, signed executive actions, and ordered investigations into his political opponents, critics, and organizations aligned with the Democratic Party. On April 24, 2025, Trump directed the Justice Department in a presidential memorandum to investigate the Democratic fundraising platform ActBlue in an attempt to cripple the Democratic Party's political infrastructure. It marked the third time in three weeks Trump ordered the government to target his perceived enemies and domestic opponents, which The New York Times described as "eroding a post-Watergate norm of Justice Department independence far more than he ever did in his first term".

Following the assassination of Charlie Kirk in September 2025, the Trump administration announced a widespread crackdown of liberal groups and donors, claiming without evidence that a network of liberal organizations promoted violence and would be dismantled. Trump stated he was looking into labeling some "terrorist organizations", and JD Vance promised to go after non-profits such as the Open Society Foundations and the Ford Foundation that had provided financial support for liberal and progressive causes. Critics widely condemned the moves, and warned the administration was using the assassination as a pretext to crack down on political opponents. On September 25, the Justice Department directed more than a half dozen U.S. prosecutors to cast charges against Open Society Foundations by listing possible charges to bring, ranging from arson to material support for terrorism.

On September 20, Trump signed an executive order designating "Antifa" a "domestic terrorist organization" (though Antifa is a movement without a single central organization), which (unlike State Department designation of foreign terrorist organizations) was criticized as exceeding his legal authority and possibly violating the First Amendment.

The Trump administration ignored or downplayed cases of right-wing violence and described left wing groups and their supporters as "domestic terrorists". Studies have shown right-wing terrorism is the cause of most political violence in the contemporary United States.

On October 9, Reuters reported on a wide-ranging multi-agency plan by the Trump administration to crack down on liberal non-profits and groups opposed to his agenda with Trump aide Stephen Miller playing a key role. Reuters described the plan as involving America's counter-terrorism apparatus including the FBI, the Department of Homeland Security, the Justice Department, as well as the Internal Revenue Service and the Treasury Department. Miller was described as taking a "hands-on role" as Trump's "chief advisor" on the issue, with Miller receiving regular updates and sharing recommendations with Attorney General Pam Bondi and Treasury Secretary Scott Bessent. The plan involved investigations into "domestic terror networks" which include nonprofits and educational institutions, with Trump directing the National Joint Terrorism Task Force to focus on groups promoting "anti-Americanism, anti-capitalism, and anti-Christianity". Targets included major Democratic donors George Soros, Reid Hoffman, along with organizations Open Society Foundations, ActBlue, Indivisible, the Coalition for Humane Immigrant Rights, IfNotNow, and Jewish Voice for Peace. Reuters described potential tools "to defund or shut down these groups include IRS investigations to strip them of tax-exempt status; criminal probes by the Justice Department and FBI; surveillance by federal law enforcement agencies; the use of RICO statutes typically used for organized crime and financial investigations under anti-terror laws to identify donors and funders". Nixon presidential historian Timothy Naftali described the persecution of liberal groups as similar to Nixon's desire to punish political enemies and critics, but that a pliant-Republican Congress allowed Trump to go further and described "this particular moment is more dangerous for the rule of law in the United States than the 1970s were".

In November 2025, Trump called for ICE to ignore court orders and for the executions of prominent Democrats.

In April 2026, the DOJ indicted the Southern Poverty Law Center (SPLC) for wire fraud, conspiracy to commit money laundering, and other financial crimes, citing its former use of paid informants, during 2014–2023, to infiltrate far-right activist groups, including the Ku Klux Klan and the National Socialist Party of America. Acting Attorney General Todd Blanche accused the SPLC of "manufacturing racism to justify its existence."

In August 2026, The New York Times reported that four days after the killing of Alex Pretti in January 2026, the Department of Homeland Security opened a broad investigation into a variety of left-leaning groups under the authority of National Security Presidential Memorandum-7, which enhanced investigations and prosecution against alleged left-wing extremists that had been criticized by civil rights groups for overly broad terminology. The Times reported that the investigation utilized a variety of "invasive tactics" against labor unions, environmental groups, and socialist collectives who were never accused of a crime as part of the investigation, which was known internally as Operation Puppet Master. It highlighted the use of undercover agents infiltrating groups with "tenuous connections" online and in libraries, parks, and churches; obtaining years of financial records; and writing down names, license plate numbers, and political opinions. The investigations were compared to the FBI COINTELPRO program run against leftist groups in the 1950's to 70's.

In September 2026, Democrat and Squad member Ilhan Omar came under investigation by Department of Homeland Security border czar Tom Homan for allegations relating to embezzlement and immigration.

==== Eric Adams investigation ====
It was reported on February 14 that the efforts by Trump to dismiss the case into New York City Mayor Eric Adams, which caused the resignation of seven government prosecutors, came in the same week as the administration was negotiating with the mayor over immigration enforcement initiatives and Trump's "border czar" Tom Homan made reference to an "agreement". Earlier, Adams had agreed with Homan to give access to the city's Rikers Island jail for Immigration and Customs Enforcement (ICE) without—via a "loophole ... [Adams] appears to have found"—violating the city’s sanctuary laws, and joined Homan in a joint interview conducted by Phil McGraw, among one or more other joint interviews.

The report came after February 10, 2025, when the DOJ under Trump instructed federal prosecutors to drop charges against Adams, citing concerns that the case had been affected by publicity and was interfering with his ability to govern. The memo directing this move, written by acting Deputy Attorney General Emil Bove, stated that the prosecution had limited Adams' capacity to focus on issues such as immigration and crime. The Justice Department's decision did not assess the strength of the evidence or legal arguments in the case. The memo was issued months before the city's Democratic primary, where Adams is seeking reelection. The charges were to be dropped "as soon as is practicable" pending a further review of Adams' case following the general election in November 2025. Danielle Sassoon, the US attorney in charge of the case, refused to dismiss the charges, telling Attorney General Pam Bondi that "I cannot agree to seek a dismissal driven by improper considerations". Sassoon later resigned, accusing Bove and the Trump administration of making an illicit deal with Adams to dismiss the charges, becoming the first of seven prosecutors to resign due to the order to dismiss charges.

==== Mortgage investigations ====
The administration investigated political rivals such as Lisa Cook, Letitia James, Adam Schiff, and Eric Swalwell for alleged mortgage fraud. The investigations were launched after Trump and his administration repeatedly criticized the individuals and called on Cook to resign from her post on the Federal Reserve in order to appoint a new board member. NBC News described investigations into alleged mortgage fraud as a common tactic in opposition research for political campaigns according to veteran Republican campaign operatives, and stated it was unclear if the administration was also pursuing mortgage fraud allegations against Texas Republican Ken Paxton. The administration stated the investigations were made without political interference.

=== Targeting the judicial system and judges ===
Beginning in October 2025, The New York Times editorial board published an Autocracy Index showing erosion of US democracy using various benchmarks, offering "a way to understand how much Mr. Trump is eroding American democracy" since his January 2025 inauguration.

Following legal setbacks to his executive orders, Trump increased his criticism of the judiciary and called for impeachment of federal judges who ruled against him. By mid-July, a Washington Post analysis found he defied judges and the courts in roughly one third of all cases against him, actions which were described by legal experts as unprecedented for any presidential administration and threatened to undermine the judiciary's role in checking executive power. It described the Trump administration as providing false information, stonewalling judges, flouting court orders, presenting legal cases with no basis in the law and misrepresenting facts.

His defiance of court orders and a claimed right to disobey the courts raised fears among legal experts of a constitutional crisis. He engaged in an unprecedented targeting of law firms and lawyers that previously represented positions adverse to himself. His verbal attacks against the judiciary saw an increase in threats and harassment against judges and their families who ruled against him. On April 25, 2025, the FBI arrested Milwaukee County Circuit judge Hannah Dugan for allegedly blocking immigration enforcement. The move was widely characterized as an authoritarian act by legal experts. His actions were described by scholars as potentially creating a "two-track legal system" or "dual state".

On June 24, 2025, Trump sued all 15 federal judges in Maryland in a dispute over his deportation orders in an escalation of his conflict with the judiciary. On July 28, Attorney General Pam Bondi filed a misconduct complaint against Chief Judge James Boasberg for allegedly violating the presumption of regularity in what Politico described as part of a political effort "to cast as rogue partisans federal judges who have blocked President Donald Trump's priorities".

During his second presidency, Trump bypassed the Senate and the Courts to install loyalist prosecutors through the use of loopholes in federal law. Trump appointed prosecutors on an "interim" 120 day basis, voided the court-ordered replacement or preempted them, then re-installed them as an "acting" attorney for an additional 210 days. Notably on July 29, Trump fired Acting Attorney for New Jersey Desiree Leigh Grace in favor of his personal attorney, Alina Habba, despite the expiration of Habba's 120-day appointment.

Trump and his administration targeted and condemned judges globally who were involved in trials against his political allies such as in Brazil, France, Israel and Britain, arguing that they were biased and suppressing free speech rights. According to scholars in constitutional law and democracy, the rebukes "violate long-standing diplomatic norms, challenge a key tenet of national sovereignty, and signify a potential retreat from the United States' long-standing approach of promoting the independent rule of law in other democracies".

=== Using government agencies for reprisals ===
Upon taking office, Trump weaponized a variety of government agencies to target and harass his political rivals. An NPR analysis found that in his first 100 days, he utilized the departments of Justice, Defense, Homeland Security, Education, Health and Human Services, the IRS, the General Services Administration, the Federal Communications Commission, the Office of the Director of National Intelligence, the Equal Employment Opportunity Commission and the Federal Housing Finance Agency to retaliate and harass his opponents.

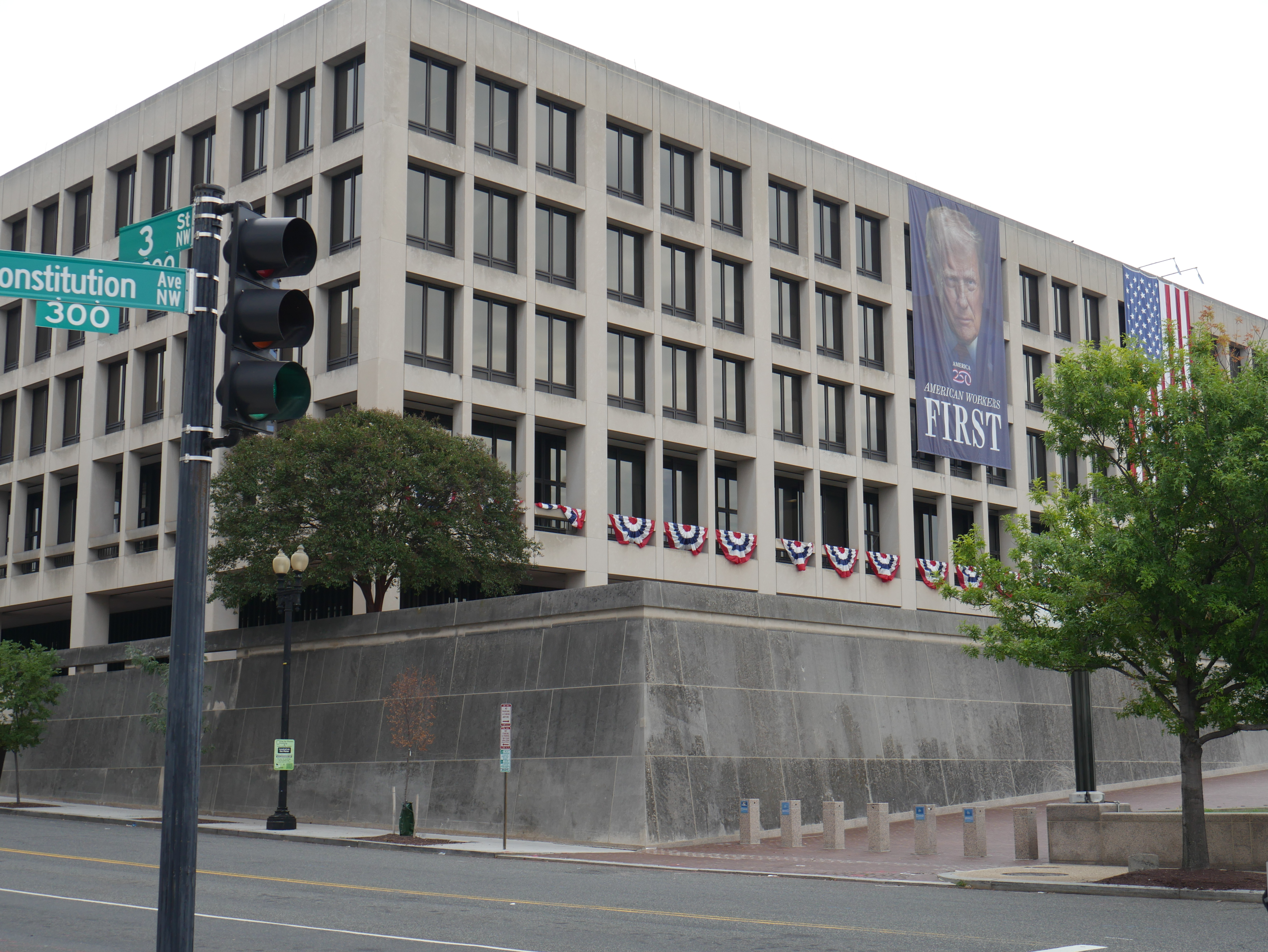
Frances Perkins Building, housing the US Department of Labor, with a Trump poster.

Throughout 2025, large posters with Trump's face were placed on numerous federal buildings, including the Jamie L. Whitten Building and the Frances Perkins Building. Democratic lawmakers likened this to Communist propaganda.

He notably took aim to control the IRS, firing thousands of career staff and installing political allies in their place in an attempt to end its independence, and shared its tax data with ICE to deport migrants that led to several departures at the agency and privacy concerns. Historians described Trump's efforts to politicize the IRS as more brazen than prior actions taken by Franklin D. Roosevelt and Richard Nixon, noting his public announcement of his intention for the IRS to strip Harvard of its tax-exempt status due to his disputes with the university. His efforts bypassed rules established by Congress to prevent presidential meddling at the agency. As a result of Trump's targeting of liberal activists, law firms, and news organizations, some liberal donors slowed their charitable giving to organizations out of fear of investigations and organizations being stripped of their tax-exempt status by the IRS.

==== Compiling data on Americans ====
Trump tasked Palantir Technologies and Elon Musk's Department of Government Efficiency to compile and merge data across federal agencies into a master list containing information on every American. The New York Times estimated such collection would entail roughly 314 areas, including Americans' Social Security numbers, disability status, bank accounts, student debt, medical claims, credit history, alimony paid, charitable contributions, child support, gambling income, IP addresses, educational attainment, marital status, criminal history, voting records, and more. Trump's efforts to gather this data were described as having "elbowed past the objections of career staff, data security protocols, national security experts and legal privacy protections".

The move received criticism from privacy experts and civil society groups, who noted the siloed nature of government data made it hard to hack and leak in a single data breach. It was also criticized for potentially allowing Trump to target and harass his political opponents and grant the president "untold surveillance power". Trump made requests to all 50 states to give his administration access to all personally sensitive data held by them on American citizens, saying it needed the data to verify election integrity, to identify waste and fraud and to keep ineligible immigrants off benefit rolls. Critics described such efforts as an attempt to monitor immigrants and ideological opponents, surveil Americans, and spread false claims of fraud. The moves broke longstanding norms and legal protections. There have been attempts to collect information on users on social media in regards to the NSC 2025 memo and anti ICE protests.

=== Actions against the legal profession ===
In March 2025, Trump said that he would be targeting law firms, a move experts call unprecedented. He first ordered that security clearances be revoked for all of the attorneys at Covington & Burling who are involved in the firm's representation of former special counsel Jack Smith. Smith led federal investigations and prosecutions of Trump in both an election obstruction case and a classified documents case. Trump then signed executive orders 14230 and 14237, each aimed at another firm. The first ordered that the security clearances of all Perkins Coie employees be suspended, and also prohibited the firm from receiving money from federal contractors and barred its attorneys from entering federal buildings. Perkins Coie had represented Hillary Clinton in her 2016 presidential campaign, and in that capacity paid for opposition research that led to the Steele dossier. The second involved similar orders for the firm Paul, Weiss, Rifkind, Wharton & Garrison (known as Paul, Weiss), and for Mark Pomerantz, a previous partner at the firm. Pomerantz had worked with the Manhattan district attorney's office, which subsequently prosecuted Trump for falsifying business records. The firm had done pro bono work in January 6 cases.

Trump subsequently rescinded order 14237 after Paul, Weiss agreed to a set of conditions, such as promising to provide $40 million in free legal services to the administration and end its diversity policies. Within days, Trump issued executive order 14246, this time aimed at Jenner & Block, a firm that employed Andrew Weissmann after he worked on the Mueller special counsel investigation. Two days later, Trump issued another executive order directed at Wilmer Cutler Pickering Hale and Dorr (known as WilmerHale), where Robert Mueller had been a partner; the firm also employed Aaron Zebley and James Quarles, who had worked with the Mueller special counsel investigation. Claire Finkelstein, a law professor at the University of Pennsylvania, said the goal of these executive orders was to "intimidate professionals, to intimidate the legal profession from engaging in professional activities that go against Donald Trump and the current administration."

Perkins Coie filed a lawsuit challenging executive order 14230, and on March 12, Judge Beryl Howell of the US District Court for the District of Columbia issued a temporary restraining order for parts of Trump's executive order. Howell said that the order likely violated several constitutional amendments and "casts a chilling harm of blizzard proportion across the entire legal profession". The Department of Justice attempted to have Howell removed from the case, alleging that she is "insufficiently impartial", but the motion was denied. On March 28, Jenner & Block and WilmerHale also filed suit in the District of Columbia challenging their respective executive orders. The same day, Judge John Bates issued a temporary restraining order for the executive order directed at Jenner & Block, and Judge Richard Leon issued a temporary restraining order for the executive order directed at WilmerHale.

Trump also issued a presidential memorandum, "Preventing Abuses of the Legal System and the Federal Court", targeting lawyers and law firms more generally if they filed "frivolous, unreasonable, and vexatious litigation" against the administration, as judged by the attorney general. The menacing memo, again including revocation of security clearances and preventing any company that uses such a firm from getting federal contracts, has been seen as a threatening escalation and broadening of the president's campaign of retaliation against judges and lawyers who don't share his political views. A variety of people in the legal profession condemned the memorandum as an attempt to intimidate firms so that they wouldn't take on clients who oppose government actions. The Equal Employment Opportunity Commission (EEOC) also contacted 20 law firms, telling them that they were being investigated in relation to their DEI practices.

The series of actions against lawyers and law firms quickly started having the desired effect of making it harder for those who oppose Trump administration actions to find lawyers who would agree to represent them. University of California, Los Angeles (UCLA) Law professor Scott Cummings and a former senior Justice Department official have both called Trump's moves attacking law firms and targeting lawyers "authoritarian". Senior attorney for the American Civil Liberties Union (ACLU) Ben Wizner said Trump's threats are an attempt to "chill and intimidate" lawyers who challenge him. In remarks delivered with the governor of Louisiana, President Trump told reporters that he thinks "The law firms have to behave themselves, and we've proven that."

Within the legal community, there have been varied responses to Trump's attacks on the profession. Law firms that haven't been targeted by Trump have largely been silent in response. A few firms have issued public statements, such as Albert Sellars LLP, whose response was a concise "Fuck that fascist nonsense." The American Bar Association released a statement encouraging everyone in the profession to stand up against Trump's "efforts to undermine the courts and the legal profession", following that with another statement joined by over 50 smaller bar associations across the country. The deans of nearly 80 law schools from across the country also signed a joint letter condemning the administration's actions, stating that "Punishing lawyers for their representation and advocacy violates the First Amendment and undermines the Sixth Amendment." Democratic state attorneys general sent a joint letter as well, condemning Trump's attempts to undermine the rule of law. Rachel Cohen, an associate at Skadden, Arps, Slate, Meagher & Flom (also known as Skadden), organized an open letter, inviting other associates to sign on. The letter, addressed to large law firms, called on them to take a stand, and as of March 27, 2025 over 1500 associates had signed it. Cohen also submitted a conditional resignation letter, calling on Skadden to fight Trump's actions, and they let her go the same day. Skadden later proactively approached the Trump administration before Trump targeted them with an executive order, coming to an agreement with the administration along the same lines as that reached by Paul, Weiss.

=== Pulling security protection and clearances ===
Within 24 hours of being sworn in, Trump revoked the security clearance of his former national security adviser John Bolton as well as the clearances of 50 officials who signed on to a letter about the Hunter Biden laptop controversy, including ex-DNI director James Clapper and ex-CIA directors John Brennan and Leon Panetta. Trump also revoked the security protection for his former secretary of state Mike Pompeo, his aide Brian Hook, and Bolton, who all had faced assassination threats from Iran. The revocation of security protection was described as part of Trump's vow to target those he perceives as adversaries. He also revoked protection for Anthony Fauci who had received several death threats, and said to reporters that he would not feel any responsibility if harm befell the former government officials he revoked security details from.

On January 29, Defense Secretary Pete Hegseth suspended former chair of the Joint Chiefs Mark Milley's security clearance, withdrew the authorization for his security detail, and ordered a review of his actions as Chair of the Joint Chiefs of Staff with a view to demote him in rank. Hours after Trump was inaugurated, the official portrait of General Milley was removed from a Pentagon hallway where the portraits of all former chairmen are displayed.

On August 29, 2025, President Trump announced that effective September 1, Vice President Kamala Harris would no longer receive Secret Service protection, which also had included continual monitoring of intelligence information. She had been Trump’s opponent in the 2024 election. Reportedly, a recent threat assessment had found nothing alarming, and this decision was made several weeks before Harris’ book tour for 107 Days, about her campaign. Former vice-presidents typically receive such protection for 6 months. However, President Joe Biden had signed an executive order extending this for an additional year for Harris.

=== Actions against corporations and business ===
Trump sought a great amount of control over US business, publicly attacked companies and their executives, demanded firings of corporate leaders who criticized or contradicted him, and demanded cuts of profits for the federal government. His administration confirmed that it maintained a loyalty scorecard for 553 American companies based on their "support of present and future administration initiatives".

Trump abandoned traditional Republican orthodoxy about protecting and promoting the free market, and sought greater and direct government control over private business which was widely described by academics, economists, commentators, and former corporate CEOs as an embrace of right-wing socialism, Chinese Communism, or state capitalism. His demand and agreement with NVIDIA and AMD to provide the government with 15% of all overseas chip sales to China were described by critics as a "shakedown" and as potentially illegal and unconstitutional.

In an unprecedented move, the Pentagon became the largest shareholder of MP Materials, bypassing US procurement and contracting laws in the process. As part of an agreement to allow Japan-based Nippon Steel buy US Steel, Trump was granted a personal, not governmental, golden share in US Steel, allowing him to influence board decisions and maintain veto power over certain decisions set to expire at the end of his presidential term, after which the Treasury and Commerce Departments would exercise control under all future presidents. Intel agreed to grant the government a 10% equity stake in its company with no power to influence board decisions "with limited exceptions" in what NBC News described as "the president's latest extraordinary move to exert federal government control over private business".

Writing for Time magazine in 2024, Jeffrey Sonnenfeld described Trump's moves against capitalism from his first term as sharing "more in common with far-left progressive positions than with traditional GOP views, and are often far more progressive than the Biden Administration" and wrote that he expected such attacks to continue into his second term. In February 2026, the New York Times contrasted Trump's economic policies with those of Mitt Romney, the previous Republican presidential nominee before Trump. It described Trump's economic ideology as similar to dirigisme, used in some countries such as France.

=== Actions against the news media and free speech ===
Trump's actions against the news media and those who expressed certain viewpoints were described as negatively impacting free speech. His actions were described as unprecedented in modern American history, and mirroring tactics used by authoritarian leaders. He criticized and fired officials who reported facts, statistics, and analysis that went against his opinions, and ordered them removed or redone to suit his preferences. Scientists expressed fear of expressing viewpoints contrary to administration preferences, and the government undertook widespread online resource removals. His deportations of activists and political dissidents were described as violating their free speech rights.

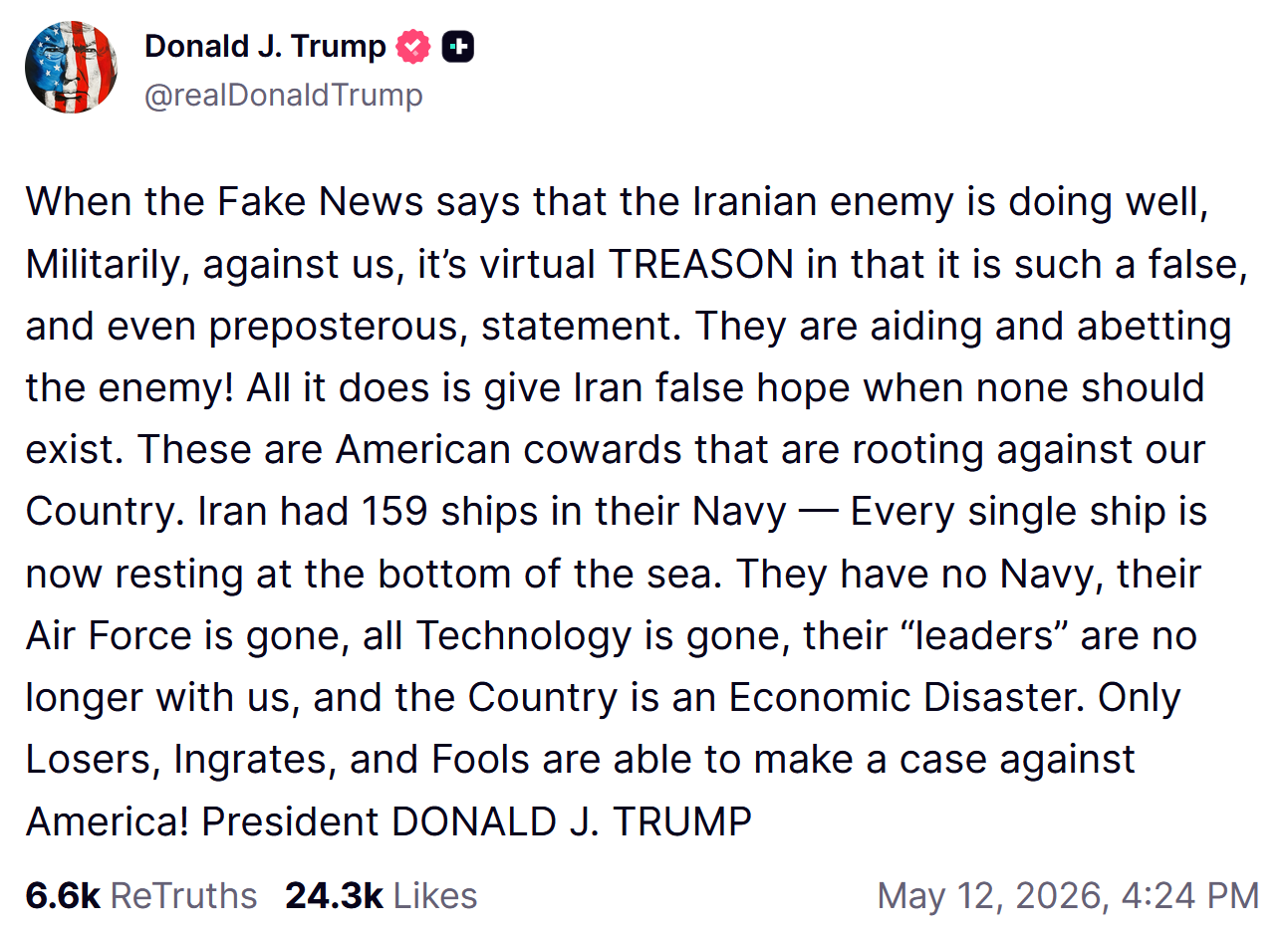
A Truth Social post by Trump on May 12, 2026 accusing the news media of treason for its coverage of the 2026 Iran war.

Trump's actions were described as part of a revenge tour against the news media, which some experts described as a "broad, systematic assault" on free speech. Trump claimed that some news media groups should be "illegal", and frequently assaulted the "fake news" and suggested using law enforcement against them. By 2026, Trump had repeatedly accused media outlets of treason and sedition, and his Department of Justice publicly announced and initiated subpoenas against media companies for critical coverage of the 2026 Iran war. Defense Secretary Pete Hegseth called Democrats and critics of the Iran war as the "biggest adversary" facing the United States. Sitting Federal Communications Commission (FCC) Commissioner Anna M. Gomez called Trump's lawsuit against 60 Minutes' parent company CBS News part of "a campaign to censor and control" and to harass the news media "into covering the news the way they want it to be covered". As a result of Trump's threats, news media executives instructed journalists and their staffs to self-censor and reduce criticism of Trump. The Associated Press described Trump's actions as part of "a systematic pattern by the Republican president to attempt to undermine press freedom in order to shield him from negative coverage".

On July 24, Trump passed an executive order encouraging tech companies to censor their chatbots to prevent "woke AI". This action marked the first time the federal government explicitly attempted to shape the ideological behavior of AI. The order stated that companies selling their AI to the federal government must ensure their programs did not promote "destructive" diversity, equity and inclusion, and "concepts like critical race theory, transgenderism, unconscious bias, intersectionality, and systemic racism". The order drew comparisons by scholars to the Chinese Communist Party's efforts to censor and control AI to reflect the core values of the Communist Party, although they described Trump's efforts as taking a softer and coercive route by instead encouraging self-censorship.

Trump ordered cultural institutions, museums, and the Smithsonian to a comprehensive ideological review of its content. The review resulted in the widespread removal of information by the National Park Service at museums and parks across the country after the agency interpreted the order to include removing any mentions of racism, sexism, slavery, gay rights or persecution of Indigenous people.

In July 2025, Trump sued The Wall Street Journal for publishing a story relating to his past friendship with convicted sex offender Jeffrey Epstein, marking the first time a sitting president sued a media organization for alleged defamation. In September, he also sued The New York Times for defamation. Following comments by Attorney General Pam Bondi that the administration would go after "hate speech" in the aftermath of Charlie Kirk's death, Jonathan Karl of ABC News asked the president for his opinion on comments made by some of his allies who considered hate speech to be free speech. In response, Trump said that his administration would "probably go after people like you, because you treat me so unfairly, it's hate. You have a lot of hate in your heart."

By July 25, 2025, the progressive nonprofit organization Media Matters had cut back on its criticism of Trump and Republicans, and contemplated shutting down entirely, after numerous lawsuits launched against it by the Federal Trade Commission (FTC), Elon Musk, and Republican state attorneys general, strained its cash reserves. The action was described by The New York Times as "offering a glimpse of what might be in store for even well-funded targets of his retribution campaigns". Judge Sparkle L. Sooknanan issued an injunction against the FTC investigation, writing that, "It should alarm all Americans when the government retaliates against individuals or organizations for engaging in constitutionally protected public debate".

In March 2026, a federal judge ruled Executive Order 14290 titled "Ending Taxpayer Subsidization of Biased Media" was unconstitutional. Judge Moss wrote that "It is difficult to conceive of clearer evidence that a government action is targeted at viewpoints that the president does not like and seeks to squelch."

==== FCC investigations ====
On January 22, Trump's FCC chair Brendan Carr revived three investigations into claims of bias from CBS, ABC, and NBC, but not Fox News, and Carr previously promised to punish news broadcasters he saw as unfair to Trump or Republicans in general. On February 12, Carr launched investigations into Comcast, the parent company of NBC News and Universal Studios, over having diversity, equity, and inclusion programs.

On January 29, Carr ordered an investigation into underwriting announcements on NPR and PBS stations, and recommended that Congress stop funding these organizations (which aligns with the section of Project 2025 that Carr had authored). In his first-term budgets, Trump had previously proposed eliminating funding for public broadcasting, art, libraries, and museums. Carr sent a letter to the heads of NPR and PBS with his complaints, but ignored requests for a copy from a Democratic FCC commissioner. On May 1, NPR and PBS were targeted by an executive order instructing the cessation of their funding from the Corporation for Public Broadcasting and the investigation of all other federal funds they received.

Carr revived a 1960's-era policy prohibiting "news distortion" to target media outlets, and his actions were condemned by former Republican and Democratic FCC chairs and independent watchdog groups. Legal experts told Ars Technica that the investigations could be used to "harass licensees and hold up applications related to business deals", and Carr stated that a news distortion complaint against 60 Minutes' Kamala Harris interview would factor into an FCC review of a CBS transfer of TV broadcast station licenses to Skydance. On July 2, CBS agreed to pay Trump's presidential library $16 million to settle the lawsuit while admitting no guilt, which led to allegations of bribing a public official owing to its payment ahead of a merger between Paramount and Skydance Media that required FCC approval. CBS later canceled The Late Show with Stephen Colbert for financial reasons, although its timing ahead of the merger and after recent criticism Colbert made against the settlement payment which Colbert had criticized on the air three days earlier as "a big fat bribe" led to further allegations of political interference and potential bribery. As part of the agreement, CBS agreed to create an Ombudsman to monitor its news channels to root out "bias" at CBS News, and on the same day, Trump also claimed the company had agreed to give it $26 million worth of free airtime.

On September 12, comedian Jimmy Kimmel, on his ABC late-night talk show, blamed Trump for not uniting the country after the assassination of Charlie Kirk and instead attacking Democrats. On the September 15 episode, Kimmel said the "MAGA gang" was "desperately trying to characterize this kid who murdered Charlie Kirk as anything other than one of them" and was trying to "score political points" from the crime rather than sincerely grieving. FCC chief Brendan Carr said Kimmel appeared to "directly mislead the American public" and threatened possible actions against ABC, including the revocation of the broadcast licenses of its owned-and-operated stations. On September 17, Nexstar Media Group announced that they would pre-empt Kimmel on their 32 ABC affiliated stations "for the foreseeable future". Nexstar had been seeking FCC approval for $6.2 billion merger at the time. ABC then announced that it would suspend Jimmy Kimmel Live! indefinitely. Variety described the suspension coming after "several prominent conservatives have called for any critic of [Kirk's] work to be silenced, no matter how nuanced the argument may be". Following the suspension, Trump stated that any network that gave him bad press or allowed a host to criticize him should have their broadcast licenses revoked. The following day, Trump restated that negative coverage of him should be illegal, stating that "When 97 percent of the stories are bad about a person, it's no longer free speech". He later reiterated his message, saying that "They'll take a great story and they'll make it bad. See, I think that's really illegal".

In August 2026, Trump demanded that NBC News reporter Kristen Welker be "reported to the FCC for rebuke or punishment" after she reported on unfavorable polling results about Trump during a TV segment.

==== Restricting media access to the White House ====
Following his reelection, Trump launched lawsuits and created blacklists against certain media outlets, and took over the process run by the White House Correspondents' Association to choose what outlets could gain access to him. He kicked out and prohibited certain outlets from access to events, and allowed right-wing outlets such as Real America's Voice, Blaze Media, and Newsmax into the press pool.

In February 2025, Associated Press journalists were barred from entry to press briefings in the White House after the Trump administration objected to the Associated Press using the name "Gulf of Mexico" instead of "Gulf of America" as chosen by Trump. The Associated Press had recommended both names were to be used, as "Mexico, as well as other countries and international bodies, do not have to recognize the name change", and "the Gulf of Mexico has carried that name for more than 400 years." The Associated Press protested the Trump administration's action as violating the First Amendment to the United States Constitution, while White House press secretary Karoline Leavitt later commented: "If we feel that there are lies being pushed by outlets in this room, we are going to hold those lies accountable", as she described the name of 'Gulf of America' as a "fact". The administration followed up by banning Associated Press journalists indefinitely from the Oval Office and Air Force One, citing the gulf naming issue. Trump said that month that the Associated Press would continue to be banned "until such time as they agree that it's the Gulf of America". Associated Press filed a lawsuit on February 21, in which it states "The press and all people in the United States have the right to choose their own words and not be retaliated against by the government, ... The Constitution does not allow the government to control speech. Allowing such government control and retaliation to stand is a threat to every American's freedom."

On April 8, 2025, federal district judge Trevor McFadden granted the preliminary injunction sought by AP and ruled that the White House must lift the access restrictions they have imposed on the Associated Press while the AP v. Budowich lawsuit moves forward. On April 13, even though a court order was placed, the Trump administration blocked the AP from covering a meeting between Trump and Salvadoran president Nayib Bukele in the Oval Office. On July 21, 2025, Trump banned The Wall Street Journal from access to him after it published a story about Trump's relationship with convicted child sex trafficker Jeffrey Epstein.

=== Actions against higher education ===
Trump's actions targeting higher education were described as part of an intimidation campaign against institutions viewed as hostile to his political views. He targeted higher education by demanding it give federal oversight of curriculum and targeted activists, legal immigrants, tourists, and students with visas who expressed criticism of his policies or engaged in pro-Palestinian advocacy. Trump froze billions of dollars in federal funding for multiple universities in express defiance of existing laws prohibiting such actions without following proper legal processes that did not happen. Emboldened by Columbia University's decision to pay a $221 million fine to the Trump administration to resolve its claims and install an outside monitor to ensure compliance, Trump expanded his university targets to include additional universities.

The deals and demands made by Trump were criticized as coercive, a shakedown, and legalized extortion in what Axios described as pursuit of a "cultural crackdown". In April 2025, the American Association of Colleges and Universities published a statement signed by more than 150 university and college presidents that condemned "unprecedented government overreach and political interference" in education from the Trump administration. Also in April, faculties at several universities in the collegiate Big Ten Conference voted to approve a "mutual-defense compact" against Trump administration actions. Historian of academic freedom in the United States Ellen Schrecker has compared the Trump administration's actions unfavorably to McCarthyism, saying that Trump's actions against universities are more severe and far-reaching than the persecution of communists in academia during the Second Red Scare. On September 3, Judge Allison D. Burroughs found Trump's efforts to freeze billions of dollars of funding for Harvard illegal, writing that the government had infringed upon Harvard's free speech rights and that it was "difficult to conclude anything other than that defendants used antisemitism as a smokescreen for a targeted, ideologically-motivated assault on this country's premier universities".

=== Actions against blue states ===
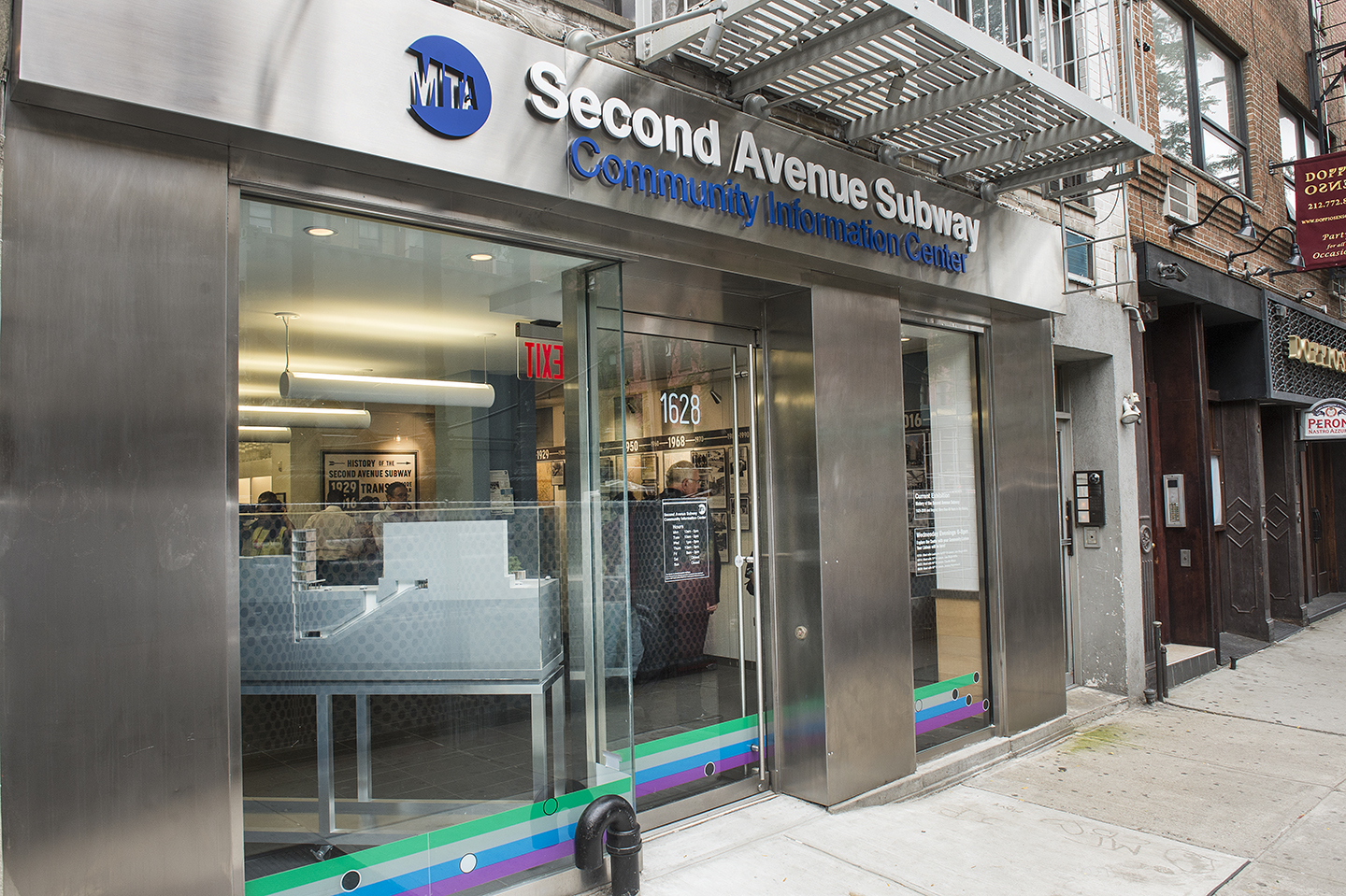
A part of the Second Avenue Subway. A phase of additional construction was planned.

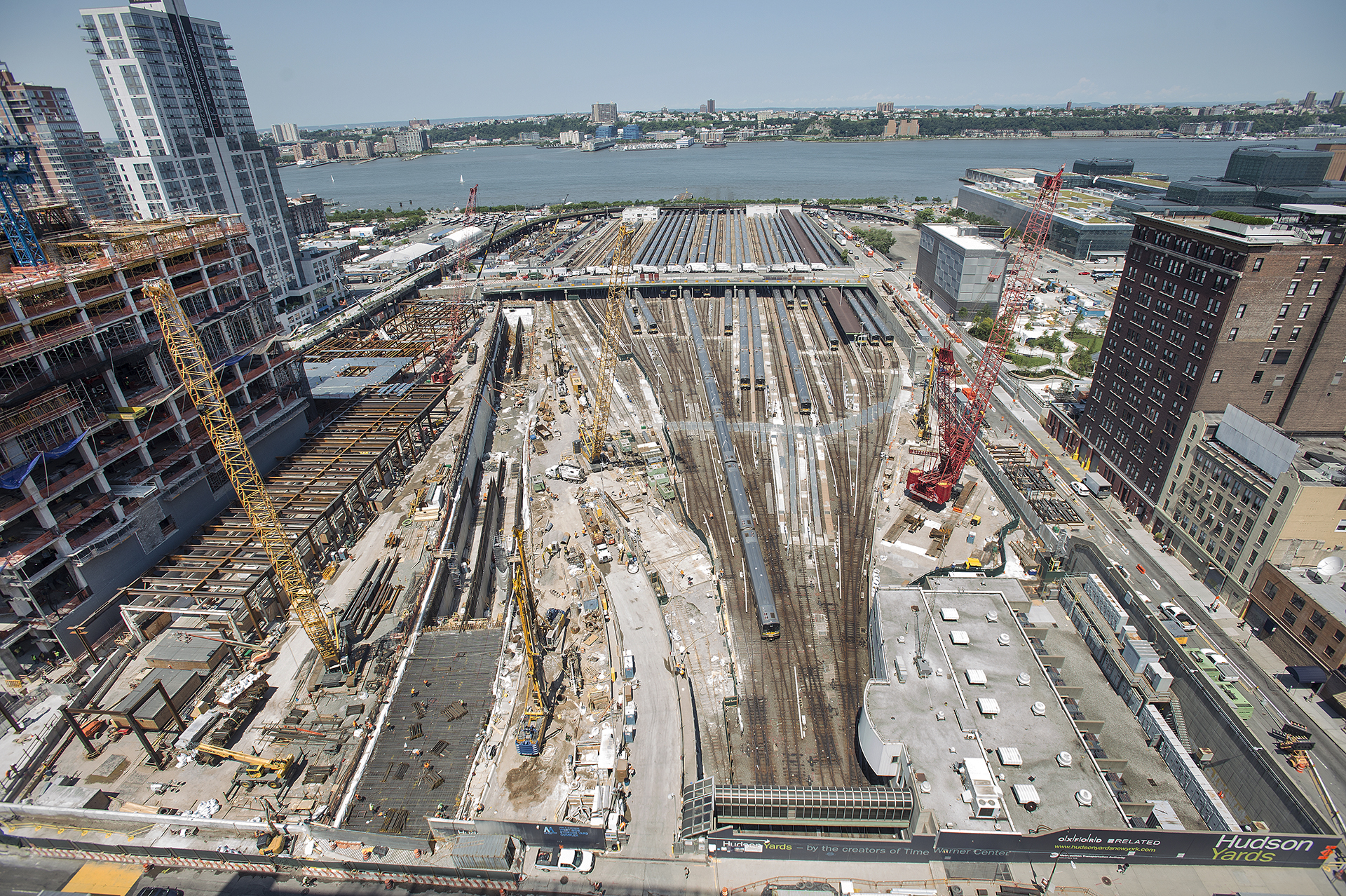
Construction on the Gateway Program (Northeast Corridor)

"arguably the largest infrastructure initiatives in the Western Hemisphere"

Brooke Rollins says "blue states, continue to say no. So as of next week, we have begun and will begin to stop moving federal funds into those states"

Trump has cut funding to blue states. During the 2025 federal government shutdown, the administration halted over $25 billion largely to states that voted for Harris including 18 billion on public transport in New York (the Second Avenue Subway and Hudson Tunnel projects). In January 2026, the administration froze over $10 billion in funding for Child Care and Development Block Grant, Temporary Assistance for Needy Families, and Social Services Block Grant to California, Colorado, Illinois, Minnesota and New York "for fraud concerns".

Responding to a lawsuit about the October 2025 cancellation of $7.5bn in federal grants for clean energy projects, the Department of Energy stipulated that, all but one of the 284 terminated grants were located in a state that voted for Kamala Harris in the 2024 election. The court filing also stipulated that the decision to cancel the grants "was based solely on the political identity of the grant recipient’s state, ie, whether the recipient’s location and/or place of performance was in a Blue State or a non-Blue State."

In August 2026, an email discovered in a lawsuit brought by the State of Colorado revealed that the Trump administration cancelled hundreds of millions of dollars in federal grants to the state in retaliation for imprisoning Tina Peters on election security charges. According to a transcript of the court proceeding disclosing the email, a senior state attorney referred to it as a “smoking gun." Judge R. Brooke Jackson, who oversaw the case, remarked “I’ve never seen anything like it. I’ve never even imagined something like it." And later he added “That’s not the country I think we live in.”

=== Domestic military deployments ===
AI-generated video of Donald Trump flying a jet and dropping fecal matter on protesting crowds posted to Truth Social on the same day as the October 2025 No Kings protests

During his second presidency, Donald Trump ordered deployments of National Guard troops to select U.S. cities in 2025 and certain deployments have continued into 2026. Trump has given multiple explanations for the deployments, saying they are officially part of crackdowns on protests, civil unrest, crime, homelessness, and illegal immigration. The actions targeted Democratic Party-led cities and sparked significant controversy, with critics labeling them as abuses of power and potential violations of laws like the Posse Comitatus Act, which limits military involvement in domestic law enforcement. The moves came amidst broader expansions of the military's domestic use during the second Trump administration, and Trump's prior comments during his presidential campaign to use the military to end civil unrest and protests without consent from state governors and target "the enemy within".

Deployments began in Los Angeles in June 2025 and expanded to Washington, D.C., in August 2025, before presidential authorizations were issued to expand to Memphis, Tennessee, and Portland, Oregon, in September 2025. Federal forces arrived in Memphis in October 2025. Plans were underway for Chicago and potentially other cities like New York, Baltimore, San Francisco, and Oakland, California. In September 2025, Trump told military leaders to view the deployments as "training grounds for our military" and described America as under "invasion" and waging "a war from within". In October 2025, Trump authorized federal troop deployments in Chicago as part of Operation Midway Blitz, a multi-agency surge aimed at "criminal illegal aliens" in Illinois and moved on to New Orleans in December.

On September 2, 2025, a federal judge ruled that the administration had illegally sent troops into Los Angeles in violation of the Posse Comitatus Act, a development described as potentially complicating Trump's threats for further military deployment. Further court cases and appeals questioned the legality of the deployments, with the U.S. Supreme Court rejecting an administration emergency appeal of a lower court ruling blocking the National Guard deployment to Chicago. On December 31, Trump announced that the administration would be ending its efforts to deploy the National Guard to Los Angeles, Portland, and Chicago, while suggesting that future National Guard deployments in those cities were still possible. In January 2026, all troops deployed to Chicago, Portland, and Los Angeles were withdrawn, while the National Guard deployment to the District of Columbia was extended to the end of the year.

In the same month, the Congressional Budget Office estimated that the deployments to Los Angeles, Memphis, Portland, Chicago, and the District of Columbia cost $496 million from June through December 2025, and would cost $93 million per month if all five deployments and the deployment in New Orleans were continued in 2026 (which would amount to $1.1 billion in total if continued for the whole year). A minority staff report issued by the Senate Homeland Security Committee in February 2026 estimated that the deployment to the District of Columbia alone from August 2025 through the end of the month would cost $332 million (or $602 million on an annualized basis), which compared with a $599 million budget for the Metropolitan Police Department for fiscal year 2026. As noted by local elected and law enforcement officials, crime statistics from before the National Guard deployments showed falling violent crime and property crime rates in Portland, Los Angeles, Chicago, Memphis, New Orleans, and the District of Columbia.

== See also ==
- 2025 United States federal government shutdown
- Democratic backsliding in the United States
- Firing of Commissioner of Labor Statistics
- Humphrey's Executor v. United States
- Persecution of transgender people under the second Trump administration
- Republican Party efforts to disrupt voting after the 2024 United States presidential election
  - Election subversion by the second Trump administration
- Schedule F appointment
- Attacks on journalists during the second Trump presidency
- NSPM-7
- ICEBlock
- List of United States presidential vetoes
- Executive Order 14203
