= Afterschool Caucuses =

Caucuses in the United States Congress

The Afterschool Caucuses are bipartisan caucuses in the United States Congress established to build support for afterschool programs and increase resources for afterschool care. Senators Lisa Murkowski (R-AK) and Tina Smith (D-MN) chair the Senate caucus, while Representative Nancy Mace (R-SC) chairs the House caucus.

== History ==
The House and Senate Afterschool Caucuses were founded on March 3, 2005. In addition to the co-chairs, the founding members of Senate and House Afterschool Caucuses were Senators Barbara Boxer (D-CA) and Susan Collins (R-ME) and Representative Dale Kildee (D-MI). Today, these Caucuses serve as a voice on the issue of strengthening and increasing the availability of afterschool programs.

== Purpose ==
The Caucuses were formed in response to the finding that 14.3 million children go home alone after the school day ends, including more than 40,000 kindergartners and almost four million middle school students in grades six to eight. The Caucuses act to promote the availability of afterschool programs, with a special emphasis on the 21st Century Community Learning Center (CCLC) program, for every American school-age child by increasing public awareness of such programs and supporting increased federal resources. In each chamber, the Caucuses have conducted a variety of activities supporting the goal of quality, affordable programs for all children. This has included organizing congressional briefings on specific topics such as the role of the STEM fields in afterschool (science, technology, engineering and mathematics) education; disseminating letters in support of increased resources for afterschool to the President as well as congressional colleagues; sharing new research on effective programs; and organizing press events around the Afterschool Challenge with celebrity supporters.

The Afterschool Caucuses seek to educate the public on the role that afterschool programs play in the lives of families, and promote the expansion of federal, state, and local support in order to make access to these programs a reality for all interested children and families.

== Membership ==
The Afterschool Caucuses are bipartisan. In the 119th Congress, there are 25 members in the House Afterschool Caucus, including 23 Democrats and 2 Republicans, and 21 members in the Senate Afterschool Caucus, including 14 Democrats and 7 Republicans.

=== United States House of Representatives ===
==== Democrats ====
- Terri Sewell (AL-7)
- Doris Matsui (CA-7)
- Zoe Lofgren (CA-18)
- Joe Courtney (CT-2)
- Rosa DeLauro (CT-3)
- John B. Larson (CT-1)
- Kathy Castor (FL-14)
- Debbie Wasserman Schultz (FL-25)
- Jan Schakowsky (IL-9)
- Danny K. Davis (IL-7)
- André Carson (IN-7)
- Richard Neal (MA-1)
- Stephen Lynch (MA-8)
- Jim McGovern (MA-2)
- Chellie Pingree (ME-1)
- Betty McCollum (MN-4)
- Bennie Thompson (MS-2)
- Gregory Meeks (NY-5)
- Al Green (TX-9)
- Lloyd Doggett (TX-37)
- Henry Cuellar (TX-28)
- Rick Larsen (WA-2)
- Adam Smith (WA-9)

==== Republicans ====
- Mike Simpson (ID-2)
- Joe Wilson (SC-2)

=== United States Senate ===
==== Democrats ====
- Chris Coons of Delaware
- Dick Durbin of Illinois
- Angus King of Maine
- Chris Van Hollen of Maryland
- Amy Klobuchar of Minnesota
- Tina Smith of Minnesota (co-chair)
- Jeanne Shaheen of New Hampshire
- Kirsten Gillibrand of New York
- Chuck Schumer of New York
- Sheldon Whitehouse of Rhode Island
- Jack Reed of Rhode Island
- Bernie Sanders of Vermont
- Patty Murray of Washington
- Maria Cantwell of Washington
- Tammy Baldwin of Wisconsin

==== Republicans ====
- Lisa Murkowski of Alaska (co-chair)
- John Boozman of Arkansas
- Jerry Moran of Kansas
- Susan Collins of Maine
- John Thune of South Dakota
- Shelley Moore Capito of West Virginia
