= Jodi Grant =

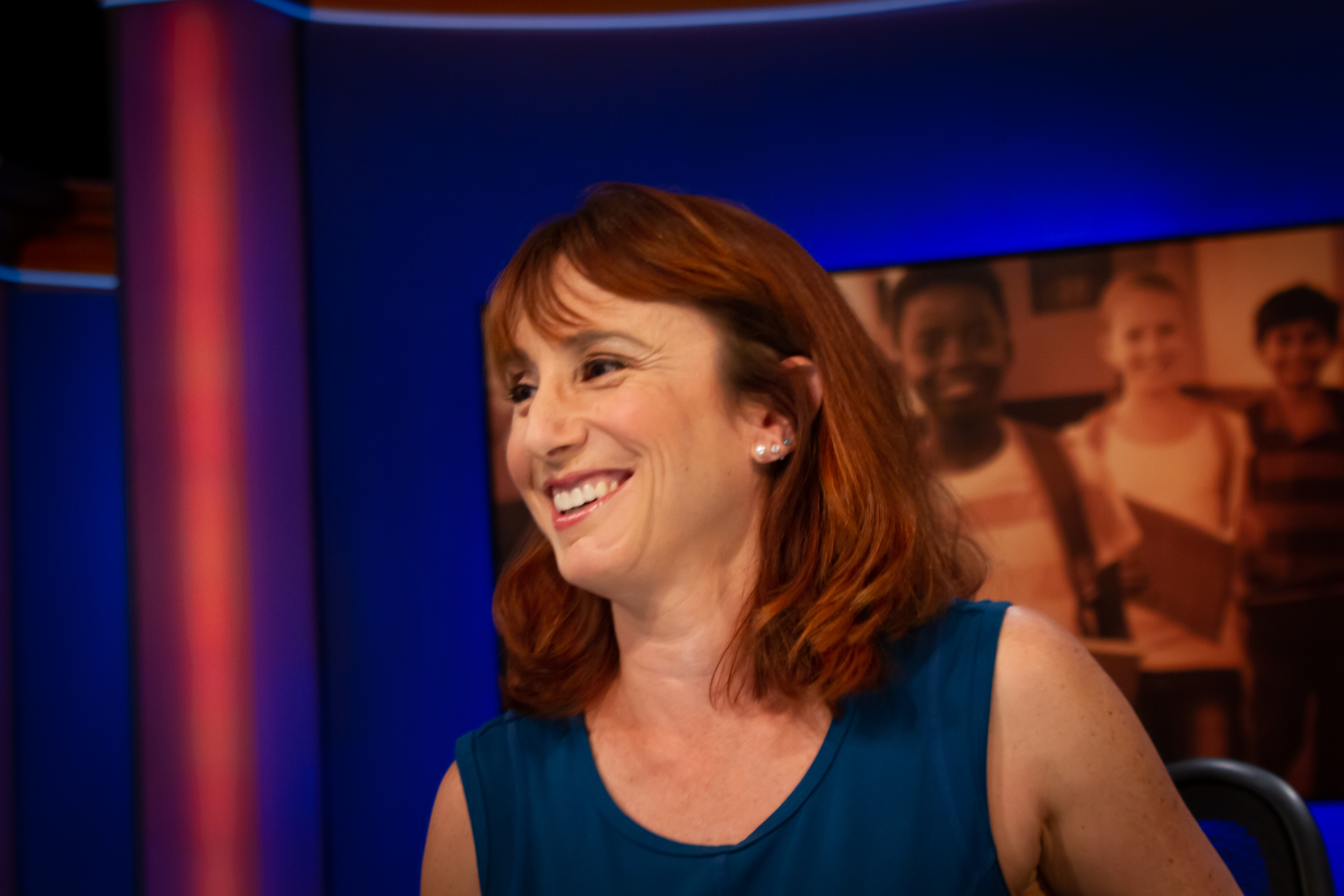
- Born: Jodi Grant; March 1968 (age 58); Flushing, Queens
- Education: Yale University; Harvard Law School
- Occupations: Executive Director, Afterschool Alliance

Jodi Grant (born March 1968) has served as the executive director of the Afterschool Alliance, an American not-for-profit organization, since 2005. Prior to joining the Afterschool Alliance, Grant was the director of Work and Family Programs for the National Partnership for Women & Families. She also worked on Capitol Hill as general counsel to the Senate Budget Committee and as staff director for the Democratic Steering and Coordination Committee. Grant frequently appears in national media, and has been featured on MS NOW, National Public Radio, NewsNation, Good Morning America, PBS NewsHour, the Washington Post, the Wall Street Journal, the Hill, the Atlantic, and The New York Times. She spoke on a panel discussion sponsored by Punchbowl in early 2026. She also appeared in the documentary Screenagers Under the Influence.

== Early life and education ==
Grant was born in Flushing, Queens, New York. She grew up in Oyster Bay, New York, where she attended Oyster Bay High School. She received her B.A. in Sociology with distinction from Yale University in 1990, where she was elected senior class president. In 1993, Grant received her J.D. from Harvard Law School, where she was elected president (first marshall) of the class of 1993. She also served on the editorial board for the Human Rights Journal. Grant, her husband and two children live in Washington, D.C.

== Career ==
Grant worked as the general counsel for the Democratic Senate Budget Committee from 1994 to 1997. As general counsel, she managed budget bills and reconciliation bills on the floor of the United States Senate, coordinated closely with Republican staff of the budget committee to develop and implement legislation, and handling all legal and ethical matters.

From 1997 to 2001, Grant served as the staff director for the Democratic Steering and Coordination Committee, chaired by then-Sen. John Kerry. Her legislative accomplishments include expanded support for the child tax credit, the Children's Health Insurance Program and class size reduction. She also served as liaison to the National Governors' Association, where she worked closely with Republican and Democratic governors.

Following her tenure as a Senate staffer, Grant joined the National Partnership for Women & Families, formerly the Women’s Legal Defense Fund, serving as Director of Work and Family Programs from 2001 to 2005. Grant worked to protect and expand the Family and Medical Leave Act, and was a member of the team that successfully defended the law before the U.S. Supreme Court in Hibbs vs. Nevada Department of Human Resources. Grant also created a national campaign for paid sick days in June 2004, which included a coalition of more than 100 organizations.

Grant serves as executive director of the Afterschool Alliance, where she oversees all aspects of the organization—setting its goals and strategies for policies, including the re-authorization of the Elementary and Secondary Education Act; working with the field to help programs tap into private and federal funding streams; and supervising research to help national, state and local afterschool advocates and providers support, create and expand quality afterschool programs. She began her duties as the executive director of the Afterschool Alliance in 2005 and has since been named one of the 25 most influential people in the afterschool field and published and interviewed extensively as an afterschool expert. Under Grant's leadership, the Afterschool Alliance has played a leading role in the U.S. Department of Education's Engage Every Student Initiative, helping school districts and community organizations leverage funds available for after-school and summer learning programs through the American Rescue Plan Act. The Afterschool Alliance estimates more than $10 billion in American Rescue Plan Act funding was used to support after-school and summer learning programs. The organization has also helped cultivate high-profile champions for after-school programs including Usher, Arnold Schwarzenegger, former U.S. Secretary of Education Richard Riley.
