= Afterschool Alliance =

U.S. nonprofit organization

- Established: 2000
- Type: Education
- Location: Washington, D.C.
- Executive Director: Jodi Grant
- Website: www.afterschoolalliance.org

The Afterschool Alliance is a nonpartisan, nonprofit organization in the United States whose mission is "to ensure that all children have access to affordable, quality afterschool programs." It uses communications and advocacy strategies to increase public and private investments in afterschool programs. The Alliance serves as both a central resource center for afterschool programs, as well as a public advocate. The Afterschool Alliance has more than 25,000 afterschool program partners and its publications reach more than 65,000 interested individuals every month.

== History ==
The Afterschool Alliance was established in 2000 by the Charles Stewart Mott Foundation, the United States Department of Education, JCPenney, the Open Society Institute/The After-School Corporation, the Entertainment Industry Foundation and the Creative Artists Agency Foundation.

The Afterschool Alliance grew from public awareness efforts undertaken by the Mott Foundation through a public-private partnership with the U.S. Department of Education to expand afterschool programs through the 21st Century Community Learning Centers initiative. The federal government provided grants to local communities for afterschool programs, while the Mott Foundation funded training, evaluation and public awareness activities. The Foundation and the Department's efforts caught the attention of several outside entities with a shared interest in achieving afterschool for all. These groups came together in September 1999 to create the Afterschool Alliance, which was formally incorporated as a nonprofit in 2000.

Today, the Alliance works with a broad range of organizations and supporters, including policymakers and policymaker associations, advocacy groups, afterschool coalitions and providers at every level, business and philanthropic leaders, technical assistance organizations and leaders representing a variety of interests, each with a stake in afterschool.

== Programs ==
=== Afterschool for All Challenge ===
The Afterschool for All Challenge is a conference held in Washington, D.C., for youth, staff, and other individuals involved in afterschool programs. The event brings together hundreds of afterschool supporters (staff, parents, youth, agency and community leaders) for networking, training, meetings with Congressional offices and a special recognition of state and Congressional afterschool leaders. Previous Congressional Champions honored at the event have included: Representatives Nita Lowey (D-NY), Patrick Kennedy (D-RI), Phil Hare (D-IL) and Bobby Scott (D-VA), and Senators Barbara Boxer (D-CA), Dick Durbin (D-IL), Thad Cochran (R-MS), Christopher Dodd (D-CT), John Ensign (R-NV), Johnny Isakson (R-GA), Ben Nelson (D-NE), Jack Reed (D-RI) and Arlen Specter (D-PA). In 2009, U.S. Secretary of Education Arne Duncan spoke about the role of community organizations and afterschool in supporting students. Maggie Daley, Chair of After School Matters, was honored for her efforts to provide quality afterschool opportunities for older youth, and Members of Congress and state leaders from California, Georgia, Illinois, Kentucky, Maryland, Michigan, New York and Ohio were recognized.

=== Lights On Afterschool ===
Lights On Afterschool is a nationwide rally to draw attention to the importance of afterschool programs and to highlight their importance to children, families and communities. Each year, more than one million people attend over 7,500 events. Lights On Afterschool is covered in every major media market in the country and in thousands of news clips. Lights On Afterschool events give student participants in afterschool programs a chance to show off the skills that they have learned in their respective programs and to demonstrate the need for further support of such programming.

In 2001, Arnold Schwarzenegger became Honorary Chair of the event. The Empire State Building in New York City regularly features yellow lights on the evening of Lights on Afterschool in honor of the cause. In 2008, Afterschool Alliance replaced its former Lights on Afterschool incandescent lightbulb symbol with a CFL (compact fluorescent lamp) to support energy efficiency.

=== Afterschool for All ===
Afterschool for All is a national petition in support of afterschool programs stating that all children and youth should have access to quality, affordable afterschool programs. Roughly 19,000 individuals and organizations have signed on. Among the partners are governors, mayors and law enforcement leaders, and others who support the cause of afterschool programs. These partners include the YMCA of the USA, the NAACP, the National Council of La Raza, the National PTA, the National League of Cities, AARP, 100 Women in Hedge Funds, Time Warner, IBM, the NBA, NFL, MLB, NHL and the US Conference of Mayors.

=== Afterschool Ambassadors ===
Afterschool Ambassadors are trained to act as spokespeople on the issue of afterschool programming. Participants in the program learn about communications and advocacy in order to act as liaisons to their respective communities. The Ambassadors also receive media training. Afterschool Ambassadors share their experiences and their education and serve as local representatives of the issue of afterschool.

== Legislation ==
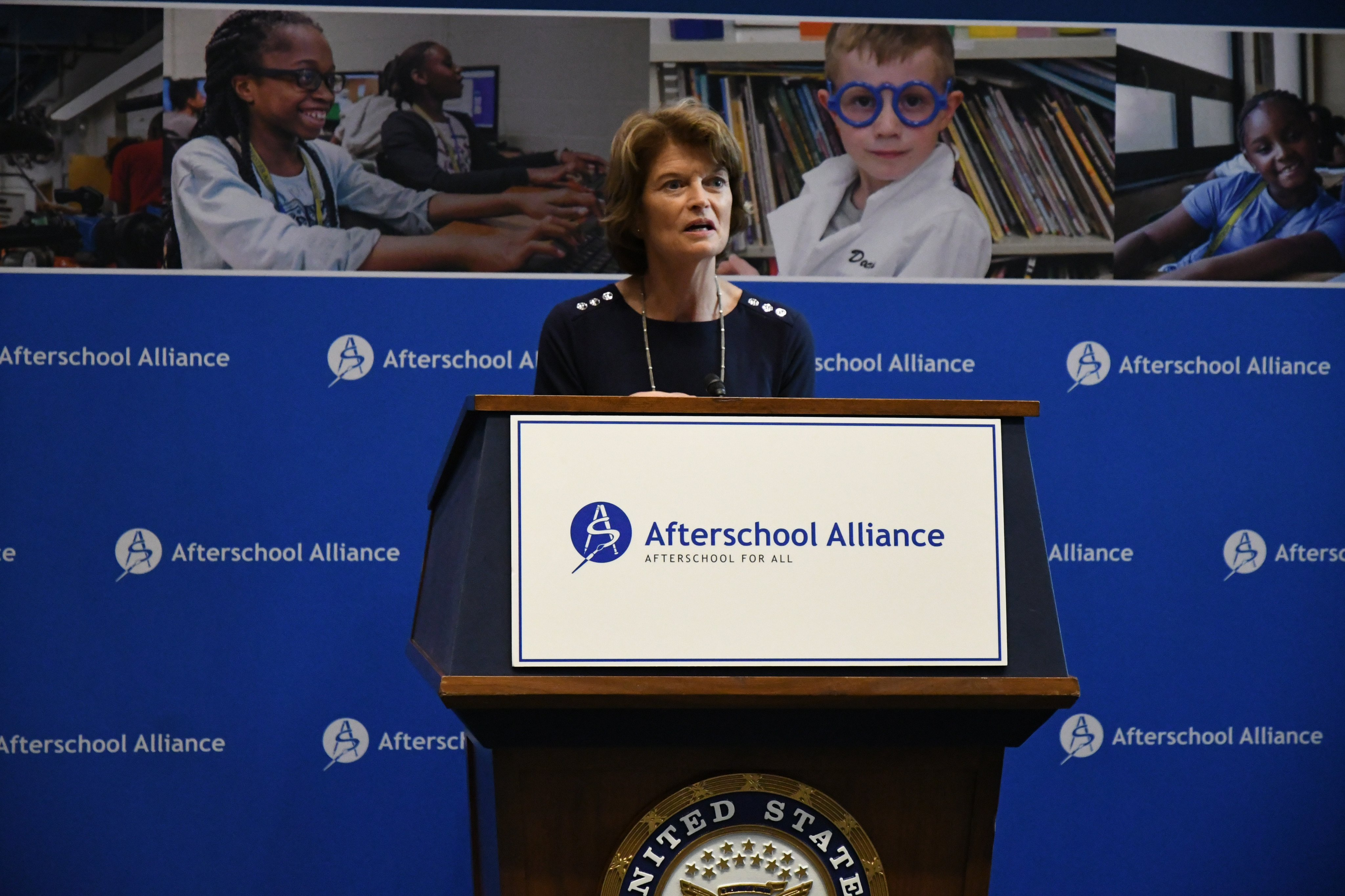
Senator Lisa Murkowski speaking at the Afterschool Alliance in 2019

On February 24, 2014, Representatives Dan Kildee (D-MI) and Rosa DeLauro (D-CT) introduced the Afterschool for America's Children Act in the United States House of Representatives. The legislation would reauthorize and strengthen the 21st Century Community Learning Centers (21st CCLC) initiative—the nation’s chief federal funding stream for afterschool programs—by supporting innovative advances taking root in before-school, afterschool and summer learning programs. The bill was companion legislation to S. 326 introduced previously in the United States Senate. More than 110 national, state and local organizations signed a letter in support of the legislation, including: Afterschool Alliance, After-School All-Stars, SHAPE America – Society of Health and Physical Educators (formally AAHPERD), American Camp Association, American Heart Association, Camp Fire, National Association of Elementary School Principals, National Education Association, National Alliance for Partnerships in Equity, National Farm to School Network, National Science Teachers Association, Save the Children, and the United States Soccer Foundation. Kildee reintroduced the legislation in the 114th Congress on February 24, 2015.

The Afterschool Alliance also spoke out in favor of the Child Care and Development Block Grant Act of 2013 (S. 1086; 113th Congress). The bill would reauthorize the Child Care and Development Block Grant Act of 1990 to provide block grants to the states to help low-income parents find child care for their children. In addition to reauthorizing the program, it amends the law to require background checks on grant recipients and annual inspections. The Afterschool Alliance supported the bill, saying "it is important to emphasize the value of quality school-age child care to achieve positive outcomes for children, including improved academic performance, work habits and study skills.
