= Child Care and Development Block Grant Act of 2013 =

Child Care and Development Block Grant Act of 2014
- Long title: To reauthorize and improve the Child Care and Development Block Grant Act of 1990, and for other purposes.
- Announced in: the 113th United States Congress
- Sponsored by: Sen. Barbara A. Mikulski (D, MD)
- Number of co-sponsors: 3

Codification
- Acts affected: Child Care and Development Block Grant Act of 1990, Individuals with Disabilities Education Act, Social Security Act, Head Start Act, Elementary and Secondary Education Act of 1965, and others.
- U.S.C. sections affected: 20 U.S.C. § 1431 et seq., 20 U.S.C. § 1401, 20 U.S.C. § 1419, 42 U.S.C. § 601 et seq., 42 U.S.C. § 16901 et seq., and others.
- Agencies affected: Federal Bureau of Investigation, Department of Health and Human Services

Legislative history
- Introduced in the Senate as S. 1086 by Sen. Barbara A. Mikulski (D, MD) on June 3, 2013; Committee consideration by United States Senate Committee on Health, Education, Labor, and Pensions; Passed the Senate on March 13, 2014 (Recorded Vote 77: 96-2)

The Child Care and Development Block Grant Act of 2013 (S. 1086) is a bill that would reauthorize the Child Care and Development Block Grant Act of 1990 to provide block grants to the states to help low-income parents find child care for their children. In addition to reauthorizing the program, it also makes amendments to the law to try to improve it. Some of those improvements include required background checks on grant recipients and annual inspections.

The bill was introduced into the United States Senate during the 113th United States Congress.

== Background ==
The Child Care and Development Block Grant is the main federal program to help families pay for child care. States use the block grants they receive from the federal government to subsidize child care, mostly through voucher programs.

== Provisions of the bill ==
This summary is based largely on the summary provided by the Congressional Research Service, a public domain source.

The Child Care and Development Block Grant Act of 2013 would reauthorize the Child Care and Development Block Grant Act of 1990 through FY2019.

The bill would revise the Act to allow a joint interagency office, designated by the governor, to serve as the lead agency for a state desiring to receive a community services programs child care and development block grant.

The bill would increase from two to three years the period that must be covered by a state child care and development plan.

The bill would revise and expands plan requirements to include, among others, compliance with state and local health and safety requirements, compliance with child abuse reporting requirements, protection for working parents, and coordination with other programs. Prescribes early learning and developmental guidelines.

The bill would authorize a state to use funds to establish or support a system of local or regional child care resource and referral organizations.

The bill would require a state receiving funds under such Act to carry out at least two of specified activities affecting the quality of child care.

The bill would require states receiving grant funds under such Act to carry out criminal background checks for child care staff members of child care providers.

The bill would make ineligible for employment by a licensed, regulated, or registered child care provider any individual who: (1) refuses to consent to a criminal background check, (2) knowingly makes a materially false statement in connection with such a background check, (3) is registered or is required to be registered on a state sex offender registry or the National Sex Offender Registry, or (4) has been convicted of one or more specified felonies.

The bill would direct the Secretary of Health and Human Services (HHS) to operate a national toll-free hotline and website.

The bill would define "child with a disability" as one under age 13 who is eligible for early intervention services under the Individuals with Disabilities Education Act.

== Congressional Budget Office report ==
This summary is based largely on the summary provided by the Congressional Budget Office, as ordered reported by the Senate Committee on Health, Education, Labor, and Pensions on September 18, 2013. This is a public domain source.

S. 1086 would amend and reauthorize through fiscal year 2020 the Child Care and Development Block Grant Act of 1990. Specifically, it would authorize the appropriation of such sums as may be necessary to carry out the purposes of that program and add additional requirements to the program. The Child Care and Development Block Grant (CCDBG) program was initially authorized through 2002 and has been authorized in annual appropriation acts since then. It is currently authorized through 2014 by the Consolidated Appropriations Act, 2014 (Pub. L. 113–76 (text) (PDF)).

== Procedural history ==
The Child Care and Development Block Grant Act of 2013 was introduced into the United States Senate on June 3, 2013 by Sen. Barbara A. Mikulski (D, MD). It was referred to the United States Senate Committee on Health, Education, Labor, and Pensions. The committee reported the bill on February 25, 2014 with an amendment in the nature of a substitute alongside Senate Report 113-138. On March 13, 2014, the Senate voted in Recorded Vote 77 to pass the bill 96-2.

== Debate and discussion ==
Senator Mikulski, who introduced the bill, argued that "this bill ensures that all children get the care they need and deserve."

Only one Senator, Mike Lee (R-UT), did not vote for the bill.

Child Care Aware of America supported the bill, saying that it is "time to strengthen minimum protections for children," which they believed the reauthorization and amendments would do. The organization supported having background checks on workers, requiring training basic CPR and health training, and holding unannounced inspections. Afterschool Alliance also supported the bill, saying "it is important to emphasize the value of quality school-age child care to achieve positive outcomes for children, including improved academic performance, work habits and study skills.

On September 12, 2014, House and Senate leaders reached a bipartisan agreement to reauthorize the Child Care and Development Block Grant Act. Negotiated by Representatives John Kline (R-MN), George Miller (D-CA), Todd Rokita (R-IN), and David Loebsack (D-IA), and Senators Tom Harkin (D-IA), Lamar Alexander (R-TN), Barbara Mikulski (D-MD), and Richard Burr (R-NC), the agreement will enhance transparency, strengthen health and safety protections, and improve the quality of care.

The House passed the amended version of the bill on September 15, 2014.

== See also ==
- List of bills in the 113th United States Congress
- Child care and development block grant
