= 21st Century Community Learning Centers =

United States federal after-school initiative

The 21st Century Community Learning Centers (21st CCLC) initiative is the only federal funding source dedicated exclusively to afterschool programs. The No Child Left Behind Act (NCLB) reauthorized 21st CCLC in 2002, transferring the administration of the grants from the U.S. Department of Education to the state education agencies. Each state receives funds based on its share of Title I funding for low-income students. Funds are also allotted to outlying areas and the Bureau of Indian Affairs.The No Child Left Behind Act narrowed the focus of 21st CCLC from a community learning center model, where all members of the community benefited from access to school resources such as teachers, computer labs, gymnasiums and classrooms, to an afterschool program model that provides services only to students attending high-poverty, low-performing schools. The services they provide include Academic enrichment activities that can help students meet state and local achievement standards. They also provide additional services designed to reinforce and complement the regular academic program, such as: drug and violence prevention programs, counseling programs, art, music, and recreation programs, technology education programs, and character education programs. Programs also may provide literacy and related educational development services to the families of children who are served in the program.

== Mission and goals ==
The mission of 21st Century Community Learning Centers is to promote student achievement and prepare students to compete on a global scale. Specifically, the program targets high-poverty and low-performing schools that may need extra support. The program has three main goals:

1. To help students achieve standards in core academic subjects, such as reading and math

2. To offer enrichment programs that supplement regular academic programs

3. To provide educational services for the families of participating students

The following sections explain more about how 21st Century achieves these goals.

== History ==
After school programs were developed in the early 1900s. As neighborhoods became more dangerous and more mothers entered the workforce, parents searched for safe places for their children to go after school. Schools responded to these changes by creating programs in which students could stay after school to receive help with their homework or to participate in other activities. In 1994, The U.S. Congress created 21st Century Community Learning Centers through the Elementary and Secondary Education Act. Originally, all community members were welcome to use these centers, not just students. In other words, any member of the community could go to participating schools and take 21st Century classes after the regular school hours. The original bill (Text H.R.6. - 103rd Congress) states the following:

"21st Century Community Learning Centers enable the entire community to develop an education strategy that addresses the educational needs of all members of local communities."

Congress distributed the first grants for community learning centers in 1998. Originally, grants lasted three years. Most centers held only academic programs, although a few held recreational programs as well. The early budget was about $40 million.

In 2001, The U.S. Congress expanded the 21st Century program through the No Child Left Behind Act. Through NCLB, Congress increased the funding for the 21st Century program from $40 million to $1 billion.

With NCLB, Congress also changed how 21st Century grants were distributed. Rather than give money directly to schools, the program began distributing funds to states. The amount of money allocated to each state is now based on the percentage of schools within a state that qualify as Title I schools (schools where at least 40 percent of the students are from families living below the poverty line). The states then determine how the funds are distributed to schools.

== Organizational structure ==
The 21st Century program is implemented at many different levels. Implementation begins at the federal level. It then moves down to the state level, and it is finally distributed on the front lines at the local level to eligible entities.

=== Federal structure ===
The Elementary and Secondary Education Act (ESEA) describes the purposes and procedures of the 21st Century program. State and local levels of government also function within the boundaries and procedures provided by the ESEA. The U.S. Congress gives all of the money allocated to the 21st Century program to the U.S. Department of Education (USDE).

The USDE distributes the appropriated money to a state only when two requirements have been met: (1) the state applies for the grant money, and (2) the USDE finds that the state will use the money in accordance with ESEA requirements. Qualifying states are allocated an amount of money determined by the ESEA.

=== State structure ===
Once the states receive money from the USDE, they distribute the money to eligible local entities that meet the requirements. These entities could be any local organization that meets the ESEA eligibility requirements, including school districts. States distribute money to entities in three- to five-year grants. This is done after (1) an entity has applied for a grant, (2) the state finds that the entity is eligible to receive a grant, and (3) the state finds that the entity will use the money in accordance with ESEA standards.

=== Criteria ===
The ESEA requires applicants to meet two major criteria: (1) entities must use the money only on services prescribed by the ESEA, and (2) these entities must periodically evaluate the progress of the grant-funded programs. Also, all entities should use the results of the evaluations to improve their programs, and they must make the results publicly available.anyone who makes the deans list at 21 can have his picture taken with the dean and will be presented with an award for excellence featured on college television.

=== Local structure ===
Entities that receive these grants are estimated to serve a total of 1.7 million students across the country each year. Furthermore, these programs likely serve hundreds of thousands of adults.

Grant-receiving organizations may also be supported by non-governmental organizations. For example, some communities may collaborate with organizations such as Girl Scouts of the USA, Boy Scouts of America, Gear Up, Teens Act, and ESOL Adult Program.

== Budget ==
On average, Congress appropriated about $1.9 billion annually to the program between 2002 and 2007. Since 2007, Congress has determined yearly how much money will be appropriated to the program. However, the congressional record does not explain how Congress determines the amount appropriated each year.

Congressional records indicate that in 2015 Congress will appropriate $3.5 billion in grants to local education agencies. However, this number includes all programs that provide grants to local educational agencies, not just 21st Century.

This money will be distributed to qualifying states that apply and then on to eligible local entities.

== See also ==
- Afterschool Alliance
