= Social Services Block Grant =

Social Services Block Grant (SSBG) funds are to enable each state in the United States to furnish social services best suited to meet the needs of the individuals residing within the state. Such services may be, but are not limited to: daycare for children or adults, protective services for children or adults, special services to persons with disabilities, adoption, case management, health-related services, transportation, foster care for children or adults, substance abuse, housing, home-delivered meals, independent/transitional living, employment services or any other social services found necessary by the state for its population. Services funded by the SSBG as far as practicable under the conditions of that state are directed at one or more of five goals: achieving or maintaining economic self-support to prevent, reduce or eliminate dependency; achieving or maintaining self-sufficiency, including reduction or prevention of dependency; preventing or remedying neglect, abuse or exploitation of children and adults unable to protect their own interest, or preserving, rehabilitating or reuniting families; preventing or reducing inappropriate institutional care by providing for community-based care, home-based care or other forms of less intensive care; and/or securing referral or admission for institutional care when other forms of care are not appropriate or providing services to individuals in institutions. SSBG are administered by the Administration for Children and Families (ACF), a division of the United States Department of Health and Human Services (HHS).

== Target population ==
Under Title XX, each eligible jurisdiction determines the services that will be provided and the individuals that will be eligible to receive services. Federal block grant funds may be used to provide services directed toward one of the following five goals specified in the law: (1) To prevent, reduce, or eliminate dependency; (2) to achieve or maintain self-sufficiency; (3) to prevent neglect, abuse, or exploitation of children and adults; (4) to prevent or reduce inappropriate institutional care; and (5) to secure admission or referral for institutional care when other forms of care are not appropriate.

== Eligible applicants ==
Funds are allocated to the 50 states, the District of Columbia, the Commonwealth of Puerto Rico, and the Territories of Guam, American Samoa, the Virgin Islands, and the Northern Mariana Islands.

In January 2026, the Department of Health and Human Services released a memo notifying all 50 states that the Child Care and Development Block Grant would no longer be sent until they independently satisfy their new, non-Congressionally approved requirements.. Although the Trump administration has stated publicly and confirmed to multiple news agencies, North Carolina has confirmed they have not received any official information from the administration. These funding changes also coincided with the reported cancellation of funding to the Temporary Assistance for Needy Families and the SSBG to the specific states of California, Colorado, Illinois, Minnesota, and New York with similar reasoning.
