= Temporary Assistance for Needy Families =

U.S. federal aid program

Program overview
- Formed: 1997; 29 years ago
- Preceding Program: Aid to Families with Dependent Children
- Jurisdiction: Federal government of the United States
- Annual budget: $16.5 billion (FY 2021)
- Parent department: Administration for Children and Families
- Website: www.acf.hhs.gov/programs/ofa/programs/tanf

Temporary Assistance for Needy Families (TANF /tænɪf/) is a federal assistance program of the United States. It began on July 1, 1997, and succeeded the Aid to Families with Dependent Children (AFDC) program, providing cash assistance to indigent American families through the Administration for Children and Families, a division of the United States Department of Health and Human Services. TANF is often regarded as just "welfare", but some argue this is a misnomer. Unlike AFDC, which provided a guaranteed cash benefit to eligible families, TANF is a block grant to states that creates no federal entitlement to welfare and is used by states to provide non-welfare services, including educational services, to employed people.

The TANF program, emphasizing the welfare-to-work principle, is a grant given to each state to run its own welfare program and designed to be temporary in nature and has several limits and requirements. The TANF grant has a five-year lifetime limit and requires that all recipients of welfare aid must find work within three years of receiving aid, including single parents who are required to work at least 30 hours per week (35 for two-parent families). Failure to comply with work requirements could result in loss of benefits. TANF funds may be used for the following reasons: to provide assistance to needy families so that children can be cared for at home; to end the dependence of needy parents on government benefits by promoting job preparation, work and marriage; to prevent and reduce the incidence of out-of-wedlock pregnancies; and to encourage the formation and maintenance of two-parent families.

== Background ==
Prior to TANF, Aid to Families with Dependent Children was a major federal assistance program that was coming under heavy criticism. Some argued that such programs were ineffective, promoted dependency on the government, and encouraged behaviors detrimental to escaping from poverty. Some people also argued that TANF is detrimental to its recipients because using these programs have a stigma attached to them, which makes the people that use them less likely to participate politically to defend this program, and thus the programs have been subsequently weakened. Beginning with President Ronald Reagan's administration and continuing through the first few years of the Clinton administration, growing dissatisfaction with AFDC, particularly the rise in welfare caseloads, led an increasing number of states to seek waivers from AFDC rules to allow states to more stringently enforce work requirements for welfare recipients. The 27 percent increase in caseloads between 1990 and 1994 accelerated the push by states to implement more radical welfare reform.

States that were granted waivers from AFDC program rules to run mandatory welfare-to-work programs were also required to rigorously evaluate the success of their programs. As a result, many types of mandatory welfare-to-work programs were evaluated in the early 1990s. While reviews of such programs found that almost all programs led to significant increases in employment and reductions in welfare rolls, there was little evidence that income among former welfare recipients had increased. In effect, increases in earnings from jobs were offset by losses in public income, leading many to conclude that these programs had no anti-poverty effects. However, the findings that welfare-to-work programs did have some effect in reducing dependence on government increased support among policymakers for moving welfare recipients into employment.

While members of the Democratic and Republican parties agreed on the importance of transitioning families from government assistance to jobs, they disagreed on how to accomplish this goal. Democratic congresspersons thought that welfare reform should expand opportunities for welfare mothers to receive training and work experience that would help them raise their families' living standards by working more and at higher wages. Republicans emphasized work requirements and time limits, paying little attention to whether or not families' incomes increased. More specifically, Republicans wanted to impose a five-year lifetime limit on welfare benefits and provide block grants for states to fund programs for poor families. Republicans argued that welfare to work reform would be beneficial by creating role models out of mothers, promoting maternal self-esteem and sense of control, and introducing productive daily routines into family life. Furthermore, they argued that reforms would eliminate welfare dependence by sending a powerful message to teens and young women to postpone childbearing. Democratic congresspersons responded that the reform sought by Republicans would overwhelm severely stressed parents, deepen the poverty of many families, and force young children into unsafe and unstimulating child care situations. In addition, they asserted that welfare reform would reduce parents' ability to monitor the behaviors of their children, leading to problems in child and adolescent functioning.

In 1992, as a presidential candidate, Bill Clinton pledged to "end welfare as we know it" by requiring families receiving welfare to work after three years. As president, Clinton was attracted to welfare expert and Harvard University Professor David Ellwood's proposal on welfare reform and thus Clinton eventually appointed Ellwood to co-chair his welfare task force. Ellwood supported converting welfare into a transitional system. He advocated providing assistance to families for a limited time, after which recipients would be required to earn wages from a regular job or a work opportunity program. Low wages would be supplemented by expanded tax credits, access to subsidized childcare and health insurance, and guaranteed child support.

In 1994, Clinton introduced a welfare reform proposal that would provide job training coupled with time limits and subsidized jobs for those having difficulty finding work, but it was defeated. Later that year, when Republicans attained a Congressional majority in November 1994, the focus shifted toward the Republican proposal to end entitlements to assistance, repeal AFDC and instead provide states with blocks grants. The debates in Congress about welfare reform centered around five themes:

- Reforming Welfare to Promote Work and Time Limits: The welfare reform discussions were dominated by the perception that the then-existing cash assistance program, AFDC, did not do enough to encourage and require employment, and instead incentivized non-work. Supporters of welfare reform also argued that AFDC fostered divorce and out-of-wedlock birth, and created a culture of dependency on government assistance. Both President Clinton and Congressional Republicans emphasized the need to transform the cash assistance system into a work-focused, time-limited program.
- Reducing Projected Spending: Republicans argued that projected federal spending for low-income families was too high and needed to be reduced to lower overall federal spending.

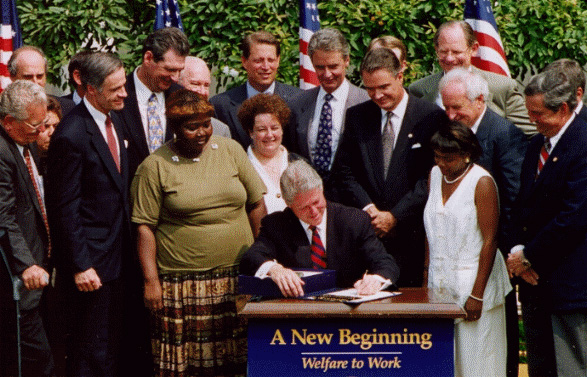
President Bill Clinton signing welfare reform legislation

- Promoting Parental Responsibility: There was broad agreement among politicians that both parents should support their children. For custodial parents, this meant an emphasis on work and cooperation with child support enforcement. For non-custodial parents, it meant a set of initiatives to strengthen the effectiveness of the child support enforcement.
- Addressing Out-of-Wedlock Birth: Republicans argued that out of wedlock birth was presenting an increasingly serious social problem and that the federal government should work to reduce out-of-wedlock births.
- Promoting Devolution: A common theme in the debates was that the federal government had failed and that states were more successful in providing for the needy, and thus reform needed to provide more power and authority to states to shape such policy.

Clinton twice vetoed the welfare reform bill put forward by House Speaker Newt Gingrich and Senate Majority Leader Bob Dole. Then just before the Democratic Convention he signed a third version after the Senate voted 74–24 and the House voted 256–170 in favor of welfare reform legislation, formally known as the Personal Responsibility and Work Opportunity Reconciliation Act of 1996 (PRWORA). Clinton signed the bill into law on August 22, 1996. PRWORA replaced AFDC with TANF and dramatically changed the way the federal government and states determine eligibility and provide aid for needy families.

Before 1997, the federal government designed the overall program requirements and guidelines, while states administered the program and determined eligibility for benefits. Since 1997, states have been given block grants and both design and administer their own programs. Access to welfare and amount of assistance varied quite a bit by state and locality under AFDC, both because of the differences in state standards of need and considerable subjectivity in caseworker evaluation of qualifying "suitable homes". However, welfare recipients under TANF are actually in completely different programs depending on their state of residence, with different social services available to them and different requirements for maintaining aid.

== Funding and eligibility ==
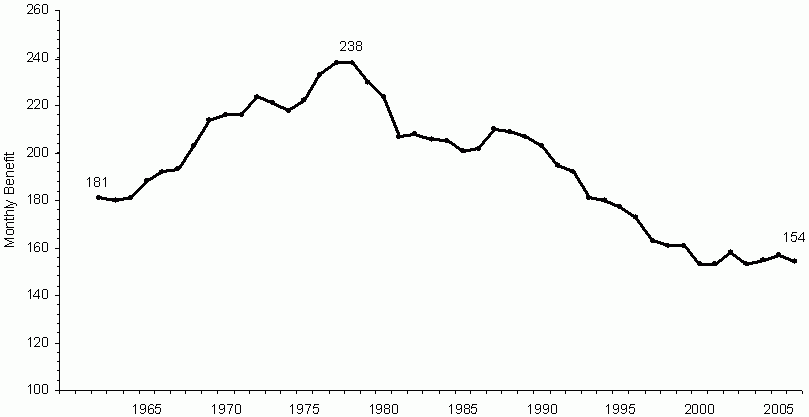
Evolution of monthly AFDC and TANF benefits in the US (in 2006 dollars)

PRWORA replaced AFDC with TANF and ended entitlement to cash assistance for low-income families, meaning that some families may be denied aid even if they are eligible. Under TANF, states have broad discretion to determine who is eligible for benefits and services. In general, states must use funds to serve families with children, with the only exceptions related to efforts to reduce non-marital childbearing and promote marriage. States cannot use TANF funds to assist most legal immigrants until they have been in the country for at least five years. TANF sets forth the following work requirements in order to qualify for benefits:

1. Recipients (with few exceptions) must work as soon as they are job ready or no later than three years after coming on assistance.
2. Single parents are required to participate in work activities for at least 30 hours per week. Two-parent families must participate in work activities 35 hours a week.
3. Failure to participate in work requirements can result in a reduction or termination of benefits to the family.
4. States, in fiscal year 2004, have to ensure that 50 percent of all families and 90 percent of two-parent families are participating in work activities. If a state meets these goals without restricting eligibility, it can receive a caseload reduction credit. This credit reduces the minimum participation rates the state must achieve to continue receiving federal funding.

While states are given more flexibility in the design and implementation of public assistance, they must do so within various provisions of the law:

1. Provide assistance to needy families so that children may be cared for in their own homes or in the homes of relatives;
2. end the dependence of needy parents on government benefits by promoting job preparation, work, and marriage;
3. prevent and reduce the incidence of out-of-wedlock pregnancies and establish annual numerical goals for preventing and reducing the incidence of these pregnancies;
4. and encourage the formation and maintenance of two-parent families.

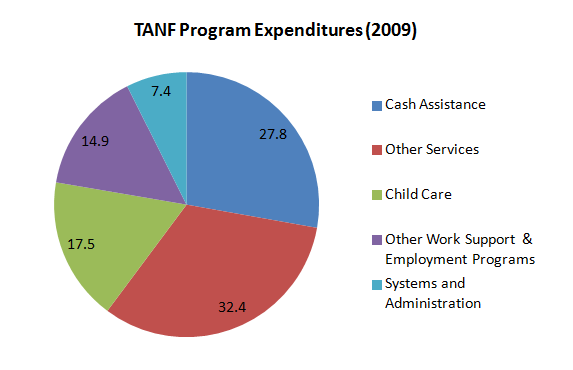
TANF program spending

Since these four goals are deeply general, "states can use TANF funds much more broadly than the core welfare reform areas of providing a safety net and connecting families to work; some states use a substantial share of funding for these other services and program".

Funding for TANF underwent several changes from its predecessor, AFDC. Under AFDC, states provided cash assistance to families with children, and the federal government paid half or more of all program costs. Federal spending was provided to states on an open-ended basis, meaning that funding was tied to the number of caseloads. Federal law mandated that states provide some level of cash assistance to eligible poor families but states had broad discretion in setting the benefit levels. Under TANF, states qualify for block grants. The funding for these block grants have been fixed since fiscal year 2002 and the amount each state receives is based on the level of federal contributions to the state for the AFDC program in 1994, with no adjustments for inflation, size of caseload, or other factors. This has led to a great disparity in the grant size per child living in poverty among the states, ranging from a low of $318 per child in poverty in Texas to a high of $3,220 per child in poverty in Vermont, with the median per child grant size being $1,064 in Wyoming. The states are required to maintain their spending for welfare programs at 80 percent of their 1994 spending levels, with a reduction to 75 percent if states meet other work-participation requirements. States have greater flexibility in deciding how they spend funds as long as they meet the provisions of TANF described above.

Currently, states spend only slightly more than one-quarter of their combined federal TANF funds and the state funds they must spend to meet TANF's "maintenance of effort" (MOE) requirement on basic assistance to meet the essential needs of families with children, and just another quarter on child care for low-income families and on activities to connect TANF families to work. They spend the rest of the funding on other types of services, including programs not aimed at improving employment opportunities for poor families. TANF does not require states to report on whom they serve with the federal or state funds they shift from cash assistance to other uses.

In July 2012, the Department of Health and Human Services released a memo notifying states that they are able to apply for a waiver for the work requirements of the TANF program. Republicans claimed the waiver would allow states to provide assistance without having to enforce the work component of the program. The administration has stipulated that any waivers that weaken the work requirement will be rejected. The DHHS granted the waivers after several Governors requested more state control. The DHHS agreed to the waivers on the stipulation that they continue to meet all Federal requirements. States were given the right to submit their own plans and reporting methods only if they continued to meet Federal requirements and if the state programs proved to be more effective.

In January 2026, the Department of Health and Human Services released a memo notifying all 50 states that the Child Care and Development Block Grant would no longer be sent until they independently satisfy their new, non-Congressionally approved requirements. Although the Trump administration has stated publicly and confirmed to multiple news agencies, North Carolina has confirmed they have not received any official information from the administration. These funding changes also coincided with the reported cancellation of funding to the TANF and the Social Services Block Grant to the specific states of California, Colorado, Illinois, Minnesota, and New York with similar reasoning.

== Impact ==
=== Case load ===
Between 1996 and 2000, the number of welfare recipients plunged by 6.5 million, or 53% nationally. The number of caseloads was lower in 2000 than at any time since 1969, and the percentages of persons receiving public assistance income (less than 3%) was the lowest on record. Since the implementation of TANF occurred during a period of strong economic growth, there are questions about how much of the decline in caseloads is attributable to TANF program requirements. First, the number of caseloads began declining after 1994, the year with the highest number of caseloads, well before the enactment of TANF, suggesting that TANF was not solely responsible for the caseload decline. Research suggests that both changes in welfare policy and economic growth played a substantial role in this decline, and that no larger than one-third of the decline in caseloads is attributable to TANF.

=== Work, earnings, and poverty ===
One of the major goals of TANF was to increase work among welfare recipients. During the post-welfare reform period, employment did increase among single mothers. Single mothers with children showed little changes in their labor force participation rates throughout the 1980s and into the mid-1990s, but between 1994 and 1999, their labor force participation rose by 10%. Among welfare recipients, the percentage that reported earnings from employment increased from 6.7% in 1990 to 28.1% by 1999. While employment of TANF recipients increased in the early years of reform, it declined in the later period after reform, particularly after 2000. From 2000 to 2005, employment among TANF recipients declined by 6.5%. Among welfare leavers, it was estimated that close to two-thirds worked at a future point in time About 20 percent of welfare leavers are not working, without a spouse, and without any public assistance. Those who left welfare because of sanctions (time limits or failure to meet program requirements) fared comparably worse than those who left welfare voluntarily. Sanctioned welfare recipients have employment rates that are, on average, 20 percent below those who left for reasons other than sanctions.

While the participation of many low-income single parents in the labor market has increased, their earnings and wages remained low, and their employment was concentrated in low-wage occupations and industries: 78 percent of employed low-income single parents were concentrated in four typically low-wage occupations: service; administrative support and clerical; operators, fabricators, and laborers; and sales and related jobs. While the average income among TANF recipients increased over the early years of reform, it has become stagnant in the later period; for welfare leavers, their average income remained steady or declined in the later years. Studies that compared household income (includes welfare benefits) before and after leaving welfare find that between one-third and one-half of welfare leavers had decreased income after leaving welfare.

During the 1990s, poverty among single-mother and their families declined rapidly from 35.4% in 1992 to 24.7% in 2000, a new historic low. However, due to the fact that low-income mothers who left welfare are likely to be concentrated in low-wage occupations, the decline in public assistance caseloads has not translated easily into reduction in poverty. The number of poor female-headed families with children dropped from 3.8 million to 3.1 million between 1994 and 1999, a 22% decline compared to a 48% decline in caseloads. As a result, the share of working poor in the U.S. population rose, as some women left public assistance for employment but remained poor. Most studies have found that poverty is quite high among welfare leavers. Depending on the source of the data, estimates of poverty among leavers vary from about 48% to 74%.

TANF requirements have led to massive drops in the number of people receiving cash benefits since 1996, but there has been little change in the national poverty rate during this time. The table below shows these figures along with the annual unemployment rate.

The Center for Budget and Policy Priorities (CBPP) suggest that deep poverty, or those living under half the poverty line, increased following the implementation of work requirements in several pilot programs in the 1990s. The same report highlighted that in the same period of time, short-term employment increased while emphasizing that three quarters of those who worked in the final year of the program would have been employed with or without work requirements. In the first decade of TANFs existence, the programs effect on income varied by group with a 18 percent decrease in real wages for the bottom tenth of income earners who were also single mothers. Income for single mothers in the top 90 percent of income earners saw a varied increases throughout the same decade. The value of benefits from that same decade have declined substantially when compared to the initial decade of TANF's existence. For a family of three in 2020, the maximum benefit you can receive in 18 states are below 20 percent of poverty line. The CFBB argue the reduction in benefits combined with work requirements has dramatically reduced to the number of TANF recipients highlighting that 23 out of 100 families with children in poverty have access to TANF benefits, down from 68 in 1996.

Average monthly TANF recipients, percent of U.S. families in poverty and unemployment rate
Year	Average monthly TANF recipients	Poverty rate (%)	Annual unemployment rate (%)
1996	12,320,970 (see note)	11.0	5.4
1997	10,375,993	10.3	4.9
1998	8,347,136	10.0	4.5
1999	6,824,347	9.3	4.2
2000	5,778,034	8.7	4.0
2001	5,359,180	9.2	4.7
2002	5,069,010	9.6	5.8
2003	4,928,878	10.0	6.0
2004	4,748,115	10.2	5.5
2005	4,471,393	9.9	5.1
2006	4,166,659	9.8	4.6
2007	3,895,407	9.8	4.5
2008	3,795,007	10.3	5.4
2009	4,154,366	11.1	8.1
2010	4,375,022	11.7	8.6

Note: 1996 was the last year for the AFDC program, and is shown for comparison. All figures are for calendar years. The poverty rate for families differs from the official poverty rate.

=== Marriage and fertility ===
A major impetus for welfare reform was concern about increases in out-of-wedlock births and declining marriage rates, especially among low-income women. The major goals of the 1996 legislation included reducing out-of-wedlock births and increasing rates and stability of marriages.

Studies have produced only modest or inconsistent evidence that marital and cohabitation decisions are influenced by welfare program policies. Schoeni and Blank (2003) found that pre-1996 welfare waivers were associated with modest increases in probabilities of marriage. However, a similar analysis of post-TANF effect revealed less consistent results. Nationally, only 0.4% of closed cases gave marriage as the reason for leaving welfare. Using data on marriage and divorces from 1989 to 2000 to examine the role of welfare reform on marriage and divorce, Bitler (2004) found that both state waivers and TANF program requirements were associated with reductions in transitions into marriage and reductions from marriage to divorce. In other words, individuals who were not married were more likely to stay unmarried, and those who were married were more likely to stay married. Her explanation behind this, which is consistent with other studies, is that after reform single women were required to work more, increasing their income and reducing their incentive to give up independence for marriage, whereas for married women, post-reform there was potentially a significant increase in the number of hours they would have to work when single, discouraging divorce.

In addition to marriage and divorce, welfare reform was also concerned about unwed childbearing. Specific provisions in TANF were aimed at reducing unwed childbearing. For example, TANF provided cash bonuses to states with the largest reductions in unwed childbearing that are not accompanied by more abortions. States were also required to eliminate cash benefits to unwed teens under age 18 who did not reside with their parents. TANF allowed states to impose family caps on the receipt of additional cash benefits from unwed childbearing. Between 1994 and 1999, unwed childbearing among teenagers declined 20 percent among 15-to-17-year-olds and 10 percent among 18- and 19-year-olds. In a comprehensive cross-state comparison, Horvath-Rose & Peters (2002) studied nonmarital birth ratios with and without family cap waivers over the 1986–1996 period, and they found that family caps reduced nonmarital ratios. Any fears that family caps would lead to more abortions was allayed by declining numbers and rates of abortion during this period.

=== Child well-being ===
Proponents of welfare reform argued that encouraging maternal employment will enhance children's cognitive and emotional development. A working mother, proponents assert, provides a positive role model for her children. Opponents, on the other hand, argued that requiring women to work at low pay puts additional stress on mothers, reduces the quality time spent with children, and diverts income to work-related expenses such as transportation and childcare. Evidence is mixed on the impact of TANF on child welfare. Duncan & Chase-Lansdale (2001) found that the impact of welfare reform varied by age of the children, with generally positive effects on school achievement among elementary school-age children and negative effects on adolescents, especially with regards to risky or problematic behaviors. Another study found large and significant effects of welfare reform on educational achievement and aspirations, and on social behavior (i.e. teacher assessment of compliance and self-control, competence and sensitivity). The positive effects were largely due to the quality of childcare arrangement and afterschool programs that accompanied the move from welfare to work for these recipients. Yet another study found that substitution from maternal care to other informal care had caused a significant drop in performance of young children. In a program with less generous benefits, Kalili et al. (2002) found that maternal work (measured in months and hours per week) had little overall effect on children's antisocial behavior, anxious/depressed behavior or positive behavior. They find no evidence that children were harmed by such transitions; if anything, their mothers report that their children are better behaved and have better mental health.

Synthesizing findings from an extensive selection of publications, Golden (2005) reached the conclusion that children's outcomes were largely unchanged when examining children's developmental risk, including health status, behavior or emotional problems, suspensions from school, and lack of participation in extracurricular activities. She argues that contrary to the fears of many, welfare reform and an increase in parental work did not seem to have reduced children's well-being overall. More abused and neglected children had not entered the child welfare system. However, at the same time, improvement in parental earnings and reductions in child poverty had not consistently improved outcomes for children.

=== Maternal well-being ===
While the material and economic well-being of welfare mothers after the enactment of TANF has been the subject of countless studies, their mental and physical well-being has received little attention. Research on the latter has found that welfare recipients face mental and physical problems at rates that are higher than the general population. Such problems which include depression, anxiety disorder, post-traumatic stress disorder, and domestic violence mean that welfare recipients face many more barriers to employment and are more at risk of welfare sanctions due to noncompliance with work requirements and other TANF regulations Research on the health status of welfare leavers have indicated positive results. Findings from the Women's Employment Study, a longitudinal survey of welfare recipients in Michigan, indicated that women on welfare but not working are more likely to have mental health and other problems than are former welfare recipients now working. Similarly, interviews with now employed welfare recipients find that partly as a result of their increased material resources from working, the women felt that work has led to higher self-esteem, new opportunities to expand their social support networks, and increased feelings of self-efficacy. Furthermore, they became less socially isolated and potentially less prone to depression. At the same time, however, many women were experiencing stress and exhaustion from trying to balance work and family responsibilities.

=== Paternal well-being ===
For single fathers within the program, there is a small percentage increase of employment in comparison to single mothers, but there is a significant increase of increased wages throughout their time in the program. As of June 2020, the number of one-parent families participating in TANF is 432,644.

== Reauthorization ==
Enacted in July 1997, TANF was set for reauthorization in Congress in 2002. However, Congress was unable to reach an agreement for the next several years, and as a result, several extensions were granted to continue funding the program. TANF was finally reauthorized under the Deficit Reduction ACT (DRA) of 2005. DRA included several changes to the original TANF program. It raised work participation rates, increased the share of welfare recipients subject to work requirements, limited the activities that could be counted as work, prescribed hours that could be spent doing certain work activities, and required states to verify activities for each adult beneficiary.

In February 2009, as part of the American Recovery and Reinvestment Act of 2009 (ARRA), Congress created a new TANF Emergency Fund (TANF EF), funded at $5 billion and available to states, territories, and tribes for federal fiscal years 2009 and 2010. The original TANF law provided for a Contingency Fund (CF) funded at $2 billion which allows states meeting economic triggers to draw additional funds based upon high levels of state MOE spending. This fund was expected to (and did) run out in FY 2010. The TANF Emergency Fund provided states 80 percent of the funding for spending increases in three categories of TANF-related expenditures in FYs 2009 or 2010 over FYs 2007 or 2008. The three categories of expenditures that could be claimed were basic assistance, non-recurrent short-term benefits, and subsidized employment. The third category listed, subsidized employment, made national headlines as states created nearly 250,000 adult and youth jobs through the funding. The program, however, expired on September 30, 2010, on schedule with states drawing down the entire $5 billion allocated by ARRA.

TANF was scheduled for reauthorization again in 2010. However, Congress did not work on legislation to reauthorize the program and instead they extended the TANF block grant through September 30, 2011, as part of the Claims Resolution Act. During this period Congress once again did not reauthorize the program but passed a three-month extension through December 31, 2011.

== Exiting the TANF program ==
When transitioning out of the TANF program, individuals find themselves in one of three situations that constitute the reasons for exiting:

1. Work related TANF exit, in which individuals no longer qualify for TANF assistance due to acquired employment.
2. Non- work TANF related exit in which the recipient no longer qualifies for assistance due to reaching the maximum time allowed to be enrolled in the assistance program. Once their time limit has been reached, individuals are removed from receiving assistance.
3. Continued TANF receipt in which employed recipients earning a wage that does not help cover expenses continue receiving assistance.

It has been observed that certain situations of TANF exit are more prominent depending on the geographic area which recipients live in. Focusing the comparison between metropolitan (urban) areas and non-metropolitan (rural) areas, the number of recipients experiencing non work TANF related exit is highest among rural areas (rural areas in the South experience the highest cases of this type of exiting the program).

Information asymmetry or lack of knowledge among recipients on the various TANF work incentive programs is a contributor to recipients experiencing non work related TANF exits. Not being aware of the offered programs impacts their use and creates misconceptions that influence the responsiveness of those who qualify for such programs, resulting in longer time periods requiring TANF services. Recipients who exit TANF due to work are also affected by information asymmetry due to lack of awareness on the "transitional support" programs available to facilitate their transitioning into the work field. Programs such as childcare, Supplemental Nutrition Assistance Program (SNAP), and Medicaid are meant increase work incentive but many TANF recipients transitioning into work do not know they are eligible. It has been shown that TANF-exiting working women who use and maintain the transitional incentive services described above are less likely to return to receiving assistance and are more likely to experience long-term employment.

== Criticism ==
Peter Edelman, an assistant secretary in the Department of Health and Human Services, resigned from the Clinton administration in protest of Clinton signing the Personal Responsibility and Work Opportunity Act, which he called, "The worst thing Bill Clinton has done." According to Edelman, the 1996 welfare reform law destroyed the safety net. It increased poverty, lowered income for single mothers, put people from welfare into homeless shelters, and left states free to eliminate welfare entirely. It moved mothers and children from welfare to work, but many of them are not making enough to survive. Many of them were pushed off welfare rolls because they did not show up for an appointment, when they had no transportation to get to the appointment, or were not informed about the appointment, said Edelman.

Critics later said that TANF was successful during the Clinton administration when the economy was booming, but failed to support the poor when jobs were no longer available during the downturn, particularly the 2008 financial crisis, and particularly after the lifetime limits imposed by TANF may have been reached by many recipients.
