= Child Care and Development Block Grant =

The Child Care and Development Block Grant (CCDBG), also called the Child Care and Development Fund, is the primary source of United States federal funding for child care subsidies for low-income working families and funds to improve child care quality.

Some states also provide child care assistance through Temporary Assistance for Needy Families (TANF) funds. States design their own child care assistance programs within minimal federal guidelines.

Child care assistance helps families succeed financially. When families receive child care assistance they are more likely to be employed and to have higher earnings. Approximately 1.8 million children receive CCDBG-funded child care in an average month. Yet, only one in seven eligible children receives child care assistance.

== History ==
Funding was first authorized under the CCDBG Act of 1990 within the Omnibus Budget Reconciliation Act of 1981, which was enacted under the Omnibus Budget Reconciliation Act of 1990.

Since CCDBG’s inception, much has been learned about the role of early learning and development on the success of a child, and CCDBG has become an important tool not just for helping families work, but also for helping them ensure their children get a strong start in life. When CCDBG won bipartisan reauthorization in 2014, the act explicitly named child development as one of its objectives. It mandated a certain percentage of the funds be used to increase quality in subsidized child care, established new health and safety standards, earmarked funds specifically for infants and toddlers, and required states provide families with information about providers’ licensing, histories, and inspections.

Even as political polarization has increased, CCDBG has retained wide bipartisan support. In 2018, Republican President Donald Trump and majorities in both parties approved a historic increase of $2.37 billion for CCDBG.

During the COVID-19 pandemic, Republicans and Democrats both prioritized child care as a crucial component for getting essential workers into the workplace, fueling workforce expansion, and simultaneously supporting the safety and development of children. All of the major relief packages passed by Congress contained significant infusions into CCDBG. In 2021, Joe Biden passed The American Rescue Plan, with no votes from Republicans in Congress. The ARPA included $15 billion for the Child Care and Development Block Grant.

In January 2026, the Department of Health and Human Services released a memo notifying all 50 states that the CCDBG would no longer be sent until they independently satisfy their new, non-Congressionally approved requirements.. Although the Trump administration has stated publicly and confirmed to multiple news agencies, North Carolina has confirmed they have not received any official information from the administration. These funding changes also coincided with the reported cancellation of funding to the Temporary Assistance for Needy Families and the Social Services Block Grant to the specific states of California, Colorado, Illinois, Minnesota, and New York with similar reasoning.

== See also ==
- Administration for Children and Families
- Child Care and Development Block Grant Act of 2013 (S. 1086; 113th Congress)
