= Right Side Broadcasting Network =

American conservative news media company

- Type: Media
- Founded: July 2015; 11 years ago
- Founder: Joe Seales
- Headquarters: Auburn, Alabama, United States
- Website: www.rsbnetwork.com

Right Side Broadcasting Network (RSBN, also known as Right Side Broadcasting), is an American right-wing conservative media company founded by Joe Seales in 2015. RSBN is best known for its live stream coverage of Donald Trump's rallies, town halls, and public events on the platform's YouTube and Rumble channels. As of 2026, RSBN's channel on YouTube has over two million subscribers, receiving hundreds of millions of total views.

== History ==
In July 2015, Joe Seales began live streaming rallies for candidate Donald Trump during the 2016 presidential election. After his videos began to accumulate over a million views, Seales tapped into the demand for unedited Trump footage. Thus, Seales created Right Side Broadcasting to "show the full context" of Trump's speeches. Since RSBN began gaining in popularity the company has accumulated hundreds of millions of views on its YouTube channel.

=== 2016–2019 coverage ===
During the summer of 2016, the company started several shows with Wayne Dupree and pastor Mark Burns. During the third presidential debate in 2016, Trump live streamed RSBN's coverage of the debates on his Facebook page. In October 2016, the company received $40,000 (~$52,516 in 2025) in donations.

On October 24, in collaboration with the RSBN, Trump launched a nightly newscast on his Facebook page. Several commentators wondered whether the company may collaborate with Trump to form "Trump TV". Seales, in response, told Business Insider that the speculation was "unfounded." Trump told WLW that he was not interested in setting up the company after the election.

According to Seales, Trump "watched the network a lot" on his private jet during his 2016 presidential campaign and that Trump appreciated the company for showing his crowds. Seales has also stated that he was in regular communication with Dan Scavino, then Trump's director of social media.

In 2016, RSBN was the official live streaming platform for the Trump campaign's Facebook page, where their footage reached almost 300 million views. Their YouTube channel grossed almost 120 million views.

On December 7, 2016, Right Side Broadcasting Network was given access to the White House Press Room during Trump's presidency. After Trump's press conference on January 11, 2017, Drudge Report featured the network's feed on their front page.

On January 19, 2017, the network live-streamed the DeploraBall.

In August 2017, RSBN parted ways with far-right political commentator Nick Fuentes, whose show America First had previously aired on their network. The split was announced shortly after Fuentes announced that he had attended the Unite the Right rally in Charlottesville, Virginia.

=== 2020 presidential election coverage ===
Right Side Broadcasting Network continued covering all of the campaign rallies for President Trump from the beginning of 2020. The first 2020 campaign rally took place in Toledo, Ohio, on January 9, 2020. RSBN covered campaign rallies for Trump until he took a hiatus from campaigning due to the COVID-19 pandemic. RSBN began covering campaign rallies once more after Trump began campaigning again with his June 2020 rally in Tulsa, Oklahoma. RSBN also covered Trump's speech and fireworks celebration at Mount Rushmore on July 3, 2020.

Over the span of the 2020 presidential election, RSBN's coverage of Trump's campaign rallies received over 127 million views on YouTube.

== See also ==
- Social media in the 2016 United States presidential election
