= 2020 Donald Trump rally in Tulsa =

Presidential campaign event in Oklahoma

Donald Trump's Tulsa rally
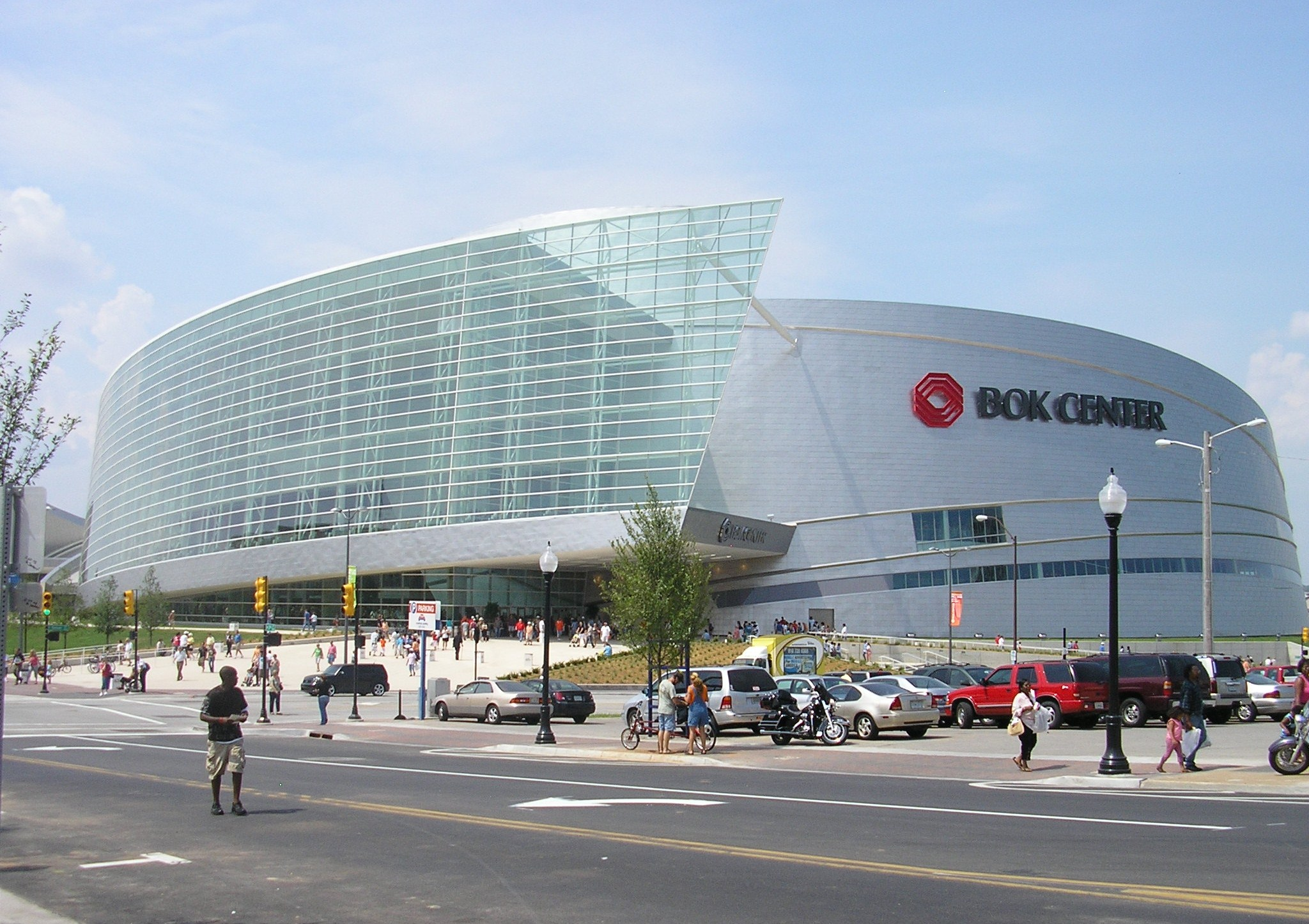
- The BOK Center, the venue of the rally
- Date: June 20, 2020
- Venue: BOK Center
- Location: Tulsa, Oklahoma, U.S.
- Type: Political rally
- Organized by: Donald Trump 2020 presidential campaign
- Participants: ≈6,200

On June 20, 2020, Donald Trump held a rally for his 2020 presidential re-election campaign at the BOK Center in Tulsa, Oklahoma. Amidst the COVID-19 pandemic, the event marked his first public campaign event since March 2020.

Critics and health officials warned that as a large public gathering in a confined indoor space, there was a high probability that new COVID-19 infections could occur at the event due to the lack of social distancing, amidst a recent spike in cases in Oklahoma; attendees were required to not hold the Trump campaign responsible for any COVID-19 exposure at the event. The original scheduling of the rally on June 19 was considered insensitive as it is a day of celebration honoring the emancipation of African Americans, and Tulsa was the site of a race massacre in 1921. Citing these concerns, the Trump campaign later delayed the rally to June 20.

The rally attracted a smaller audience than projected by the Trump campaign, with an estimate of 6,200 by Tulsa's fire department—in comparison to the arena's capacity of around 19,000. An outdoor overflow stage (where Trump and Vice President Mike Pence were also to make appearances) was scrapped due to the lack of turnout. President Trump and other campaign officials alleged that disruptions by "radical" protesters and negative coverage of the rally by news outlets had deterred attendance, although the former claim was disputed by CNN reporters on-scene.

At least eight positive cases of COVID-19 were reported among campaign staff who worked the rally, with six of them reported prior to the event. Following the rally, Trump faced criticism for stating in his speech that he had asked the federal government to "slow down" COVID-19 testing, in order to reduce the number of new U.S. cases. Trump and his staff claimed that the remark was meant to be "tongue-in-cheek", while Trump stated in a June 22 interview that he "does not kid" and that he discussed it with officials but did not outright order the government to do so. The number of daily COVID-19 cases in Oklahoma tripled in the 30 days that followed the rally, while Republican politician Herman Cain died from complications of COVID-19 after attending it.

== Background and preparations ==
On June 10, President Donald Trump announced his intent to host a rally for his 2020 re-election campaign at the BOK Center in Tulsa on June 19, in his first public campaign event since the wider activation of the COVID-19 pandemic in the United States in March 2020.

Concerns were raised that as a large, public gathering held in a confined, indoor space, the rally could exacerbate spread of Coronavirus disease 2019 (COVID-19). Trump stated that Oklahoma had done "a great job with COVID" (despite there having been a recent uptick in cases), while Mayor of Tulsa G. T. Bynum stated that "Tulsans have managed one of the first successful re-openings in the nation, so we can only guess that may be the reason President Trump selected Tulsa as a rally site", but added that the campaign was being encouraged to provide "enhanced hygiene considerations" to comply with state guidelines. Oklahoma has recommended avoiding crowded gatherings, but does not currently enforce limits on their size. The Washington Post cited the rally as part of a growing de-emphasis of the pandemic by the Trump administration.

Trump's campaign director Tim Murtaugh told Fox News that there were plans for safety protocols, but that "I would point out to the national media that I don't remember them doing any social distancing shaming when they were doing all the coverage of the [George Floyd] demonstrations that were going on." Attendees were required to accept a liability waiver, agreeing to not hold the Trump campaign liable for any exposure to COVID-19 that may occur at the rally, citing it as an inherent risk in any public gathering at this time. Trump's former White House Communications Director Anthony Scaramucci felt that the waiver was an example of "two of the great hallmarks of his presidency: Selfish and irresponsible." The campaign later announced plans to perform temperature checks, and to offer face masks and hand sanitizer to all attendees.

Amidst increased support for the Black Lives Matter movement following the murder of George Floyd, the site and scheduling of the rally also faced criticism; Tulsa's Greenwood district was the site of a major race massacre in 1921, while the rally fell on "Juneteenth"—a holiday celebrating the emancipation of enslaved African Americans. Trump's history of racially-charged statements was also noted. On June 13, Trump announced that the rally would be pushed back by one day to June 20. He later attempted to take credit for having made Juneteenth "very famous", claiming that "nobody had ever heard of [it]" before. The campaign also announced plans for overflow capacity at the nearby Cox Business Convention Center.

On June 14, Oklahoma announced its largest single-day increase in cases, at 225. Tulsa County also reported its largest single-day increase since March. On June 18, after initially experiencing technical difficulties preventing the release of COVID-19 totals in the state, the Oklahoma State Department of Health reported that Oklahoma had reached 9,354 cases, an increase of 450, which broke the previous record day-to-day case increase of 259.

On June 15, Vice President Mike Pence and Governor Stitt announced that they would also attend the rally, with Stitt to introduce Trump. Pence stated that the campaign chose to host the event in Oklahoma because they had flattened the curve "in a very real sense", claiming that "their hospital capacity is abundant, [and] the number of cases in Oklahoma has declined precipitously", despite Oklahoma (and several other states where the campaign planned to hold rallies) having seen a recent spike in new cases since they began lifting restrictions and quarantine measures.

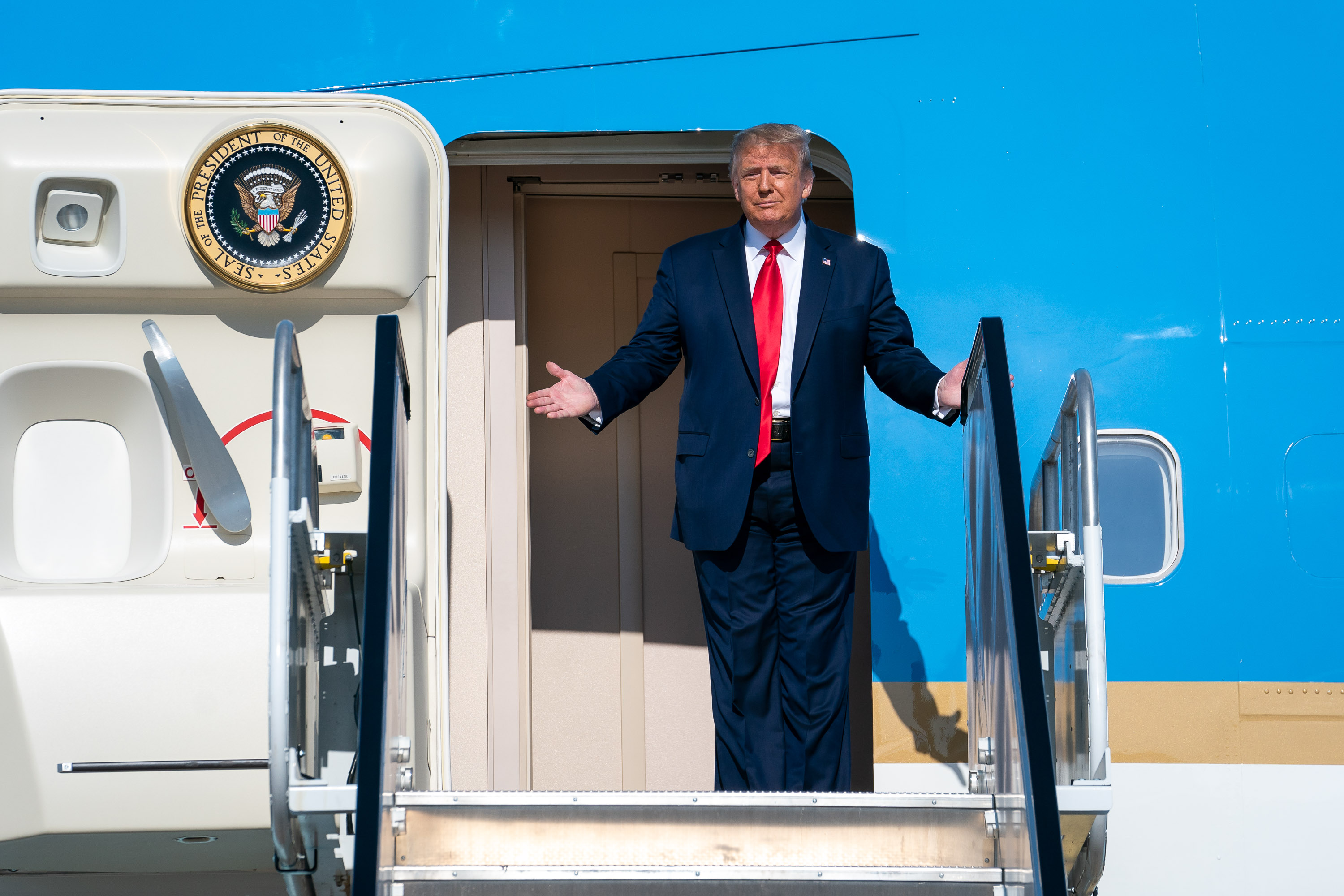
Trump disembarking Air Force One at Tulsa International Airport en route to the rally

In a Q&A, Governor Stitt stated that he was exploring a switch to an outdoor venue, but that the event was currently planned to go on at BOK Center as scheduled, and that it was up to individuals (unless immunocompromised) to choose whether they want to attend because they live in a "free society", but that "we have to learn how to deal with this." Mayor Bynum stated that he would not use his emergency powers to stop the rally. The city's health director Bruce Dart told the Tulsa World that "I think it's an honor for Tulsa to have a sitting president want to come and visit our community, but not during a pandemic. I’m concerned about our ability to protect anyone who attends a large, indoor event, and I’m also concerned about our ability to ensure the president stays safe as well."

On June 18, by request of the chief of police, a curfew was implemented around the site of BOK Center, citing that "individuals from organized groups who have been involved in destructive and violent behavior in other States are planning to travel to the City of Tulsa for purposes of causing unrest in and around the rally." The next day, Mayor Bynum announced that he had rescinded the curfew, stating that it was "no longer necessary".

A lawsuit was filed against BOK Center's management on behalf of businesses and immunocompromised plaintiffs, seeking that it enforce "government mandated social distancing protocols, including the required wearing of masks and reducing attendance so that at least six feet separates each rally-goer while in the arena." On June 19, the Oklahoma Supreme Court rejected the suit. On the day of the rally, six Trump campaign staff members working the rally were tested positive for COVID-19.

The Trump campaign paid more than $2.2 million to hold the rally.

== Speech ==
By the way, it’s a disease, without question [that] has more names than any disease in history. I can name “kung flu.” I can name 19 different versions of names. Many call it a virus, which it is. Many call it a flu. What difference? I think we have 19 or 20 different versions of the name.

— Trump on the COVID-19 pandemic

Trump spoke for 1 hour and 41 minutes; he opened by praising the audience as "warriors" and criticized coverage of the event he perceived as negative. Trump's speech was replete with false claims and many falsehoods he had uttered on previous occasions. Trump said that Coronavirus disease 2019 had "19 different names", including "kung flu", and that calling it COVID-19 "gets further and further away from China as opposed to calling it the Chinese virus.” Trump praised the country's response to the pandemic, and stated that he had asked officials to "slow the testing down", so the country's case numbers would not be high. One-eighth of Trump's speech was devoted to complaining about media coverage of his appearance of the commencement ceremony at the United States Military Academy; Trump asserted that he walked down a stage ramp at West Point slowly because his leather-bottomed shoes were slippery. Trump also repeated false claims regarding his predecessor, Barack Obama; his 2020 opponent, Joe Biden, and Democrats; falsely claimed credit for establishing the VA Choice program (which was actually established by legislation sponsored by John McCain and Bernie Sanders and signed into law by Obama); and exaggerated the scope of the coronavirus-related travel restrictions imposed by his administration.

During the speech, Trump criticized recent calls for the removal of Confederate monuments and contended that "the unhinged left-wing mob is trying to vandalize our history, desecrating our monuments, our beautiful monuments, tear down our statues and punish, cancel and persecute anyone who does not conform to their demands for absolute and total control, we're not conforming." He praised his Supreme Court appointees Neil Gorsuch and Brett Kavanaugh, alleging that Biden would install "extremists" if elected.

== Attendance and viewership ==
The total attendance of the rally would be much lower than was expected by the Trump campaign; roughly a week prior, Trump claimed that "almost one million" people had requested tickets. An outdoor overflow stage which had been built for in-person appearances by Trump and Pence following the in-arena speeches was dismantled just before the rally, while Tulsa's fire department and Trump's campaign each reported crowd estimates of 6,200 and 12,000, respectively — less than the arena's capacity of around 19,000. It was reported that TikTok users and members of K-pop fandoms had credited themselves with falsely requesting tickets for the rally, as part of a coordinated effort to "troll" Trump; earlier, Mary Jo Laupp (who had worked for Pete Buttigieg's campaign for Democratic candidacy in the 2020 presidential election) uploaded a video on TikTok which encouraged viewers to request the Trump camp a ticket and not show up. TikTok users claimed his attempted ban of the social media platform in August 2020—which the administration cited alleged national security concerns related to its ownership by Chinese technology company ByteDance as the basis, and was blocked in two separate lawsuits for violating the Administrative Procedure Act and First Amendment exemptions to the International Emergency Economic Powers Act's sanctioning authority—was retaliation for the prank.

CNN, Fox News, and MSNBC all carried coverage of the rally, with Fox News being the only one among the three to carry Trump's address live. Fox News recorded an average of 7.7 million viewers that night (peaking at 8.2 near the 9:00 p.m. EDT hour), which it stated was its highest Saturday primetime viewership in network history.

== Aftermath ==
=== COVID-19 impacts ===
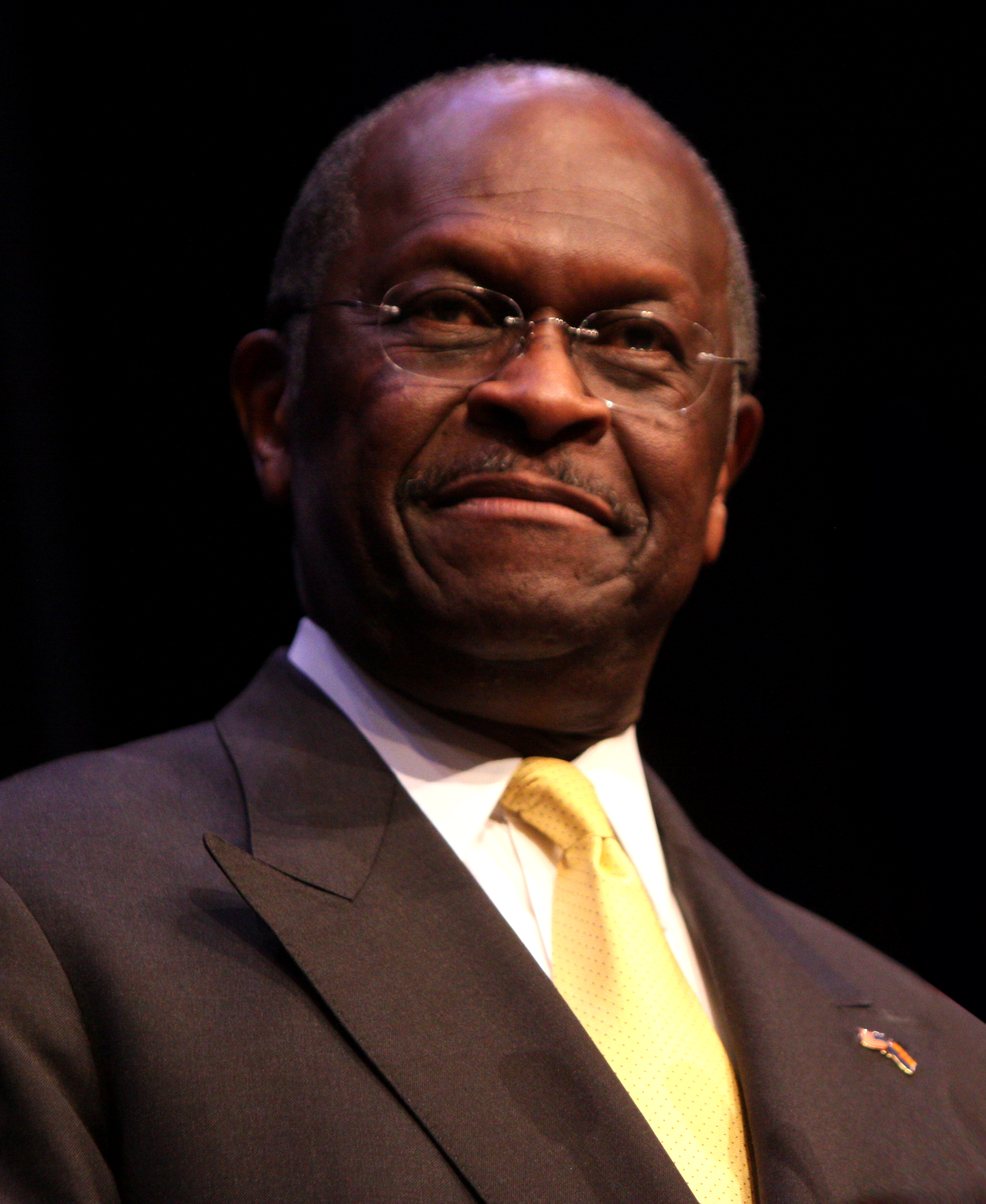
Herman Cain died on July 30, 2020.

Shortly before the rally, Trump campaign staffers, at the direction of the campaign, removed "Do Not Sit Here, Please!" stickers from arena seats; the stickers were intended to ensure social distancing between rally attendees. The removal of the stickers contradicted instructions from arena management. Few attendees at the rally practiced social distancing or wore face masks. Following the rally, two additional Trump campaign staffers, two Secret Service agents, Oklahoma Watch reporter Paul Monies (a journalist who attended the rally) and Herman Cain (who also attended the rally and tested negative for the virus immediately before entering the rally); tested positive for COVID-19. Cain tested positive on June 29, was hospitalized on July 1, and died from complications of the virus on July 30, 2020. After two Secret Service agents who were at the rally tested positive, dozens of agents were asked to self-isolate; the Secret Service did not say how many of its employees were infected or isolating.

On July 3, Trump campaign official Kimberly Guilfoyle, the girlfriend of Donald Trump Jr., tested positive for COVID-19. She had attended the Tulsa rally and Trump's rally in Phoenix, Arizona on June 23, and then traveled to South Dakota intending to attend a Trump-related fireworks celebration at Mount Rushmore in South Dakota. Since she was diagnosed as infected earlier on the day of the South Dakota event, she did not attend it.

In the 30-day period after the rally, the rate of new COVID-19 cases in Oklahoma more than tripled, to 513 cases per day.

=== Trump administration reactions ===
Trump was reportedly "furious" over the low attendance of the rally; campaign manager Brad Parscale argued that "a week's worth of the fake news media warning people away from the rally because of COVID and protesters" had deterred attendance, while Murtaugh accused "radical protesters, coupled with a relentless onslaught from the media", of attempting to "frighten" Trump's supporters. On Fox News Sunday the following morning, campaign advisor Mercedes Schlapp similarly accused protesters of having "blocked the paths" to the venue to deter attendance. However, besides a group of anti-Trump protesters near a security checkpoint, as well as one of the venue entrances being temporarily closed after an attempt to block it, CNN reporters on-scene observed relatively few disruptions. It was also reported that Trump had criticized the decision to publicize positive cases among his staff prior to the rally.

Trump advisor Peter Navarro claimed that Trump's "slow the testing down" remark was meant to be tongue-in-cheek. When asked about the remarks by a reporter on June 22, Trump replied "I don't kid, let me just tell you." In an interview with CBN News aired later that evening, Trump denied that he had directly ordered his administration to reduce testing (calling his remark in the speech "semi tongue-in-cheek"). Trump added, however, that he did suggest to "[his] people" that doing fewer tests would make the United States look like it was "doing much better", but that "I wouldn't do that, but I will say this: we do so much more [testing] than other countries it makes us, in a way, look bad but actually we're doing the right thing."

In testimony to the House of Representatives following the rally, Director of the National Institute of Allergy and Infectious Diseases (NIAID) Anthony Fauci denied that Trump officials had asked them to "slow down" testing.

== See also ==
- 2020 Salute to America
- List of post–2016 election Donald Trump rallies
- South Dakota's Mount Rushmore Fireworks Celebration 2020
- White House COVID-19 outbreak
