= Blue Creek (California) =

- Location of Blue Creek in California
- Native name: ʼErnerrʼ ʼWe-Roy (Yurok)

Location
- Country: United States
- State: California

Physical characteristics
- Source: Elk Valley
  - location: Siskiyou Wilderness, Del Norte County
  - coordinates: 41°35′33″N 123°42′39″W
  - elevation: 5,080 ft (1,550 m)
- Mouth: Klamath River
  - location: About 10 mi (16 km) SE of Klamath, Humboldt County
  - coordinates: 41°25′27″N 123°55′42″W
  - elevation: 69 ft (21 m)
- Length: 23 mi (37 km)
- Basin size: 73 sq mi (190 km^{2})

Blue Creek (Yurok: ʼErnerrʼ ʼWe-Roy) is a 23-mile (37 km) long stream in the Northern Coast Ranges of California, and is the lowermost major tributary of the Klamath River. The creek begins in Elk Valley, in the Siskiyou Wilderness of the Six Rivers National Forest in Del Norte County. It flows southwest, receiving several major tributaries including the East Fork, Crescent City Fork, Nickowitz Creek, Slide Creek and the West Fork. It flows into the Klamath River in Humboldt County, 16 miles (26 km) upstream from where the Klamath empties into the Pacific Ocean.

The Blue Creek watershed covers about 47,000 acres (19,000 ha) and is considered one of the most pristine areas in the Klamath River Basin. The area is within the historic territory of the Yurok people. During the 19th and early 20th centuries the Blue Creek valley was subject to intensive logging, but the area has begun to recover with recent conservation efforts by the Yurok Tribe.

The confluence of Blue Creek with the Klamath River is directly downstream from the original planned site of Ah Pah Dam, a massive structure proposed in the 1950s which would have diverted the Klamath River to Southern California. In October 2024, other dams along the Klamath River were removed.

== Conservation ==
In 2011, the nonprofit Western Rivers Conservancy (WRC) and the Yurok Tribe established a long-term partnership to buy 47,097 acres along Blue Creek and the lower Klamath from Green Diamond Resource Company. Nearly a decade later, WRC and the Yurok Tribe succeeded in creating the Blue Creek Salmon Sanctuary and Yurok Tribal Community Forest, protecting the entire lower half of Blue Creek, from the edge of the Siskiyou Wilderness (where the upper half of the stream is already protected), to its confluence with the Klamath River. Through the project, WRC and the Yurok Tribe more than doubled the size of the Yurok's landholdings by returning ancestral homelands to the tribe. The Yurok Tribe is now managing the lands to recover forests that were harvested for decades.

In June 2025, the land purchases to create the Blue Creek Salmon Sanctuary and Yurok Tribal Community Forest were completed and formally transferred to the Yurok Tribe’s stewardship, in what has been described as the largest land back conservation action in California’s history. The Tribe intends to restore the watershed and forest to revert the environmental damage from timber industry. Using Indigenous ecological management, the Yurok Tribe hopes to see a return of old-growth forest, salmon populations, and other endangered species.

Blue Creek is a critical migration point for salmon and steelhead in the Klamath River watershed. Summer water temperatures in Blue Creek are typically lower than the main stem Klamath; migrating fish can lower their body temperature by up to eight degrees Fahrenheit by resting in and at the mouth of Blue Creek, increasing their chances of survival during their upriver migration. Without this cool-down period, most summer and fall Chinook would likely die before reaching their spawning grounds in the upper Klamath River. Blue Creek itself, with no dams or diversions, also provides good spawning habitat for these fish.

== See also ==
- List of rivers of California
- Indigenous and community conserved area
