= Seizure of the Black Hills =

Land dispute between Native Americans and the US government

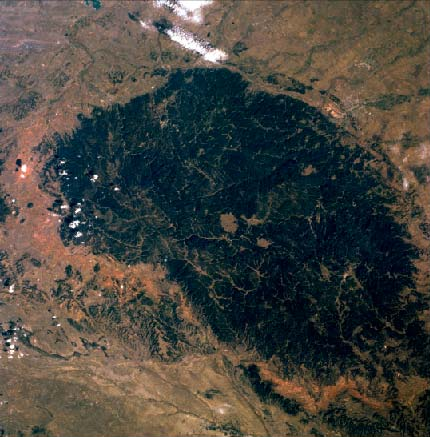
The Black Hills, South Dakota, United States image from space.

The United States government illegally seized the Black Hills – a mountain range in the US states of South Dakota and Wyoming – from the Sioux Nation in 1876. The land was pledged to the Sioux Nation in the Treaty of Fort Laramie, but a few years later the United States illegally seized the land and nullified the treaty with the Indian Appropriations Bill of 1876, without the tribe's consent. That bill "denied the Sioux all further appropriation and treaty-guaranteed annuities" until they gave up the Black Hills. A Supreme Court case was ruled in favor of the Sioux in 1980. As of 2011, the court's award was worth over $1 billion, but the Sioux have outstanding issues with the ruling and have not collected the funds.

The Sioux tribes eventually managed to purchase a portion, 1,900 acres (8 km^{2}) out of the total 6,000 square miles (16,000 km^{2}) of disputed land in western South Dakota and northeastern Wyoming, in November 2012 which included the sacred Pe' Sla site. The Pe Sla' site's federal Indian trust status, which was granted by the Bureau of Indian Affairs in 2016, was acknowledged by Pennington County in 2017. In 2016 and 2018, some Cheyenne and Sioux tribes managed to purchase land near the sacred Bear Butte, which serves as a state park.

== Background ==
The Black Hills, the United States' second oldest mountain range, is 125 miles (201 km) long and 65 miles (105 km) wide stretching across South Dakota and Wyoming. The Black Hills derived its name from the black image that is produced by the "thick forest of pine and spruce trees" that covers the hills and was given the name by the Native Americans belonging to the Lakota (Sioux). The Lakota Sioux settled the area in about 1765 after being pushed out of Wisconsin and Minnesota by European settlers and Chippewa tribes. The tribe quickly adapted to plains-life, with the bison at the center of their culture.

The Great Sioux Reservation, including the Black Hills, was "set apart for the absolute and undisturbed use and occupation of the Indians" in the Fort Laramie Treaty of April 29, 1868. Those treaties were not upheld by the United States, and the Sioux Nation was eventually forcibly removed. The Supreme Court ruled in 1980 (US v Sioux Nation) that the Sioux Nation never received just compensation for their land, writing "a more ripe and rank case of dishonorable dealings will never, in all probability, be found in our history." The Court concluded that Congress had failed to "makes a good faith effort to give the Indians the full value of the land." The Court ordered "just compensation to the Sioux Nation, and that obligation, including an award of interest, must now, at last, be paid." However, the Sioux Nation refused the monetary award, stating that their goal was return of the land.

The land of the Black Hills has a United States federal government presence where it is home to five national parks: Mount Rushmore National Memorial, Badlands National Park, Devils Tower National Monument, Jewel Cave National Monument and Wind Cave National Park. Black Elk Peak, formerly Harney Peak, is the highest summit of the Black Hills at 7,242 feet (2,207 m) and is located within the 1,247,209 acres (5,047 km^{2}) of the Black Hills National Forest. Black Elk Peak is a Lakota religious landmark and a popular hiking destination.

The presence of Native Americans in the Black Hills is represented by the Crazy Horse Memorial, which is a carved sculpture in the mountains of the martyred Lakota leader, Crazy Horse. The sculpture is designed to symbolize the culture, tradition and living heritage of North American Indians although its construction has been controversial within the tribe.

=== Religion and the Black Hills ===
The Lakotas, Cheyennes, Arapahos, Kiowas and Kiowa-Apaches believe the land to be sacred. Specific locations in and near the Black Hills considered as sacred include Bear Lodge Butte (Devils Tower), Bear Butte, the Racetrack or Red Valley, Buffalo Gap, Craven Canyon, Gillette Prairie, the Hot Springs-Minnekahta area, lnyan Kara Mountain, Black Elk Peak, Black Buttes, White Butte, and Rapid Creek Valley. Most of these places are part of the traditional histories of the tribes, some related to extensive migrations in pre contact times. For the Lakota, the Black Hills were frequently used for the individual vision quests, and through them some people even learned ritual and songs of the Sun Dance.

Their religion holds that traditional religious ceremonies should be held within the Black Hills, though by necessity they are now held inside and outside of the Black Hills. Some outsiders use the latter fact to conclude that the land is not needed to perform the ceremonies.

The land has significant resources and minerals, which was the primary driver for its seizure in the mid-1800s, and an important factor in why many people oppose its return to the Lakota. Some believe that the Sioux did not willingly choose to inhabit the Black Hills, but were forced on to the land by military conquest of other tribes. If the Black Hills were not originally inhabited by the Sioux, they conclude, the Sioux have no rights to the land. However, the Fort Laramie Treaty between the United States and the Sioux Nation unambiguously recognized their ownership of the land.

== History ==
=== First encounters ===
The Arikara arrived by AD 1500, followed by the Cheyenne, Crow, Kiowa and Arapaho. The Lakota (also known as Sioux) arrived from Minnesota in the 18th century and drove out the other tribes, who moved west. They claimed the land, which they called Pahá Sápa (Black Mountains). The mountains commonly became known as the Black Hills.

The Lakota did not come across a United States governmental spokesperson until the Lewis and Clark Expedition in 1804 near the Missouri River. The two men refrained from entering the Black Hills because they lacked governmental jurisdiction and feared the deadly consequences of entering sacred land. Moreover, the Teton Sioux first embraced Lewis and Clark with gifts and food and in return, Lewis and Clark notified the Indians that the United States controlled much of the Sioux lands under the newly obtained Louisiana Territory by distributing medals to symbolize peace and American citizenship.

The Lewis and Clark expedition led to the formation of the Missouri and American fur companies in 1808. As a result, the United States regulated trade outside of the Black Hills. To maintain peace, the United States government offered the Sioux full protection from harm and of property as well as gave the Sioux permission to hand over intruders to the United States government for further punishment. The sacredness of the Black Hills kept intruders out until Jedediah Smith's expedition of 15 traders into the Black Hills in 1823.

=== Origin of the land claim ===
In 1849 the Californian Gold Rush attracted many prospectors, who sometimes encroached on sacred Sioux grounds while headed for the Oregon Trail. As a result, the Treaty of Fort Laramie (1851) was formed to establish land rights and maintain peace between travelling miners and the Cheyenne, Sioux, Arapaho, Crow, Assiniboine, Mandan, Hidatsa, and Arikara nations. Under this treaty, the formation of reservations began where pieces of allotted land were distributed to the several tribes.

The treaty recognized the Sioux territory of the Black Hills which were located between the North Platte River and Yellowstone River and obligated the government to pay $50,000 annually. However, a United States military war against Red Cloud proved to be a victory for the Sioux, which resulted in the Treaty of Fort Laramie (1868). This treaty ultimately protected the Black Hills from white settlement.

The treaty was violated when gold was discovered in Montana in 1874. However, the Sioux did not face intruders until Brevet Major General George Armstrong Custer and his army entered the Black Hills in 1874 and publicly announced their discovery of gold. By 1875 the announcement led to the establishment of large mining towns, such as Deadwood, Central City and Lead within the Black Hills. Accordingly, the United States unilaterally imposed the Manypenny Agreement, claimed the land, and officially removed the Black Hills from the Sioux Reservation by passing the Congressional Act of February 28, 1877. (19 Stat., 254)

== Land rights and treaties ==
=== 1851 Fort Laramie Treaty ===
Congress passed an appropriations bill in February 1851 to allow Commissioner of Indian Affairs Luke Lea to negotiate with the Native Americans living on the Black Hills. The Fort Laramie Treaty was developed to prevent further harm of the natural resources in the Black Hills that were damaged by miners travelling to California. The treaty also developed boundaries for the Sioux and promoted peace between white settlers and plain Indians. Consequently, the treaty favoured United States expansionism when the Sioux agreed to the development of railroads and trails within their territory.

In contrast, the treaty did prove beneficial to the Sioux nation, where the government agreed to pay the tribe $50,000 each year for 50 years and recognized land rights of the Sioux and their right to self-governance within their boundaries. However, the United States violated the treaty a year later on May 24, 1852, when the United States Senate shortened the annual payment of $50,000 from a fifty-year term to a ten-year term.

=== 1868 Fort Laramie Treaty ===
On December 21, 1866, a supply train travelling on Bozeman Trail was attacked by Sioux Indians. Later that day, a small force of 80 American soldiers under Captain William J. Fetterman was ambushed and destroyed outside Fort Kearny by 2,000 Sioux warriors led by Red Cloud. The Fetterman Fight was the biggest battle of Red Cloud's War.

Since Red Cloud had vastly superior forces and better logistics in this remote area of Montana, the United States Congress responded on July 20, 1867, by creating the Indian Peace Commission. A peace expedition was led by Lieutenant General William Tecumseh Sherman. While negotiating, Sioux Indian Spotted Tail, representing the Indians of Powder River stated "We object to the Powder River road. The country which we live in is cut up by white men, who drive away all the game. That is the cause of our troubles." General Sherman responded by saying that the government would not close down the trail but would compensate the Indians for any damages travelers may have caused to the land. Red Cloud hesitated to sign the treaty, but eventually agreed to the terms on November 6, 1868.

The conflict was essentially driven by economic development. The indigenous hunter gatherer peoples needed millions of acres of productive hunting grounds to feed themselves, while virtually any modern economic development like farming, ranching, mining, transportation, and population growth ruined the hunting grounds for the indigenous people. At the same time, indigenous people desired modern things like weapons, tools, and clothing, but they had no cash. As a result, they often resorted to robbing and killing white settlers, which led to continuing conflicts with the US government.

In relation to the Black Hills land claim, Article 2 established the Great Sioux Reservation and placed restrictions on hunting lands. Article 11 of the treaty states that "parties to this agreement hereby stipulate that they will relinquish all right to occupy permanently the territory outside their reservation as herein defined, but yet reserve the right to hunt on any lands north of North Platte and on the Republican Fork of the Smoky Hill River." Article 12, which remains standing today, declared that future land cessions would require the signatures of at least three-fourths of native American occupants.

Shortly after the signing of the treaty, two tribes residing near Republican Fork killed several white settlers, who were illegally encroaching on Sioux land. This resulted in another violation of the treaty where the United States removed Sioux land rights to the Republican Fork.

=== "Sell or Starve" and the Act of 1877 ===
After the defeat at the Battle of the Little Bighorn in June 1876, Congress responded by attaching what the Sioux call the "sell or starve" rider (19 Stat. 192) to the Indian Appropriations Act of 1876 (19 Stat. 176, enacted August 15, 1876) which cut off all rations for the Sioux until they terminated hostilities and ceded the Black Hills to the United States.

The Agreement of 1877, also known as the Act of February 28, 1877 (19 Stat. 254), is the most controversial treaty regarding the Black Hills land claims. The treaty officially took away Sioux land, and permanently established Indian reservations. Article 1 of the act modifies the boundaries of reservations stated in the 1868 Fort Laramie Treaty, while Article 2 allows the United States government to establish roads for settlers to travel upon when crossing the territory. Also, Article 7 states that only full blood Indians residing on the reservation are allowed to the agreements and benefits from this act as well as past treaties. The controversies around this act state that the government purchased the land from the reservation but there is no valid record of this transaction.

This act was also in violation of Article 12 of the 1868 Fort Laramie Treaty and consequently became a central point of contestation for land rights over the Black Hills.

== Attempts to reinstate claim ==
The legal struggle for the Black Hills land claim began in the early 1920s under tribal lawyer Richard Case where he argued that the 1877 Act of February was illegal and that the United States never made a legitimate purchase of the land. Tribal Lawyers Marvin Sonosky and Arthur Lazarus took over the case in 1956 until they won in 1980. Despite this legal victory, the Sioux refused to accept payment for the land and the dispute over the Black Hills continues to this day.

=== 1979 ===
The United States Court of Claims on June 13, 1979, in a 5–2 majority, decided that the 1877 Act that seized the Black Hills from the Sioux was a violation of the Fifth Amendment.

On July 31, 1979, the Sioux were awarded $17.5 million with 5 percent interest totaling $105 million. However, the victory was short lived. The Sioux declined to accept the money, because acceptance would legally terminate Sioux demands for return of the Black Hills. The money remains in a Bureau of Indian Affairs account accruing compound interest. As of 2011, the Sioux's award plus interest was "about $1 billion" or "1.3 billion" (equivalent to $1.14-$1.48 billion in 2019).

Furthermore, the two lawyers continued to work with the government to provide the tribe with just compensation for violating the 1868 Fort Laramie Treaty. In September 1979, Sonosky and Lazarus offered the tribe $44 million as a settlement for the violation in 1868, but were met with hostility.

On October 17, 1979, Solicitor General Wade McCree of the Justice Department sent an appeal to the United States Supreme Court over the initial ruling by the Court of Claims and on November 21, 1979, the Supreme Court set a date to review the claim and on December 10, the appeal was granted.

=== 1980 - Supreme Court case ===
The Supreme Court case United States v. Sioux Nation of Indians was argued on March 24, 1980. On June 30, 1980, the United States Supreme Court ruled in an 8–1 majority to uphold the United States Court of Claims' initial ruling, awarding the Sioux nation $106 million, which resulted in the largest sum ever given to an Indian tribe for illegally seized territory.

However, a complaint was filed to the United States District Court on July 1, 1980, by a member of the Sioux tribe asking the United States Supreme Court to prevent Arthur Lazarus from accepting any compensation that was awarded on behalf of the tribe.

The tribe stated that they did not sign a legal contract with Lazarus, and that he did not represent their view.

On July 9, 1980, in a unanimous decision, the Sioux tribal council refused to accept $106 million award to them. The tribal council argued that "the Supreme Court decision should be vacated on the grounds that the Tribe was not represented in those proceedings."

=== 1981 ===
On July 18, 1981, Mario Gonzalez filed a lawsuit asking for 7,300,000 acres (30,000 km^{2}) of the Black Hills in South Dakota and $11 billion in damages. $1 billion was demanded as compensation for “hunger, malnutrition, disease, and death,” while the remaining $10 billion in damages covered previous extraction of nonrenewable resources from the Black Hills

A New York Times article "Around the Nation: Appeal Court Rejects Suit, By Indians Over Black Hills" on June 3, 1981, stated that a United States Federal appeals court denied the terms of the lawsuit and ruled that the Indian Claims Commission was the only mechanism Congress has authorized for hearing land cases of this type, and it was now terminated.

On October 6, Arthur Lazarus filed for attorney fees for himself and the two other lawyers, Howard Payne and Marvin J. Sonosky, who participated in the United States v. Sioux Nation of Indians but were never paid. On May 21, 1981, the United States Court of Claims granted the three lawyers with 10 percent of the $106 million awarded, which totaled $10.6 million. However, many Sioux Indians disagreed with the awarded fees and believed that the lawyers deserved nothing because the tribes did not want money as a form of compensation.

The issue of land over money as compensation continued through 1981. In April, 40 Indians constructed a camp in Yellow Camp, located in the Black Hills to protest the United States Forest Service's removal of all Indians living on that territory by September 8 of that year; however, they did not succeed.

=== 1982 ===
The appeal brought by Pine Ridge Indian Reservation, in 1981 for 7,300,000 acres (30,000 km^{2}) of South Dakota Black Hills land and $11 billion was denied by the United States Supreme Court and resulted in the involvement of the United Nations which was investigating if this denial breached international law.

=== 1983 ===
After several denials of appeals brought by tribal lawyer Mario Gonzalez, the Black Hills Steering Committee was formed. The committee drafted a bill for Congress that asked for the 7,300,000 acres (30,000 km^{2}) of the Black Hills in South Dakota. At the time, the committee's coordinator stated that "the bill would give the Sioux all Federal land in the area, roughly two million acres." Under the bill, the Black Hills Steering Committee promised to keep all federal employees that worked on the Black Hills.

=== 1985–1990 ===
In 1987, Senator Bill Bradley introduced a bill that would have returned some of the land. It died in committee. In 1990, following input from Sioux elders, Matthew G. Martínez proposed a bill that would have returned the entire area designated by the treaty; this also died in committee.

=== 2009 ===
In April 2009, several tribe members filed a suit saying they wanted to receive money and not the land as compensation. They claimed that 5,000 tribal members signed on with the lawsuit but didn't want to be named. The lawsuit was dismissed in 2011.

On June 30, 2009, the Rosebud Sioux and Oglala Sioux tribes called for a meeting to discuss the split issues regarding just compensation for the Black Hills. Meetings continued through 2011.

In August 2009, the Obama administration talked about settling the Black Hills land claim dispute. In a press statement, President Barack Obama gave hope of government negotiations and Native American self-determination. A tribal analysis stated that President Obama "is a strong believer in tribal sovereignty. He does not believe court or the federal government should force Sioux tribes to take settlement money for the Black Hills. He believes that tribes are best suited to decide how to handle the monetary award themselves."

The Sioux reported re-emerging with new faith and a readiness to start working with President Barack Obama where they have publicly announced their eagerness for "government to government negotiations to explore innovative solutions to resolve the long-standing dispute over the sacred Black Hills in a fair and honourable manner."

There is no current government activity on the Black Hills. However, on November 5, 2009, President Obama stated to the Native American population that "You deserve to have a voice," and "You will not be forgotten as long as I'm in this White House." This statement occurred after President Obama's signature on a bill allowing agencies to submit paperwork in regards to methods and efforts of allowing Native American tribes to participate in and influence decisions in United States policies regarding tribal life.

=== 2012 ===
In 2012, United Nations special rapporteur James Anaya conducted a twelve-day tour of Native American lands, to determine how well the United States was following the United Nations Declaration on the Rights of Indigenous Peoples, endorsed by the administration of President Barack Obama in 2010. Anaya met with tribes in seven states on reservations and in urban areas, as well as with members of the Obama administration and the Senate Committee on Indian Affairs. Anaya tentatively recommended the return of lands to some tribes, including the Black Hills to the Sioux. His full official report with recommendations was released in mid-2012. Anaya also brought a sale of over 1,900 acres (7.7 km^{2}) of land in Black Hills by the Reynolds family to the attention of the U.S. government and asked that it disclose measures taken by federal or state governments to address Sioux concerns over the sale of the land within Reynolds Prairie. These acres consist of five land tracts, including the sacred Pe' Sla site for Dakota, Lakota, and Nakota peoples; natives to the Black Hills fundraised to buy the land during the Reynolds' sale. On January 15, 2013, the U.S. responded, telling Anaya that it "understands several tribes purchased the Pe' Sla sacred site around November 30, 2012" meaning the Pe' Sla is officially Sioux land.

=== 2016 ===
On March 10, 2016, the United States Department of the Interior's Bureau of Indian Affairs informed the Great Sioux Nation (Oceti Sakowin) of its decision to take Pe’ Sla, a 2,200 acres (8.9 km^{2}) sacred site in the Black Hills of South Dakota, into federal Indian trust status. On March 14, four days after Pe' Sla was granted a Federal Indian trust, the Shakopee Mdewakanton Sioux tribe released a statement which acknowledged that 1,900 acres (7.7 km^{2}) of Pe' Sla (also known as Reynolds Prairie) was jointly purchased in 2012 by the Rosebud, Shakopee Mdewakanton, Crow Creek, and Standing Rock Sioux Tribes. On October 30, the Southern Cheyenne and Arapaho Tribe of Oklahoma, the Northern Cheyenne Tribe of Montana and the Rosebud Sioux Tribe of South Dakota successfully purchased land near the sacred Bear Butte for $1.1 million at an auction.

=== 2017 ===
On March 24, 2017, Pennington County agreed to end its dispute over Pe' Sla's Federal Indian status.

=== 2018 ===
On November 7, 2018, 1,020 acres (1.59 sq mi) of land near Bear Butte were sold to the Northern Cheyenne Tribe of Montana and the Arapahoe Tribe of Oklahoma for $2.3 million.

=== 2020 ===
Activists led by NDN Collective protested at a President Donald J. Trump campaign rally, and amplified Land Back, a movement to return indigenous land to indigenous ownership.

== Bibliography ==
- Barkan, Elazar (2000). "The Guilt of Nations: Restitution and Negotiating Historical Injustices". The American Journal of International Law. 95 (3). New York: Norton: 414. doi:10.2307/2668527. ISBN 978-0-393-04886-5. JSTOR 2668527. S2CID 143605692.
- Lazarus, Edward (1991). Black Hills/White Justice: The Sioux Nation versus the United States, 1775 to the Present. New York: HarperCollins. p. 492. ISBN 978-0-8032-7987-2.
- Sundstrom, Linea (1997). "The sacred Black Hills: an ethnohistorical review". Great Plains Quarterly. 17 (3/4): 185–212.
- Weinstein, Allen (2002). The Story of America: Freedom and Crisis From Settlement to Superpower. New York: DK Publishing Co. pp. 688. ISBN 978-0-7894-8903-6. OCLC 50985159.
