= Manypenny =

Manypenny is a surname. Notable people with the surname include:

- George Washington Manypenny (1808–1892), American government official and newspaperman
- Mike Manypenny (born 1959), American politician

== See also ==
- Manypenny Agreement
