= Land Back =

Movement by Indigenous peoples to reclaim ancestral lands

Map of Indian Land Areas Judicially Established by 1978, as determined by the Indian Claims Commission, and American Indian Reservations. Restoring tribal sovereignty in these areas are often the focus of Land Back movements by Native American governments and activists.

Land Back is a decentralised campaign that began in the 20th century among Indigenous peoples worldwide who seek to reestablish Indigenous sovereignty, with political and economic control of their ancestral lands. Land Back is part of a broader Indigenous movement for decolonization.

The United States federal government's return of land to the Navajo Nation in the 1868 Treaty of Bosque Redondo was the first major instance of Land Back in the history of the United States. The United States Congress aimed to compensate Tribal governments for their land with money damages rather than returning land when it established the Indian Claims Commission, active from 1946 to 1978. However, Taos Pueblo refused to accept this and launched a nationwide campaign for the return of their sacred Blue Lake. In 1970 the United States federal government returned Blue Lake to Taos Pueblo in the first successful contemporary instance of Land Back and a major success of the American Indian Movement.

The return of Blue Lake to Taos Pueblo coincided with a new, contemporary Native Self-Determination Era amongst the Native Americans in the United States. The 1980 United States Supreme Court case United States v. Sioux Nation of Indians was seen as a setback for the movement, as the Court recognized the federal government had taken land from the Sioux Nation but offered monetary compensation, which was declined. Since the 1960s, the Land Back movement has spread to other Native American federally recognized tribal governments, Indigenous peoples of Mexico, Indigenous peoples in Canada, Indigenous Australians, Māori people, Fijians, and many other indigenous peoples in different countries.

Land Back's prominence has increased in the 21st century. In the 2010s the Land Back movement was often marked with the hashtag #LandBack. The pace of successful instances of Land Back has accelerated in the 2020s in several different countries.

== Description ==
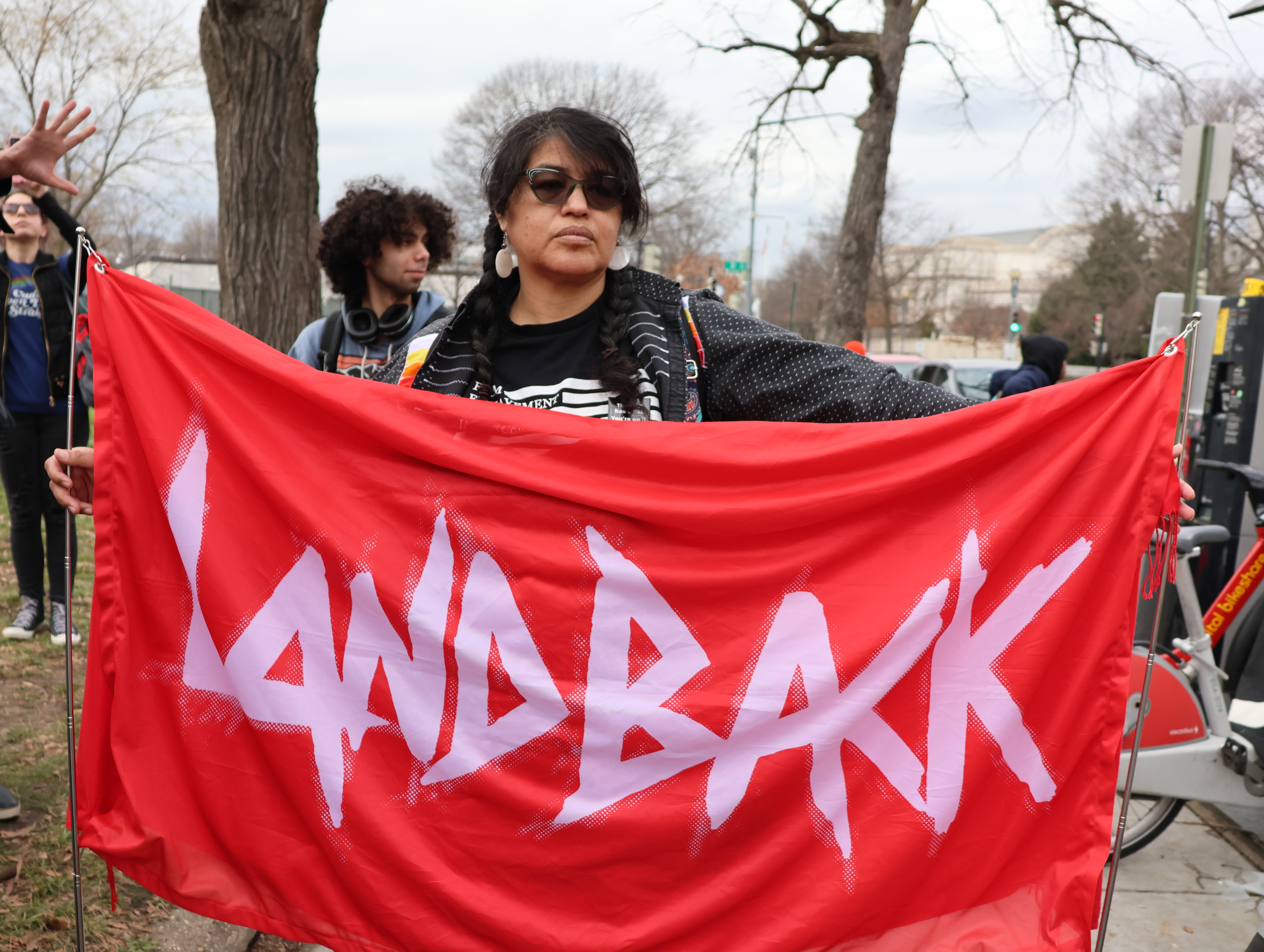
Land Back banner at a protest in Washington, D.C., 2024

The Land Back movement seeks to restore Indigenous political authority over unceded ancestral lands. Scholars from the Indigenous-run Yellowhead Institute at Toronto Metropolitan University describe it as a process of reclaiming Indigenous jurisdiction. The NDN Collective describes it as synonymous with decolonization and dismantling white supremacy. Land Back advocates for Indigenous rights, preserves languages and traditions, and works toward food sovereignty, decent housing, and a clean environment.

Activists have also used the Land Back framework in Mexico, and scholars have applied it in New Zealand and Fiji. Land Back is part of a broader Indigenous movement for decolonization.

== Philosophy ==
The NDN Collective describes the Land Back campaign as a metanarrative that ties together many different Indigenous organizations similar to the Black Lives Matter campaign. They say that the campaign enables decentralised Indigenous leadership and addresses structural racism faced by Indigenous people that is rooted in theft of their land. Land Back emphasizes Indigenous groups’ physical and spiritual connection to their ancestral lands, and the importance of reviving the knowledge and practices that have sustained their people for generations.

Land Back is a movement that advocates for the restoration of communal ownership of traditional and unceded Indigenous lands, while rejecting colonial concepts of real estate and private property. Seeking the return of land is not solely driven by economic interest. The intent is to reestablish important cultural ties between people and place, revitalize ancient cultural practices connected with the land, and restore Indigenous self-determination and sovereignty. When Indigenous communities regain access to ancestral lands, they are empowered to re-engage with traditional foods, medicines, languages and cultural practices, and these activities promote community well-being and cultural continuity.

In some cases Land Back promotes a land tax that seeks to collect revenue on people who are of non-indigenous origins.

== Methods ==
In the United States, Tribal governments and activists point to the Supremacy Clause to enforce Tribal sovereignty according to treaties between federally recognized tribes and the United States federal government, as they "shall be the supreme Law of the Land." The full clause reads:

This Constitution, and the Laws of the United States which shall be made in Pursuance thereof; and all Treaties made, or which shall be made, under the Authority of the United States, shall be the supreme Law of the Land; and the Judges in every State shall be bound thereby, any thing in the Constitution or Laws of any State to the Contrary notwithstanding.

In some cases, land is directly returned to Indigenous people when private landowners, municipalities, or governments give the land back to Indigenous tribes. This may take the form of a real estate transaction. In other cases, the transfer of ownership of the land may not be feasible. Co-management of public lands has emerged as a means for Indigenous voices to be consulted concerning the stewardship and use of ancestral lands.

Indigenous-led projects may also use community land trusts to reserve lands for their group.

== History ==
The Land Back movement has witnessed numerous campaigns, often culminating in the return of land to Indigenous stewardship. The following are a number of notable cases listed in chronological order, but this list is not comprehensive.

=== Navajo Nation ===
The Long Walk of the Navajo was the deportation and forced relocation of the Navajo people by the United States federal government and the United States army. Navajos were forced to walk from their land in western New Mexico Territory (modern-day Arizona and New Mexico) to Bosque Redondo in eastern New Mexico. Some 53 different forced marches occurred between August 1864 and the end of 1866. In total, 10,000 Navajos and 500 Mescalero Apache were forced to the internment camp in Bosque Redondo. During the forced march and internment, up to 3,500 people died from starvation and disease over a four-year period. In 1868, the Navajo were allowed to return to their ancestral homeland following the Treaty of Bosque Redondo. Some anthropologists state that the "collective trauma of the Long Walk ... is critical to contemporary Navajos' sense of identity as a people".

=== Indian Claims Commission ===
The Indian Claims Commission was a judicial relations arbiter between the United States federal government and Native American tribes. It was established under the Indian Claims Act of 1946 by the United States Congress to hear any longstanding claims of Indigenous tribes against the United States. The Commission created a process for tribes to address their grievances against the United States, and offered monetary compensation for territory lost as a result of broken federal treaties. Its purpose was to serve as a tribunal for hearing claims against the United States arising prior to that date by any Native American tribe or other identifiable group of Indigenous people living in the United States.

The Commission was created on August 13, 1946, after nearly 20 years of Congressional debates. In this it exercised primary jurisdiction that formerly rested with the United States Court of Claims. The Court of Claims had jurisdiction over claims arising after August 13, 1946 and subsequently after the ICC ended its operations on April 10, 1977 on any claims filed with the ICC and not yet fully resolved. The Commission was conceived as way to thank Native Americans for their unprecedented service in World War II and as a way to relieve the anxiety and resentment caused by the United States' history of colonization of indigenous peoples. The 1946 act allowed any "identifiable" group of native descendants to bring a cause of action, without regard to their federal recognition status. This led to many neglected Indian groups in the Southeast, the Northeast, and California organized tribal governments in order to pursue their claims, particularly for land. However, by accepting the government's monetary offer, the aggrieved tribe abdicated any right to raise their claim again in the future. On occasion, a tribe gave up federal recognition as part of the settlement of a claim.

The Commission was adjourned in 1978 by Public Law 94-465, which terminated the Commission and transferred its pending docket of 170 cases to the United States Court of Claims on September 30, 1978. It took until the late 1970s to complete most of them, with the last case finished in the early 21st century. By the time of the Commission's final report in 1979, it had awarded $818,172,606.64 in judgments and had completed 546 dockets.

Land was the dominant concern of the litigation by tribes before the Commission. The statutory authority did not permit this tribunal to grant or restore land to the tribes, but only to award money based upon a net acreage figure of lost lands times the monetary market value of an acre at the time of taking. This limitation on the authority of the ICC was resented by many tribal peoples, who wanted the return of their lands more than money—e.g., the Pit River Indians of northern California, and the Teton and Lakota of the Black Hills, South Dakota. In a few instances, by way of settlement acts, tribes gained some monetary funds to buy acreage when they had no communal land (as with the Penobscot and Passamaquoddy of Maine and the Catawba of the Carolinas). Special congressional acts on occasion did restore some acreage, as with the Havasupai at the Grand Canyon.

The methodology and theory of ethnohistorical research in general traces back to the work done by anthropologists and other scholars on claims before the Commission.Anthropologists, ethnologists, historians, and legalists were the dominant researchers and advocates for the plaintiff tribes and the defendant federal government. This expanded the amount of anthropological research on these tribes and led to the foundation of the Ohio Valley Historic Indian Conference, later the American Society for Ethnohistory (ASE). The research and historical reports compiled in evidence for Native American claims was first amassed in 1954 at the inaugural conference. A collection of the studies was published in the series American Indian Ethnohistory by Garland Publishing in 1974.

In preparing expert testimony for litigation brought by the tribes as plaintiffs or for the defense by the U.S. government, researchers explored all forms of data, including the earliest possible maps of original title—i.e., native or indigenous—territory and the cartographic presentations based upon treaties, statutes, and executive orders—generally identified as recognized title. In most cases, recognized title lands could be more easily demonstrated in litigation, while native territory depended upon Indian informants, explorers, trappers, military personnel, missionaries and early field ethnographers. Scholars sought to reconstruct native ecology in terms of food supply and other resources of the environment. In this way, some concept of original territory could be gained that could be mapped. As the Final Report of the ICC revealed, compromises over territorial parcels led to rejecting some acreage which had been used by more than one tribe over time.

The briefs, testimonies, quantum data, findings, and decisions were published in the 1970s in multiple series of microfiche by Clearwater Publishing Co., now owned by LexisNexis. Garland Publishing, NY, also in the 1970s, published some two hundred books containing some but not all of the materials pertaining to the claims cases.

=== Taos Pueblo ===
The return of Blue Lake to the Pueblo of Taos is as the start of the self-determination era in Federal Indian law and was the first success of the 20th century Land Back movement in the United States.

The Pueblo's 48,000 acres (19,000 ha) of mountain land was taken by President Theodore Roosevelt and designated as the Carson National Forest early in the 20th century. It was finally returned in 1970 by the United States when the Republican Richard Nixon signed Democratic senator Fred Harris' Public Law 91-550. An additional 764 acres (309 ha) south of the ridge between Simpson Peak and Old Mike Peak and west of Blue Lake were transferred back to the Pueblo in 1996.

Blue Lake, which the people of the Pueblo consider sacred, was included in this return of Taos land. The Pueblo notably involved non-native people in lobbying the federal government for the return of Blue Lake, as they argued that their unrestricted access to the lake and the surrounding region was necessary to ensure their religious freedom. The Pueblo's web site names the reacquisition of the sacred Blue Lake as the most important event in its history due to the spiritual belief that the Taos people originated from the lake. It is believed that their ancestors live there, and the Pueblos themselves only ascend the mountain for ceremonial purposes. Blue Lake serves as a vital economic foundation for this farming community, providing the main water supply that supports their agricultural activities, including corn cultivation, fruit growing, bean production, and livestock ranching with cattle and sheep.

=== United States v. Sioux Nation of Indians, (1980) ===
United States v. Sioux Nation of Indians, 448 U.S. 371 (1980), was a United States Supreme Court case in which the Court held that: 1) the enactment by Congress of a law allowing the Sioux Nation to pursue a claim against the United States that had been previously adjudicated did not violate the doctrine of separation of powers; and 2) the taking of property that was set aside for the use of the tribe required just compensation, including interest. The Sioux have not accepted the compensation awarded to them by this case, valued at over $1 billion as of 2018.

The Treaty of Fort Laramie (1868) pledged that the Great Sioux Reservation, including the Black Hills, would be "set apart for the absolute and undisturbed use and occupation of the Indians." By the terms of the treaty, cession of any part of the reservation required a new treaty executed and signed by at least three fourths of all the adult male Indians occupying the land. The Sioux's right to hunt in some unceded territories were protected by the Fort Laramie Treaty as well. The Fort Laramie Treaty ended Red Cloud's War, a series of military engagements in which the Sioux tribes, led by chief Red Cloud, fought to protect the integrity of earlier-recognized treaty lands from the incursion of white settlers.

The 1868 treaty brought peace for a few years, but in 1874 an exploratory expedition under General George A. Custer entered the Black Hills to investigate rumors of gold. "Custer's florid descriptions of the mineral and timber resources of the Black Hills, and the land's suitability for grazing and cultivation... received wide circulation, and had the effect of creating an intense popular demand for the 'opening' of the Hills for settlement." Initially the U.S. military tried to turn away trespassing miners and settlers. Eventually, however, President Grant, the Secretary of the Interior, and the Secretary of War "decided that the military should make no further resistance to the occupation of the Black Hills by miners." These orders were to be enforced "quietly" and the President's decision was to remain "confidential".

As more and more settlers and gold miners invaded the Black Hills, the government concluded that the only practical course was to take the land from the Sioux, and appointed a commission to negotiate the purchase. The negotiations failed, and so the US resorted to military force. They used as a pretext to declare the Sioux Indians "hostile" their failure to obey an order to return from an off-reservation hunting expedition in the dead of winter when travel was impossible. The consequent military expedition to remove the Sioux from the Black Hills included an attack on their village on the Little Bighorn River led by Custer. The attack culminated in the victory of Chiefs Sitting Bull and Crazy Horse over the 7th Cavalry Regiment now known as Battle of the Little Bighorn.

That victory was short-lived. Those Indians who survived subsequent battles to surrender to the Army were interned on a reservation and deprived of their weapons and horses, "leaving them completely dependent for survival on rations provided them by the Government." In August 1876, Congress enacted a bill cutting off appropriations "made for the subsistence" of the Sioux unless they ceded the Black Hills to the United States. A commission headed by George Manypenny presented the Sioux with a new treaty and they signed, under threat of starvation. Only a few leaders signed, not the 3/4 majority of all Indian males on the reservation as required under the Fort Laramie Treaty.

After the "Army's withdrawal from its role as enforcer of the Fort Laramie Treaty" the previous year and its subsequent return to prepare for a military campaign against the Sioux, a bill was introduced in the U.S. Senate to authorize "a peaceful settlement" with the Sioux Nation for the Black Hills. A proposed "five-member commission" would have asked the Sioux Nation to relinquish the "entire reservation" given to them under the Fort Laramie Treaty. From most "congressional and pioneer views" this was the "easy and practical method" of securing the Blacks Hills.

S. 590 was approved by the Senate with a vote of thirty to eight, with language that implied that the commission could acquire the entire reservation and relocate the Sioux. In the House Committee on Indian Affairs, it was amended to specify that "nothing in this bill could be construed or twisted to allow for the removal of the Sioux Nation to Indian Territory." Peace efforts or "attempts to purchase the Blacks hills" could still proceed. Missourians praised the action since it would have kept the Sioux far from their borders.

However, after the Battle of the Little Big Horn public opinion turned against the Sioux and Congress refused to address the bill. When asked why, Congressman Omar D. Conger opined that Congress felt the need to "find out whether the Sioux have captured all our army before we go treating with them."

S. 590 went on to die in committee and Congress approved the Indian Appropriations Bill of 1876 instead. It "illegally denied the Sioux all further appropriation and treaty-guaranteed annuities" until they gave up the Black Hills.

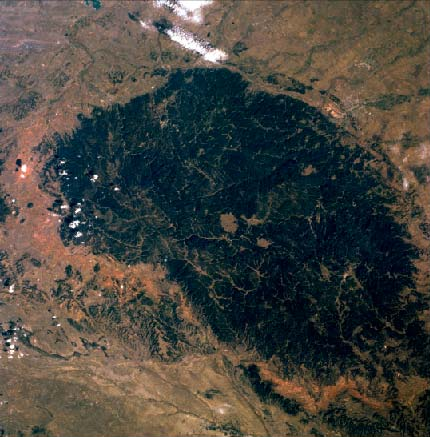
An image of the Black Hills taken from space

The Sioux never accepted the legitimacy of their forced deprivation of their Black Hills reservation. In 1920, lobbyists for the Sioux persuaded Congress to authorize a lawsuit against the United States in US Claims Court. The Sioux filed a petition in 1923, but the Claims Court dismissed the case in 1942, holding that the Court could not second guess whether their compensation under the 1877 Agreement reached by the Manypenny Commission – which served as the basis for the 1877 Act of Congress – was adequate. The Sioux (and many other tribes) continued lobbying Congress for a forum for their claims, and in 1946 Congress created an independent federal agency, the Indian Claims Commission, to "hear and determine all tribal grievances" including the Sioux claim.

The Sioux lost their first hearing before the Indian Claims Commission "due to the failings of their former counsel", but on appeal to the US Claims Court, the Court directed the Commission to take new evidence, which it did in 1958. Then ensued what the US Supreme Court called "a lengthy period of procedural sparring" from 1958 until 1972 – when the Commission ruled in favor of the Sioux, awarding damages for the deprivation of the land, but not interest. On appeal the Government did not contest the Commission's holding that it had "acquired the Black Hills through a course of unfair and dishonorable dealing for which the Sioux were entitled to damages." In effect, the Government was disputing only whether the Sioux could collect 100 years' worth of interest. The Claims Court ruled that its previous 1942 dismissal of the Sioux’s Fifth Amendment Taking case was res judicata (a case already decided), "whether rightly or wrongly", thus denying the opportunity to seek 100 years' worth of interest.

The case returned to the Indian Claims Commission to determine minor leftover issues about the value of rights-of-way and government offsets. In the meantime, in 1978 the Sioux lobbyists persuaded Congress to pass yet another law conferring authority on the Claims Court to hear the Sioux case, this time without regard to res judicata. That meant the Sioux could re-litigate the claim as a Fifth Amendment Taking, to collect 100 years' worth of interest. Finally, under its new authorizing statute, the Claims Court held the Sioux had suffered a Taking cognizable under the Fifth Amendment, and were entitled to the value of the land as of the 1877 taking which was $17.1 million, the value of gold prospectors illegally took out of the land computed at $450,000, and 100 years' worth of interest at 5% per year which would be an additional $88 million.

This Government appealed this decision, and the US Supreme Court granted its petition for certiorari.

Justice Blackmun delivered the Court's opinion in which six other justices joined. Justice White concurred in part, and Justice Rehnquist dissented.

The issue was whether the Sioux had already received just compensation for their land, and the Court affirmed the Claims Court's decision that they never had. The Court recognized a tension between Congress's duty to serve as a benevolent trustee for Indians, and the power to take their land. "Congress can own two hats, but it cannot wear them both at the same time," said the opinion. While reaffirming earlier decisions that Congress has "paramount authority over the property of the Indians," the Court concluded that Congress acts properly only if it "makes a good faith effort to give the Indians the full value of the land," which here it had failed to do. In conclusion the Supreme Court ordered "just compensation to the Sioux Nation, and that obligation, including an award of interest, must now, at last, be paid."

Associate Justice William Rehnquist was the lone dissenter in this case. Rehnquist felt Congress overstepped the bounds of separation of powers by intruding upon the finality of a judicial decision when it "reviewed a prior decision of an Art. III court, eviscerated the finality of that judgment, and ordered a new trial in a pending case." Rehnquist also disagreed that the initial Court of Claims decision in 1942 was wrong. He endorsed the view that the Sioux already had been adequately compensated for their land. Rehnquist's dissent suggests that it is "quite unfair to judge by the light of 'revisionist' historians or the mores of another era actions that were taken under pressure of time more than a century ago."

The Sioux have declined to accept the money, because acceptance would legally terminate Sioux demands for return of the Black Hills. The money remains in a Bureau of Indian Affairs account accruing compound interest. As of 2011, the Sioux's award plus interest was "about $1 billion" or "1.3 billion" (equivalent to $1.43 to $1.86 billion in 2025).

In lieu of accepting the payment outlined by the Court, Sioux leaders created the Black Hills Steering Committee, a political group consisting of members from each Sioux tribe that coalesced around the shared goal of pressuring Congress to enact legislation that would reestablish Sioux sovereignty over the Black Hills territory. Under the leadership of Gerald Clifford, the designated coordinator of legislative efforts, Sioux representatives spent two years negotiating the exact terms of their demands. The final legislative draft written by the Steering Committee called for the creation of a new reservation within the same territory acquired by the United States in 1877 that once constituted the Great Sioux Reservation, and totaled an approximate 7.3 million acres (30000 km^{2}). However, the Sioux would only receive direct title over 1.2 million acres (5000 km^{2}) of federal land, as the State of South Dakota and private residents were permitted to retain ownership over their land. The legislation would also re-establish water and mineral rights to the Sioux in the reapportioned territory and restore tribal jurisdiction. It also included provisions that ensured the exemption of the territory under Sioux control from all federal, local, and state taxes.

The Steering Committee succeeded in bringing this legislation to Congress when Senator Bill Bradley of New Jersey signed on as a sponsor and introduced it on July 17, 1985. The new Sioux Nation Black Hills Act, or "Bradley Bill" as it was more commonly known, was staunchly opposed by the South Dakota delegation. The bill ultimately died in Congress without ever being brought up for a vote.

Bradley tried to reintroduce the legislation in 1987; however, internal political divisions amongst the representatives on the Black Hills Steering Committee diffused the momentum behind it. Steering Committee member Red Cloud proposed that the new legislative effort be led by Phil Stevens, a businessman from California who claimed Sioux ancestry, instead of Clifford. Stevens claimed that the Bradley Bill was not sufficient and demanded, in addition to the restoration of 1.3 million acres (5250 km^{2}) of territory, a sum of $3.1 billion in compensation and the guarantee of future rents on an additional 73 million acres (295 km^{2}) that were included in the original Treaty of 1868 at a value of one dollar per acre to be paid each year. Stevens' proposal earned him widespread support among many Sioux representatives. However, others in the Clifford camp were wary and criticized him for focusing too much on money rather than the return of Sioux land. Senator Bradley decided to hold back on the new bill until a resolution was reached for this internal dispute. Ultimately, Stevens proved unable to secure any congressional support behind his alternative proposal, and the momentum behind the initial push behind the Bradley Bill was lost.

=== Wiyot people ===
The Wiyot people have lived for thousands of years on Duluwat Island, in Humboldt Bay on California's northern coast. In 2004 the Eureka City Council transferred land back to the Wiyot tribe, to add to land the Wiyot had purchased. The council transferred another 60 acres (24 ha) in 2006.

=== Mashpee Wampanoag ===
The Mashpee Wampanoag have lived in Massachusetts and eastern Rhode Island for thousands of years. In 2007, about 300 acres (1.2 km^{2}) of Massachusetts land was put into trust as a reservation for the tribe. Since then, a legal battle has left the tribe's status—and claim to the land—in limbo.

=== Eskasoni First Nation ===
In 2016, Dr. Mohan Singh Virick, a Punjabi Sikh doctor who served Indigenous people in Cape Breton, Nova Scotia, Canada, for 50 years, donated 350 acres (140 ha) of land to Eskasoni First Nation. He also donated a building in Sydney to help house Eskasoni's growing population.

=== Musqueam ===
In October 2018, the city of Vancouver, British Columbia, returned ancient burial site (the Great Marpole Midden) land back to the Musqueam people. The land is home to ancient remains of a Musqueam house site.

=== Wyandotte Nation ===
In 2019, the United Methodist Church gave 3 acres (1.2 ha) of historic land back to the Wyandotte Nation of Oklahoma. The US government in 1819 had promised the tribe 148,000 acres (600 km^{2}) of land in what is now Kansas City, Kansas. When 664 Wyandotte people arrived, the land had been given to someone else.

=== Esselen ===
In July 2020, an organization of self-identified Esselen descendants purchased a 1,200-acre ranch (4.9 km^{2}) near Big Sur, California, as part of a larger $4.5m deal. This acquisition, in historical Esselen lands, aims to protect old-growth forest and wildlife, and the Little Sur River.

=== Tsartlip First Nation ===
Land on the Saanich Peninsula in British Columbia was returned to the Tsartlip First Nation in December 2020.

=== Confederated Salish and Kootenai Tribes ===
Management of the 18,800-acre (76 km^{2}) National Bison Range was transferred from the U.S. Fish and Wildlife Service back to the Confederated Salish and Kootenai Tribes in 2021.

=== Red Cliff Chippewa ===
In August 2022, the Red Cliff Chippewa in northern Wisconsin had 1,500 acres (6.1 km^{2}) of land along the Lake Superior shoreline returned to them from the Bayfield County government. This came after the tribe signed a 2017 memorandum of understanding with the county, acknowledging the Red Cliff Chippewa's desire to see their reservation boundaries restored in full.

=== Tonva ===
In October 2022, a 1-acre site was returned to the Tongva Taraxat Paxaavxa Conservancy by a private resident in Altadena, which marked the first time the Tongva had land in Los Angeles County in 200 years.

=== Hoopa Valley Tribe ===
On December 20, 2023, the Hoopa Valley Tribe acquired 10,395 acres of land bordering the western boundary of the tribe's reservation near Hoopa, California.

=== Haida ===
In 2024, the Government of British Columbia transferred the title of more than 200 islands off Canada's west coast to the Haida people, recognizing the nation's aboriginal land title throughout Haida Gwaii.

=== Sioux ===
On March 15, 2024, Minnesota Governor Tim Walz signed deeds returning the land used as Upper Sioux Agency State Park in southwest Minnesota to the Upper Sioux Community.

=== Keweenaw Bay Indian Community ===
In June 2024, a years-long collaboration in land stewardship between The Nature Conservancy and the Keweenaw Bay Indian Community resulted in the restoration of 760 acres of forested land in Baraga County, Michigan, back into Indigenous hands.

=== Winnebago ===
On July 12, 2024, President Joe Biden signed the Winnebago Land Transfer Act into law, returning about 1,600 acres of land along the Missouri River in Nebraska to the Winnebago Tribe of Nebraska.

=== Grand Traverse Band of Ottowa and Chippewa Indians ===
In late 2024, the Grand Traverse Band of Ottawa and Chippewa Indians received a Transformational Habitat Restoration and Coastal Resilience Grant from NOAA to acquire 187 acres in northern Leelanau County, Michigan, on the coast of Grand Traverse Bay. The site, once and now again known as Mashkiigaki, "the place of medicines," was central to villages established by the Grand Traverse Band's Ojibwe and Odawa predecessors.

=== Confederated Tribes of Siletz Indians ===
In 2025, the Confederated Tribes of Siletz Indians purchased more than 2,000 acres of land near the Table Rocks preserve north of Medford, Oregon.

=== Hassanamisco Nipmuc Band ===
In January 2025, WD Cowls Inc. returned 500 acres of land in Sunderland, Massachusetts to the Hassanamisco Nipmuc Band.

=== Spirit Lake Tribe ===
On February 10, 2025, the US Fish and Wildlife Service returned 680 acres of land in White Horse Hill National Game Preserve in Saint Michael, North Dakota to the Spirit Lake Tribe.

=== Prairie Band Potawatomi Nation ===
On March 21, 2025, Illinois Governor JB Pritzker signed legislation authorizing the transfer of ownership of Shabbona Lake State Park to the Prairie Band Potawatomi Nation.

=== Lyackson First Nation ===
In May 2025, the government of British Columbia returned 312 hectares of land in the Cowichan Valley to the Lyackson First Nation and Cowichan Tribes.

=== Cowichan Tribes ===
In May 2025, the government of British Columbia returned 312 hectares of land in the Cowichan Valley to the Lyackson First Nation and Cowichan Tribes.

=== Yurok ===
In June 2025, the land purchases to create the Blue Creek Salmon Sanctuary and Yurok Tribal Community Forest were completed. Western Rivers Conservancy helped finance the purchases and create the protected area in cooperation with the Yurok Tribe. The land will now be managed by the Yurok Tribe in what is said to be the largest land back conservation deal to date.

=== Alaska Natives NANA Regional Corporation ===
On July 16, 2025, The NANA Regional Corporation, an Alaska Native corporation comprising 11 villages in Northwest Alaska, received nearly 28,000 acres from the Department of the Interior.

=== Iipay Nation of Santa Ysabel ===
In August 2025, the Iipay Nation of Santa Ysabel reacquired 1,107 acres of land in San Felipe Valley, California.

=== Osage Nation ===
On September 22, 2025, Osage Nation reacquired Sugarloaf Mound, the oldest known Native structure in St. Louis, after a 17-year effort.

=== Tule River Indian Tribe ===
On October 29, 2025, the state of California returned 17,030 acres of land to the Tule River Indian Tribe.

=== Lac du Flambeau Band of Lake Superior Chippewa ===
On October 31, 2025, the Franciscan Sisters of Perpetual Adoration returned 2 acres of land in Arbor Vitae, Wisconsin to the Lac du Flambeau Band of Lake Superior Chippewa, marking what officials are calling the first known return of Catholic-owned land to an Indigenous tribe as an act of reparations for Catholic-run American Indian boarding schools.

=== Southern Sierra Miwok Nation ===
In December 2025, the Pacific Forest Trust returned nearly 900 acres of land bordering Yosemite National Park to the Southern Sierra Miwok Nation.

=== Eyak ===
In February 2026, a parcel of land on Sea Otter Island near Cordova, Alaska was transferred to the Eyak Community Land Trust.

=== Eastern Band of Cherokee Indians ===
On February 26, 2026, the Eastern Band of Cherokee Indians officially regained ownership of the Nikwasi Mound after over 200 years, following a vote by the Franklin, North Carolina town council to return the land.

=== Haudenosaunee ===
On March 9, 2026, the Haudenosaunee purchased 600 acres of land in Onchiota, New York from Paul Smith's College.

=== Fond du Lac Band of Lake Superior Chippewa ===
On May 27, 2026, Minnesota Governor Tim Walz signed legislation allowing the University of Minnesota to transfer 3,400 acres (1,400 ha) of land to the Fond du Lac Band of Lake Superior Chippewa.

=== Penobscot Nation ===
On September 17, 2026, the Trust For Public Land purchased 11,000 acres of land near Patten, Maine and returned it to the Penobscot Nation, with the intention of eventually returning 30,000 acres of land.

=== Mashpee Wampanoag ===
On October 30, 2026, The Nature Conservancy transferred 120 acres of land in Eastham, Massachusetts to the Mashpee Wampanoag's Native Land Conservancy.

=== Quinault Indian Nation ===
On November 10, 2026, the Quinault Indian Nation, with assistance from the state of Washington and The Nature Conservancy, bought back 11,196 acres of land in Grays Harbor County, Washington.

=== Eastern Band of Cherokee Indians ===
The Eastern Band of Cherokee Indians (EBCI), (Cherokee: ᏣᎳᎩᏱ ᏕᏣᏓᏂᎸᎩ, Tsalagiyi Detsadanilvgi) is a federally recognized Indian tribe based in western North Carolina in the United States. The history of the Eastern Band closely follows that of the Qualla Boundary, a land trust made up of an area of their original territory. When they reorganized as a tribe, they had to buy back the land from the U.S. government. The EBCI also own, hold, or maintain additional lands in the vicinity, and as far away as 100 miles (160 km) from the Qualla Boundary. The Qualla Boundary is not technically a reservation because the tribe bought the land outright.

== Protest Actions ==
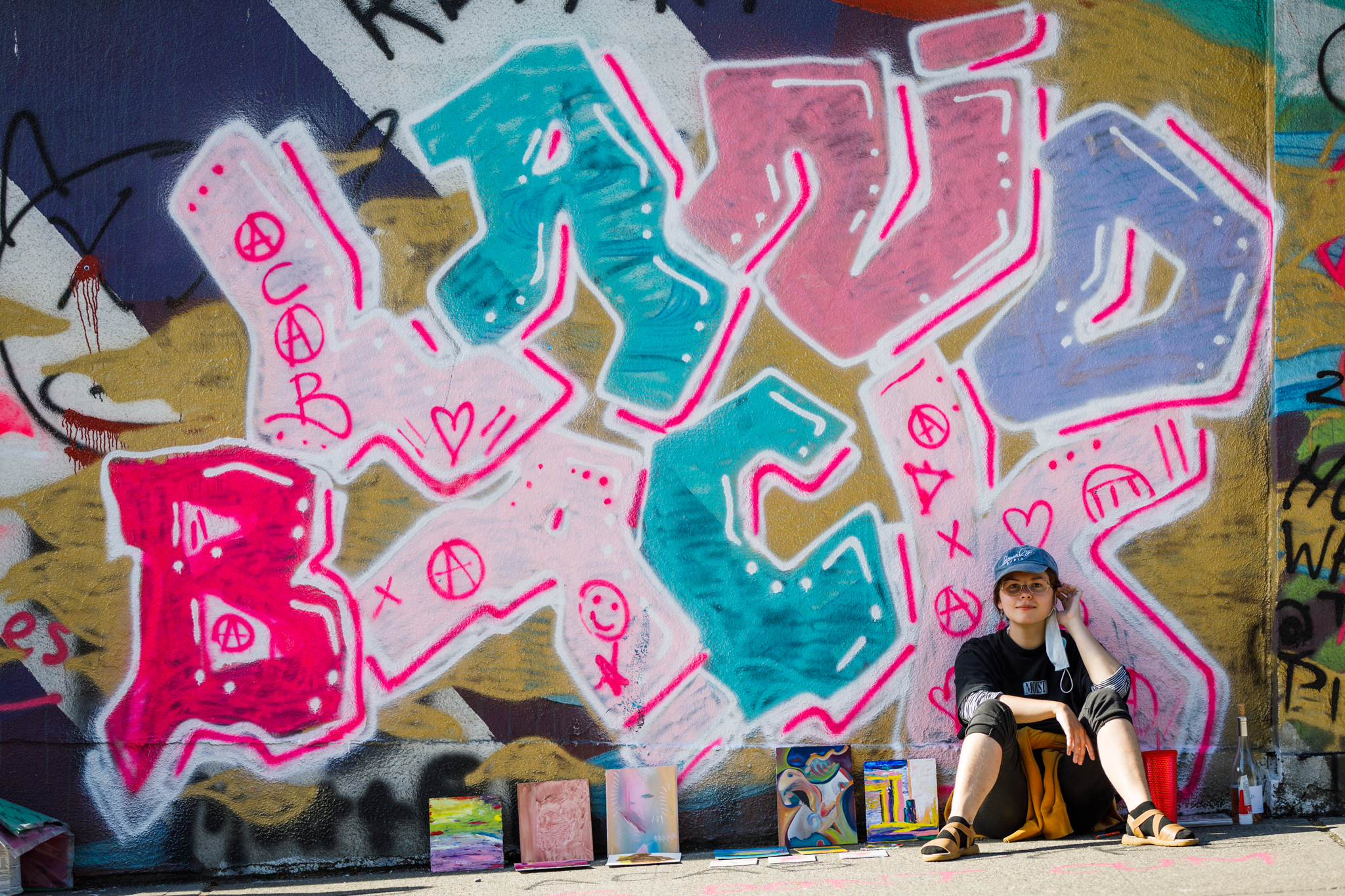
Land back graffiti with anarchist symbology and an unrelated artist in the Capitol Hill Autonomous Zone, 2020

In July 2020, activists from NDN Collective held a protest on a highway leading to Mount Rushmore, where president Donald Trump was to give a campaign speech. The site, known to the Sioux in English as "The Six Grandfathers," is on sacred, unceded land, subject to the Black Hills land claim. These protestors drafted the "Land Back Manifesto", which seeks "the reclamation of everything stolen from the original Peoples". Also in 2020, Haudenosaunee people from the Six Nations of the Grand River blockaded 1492 Land Back Lane to shut down a housing development on their unceded territory.

On July 4, 2021, in Rapid City, South Dakota, a city very close to the Pine Ridge Indian Reservation, four people were arrested after climbing a structure downtown and hanging an upside-down US flag emblazoned with the words "Land Back".

The Black Hills land claim and protests at Mount Rushmore during Donald Trump's 2020 presidential campaign were a catalyzing moment for the movement in the United States.

== See also ==
- Land Buy-Back Program for Tribal Nations
- Indigenous Land Rights (in Australia, in Canada)
- Aboriginal title in the United States
- Republic of Lakotah proposal
- Rematriation
