= COVID-19 pandemic in Oklahoma =

COVID-19 viral pandemic in Oklahoma, United States

- Disease: COVID-19
- Pathogen: SARS-CoV-2
- Location: Oklahoma, U.S.
- First outbreak: Wuhan, Hubei, China
- Index case: Tulsa
- Arrival date: March 8, 2020
- Confirmed cases: 1,018,328
- Active cases: 7,083
- Hospitalized cases: 772 (Current)
- Recovered: 442,741
- Deaths: 14,537

Government website
- coronavirus.health.ok.gov

As of December 22, 2022, Oklahoma has been impacted more by Covid than the average U.S. state. Statistics for the U.S. as a whole are 331 deaths per 100,000 population with 68 percent of the population fully vaccinated. The comparable statistics for Oklahoma are 405 deaths per 100,000 population with 59 percent of the population fully vaccinated. 16,041 deaths from Covid have been recorded in Oklahoma. A wide variation in deaths from Covid exists between counties in Oklahoma. Greer County recorded a death rate of .00753 (753 deaths per 100,000 residents). Payne County recorded a death rate of only .00231 (231 deaths per 100,000 residents.

The first case of COVID-19 in the U.S. state of Oklahoma was reported on March 7, 2020, with the first confirmed COVID-19 death occurring on March 18. For the 7 days ending May 19, 2021, Oklahoma public health authorities reported 965 new cases of COVID-19, for a cumulative total of 451,280 cases since the start of the pandemic. The state's death toll increased to 6,918 with 40 deaths reported over the previous 7 days.

As of May 10, 2023, the last published update, Oklahoma has administered 6,773,461 COVID-19 vaccine doses, equivalent to 61% of the state's population.

== Timeline ==
=== March 2020 ===
On March 7, 2020, the first case of COVID-19 was confirmed in Oklahoma in a patient who had returned from Italy on February 23 and began showing symptoms on February 29.

On March 13, there were 4 cases in Oklahoma, including the first case in Oklahoma City, a woman in her 60s who recently returned from Florida.

On March 15, the number of cases grew to 7, an increase of 75% from March 13. The three new cases were in Cleveland, Payne, and Tulsa counties. The age range of patients was 20 to 69. Governor Stitt held a press conference to announce executive orders.

On March 16, there were 10 cases, an increase of 43% from the previous day. The first case of known community spread was reported on this day. and a few hours later Governor Stitt declared a State of emergency.

On March 17, there were 17 cases. This was an increase of 70% over the previous day.

On March 18, there were 29 cases, an increase of 71% from the previous day's total. In addition, the first COVID-19 patient died of the disease in Tulsa. He was a man in his 50s who had been admitted the day before. Testing capabilities remain limited in Oklahoma.

On March 19, there were 44 cases, an increase of 51% over the previous day.

On March 20, there were 49 cases, an increase of 11%. The majority of the cases were in two counties: Oklahoma (19 cases) and Cleveland (11) Counties.

On March 21, there were 53 cases (an increase of 8%) according to the Oklahoma State Department of Health (OSDH). The U.S. Small Business Administration approved the State of Oklahoma's request for disaster loans for small businesses that are and will be affected by the COVID-19 pandemic.

On March 22, there were 67 cases, an increase of 26% from the day before. In addition, a second patient died. So far, there were no recoveries.

On March 23, there were 81 cases in Oklahoma, an increase of 21% from the previous day. Thirty-six of the 81 cases were in the 18–49 age group, making it the age group with the highest percentage of cases at 44%.

On March 24, the number of cases increased to 106, a jump of 26 additional cases from the day before or 31%. A third person died; she was a woman in her 60s and died in Cleveland County.

On March 25, there were 164 cases of COVID-19 in Oklahoma, an increase of 50 cases in a single day or 55%. The age group with the largest number was 65+ with 55 cases. New counties with cases include Adair, Bryan, Carter, Creek, Delaware, Osage, Pottawatomie and Stephens. In addition, two more people died: a man in his 70s and another in his 40s. Both were from Oklahoma County. The OSDH introduced a testing site in Pittsburgh County with 100 testing kits, and another in Kay County with limited testing supplies.

On March 26, there were 248 cases, an increase of 84 in one day and the highest so far, or an increase of 51%. The Oklahoma State Department of Health reported cases in six more counties: Comanche, Craig, Lincoln, Okmulgee, Ottawa and Sequoyah.

On March 27, there were 322 cases, an increase of 74 or 30%. The death toll climbed to 8 as a male in his 70s in Creek County died. As of this date, there were drive-thru testing sites in four counties: Oklahoma, Tulsa, Kay, and Pittsburg.

On March 28, there were 377 cases, an increase of 55 or 17% more than the day before. There were 7 deaths, bringing the total to 15, an increase of 87%. Six of the victims were over 65 and one was in the 50–64 age group. The virus spread to Le Flore and Nowata counties. The OSDH announced that the University of Oklahoma would have the ability to run 2,800 COVID-19 tests a day.

On March 29, the total number of cases rose to 429, an increase of 14%. There was an additional death: a man aged 50–64 in Oklahoma County, bringing the total number of deaths to 16. The virus also spread to Garfield, Rogers, Seminole and Texas counties.

On March 30, there were 481 confirmed positive cases in Oklahoma, an increase of 12%. Cases had spread to Beckham, Cotton and Love Counties. The death toll rose to 17 with the death of a man in Cleveland County; he was in the 50–64 age group. By the end of the day, the state had received over 60% of its personal protective equipment order from the federal government's Strategic National Stockpile.

On March 31, there were 565 cases of the virus in Oklahoma, an increase of 17%. Six more people died: 4 men older than 65 and a man and a woman in the 50–64 age group, bringing the total number of fatalities to 23. Currently, 31% (565 out of 1,796) of COVID-19 tests are positive. The OSDH reported that the state had ordered millions of dollars of Personal Protective Equipment (PPE) from private suppliers and was expecting larger quantities of PPE, including N95 masks, in the next week.

=== April 2020 ===
On April 1, the number of cases grew to 719, an increase of 27%. Greer County was added to the list of counties with COVID-19 cases. Seven people died of COVID-19: 3 in Oklahoma County and 1 each in Greer, Kay, Mays, and Osage, bringing the death toll to 30. No recoveries have been reported. Thirty-seven percent of tests given have resulted in positive results. There are now enough supplies for 13,000 tests, so the commissioner of health Gary Cox and the governor urged health care providers and testing centers to offer tests to any person with symptoms of COVID-19.

On April 2, there were 879 confirmed cases, an increase of 22%. There were four more deaths: a man in the 36–49 age group and 3 men in the 65-plus age group.

On April 3, the number of cases increased by 12% to 988. Four women over 65 died, bringing the total number of deaths to 38 or 3.8% of cases). There were drive-thru testing sites in 17 counties.

On April 4, cases increased by 17% to 1,159 and the number of deaths to 42. Of the 2,521 Oklahoma residents tested to date, 46% have tested positive. The Oklahoma State Department of Health announced that the Oklahoma Medical Reserve Corps was recruiting both medical and non-medical volunteers.

On April 5, there were 1,251 cases of COVID-19, an increase of 8%, the lowest percentile increase since March 21. Four more people over 65 died, bringing the total number of Oklahoma deaths due to COVID-19 to 46, or 3.7% of positive cases.

On April 6, cases increased to 1,327 and the number of deaths grew to 51. Jefferson County had its first confirmed case, and the first death from the disease in Pottawatomie occurred.

On April 7, cases increased to 1,472 and deaths increased to 67. The first deaths occurred in Adair and Cherokee counties, while the first cases of the virus were confirmed in Beaver, Dewey, and Marshall counties.

On April 8, the number of deaths grew to 79, with 1,524 total cases.

=== June 2020 ===
On June 10, President Donald Trump announced he would hold a rally for his 2020 re-election campaign at the BOK Center in Tulsa on June 19 (later rescheduled to June 20 for sensitivity reasons due to Juneteenth), in his first public campaign event since the pandemic's U.S. activation in March. Concerns were raised that the rally could be a superspreader event; the Trump campaign stated that it would perform temperature checks and offer face masks and hand sanitizer to attendees, while attendees were required to waive the right to hold the Trump campaign liable for any exposure to COVID-19 that may occur at the rally.

On June 14, Oklahoma announced its largest single-day increase in cases, at 225. Tulsa County also reported its largest single-day increase since March.

On June 18, the Oklahoma State Department of Health reported that Oklahoma had reached 9,354 cases, an increase of 450, which broke the previous record day-to-day case increase of 259.

On June 20, 2020, Trump held a poorly attended political rally in Tulsa. Most rally attendees did not wear masks, including Herman Cain, a former presidential candidate and co-chair of Black Voices for Trump. In the aftermath of the rally several COVID-19 cases were reported among campaign staff and Secret Service agents. During the 30 day period immediately before the rally an average of 150 new COVID-19 cases were reported per day in Oklahoma. In the 30 day period after the rally the rate of new COVID-19 cases in Oklahoma more than tripled, to 513 cases per day. The rise was particularly severe in Tulsa County, where local public health officials believe the president's rally caused a spike of cases over the next few weeks. About a week after the rally, Herman Cain was diagnosed with COVID-19 and died from it on July 30.

Trump's June 20 rally hosted was estimated to have been attended by 6,200, in comparison to the arena's capacity of 19,000. Prior to the rally it was announced that six campaign staff members were infected with COVID-19, and in the week following the rally dozens of Secret Service members and campaign staff were forced to quarantine due to COVID-19 infections among their colleagues. On the date of the rally the 7-day moving average of new COVID-19 cases in Oklahoma was 281 cases per day; by July 13 the 7-day moving average had more than doubled, to 626 new cases per day.

=== July 2020 ===
On July 15, Governor Stitt became the first US state governor to test positive for COVID-19. Despite Governor Stitt not wearing a mask while attending Trump's rally in Tulsa, Oklahoma Commissioner of Health Colonel Lance Frye said the rally was too long ago for it to be the cause of the infection and that it was unknown where the governor was infected.

The Oklahoma State Medical Association announced that 1,600 healthcare workers in the state were infected with COVID-19 since the month of February resulting in 6 deaths among the 1,600.

In the 30 day period after the Trump campaign rally the rate of new COVID-19 cases in Oklahoma more than tripled, to 513 cases per day. Rally attendee Herman Cain died of COVID-19 on July 30.

=== August 2020 ===
On August 6, Governor Stitt announced that he had contracted COVID-19 after hugging some friends who were visiting from Tulsa.

By mid-August, the mask mandate in Oklahoma City had been in place over a month, and the seven-day averages in Oklahoma County had fallen "from 213 daily infections in mid-July to 136 daily infections by mid-August." According to Dr. David Kendrick, studies showed "the positivity rates are declining in cities that have a [masking] policy compared to the ones who don't." He added that "data showed huge spikes in infections following many gatherings, including a large bump in infection rates for 18-35 year-olds following Memorial Day."

On August 12, 4 staff members at Mid-Del Schools in Midwest City tested positive.

On August 13, 2020, students at Luther Public School District tested positive.

On August 14, 23 sorority sisters tested positive at Oklahoma State University--Stillwater, and their chapter house was quarantined. Konawa Public Schools sent students home at noon when a student tested positive.

On August 19, Coyle Public Schools switched to virtual learning after the district's superintendent tested positive.

On August 20, Oklahoma had a 7.9% infection rate, which had dropped from high of 13.5% in late July, but remained above the national average.

On August 21, 1,077 new cases were reported by the Oklahoma State Department of Health, and 6 new deaths. A total of 129 residents had tested positive at the Claremore Veterans Center, with 36 deaths since July 1. Two students and two teachers had tested positive at Grove Public Schools in Tulsa. A spokesperson for the Mayor of Tulsa said she was surprised to hear that the August 16 White House Coronavirus Task Force State Report for Oklahoma had not been shared with the city. Mayor Bynum said he was surprised to hear from Deborah Birx that "there had been eight or so of the weekly COVID-19 reports." Little Axe Public School District announced it would "move to virtual learning after several staff members began showing signs of COVID-19." An Edmond Public Schools student was quarantined after a teacher tested positive for COVID-19.

On August 22, 853 cases were reported by the Oklahoma State Department of Health, and 10 new deaths. Over 35 percent of the new cases were in people aged 18–35, and over 50% of were in people under 50.

=== October 2020 ===
The Oklahoma State Department of Health reported 1,006 new cases on October 7, a 1.1 percent increase over the previous day.

=== January 2021 ===
January 10, 2021 marked 6,487 COVID-19 cases and along with January 27's 65 deaths set new single day records for Oklahoma, a striking surge observed in many other US states over the fall and winter.

=== May 2021 ===
An outbreak of delta-variant COVID-19 at an indoor gymnastics facility resulted in 47 cases, 40 of which were unvaccinated.

== Response ==
=== March 2020 ===
On March 16, the OSDH authorized facilities such as hospitals, long-term care facilities, and detention centers to restrict visitation by the public. On March 24, Governor Stitt announced a "Safer at Home" executive order effective through April 30, requiring vulnerable populations (including those over the age of 65 or with underlying health conditions) to remain at their residences unless conducting essential shopping, medical appointments, or exercise. Effective March 25, gatherings of more than 10 people were prohibited. In the 19 counties that had a confirmed case, "non-essential" businesses that involve social gatherings or close contact (such as bars, dine-in restaurants, gyms, and personal care facilities) were ordered to close for 21 days. This order would also be applied to any other county that had new positive cases going forward. On March 25, the state board of education voted to close all public schools until the end of the school year.

On March 31, the business closures were extended through April 30, and became effective state-wide on April 1. Stitt encouraged residents to support local restaurants, which would still be allowed to offer take-out services. Stitt also encouraged medical officials to increase their testing of those with any symptoms or had been recently in contact with someone who had tested positive.

=== April 2020 ===
The Center for Reproductive Rights and Planned Parenthood sued the state over including non-emergency abortions in its suspension of elective procedures at hospitals. On April 6, District Judge Charles Goodwin issued a restraining order requiring the state to resume offering abortions, as restricting them would cause "irreparable harm" to women. On April 15, the Safer at Home order was extended through May 6, with Stitt stating that elective surgeries could resume on April 24.

On April 23, Governor Kevin Stitt announced that phase 1 of the reopening of business would begin April 24, including personal care facilities, state parks, outdoor recreation, and that dine-in restaurants (excluding bars), cinemas, gyms, sports venues, and places of worship could reopen on May 1, subject to social distancing and other sanitation protocols and guidelines per-industry. Phase 2 began May 15, including reopening of bars at limited capacity, funerals and weddings, and organized sports, subject to social distancing. Phase 3 began June 1, including businesses that had been restricted to appointments only, summer camps, and limited visitation at hospitals, and for long-term care facilities in end-of-life situations. Guidance regarding social distancing and the Safer at Home guidelines for vulnerable residents remain in force.

=== May 2020 ===
The Choctaw Nation in Southeastern Oklahoma received financial aid from the people and government of the Republic of Ireland to pay back the tribe for their donation of food to the Irish people during the Great Famine of Ireland in 1850, which was 170 years ago.

=== August 2020 ===
An August 12 Tulsa World editorial stated, "Last week our number of confirmed cases are up 991% from May 1, when the state's reopening began. Deaths are up 55%. Hospitalizations are up 123%. That's not the result of more testing. It's the result of more disease."

On August 14, Dr. Deborah Birx led a roundtable discussion at the Oklahoma State University Center for Health Sciences in Tulsa. She was described as "unwavering on the necessity for masks and distancing in public."

On August 21, a spokesperson for the Mayor of Tulsa said she was surprised to hear that the August 16 White House Coronavirus Task Force State Report for Oklahoma had not been shared with the city. Mayor Bynum said he was surprised to hear from Deborah Birx that "there had been eight or so of the weekly COVID-19 reports." A Coronavirus testing plan was announced for Oklahoma teachers.

On August 22, Governor Stitt indicated that he would begin releasing the White House Coronavirus Task Force reports on Oklahoma. The reports, which call for mask mandates and bar closures, indicate that Oklahoma remains "one of nine states in the "red zone" for coronavirus infections because of more than 100 COVID-19 cases per 100,000 people." Regional metro areas in the red zone included Tulsa, Enid, McAlester, Fort Smith, Miami and Guymon. The eighteen counties in the red zone were: Tulsa, Caddo, Choctaw, Coal, Creek, Garfield, Kingfisher, Mayes, McCurtain, McIntosh, Osage, Ottawa, Pawnee, Pittsburg, Rogers, Sequoyah, Texas, and Wagoner.

=== September 2020 ===
On September 1, Governor Stitt urged Oklahomans to wash their hands, practice social distancing, and wearing a mask in public. The Governor however, stated he would not issue a statewide mask mandate and continue to let that decision be made on the local level.

=== December 2020 ===
As Oklahoma ranked 12th in the country for new cases per capita, Governor Stitt created a 30-second tourism advertisement. Oklahoma had no travel restrictions in place.

=== Travel restrictions ===
On March 28, a state executive order was amended to require 14 days of self-isolation for anyone traveling to Oklahoma by air from six states that had a large number of cases, including California, Connecticut, Louisiana, New Jersey, New York, and Washington.

== Statistics ==
COVID-19 pandemic medical cases in Oklahoma by county
County (Note: County where individuals with a positive case reside. Location of diagnosis and treatment may vary.)	Cases (Note: Reported confirmed cases. Actual case numbers are probably higher.) (Note: Includes 152 cases from unknown counties.)	Deaths (Note: Includes 7,373 deaths from unknown counties.)	Population (Note: July 2019 population estimate from "U.S. Census Bureau Quick Facts: Oklahoma". United States Census Bureau.)	Cases / 100k
77 / 77	1,306,350	18,252	3,956,971	33,013.9
Adair	9,983	62	22,194	44,980.6
Alfalfa	1,896	9	5,702	33,251.5
Atoka	4,773	35	13,758	34,692.5
Beaver	1,200	9	5,311	22,594.6
Beckham	7,345	75	21,859	33,601.7
Blaine	2,971	30	9,429	31,509.2
Bryan	17,609	108	47,995	36,689.2
Caddo	10,348	132	28,762	35,978.0
Canadian	48,889	295	148,306	32,965.0
Carter	19,657	193	48,111	40,857.6
Cherokee	17,812	118	48,657	36,607.3
Choctaw	5,113	51	14,672	34,848.7
Cimarron	720	2	2,137	33,692.1
Cleveland	101,912	609	284,014	35,882.7
Coal	2,154	20	5,495	39,199.3
Comanche	39,666	311	120,749	32,850.0
Cotton	1,705	23	5,666	30,091.8
Craig	6,101	33	14,142	43,141.0
Creek	23,136	263	71,522	32,348.1
Custer	9,867	129	29,003	34,020.6
Delaware	13,936	161	43,009	32,402.5
Dewey	1,254	19	4,891	25,638.9
Ellis	1,048	6	3,859	27,157.3
Garfield	18,276	212	61,056	29,933.2
Garvin	8,812	100	27,711	31,799.6
Grady	17,386	185	55,834	31,138.7
Grant	1,264	8	4,333	29,171.5
Greer	1,615	25	5,712	28,273.8
Harmon	917	7	2,653	34,564.6
Harper	844	10	3,688	22,885.0
Haskell	3,418	29	12,627	27,069.0
Hughes	3,150	44	13,279	23,721.7
Jackson	8,342	86	24,530	34,007.3
Jefferson	1,611	20	6,002	26,841.1
Johnston	3,974	47	11,085	35,850.2
Kay	15,903	166	43,538	36,526.7
Kingfisher	4,891	54	15,765	31,024.4
Kiowa	2,440	41	8,708	28,020.2
Latimer	2,754	23	10,073	27,340.4
Le Flore	15,726	89	49,853	31,544.7
Lincoln	10,140	112	34,877	29,073.6
Logan	13,782	115	48,011	28,705.9
Love	4,011	29	10,253	39,120.3
Major	2,577	32	7,629	33,779.0
Marshall	5,772	28	16,931	34,091.3
Mayes	13,515	126	41,100	32,883.2
McClain	15,012	106	40,474	37,090.5
McCurtain	9,846	129	32,832	29,989.0
McIntosh	5,597	94	19,596	28,562.0
Murray	5,396	53	14,073	38,342.9
Muskogee	24,775	262	67,997	36,435.4
Noble	3,658	30	11,131	32,863.2
Nowata	3,270	29	10,076	32,453.4
Okfuskee	4,281	47	11,993	35,695.8
Oklahoma	247,602	1,887	797,434	31,049.8
Okmulgee	11,872	141	38,465	30,864.4
Osage	14,108	127	46,963	30,040.7
Ottawa	11,810	101	31,127	37,941.3
Pawnee	5,144	66	16,376	31,411.8
Payne	23,679	117	81,784	28,953.1
Pittsburg	14,096	158	43,654	32,290.3
Pontotoc	17,104	101	38,284	44,676.6
Pottawatomie	27,319	195	72,592	37,633.6
Pushmataha	3,316	40	11,096	29,884.6
Roger Mills	1,133	12	3,583	31,621.5
Rogers	32,095	293	92,459	34,712.7
Seminole	7,909	105	24,258	32,603.7
Sequoyah	13,103	89	41,569	31,521.1
Stephens	13,602	144	43,143	31,527.7
Texas	7,066	39	19,983	35,360.1
Tillman	1,844	24	7,250	25,434.5
Tulsa	215,637	1,694	651,552	33,095.9
Wagoner	27,386	207	81,289	33,689.7
Washington	15,972	200	51,527	30,997.3
Washita	3,371	31	10,916	30,881.3
Woods	2,759	26	8,793	31,377.2
Woodward	6,221	51	20,211	30,780.3
Final update May 4, 2023, with data through the previous day Data is publicly reported by Oklahoma State Department of Health

==== Lethality by sex, age, race and ethnicity ====
Confirmed COVID-19 cases in Oklahoma by sex, age, race and ethnicity
Classification		Cases		Deaths		Lethality (%)
Classification		Number	(%)	Number	(%)	Lethality (%)
All		51,746	(100.0)	715	(100.0)	(1.382)
Sex	Male	24,579	(47.5)	391	(54.7)	(1.591)
Sex	Female	27,167	(52.5)	324	(45.3)	(1.193)
Age	65+	7,191	(0.139)	564	(0.789)	(7.843)
Age	50-64	9320	(0.180)	121	(0.169)	(1.298)
Age	36-49	11,314	(0.218)	20	(0.028)	(0.177)
Age	18-35	18,120	(0.350)	9	(0.013)	(0.050)
Age	5-17	4,639	(0.091)	1	(0.001)	(0.022)
Age	0-4	1,162	(0.022)	0	(0.000)	(0.000)
Race/ ethnicity	American Indian/Alaska Native only	4,812	(9.3)	65	(9.1)	(1.351)
Race/ ethnicity	Asian or Pacific Islander only	2,018	(3.9)	16	(2.2)	(0.793)
Race/ ethnicity	Black only	3,673	(7.1)	44	(6.2)	(1.198)
Race/ ethnicity	White only	28,408	(54.9)	522	(73.0)	(1.838)
Race/ ethnicity	Other & multiple races	2,069	(4.0)	25	(3.5)	(1.208)
Race/ ethnicity	Hispanic or Latino (can be any race)	10,193	(19.7)	45	(6.4)	(0.441)
Race/ ethnicity	Did not report race	10,814	(20.9)	43	(6.0)	(0.398)
Race/ ethnicity	Did not report ethnicity	11,746	(22.7)	76	(10.6)	(0.647)
Source: Oklahoma Executive Order Report, from 2020/07/31., 2020/08/21

== Impact ==
=== Sports ===
The National Basketball Association suspended its 2019–20 season on March 11 after Utah Jazz player Rudy Gobert tested positive for COVID-19 prior to a game against the Oklahoma City Thunder at Chesapeake Energy Arena in Oklahoma City.

The Oklahoma Secondary School Activities Association (OSSAA) postponed its high school basketball tournaments, and all other spring semester sports activities.

=== Fairs ===
On June 26, the Oklahoma State Fair was canceled. On August 11, The Tulsa State Fair was canceled.

== See also ==
- Timeline of the COVID-19 pandemic in the United States
- COVID-19 pandemic in the United States – for impact on the country
- COVID-19 pandemic – for impact on other countries
