= 2020 Salute to America =

2020 event arranged by the Trump administration

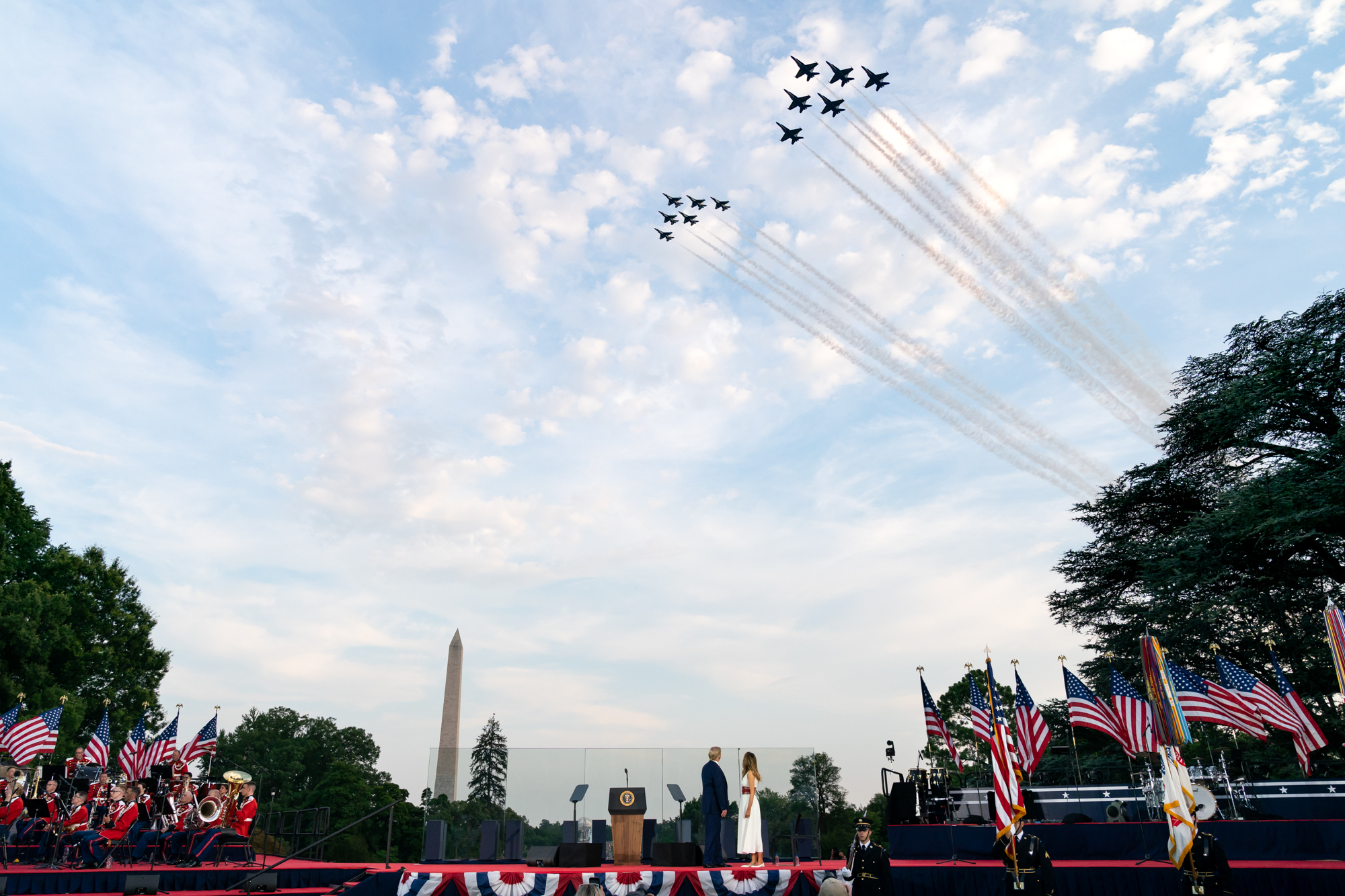
- The United States Air Force Thunderbirds and the United States Navy Blue Angels conduct a flyover over the White House during the Salute to America event
- Date: July 4, 2020
- Venue: White House South Lawn and National Mall
- Location: Washington, D.C., United States; 38°53′21.4″N 77°3′0.5″W
- Organised by: Donald Trump

The 2020 Salute to America was an event with flyovers and fireworks arranged by the Trump administration held on Independence Day, July 4, 2020. It was the second event of its kind; the first was held a year prior, in 2019. The 2020 event was especially notable for being held amid the ongoing COVID-19 pandemic and for not requiring masks or social distancing, despite recommendations to do so from the Centers for Disease Control and Prevention and other health officials due to the pandemic. Although masks were handed out free of charge, few of those who attended wore one.

Ten lawmakers had asked President Trump to cancel the event prior to its being held.

It took place primarily at the National Mall, with Trump giving remarks at the South Lawn of the White House at the start of the event.

The fireworks display was created by Fireworks by Grucci.

== See also ==
- 2020 Mount Rushmore Fireworks Celebration (an event held the night before Salute to America)
- COVID-19 pandemic in Washington, D.C.
- National Garden of American Heroes
- United States Semiquincentennial
