= National Garden of American Heroes =

Proposed garden in Washington, D.C.

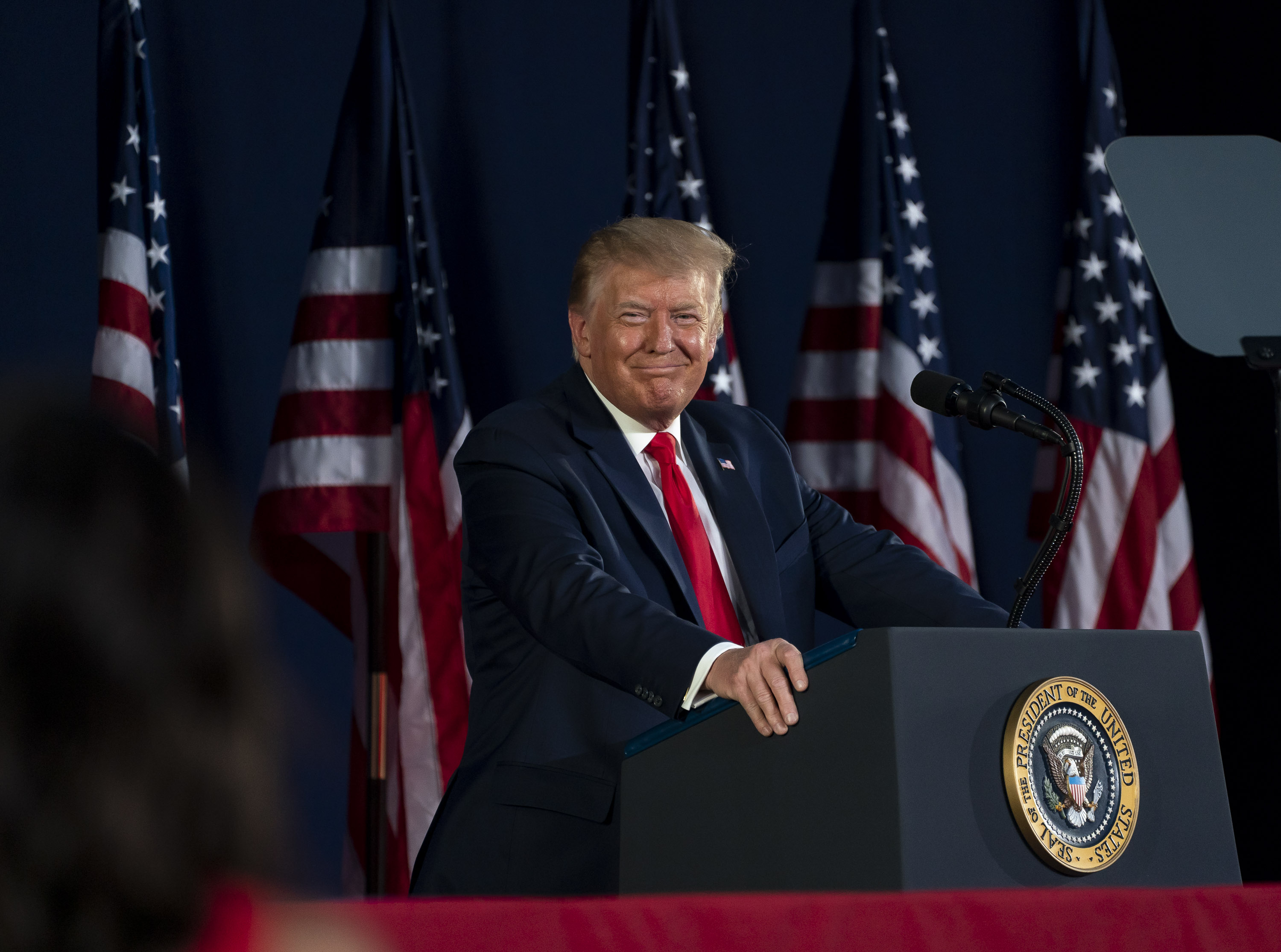
Trump announcing the garden proposal at the Mount Rushmore Fireworks Celebration on July 3, 2020

The National Garden of American Heroes is a proposed sculpture garden honoring "great figures of America's history". The concept was first put forward by President Donald Trump in 2020 during an Independence Day event in Keystone, South Dakota. It was included in a series of executive orders issued by Trump in the final months of his first term in office that sought to address conservative cultural grievances. In July 2025, Congress passed the One Big Beautiful Bill Act, which appropriates $40 million to establish and maintain the National Garden of American Heroes.

Trump's vision for the garden includes the creation of 250 statues depicting notable Founding Fathers, activists, political figures, businesspeople, athletes, celebrities, and pop culture icons. Initial reactions from historians were largely negative, with many criticizing the choices as seemingly random and political. Reactions by sculptors were also negative, with many describing the requested criteria for the statues as unrealistic and unworkable given the money and timetable expected.

== History ==
Trump's order said that the proposed garden would be managed by the Task Force for Building and Rebuilding Monuments to American Heroes, which would allocate funding from the Interior Department to establish the site. Members of the task force would include chairs of the National Endowment for the Arts and National Endowment for the Humanities, the Administrator of General Services, the chair of the Advisory Council on Historic Preservation, and any additional "officers or employees of any executive department or agency" designated by the president. Trump described the garden as a response to the practice of removing monuments and memorials; many such monuments were removed or destroyed in 2020 as part of a response to the George Floyd protests. In his Mount Rushmore speech announcing the proposal, Trump claimed that "Angry mobs are trying to tear down statues of our founders, deface our most sacred memorials and unleash a wave of violent crime in our cities" and pledged to build "a vast outdoor park that will feature the statues of the greatest Americans to ever live".

Under Trump's Executive Order 13934, issued July 3, 2020, the task force was granted 60 days to develop preliminary plans for the site, including a potential location, and was to open before July 4, 2026, the 250th anniversary of the adoption of the Declaration of Independence. The original executive order listed 31 historical figures as examples of those who would receive a statue in the Garden. On January 18, 2021—two days before leaving office—Trump signed a new executive order listing 244 historical figures, including all 31 previously named, of those who would receive statues. That revised list included 192 men and 52 women.

In 2021, the garden was considered highly unlikely to ever be built, and Congress never appropriated any funds for the project. On May 14, 2021, President Joe Biden issued an executive order that revoked both of Trump's executive orders on the Garden, as well as various other Trump-issued executive orders.

On January 29, 2025, Trump revoked Biden's executive order related to the garden and called for six additional names to be added to the list of historical figures. The timeline of its construction was modified from July 4, 2026, to "as expeditiously as possible". During a 2025 Black History Month reception at the White House, Trump said a statue of Prince Estabrook, a Black Patriot, would be in the garden. Vince Haley, chair of the Domestic Policy Council, would be responsible for selecting the final list of 250 subjects.

In March 2025 South Dakota Governor Larry Rhoden sent Trump a proposal to build the garden in the Black Hills region in the state near Mount Rushmore on a plot of private land that will be donated.

In April 2025, the National Endowment for the Humanities announced it would sponsor grants to artists for the planned works, in a joint effort with the National Endowment for the Arts.

On June 24, 2026, at a rally in the National Mall to kick off the Great American State Fair, Donald Trump announced the garden will be built in West Potomac Park.

=== Funding and legislative authorization ===
In April 2025, the National Endowment for the Humanities announced a grant program of $200,000 per statue paid for in part by canceled grants for other arts and humanities projects by Elon Musk's Department of Government Efficiency. It directed that statues were portrayed in a "realistic manner," with no modernist or abstract designs allowed. The Executive Order mandated further that the work must be "in the classical style, lifelike, and created from marble, granite, bronze, copper, or brass,".

In May 2025, the U.S. House of Representatives passed the One Big Beautiful Bill Act, a comprehensive budget reconciliation package. Section 86001 of the bill appropriates $40 million to the Department of the Interior to establish and maintain the National Garden of American Heroes.

The bill's passage marked the first congressional funding for the garden, which had previously been authorized solely through executive orders during President Trump's first term.

== Reception ==
=== Initial reception by historians ===
In 2020, James R. Grossman, the executive director of the American Historical Association, said that "The choices vary from odd to probably inappropriate to provocative" and suggested that the proposal was an attempt by Trump "to seize on a cultural conflict to distract from other issues" during an election season, as suggested by the short (60-day) timetable that Trump set forth in his order. Historian Karen Cox described the executive order about the proposed monument as "random" and said that "Nothing about this suggests it's thoughtful". Historian Adam Domby noted that the initial proposal did not include Native Americans, although Red Cloud, Chief Joseph, Sacagawea, Chief Sitting Bull, Tecumseh, and Jim Thorpe have since been selected. Domby also noted that the initial proposal included General George Patton but omitted President Dwight D. Eisenhower, although both generals were later slated for inclusion as are other historical military figures. Several of the chosen statues were criticized for their stances on race, and criticism was made that the garden featured more conservative intellectuals than left-leaning ones.

=== Initial reception by sculptors ===
In 2025, Politico reported that sculptors who saw the design specifications for Trump's garden described it as unrealistic, and that "America doesn't have enough quality sculptors or museum-caliber foundries to make this happen on Trump's speedy timeline". Daniel Kunitz, editor of Sculpture magazine, called the proposal "completely unworkable". The report stated that most fine-arts foundries in the United States are booked six to 18 months in advance, and that sculpture experts mused the only place that could create the desired sculptures on the timetable requested was in China. It further quoted fine arts experts who stated that such collaborations ran the risk of having work be "slapdash and uninspired", and quoted one sculpture expert who likened the attempt to "a government-run version of Madame Tussaud's wax museum". The report questioned who would apply for the $200,000 commission, noting both low opinion of Trump in the artistic community and noting that the money offered was low after the costs of base casting and material were applied, which were requested to be granite, bronze, copper, or brass.

== Proposed statues ==
Names marked with an asterisk (*) were included in the original executive order.

- Ansel Adams
- John Adams*
- Samuel Adams
- Muhammad Ali
- Luis Walter Alvarez
- Susan B. Anthony*
- Hannah Arendt
- Louis Armstrong
- Neil Armstrong
- Crispus Attucks
- John James Audubon
- Lauren Bacall
- Clara Barton*
- Todd Beamer
- Alexander Graham Bell
- Roy Benavidez
- Ingrid Bergman
- Irving Berlin
- Humphrey Bogart
- Daniel Boone*
- Norman Borlaug
- William Bradford
- Herb Brooks
- Kobe Bryant
- William F. Buckley Jr.
- Sitting Bull
- Frank Capra
- Andrew Carnegie
- Charles Carroll
- John Carroll
- George Washington Carver
- Johnny Cash
- Joseph H. De Castro
- Joshua Chamberlain*
- Whittaker Chambers
- Johnny "Appleseed" Chapman
- Ray Charles
- Julia Child
- Gordon Chung-Hoon
- William Clark
- Henry Clay*
- Roberto Clemente
- Grover Cleveland
- Red Cloud
- William F. "Buffalo Bill" Cody
- Nat King Cole
- Samuel Colt
- Christopher Columbus
- Calvin Coolidge
- James Fenimore Cooper
- Davy Crockett*
- Benjamin O. Davis Jr.
- Miles Davis
- Dorothy Day
- Emily Dickinson
- Walt Disney
- William J. Donovan
- Jimmy Doolittle
- Desmond Doss
- Frederick Douglass*
- Herbert Henry Dow
- Katharine Drexel
- Peter Drucker
- Amelia Earhart*
- Thomas Edison
- Jonathan Edwards
- Albert Einstein
- Dwight D. Eisenhower
- Duke Ellington
- Ralph Waldo Emerson
- Prince Estabrook
- Medgar Evers
- David Farragut
- Mary Fields
- Henry Ford
- George L. Fox
- Aretha Franklin
- Benjamin Franklin*
- Milton Friedman
- Robert Frost
- Gabby Gabreski
- Bernardo de Gálvez
- Lou Gehrig
- Theodor Seuss Geisel
- Cass Gilbert
- Ruth Bader Ginsburg
- John Glenn
- Barry Goldwater
- Samuel Gompers
- Alexander D. Goode
- R. C. Gorman
- Billy Graham*
- Ulysses S. Grant
- Nellie Gray
- Nathanael Greene
- Woody Guthrie
- Nathan Hale
- William Halsey Jr.
- Alexander Hamilton*
- Ira Hayes
- Hans Christian Heg
- Ernest Hemingway
- Patrick Henry
- Charlton Heston
- Alfred Hitchcock
- Billie Holiday
- Bob Hope
- Johns Hopkins
- Grace Hopper
- Sam Houston
- Whitney Houston
- Julia Ward Howe
- Edwin Hubble
- Daniel Inouye
- Andrew Jackson
- Robert H. Jackson
- Mary Jackson
- John Jay
- Thomas Jefferson*
- Steve Jobs
- Katherine Johnson
- Barbara Jordan
- Chief Joseph
- Elia Kazan
- Helen Keller
- John F. Kennedy
- Francis Scott Key
- Martin Luther King Jr.*
- Coretta Scott King
- Russell Kirk
- Jeane Kirkpatrick
- Henry Knox
- Tadeusz Kościuszko
- Lafayette
- Harper Lee
- Pierre Charles L'Enfant
- Meriwether Lewis
- Abraham Lincoln*
- Vince Lombardi
- Henry Wadsworth Longfellow
- Clare Boothe Luce
- Douglas MacArthur*
- Dolley Madison*
- James Madison*
- George C. Marshall
- Thurgood Marshall
- William Mayo
- Christa McAuliffe*
- William McKinley
- Louise McManus
- Herman Melville
- Thomas Merton
- Billy Mitchell
- George P. Mitchell
- Maria Mitchell
- Samuel Morse
- Lucretia Mott
- John Muir
- Audie Murphy*
- Edward R. Murrow
- John Neumann
- John von Neumann
- Annie Oakley
- Jesse Owens
- Rosa Parks
- George S. Patton Jr.*
- Charles Willson Peale
- William Penn
- Oliver Hazard Perry
- John J. Pershing
- Edgar Allan Poe
- Clark V. Poling
- John Russell Pope
- Elvis Presley*
- Jeannette Rankin
- Ronald Reagan*
- Walter Reed
- William Rehnquist
- Paul Revere
- Henry Hobson Richardson
- Hyman G. Rickover
- Sally Ride
- Matthew Ridgway
- Jackie Robinson*
- Norman Rockwell
- Caesar Rodney
- Eleanor Roosevelt
- Franklin D. Roosevelt
- Theodore Roosevelt
- Betsy Ross*
- Babe Ruth
- Sacagawea
- Jonas Salk
- John Singer Sargent
- Antonin Scalia*
- Norman Schwarzkopf Jr.
- Junípero Serra
- Elizabeth Ann Seton
- Robert Gould Shaw
- Fulton J. Sheen
- Alan Shepard
- Frank Sinatra
- Bessie Smith
- Margaret Chase Smith
- Elizabeth Cady Stanton
- James Stewart
- Harriet Beecher Stowe*
- Gilbert Stuart
- Anne Sullivan
- William Howard Taft
- Maria Tallchief
- Maxwell D. Taylor
- Tecumseh
- Kateri Tekakwitha
- Shirley Temple
- Nikola Tesla
- Jefferson Thomas
- Henry David Thoreau
- Jim Thorpe
- Augustus Tolton
- Alex Trebek
- Harry S. Truman
- Sojourner Truth
- Harriet Tubman*
- Mark Twain
- Dorothy Vaughan
- C. T. Vivian
- Thomas Ustick Walter
- Sam Walton
- John P. Washington
- Booker T. Washington*
- George Washington*
- John Wayne
- Ida B. Wells-Barnett
- Phillis Wheatley
- Walt Whitman
- Laura Ingalls Wilder
- Roger Williams
- John Winthrop
- Frank Lloyd Wright
- Orville Wright*
- Wilbur Wright*
- Alvin York
- Cy Young
- Lorenzo de Zavala

== See also ==
- 1776 Commission
- Hall of Fame for Great Americans
- National Statuary Hall Collection
