= NDN Collective =

Advocacy organisation in the US

NDN Collective is an Indigenous-led activist and advocacy organization based in Rapid City, South Dakota, United States. Founded in 2018, NDN Collective works with more than 200 Indigenous-led groups in the U.S.

NDN Collective's mission is "Build the collective power of Indigenous Peoples, communities, and Nations to exercise our inherent right to self-determination, while fostering a world that is built on a foundation of justice and equity for all people and the planet." and includes "defend: our people, communities, and nations; develop: Indigenous communities in a regenerative and sustainable manner, and decolonize: our minds, communities, and sovereign nations."

According to president and CEO Nick Tilsen (Oglala Lakota), NDN Collective has "an overall strategy to shift power, decolonize wealth, and resource Indigenous people who are on the front lines of fighting for justice and equity." NDN is operated entirely by Indigenous leadership, board, and staff that come from over 25 Tribal Nations. "NDN" is internet shorthand for "Indian."

== Campaigns ==
The collective has four primary campaign areas:

- Climate justice
- Racial equity
- Education equity
- LANDBACK

The collective created its LANDBACK Campaign to support the global indigenous Land Back movement. The movement demands the return of Native American territory seized by breaking treaties, including return of Lakota territory in the Black Hills of South Dakota, where the four faces of Mount Rushmore are carved. “Wherever you go to connect to God, that’s what the Black Hills are to the Lakota,” said Nick Tilsen, president of NDN Collective. The area, known as Paha Sapa — “the heart of everything that is” is sacred to the Lakota people.

== Actions ==
In 2019, NDN Collective were active in protesting against the Keystone Pipeline.

On July 3, 2020, Tilsen helped organize more than 200 people to attend a protest against the South Dakota's Mount Rushmore Fireworks Celebration 2020. Activists called for the monument to be removed, and for "a share in the economic benefits from the region". Tilsen was arrested during the protest and charged with a combination of misdemeanors and felonies that could have led to 17 years in prison. Most charges were later dropped.

On July 4, 2021, four NDN Collective protestors were arrested after scaling a 100-foot-tall grain elevator in downtown Rapid City and hanging a gigantic, inverted American flag with the words "Land Back".

As of 2021, an NDN Collective member advised the Biden administration as part of the White House Environmental Justice Advisory Council, "issuing recommendations to end nuclear power, carbon capture technologies, highway expansions".

NDN Collective called for clemency for Native American activist Leonard Peltier and aided in his legal effort. On September 12, 2023, NDN Collective protested outside the White House, calling for clemency for Peltier. In February 2025, Peltier was granted clemency by President Biden and released to house arrest. NDN Collective welcomed his return and arranged for his housing in Turtle Mountain Indian Reservation.

From 2023 onward, NDN Collective has participated in protests against Israel. The group participated in the 2023 National March on Washington: Free Palestine. During a 2024 demonstration, Tilsen stated that "The parallels of our struggle are real...The same system that committed the Native American genocide is the same system that is fueling the genocide in Gaza."

== Funding ==
NDN Collective in late 2021 was named a recipient of a Bush Foundation grant of $50 million. The organization has announced plans to redistribute these funds to indigenous individuals in North Dakota, South Dakota, and Minnesota Through other funding, including grants from the MacArthur and Skoll Foundations, NDN redistributes capital through two loan pools. The Social Enterprise & Economic Development for Indigenous Growth (SEEDING) program offers loans of $500,000 or more, while the Relief & Resilience program provides small business loans to Indigenous entrepreneurs.

Prominent donors to NDN Collective include Mackenzie Scott, in 2021, due to her concerns about wealth inequality, discrimination, and the need for investment in education, and the Jeff Bezos Earth Fund, which in 2020 donated $12 million for their work against climate change.

NDN Collective was also funded by the Target Foundation in 2022, as one of its "Ecosystem" grant recipients. The organization is also slated to receive funding from the Inflation Reduction Act through its affiliation with the Climate Justice Alliance

== Indigenous-led school ==
NDN Collective opened Oceti Sakowin Community Academy, an independent, Indigenous-led school for Native students in Rapid City, with approximately 40 students in September 2022. The school is based upon the Native American Community Academy (NACA) and NACA-inspired schools network (NISN). Mary Bowman, founder of the school, said, "Culturally responsive pedagogy helps students to be engaged, motivated, and develop a strong cultural identity." The opening of this school represents a first step towards the NDN Collective's goals of education equity for Indigenous students.
