= Western Rivers Conservancy =

- Formation: 1988
- Founded: 2001
- Type: 501(c)(3) nonprofit organization
- Headquarters: Portland, Oregon, U.S.
- Region served: Western United States
- Methods: Land acquisition and transfer to public stewards
- Employees: 22
- Volunteers: 24
- Website: www.westernrivers.org

Western Rivers Conservancy is a nonprofit land conservation organization that acquires riverlands in the western United States to protect habitat and improve public access. Established in 1988, the group works on rivers and tributaries across the eleven contiguous western states and has contributed to the protection of hundreds of river miles and tens of thousands of acres.

== Activities ==
Western Rivers Conservancy acquires land along rivers and streams and transfers properties to long-term stewards such as public agencies and conservation partners. The organization reports projects across the eleven contiguous western states. According to reporting in 2024, it has secured protection along more than 250 rivers and streams, including over 440 river miles and 220,000 acres of land in nine states.

== Notable projects ==
In 2019, Western Rivers Conservancy and the Bureau of Land Management completed the conveyance of 11,154 acres along the John Day River in Oregon, creating new overland public access to 78,000 acres of public lands and protecting habitat within the John Day Wild and Scenic River corridor. In California, Western Rivers Conservancy acquired and transferred 47,097 acres along Blue Creek and the lower Klamath River to the Yurok Tribe over a 23-year effort, culminating in 2025 with the final conveyance of 14,968 acres in what has been described as the largest land back conservation action in the state's history.
