= Mount Rushmore Fireworks Celebration =

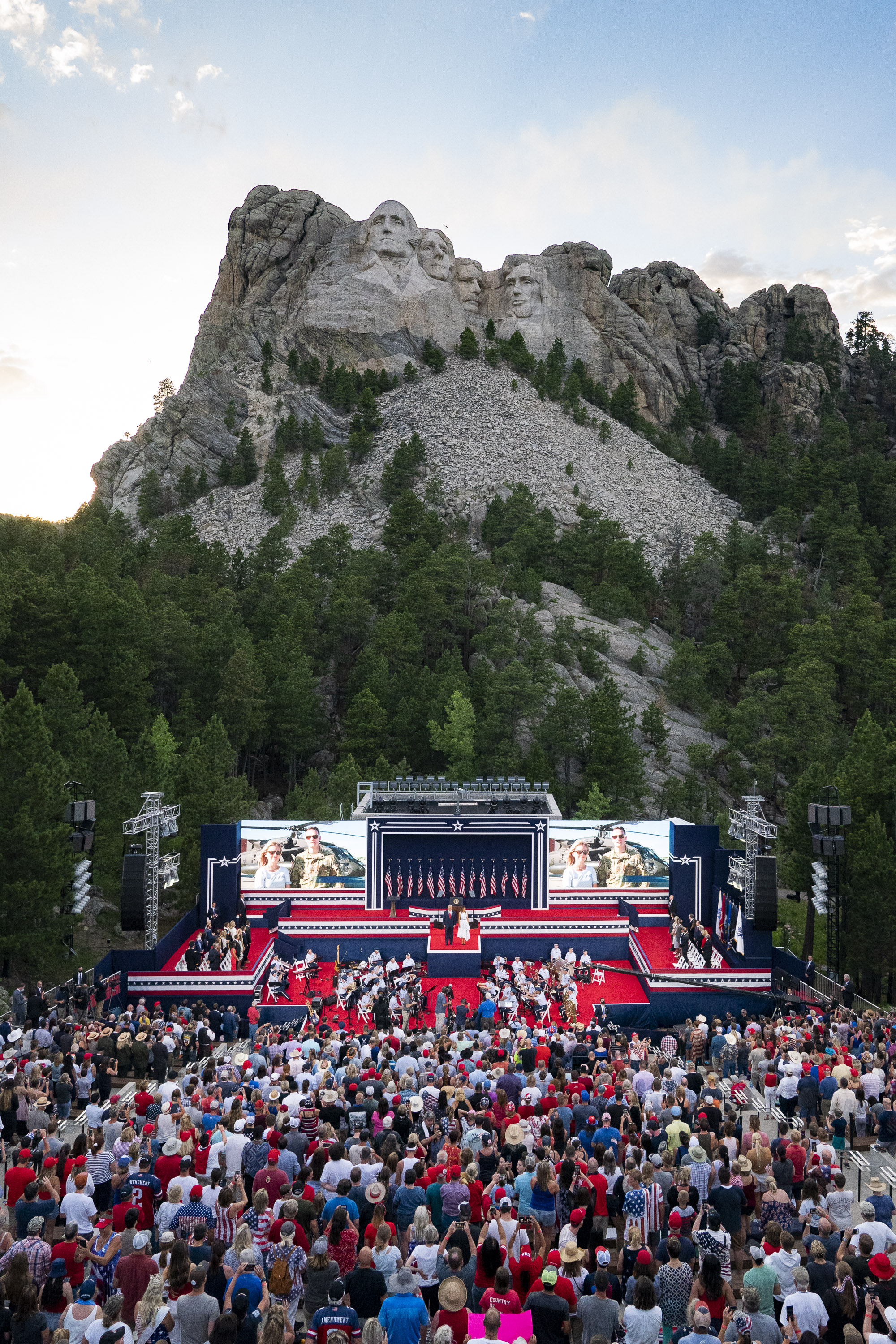
- President Donald Trump and First Lady Melania Trump as they arrive on stage, below Mount Rushmore during the Fourth of July Celebration
- Date: July 3, 2020
- Venue: Mount Rushmore
- Location: Keystone, South Dakota, U.S.; 43°52′44″N 103°27′35″W
- Organised by: Donald Trump

A Fireworks Celebration at Mount Rushmore held on July 3, 2020, was the first of two official uses of fireworks at Mount Rushmore (the other being in 2026) since 2009. President Donald Trump spoke at the event, which was also attended by South Dakota Governor Kristi Noem, host of Entertainment Tonight Mary Hart, First Lady Melania Trump and Trump's eldest son Donald Trump Jr.

The event was controversial for being held amid the ongoing COVID-19 pandemic. The event was also protested by Indigenous people who see Mount Rushmore as a symbol of settler colonialism and dispute ownership of the site as part of the Black Hills land claim. The protests helped establish the Land Back campaign in the US.

== Background ==
Fireworks displays were regularly held at Mount Rushmore between 1998 and 2009. In 2010, the National Park Service stopped fireworks displays because of concerns about wildfires and potential contamination of drinking water.

== Speeches ==
The event included remarks by Mary Hart and Governor Noem. Trump's remarks at the event covered his deploying of law enforcement to protect monuments, repeatedly expressed his support for God, largely ignored the ongoing COVID-19 pandemic in the United States, and included a reiteration to build the border wall. The speech, as described by Matthew Rowley, is all about 'the power of positive history'—by focusing on what made America great, Americans will be moved to greatness; by focusing on failure, Americans will become harsh, judgmental and intolerant. Although the George Floyd protests form the backdrop to Trump's words, the President nowhere mentions police brutality. 'In other words', writes Rowley, Trump seems to argue that 'America is great because it removed the knee from the slave's neck, not wicked because it knelt over the slave for centuries'. Then-U.S. president Trump had been known to share an affinity with Mount Rushmore, even telling South Dakota Gov. Kristi Noem that it is a dream of his to have his own face carved onto the monument. In an article done by Steven Groves he reveals that Trump “joked at a campaign rally about getting enshrined alongside George Washington, Thomas Jefferson, Theodore Roosevelt and Abraham Lincoln. And while it was Noem, a Republican, who pushed for a return of fireworks on the eve of Independence Day, Trump committed to visiting South Dakota for the celebration”.

== The Lakota Nation and Mount Rushmore ==
The most recent indigenous inhabitants of the Black Hills were the Lakota people, who called the area Pahá Sápa (Black Hills). The region was spiritually important and provided food and medicine for Lakota, Cheyenne, and Arapaho communities. In 1874, Lt. Col George Armstrong Custer led an expedition into the Black Hills looking for gold without permission from the tribes. This broke treaties the government had with the tribes; however, the US government allowed gold prospectors to settle in the Black Hills during the Black Hills gold rush. The Sioux Nation was relocated onto reservations, leading to charges that the government was attempting to wipe out Lakota culture. In the early 1900s the Lakota sought to reclaim their lands, and that conflict is ongoing.

In 1927, following the relocation, construction of Mount Rushmore began on the mountain the Lakota referred to as Tunkasila Sakpe, which translates to Six Grandfathers. Doane Robinson proposed the project to increase tourism in the Black Hills and hired sculptor Gutzon Borglum to create a sculpture that honored “the West’s greatest heroes, both Native Americans, and pioneers”. Borglum proposed to Robinson that they use the faces of past U.S. presidents. The Lakota viewed Mount Rushmore as a symbol of United States dominance.

Further protests by Indigenous people occurred at Mount Rushmore in 1970 and 1971, when activists set up camp on top of the memorial for several months demanding return of their land. The protests ended in their arrests. In 1980, the Supreme Court ruled in United States v. Sioux Nation of Indians that the Black Hills belong to the Lakota. The Lakota were offered $17.1 million in compensation for theft of their land, but the nation rejected the offer and demanded return of their land.

== Environmental concerns ==
In an effort to bring awareness to the concern with the event, a report was put out by The National Park Service. Bill Gabbert, an editor at Wildfire Today and Fire Aviation, stated that “fireworks were used at Mount Rushmore on July 3 or 4 from 1998 to 2009, except for 2002 when it was canceled due to the danger of the pyrotechnic display starting a wildfire. During those 11 events 20 documented wildfires were ignited by the fireworks during the middle of the fire season”. Many of these firefighters were placed around the park in order to prevent any larger blazes. The Black Hills is filled with thousands of acres of forest, causing much concern". Gabbert further states concerns regarding the “trash that can never be completely picked up. Left on the sculpture and in the forest are unexploded shells, wadding, plastic, ash, pieces of devices, and paper”. On account of the terrain, cleanup of the pyrotechnic devices is very difficult. Joe Lowe, who served as fire chief for South Dakota's Division of Wildland Fire from 2001 to 2012, stated that the embers from pyrotechnics can ignite the dry terrain surrounding the memorial site, which is why his team was prepared to extinguish potential fires. Firefighters called in crews from other states to help a few days prior to the firework event, as a blaze consumed approximately 150 acres about 6 miles south of Mount Rushmore.

== Protest ==
On the day of the firework celebration, NDN Collective organized a protest of about 200 people that used vehicles as barriers and blocked the road to the park for about three hours, stating individuals were trespassing on sovereign lands of the Great Sioux Nation. In response, law enforcement officers and members of the South Dakota Air and Army National Guard were called in, leading to a skirmish between protestors and law enforcement. Some activists wore eagle feathers, beat drums and faced off with a line of national guardsmen in riot gear. No violence broke out, but 21 activists were arrested on misdemeanor charges. Videos of the protest went viral, as did the “#landback” hashtag and NDN collective's demands for the closing of Mount Rushmore and return of the Black Hills to the Lakota people. Protesters described Mount Rushmore as “an international symbol of white supremacy."

After gaining national attention, tens of thousands of advocates raised money for bail funds and petitioned on behalf of the land defenders. NDN Collective CEO Nick Tilsen was charged with a combination of misdemeanors and felonies that could have led to 17 years in prison. Charges against all the protestors were dropped. Though dismissed from his prison sentence, Tilsen was obligated to attend a diversion program.

Tilsen has discussed his agenda to turn Mount Rushmore back to the tribes. According to an article done by Steven Groves, “prosecutors say that part of the program is admitting wrongdoing and ensuring that offenses don't happen again; however, Tilsen told the Associated Press he is not done pressing for changes to the monument and the Black Hills”. “Wherever you go to connect to God, that’s what the Black Hills are to the Lakota,” said Tilsen. The area is “the heart of everything that is” and sacred to the Lakota people.

Though plans for it had been proposed, in an effort to reduce endangering the relationships with the Lakota, as well as reduce the risk of wildfire, the Fourth of July fireworks were not planned for 2022.

== Effects of the COVID-19 pandemic ==
The event had a large crowd in attendance who did not social distance and were not required to wear masks, despite recommendations to do so by the Center for Disease Control and Prevention and other science experts, due to the ongoing coronavirus pandemic. However, masks were handed out and attendees were given temperature screenings (despite COVID-19 being able to be spread by asymptomatic individuals). Donald Trump Jr.'s girlfriend Kimberly Guilfoyle was also in attendance despite testing positive for the virus the same day.

== See also ==
- National Garden of American Heroes
- 2020 Salute to America
- COVID-19 pandemic in South Dakota
