= Manypenny Agreement =

US Congressional act in 1877

- Passed by: United States Congress
- Passed: February 28, 1877

Summary
- Removed ownership of the Black Hills from Lakota Sioux

Manypenny Agreement is a United States Congressional act passed on February 28, 1877, it officially removed ownership of the Black Hills from the Lakota Sioux and the United States took control of 900,000 acres of the Black Hills.
