= 2019 Salute to America =

2019 event in Washington D.C.

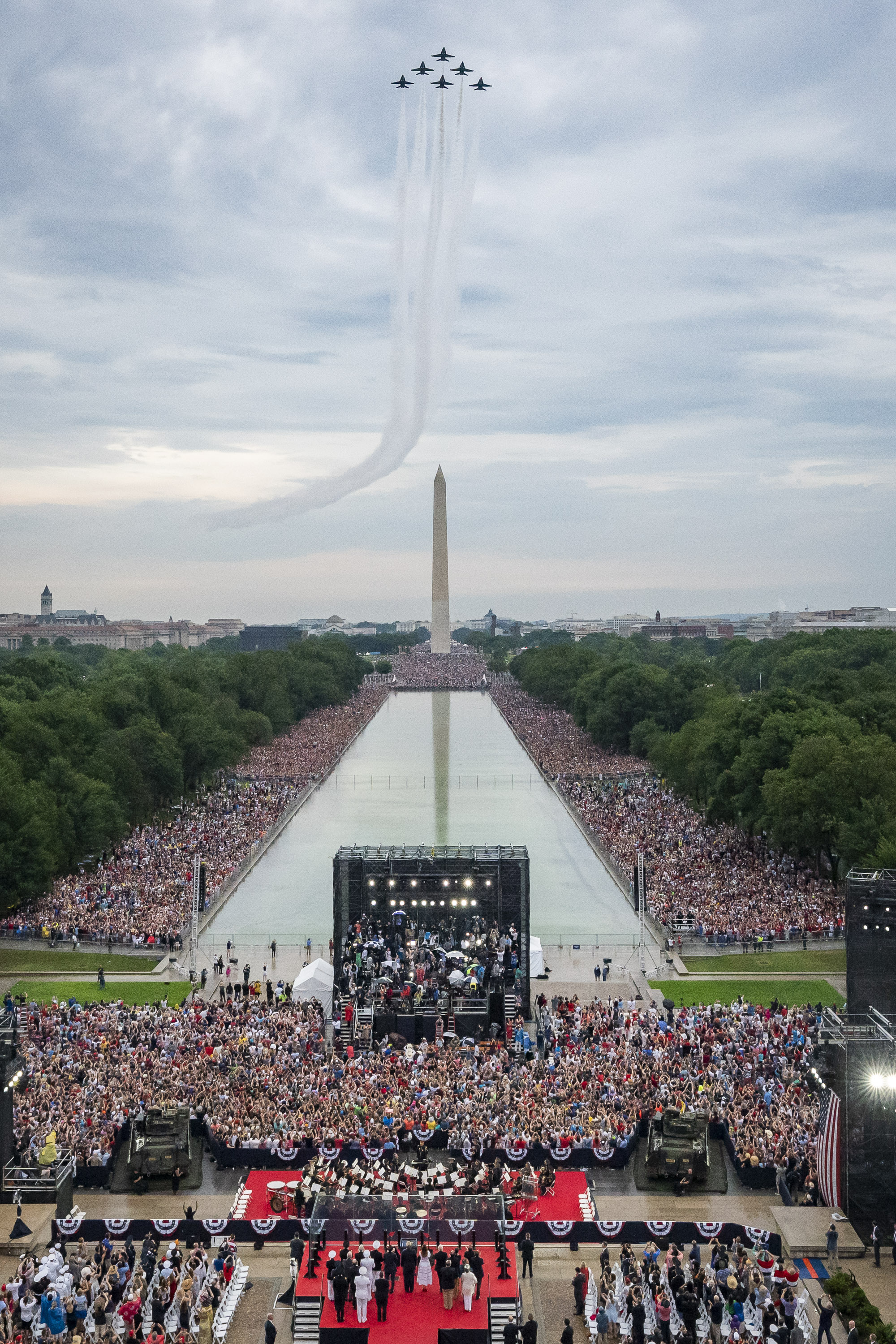
- U.S. Navy Blue Angels conduct a flyover over the National Mall during the Salute to America event
- Date: July 4, 2019
- Time: 6:30–7:30pm EST
- Venue: National Mall
- Location: Washington, D.C., United States; 38°53′21.4″N 77°3′0.5″W

The 2019 Salute to America was an event arranged by the first Trump administration held on Independence Day, July 4, 2019, in Washington, D.C. It took place at the National Mall and included presentations of U.S. military vehicles, an address by President Donald Trump from the Lincoln Memorial, flyovers by military aircraft, and a fireworks display. The event occurred alongside pre-existing annual Independence Day events such as the National Independence Day Parade and the PBS-televised A Capitol Fourth concert. It was the first time a U.S. president had addressed a crowd at the National Mall on Independence Day in 68 years.

There was controversy leading up to the event. Trump's critics expressed concern that the celebration would be a political event reminiscent of his campaign rallies, especially in the early stages of his 2020 re-election campaign. Concerns were also raised over the involvement of the military, the distribution of VIP tickets to donors and members of the Republican Party, as well as the cost of the event.

Trump's speech focused largely on praising the United States' cultural and military accomplishments and featured themes of American exceptionalism and patriotism.

== Background ==
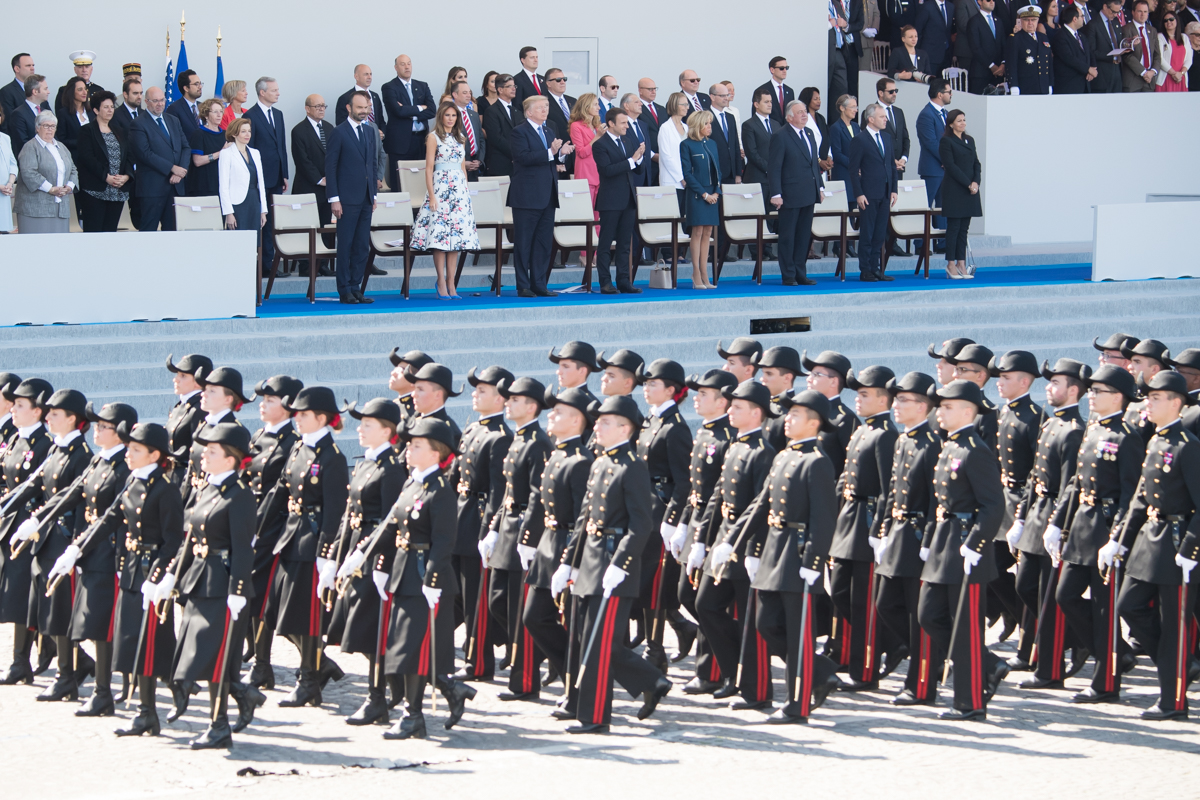
President Donald Trump attending the 2017 Bastille Day military parade in Paris, France

In 2017, President Donald Trump was invited by French President Emmanuel Macron to attend the Bastille Day military parade in Paris on July 14, in honor of the countries' diplomatic relations and the centenary of the United States' entry into World War I. Following the parade, Trump expressed admiration for the event and said he wanted the United States to "top it" with a similar, military-focused event. Trump proposed a military parade be held in Washington on Veterans Day in 2018, in honor of the centenary of World War I's conclusion. However, Trump later withdrew the proposal due to cost concerns.

In February 2019, Trump announced on Twitter plans for a "Salute to America" celebration on Independence Day, promising entertainment, a "major" fireworks display and "an address by your favorite President, me!" It was later revealed that this speech would be given from the steps of the Lincoln Memorial. Trump would become the first president to speak there since Harry Truman marked the 175th anniversary of the signing of the Declaration of Independence in an address from the National Mall on Independence Day, 1951.

The National Park Service stated that Trump's event was not expected to conflict with other traditional Independence Day events held at the Capitol like the National Independence Day Parade, the televised A Capitol Fourth concert, and its associated fireworks display— although, due to Salute to America, fireworks were launched from West Potomac Park, rather than the Lincoln Memorial Reflecting Pool. The producers of A Capitol Fourth distanced themselves from the president's planned festivities, emphasizing they were an independent and separate event. Due to Trump's presence, the Federal Aviation Administration suspended flights at Reagan Airport during the event.

== Funding ==
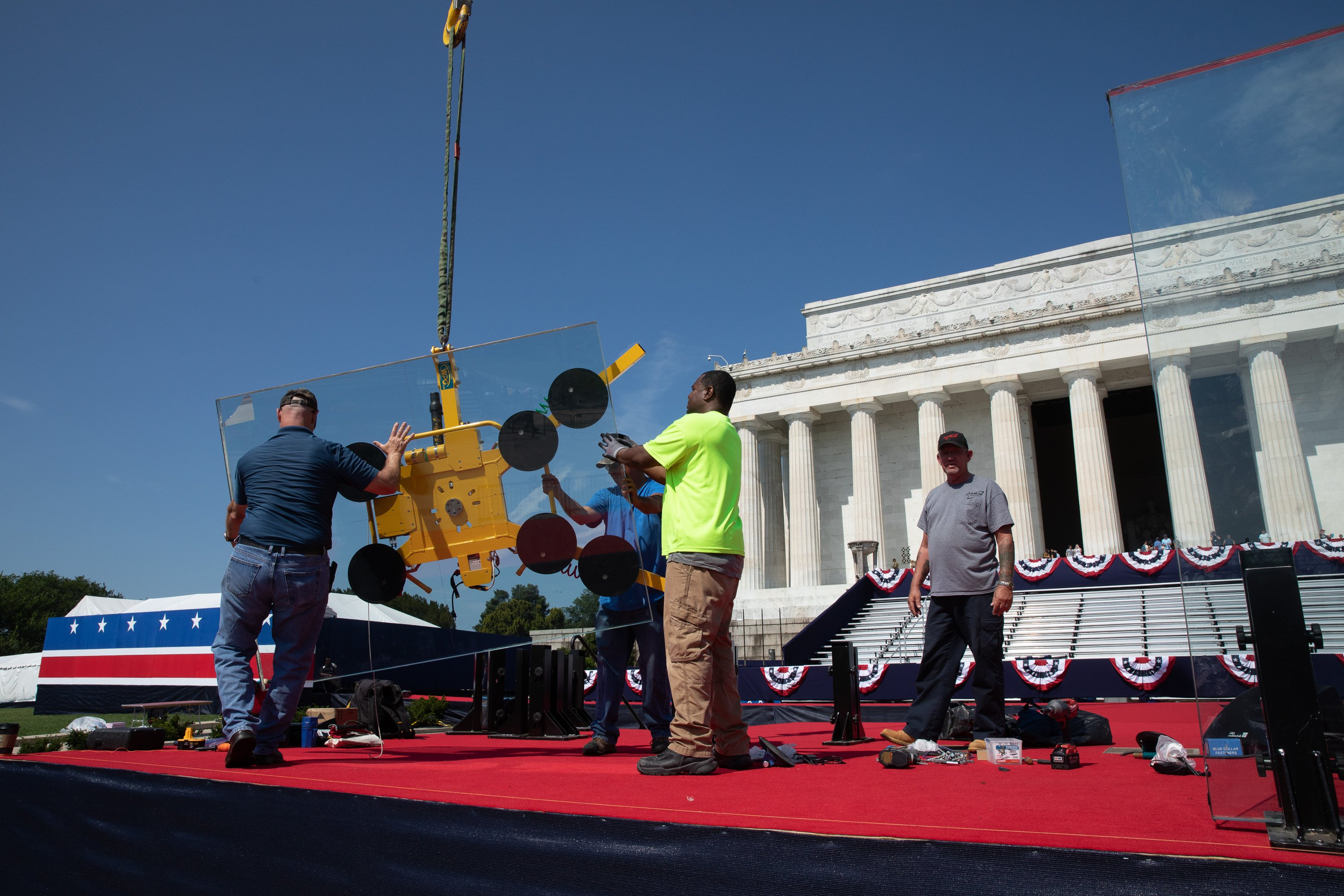
Preparation for the event at the Lincoln Memorial

The Department of Defense and the White House have not confirmed the total cost of the event. As of July 11, 2019, a "rough total" cost was reported to be $5.4 million.

It was reported that $2.45 million in entrance and recreation fees were diverted from the National Park Service to cover logistical and medical services—funds normally intended for maintenance and improvements to national parks. D.C. mayor Muriel Bowser said the city's additional security costs for the event amounted to $1.7 million, not including police management of demonstrations. Funding was provided by the District's Emergency Planning and Security Fund; a congressional committee was subsequently formed on July 12 to seek reimbursement of this fund by the White House.

The military's role in Salute to America cost the Department of Defense $1.2 million, including the cost of flying hours for the aerial demonstrations and logistics, particularly transportation for the two M1 Abrams tanks, the two M2 Bradley IFVs, and related equipment. The Pentagon stated that this funding came from training budgets, but did not provide a breakdown of the figure, causing speculation that $1.2 million is a low estimate. The Department of Defense noted it has a "long history of showcasing military assets to the country" and spends comparable amounts of money, if not more, during events such as Fleet Week. For example, the 2017 San Francisco Fleet Week cost $1.8 million, and the 2018 Los Angeles Fleet Week cost $1.6 million.

U.S. Park Police collaborate with the District of Columbia National Guard for the Salute to America event

Fireworks by Grucci produced the fireworks display, while Phantom Fireworks donated $750,000 in additional shells; both companies donated a combined $1.3 million in pyrotechnics for the show. The display was held in tandem with annual Independence Day fireworks produced by Garden State Fireworks under contract with the National Park Service. It was subsequently promoted as surpassing the Bicentennial fireworks as one of the largest fireworks displays in Washington, D.C., in terms of size and length.

=== Lobbying concerns ===
ABC News reported that Phantom Fireworks CEO Bruce Zoldan had met with Trump in May 2019 to discuss proposed expansions of U.S. trade tariffs against China that would have added tariffs on pyrotechnics. China is the largest producer of pyrotechnics in the world, and the majority of fireworks in the U.S. are imported from there. At the G20 summit the following month, Trump announced he would resume trade talks with China and postpone additional tariffs. In an interview with WTOP-FM, Zoldan stated that discussions regarding Phantom's involvement in the show pre-dated the meeting by two months and that the meeting was a general discussion on tariffs, not from the perspective of any specific industry.

== Participants ==
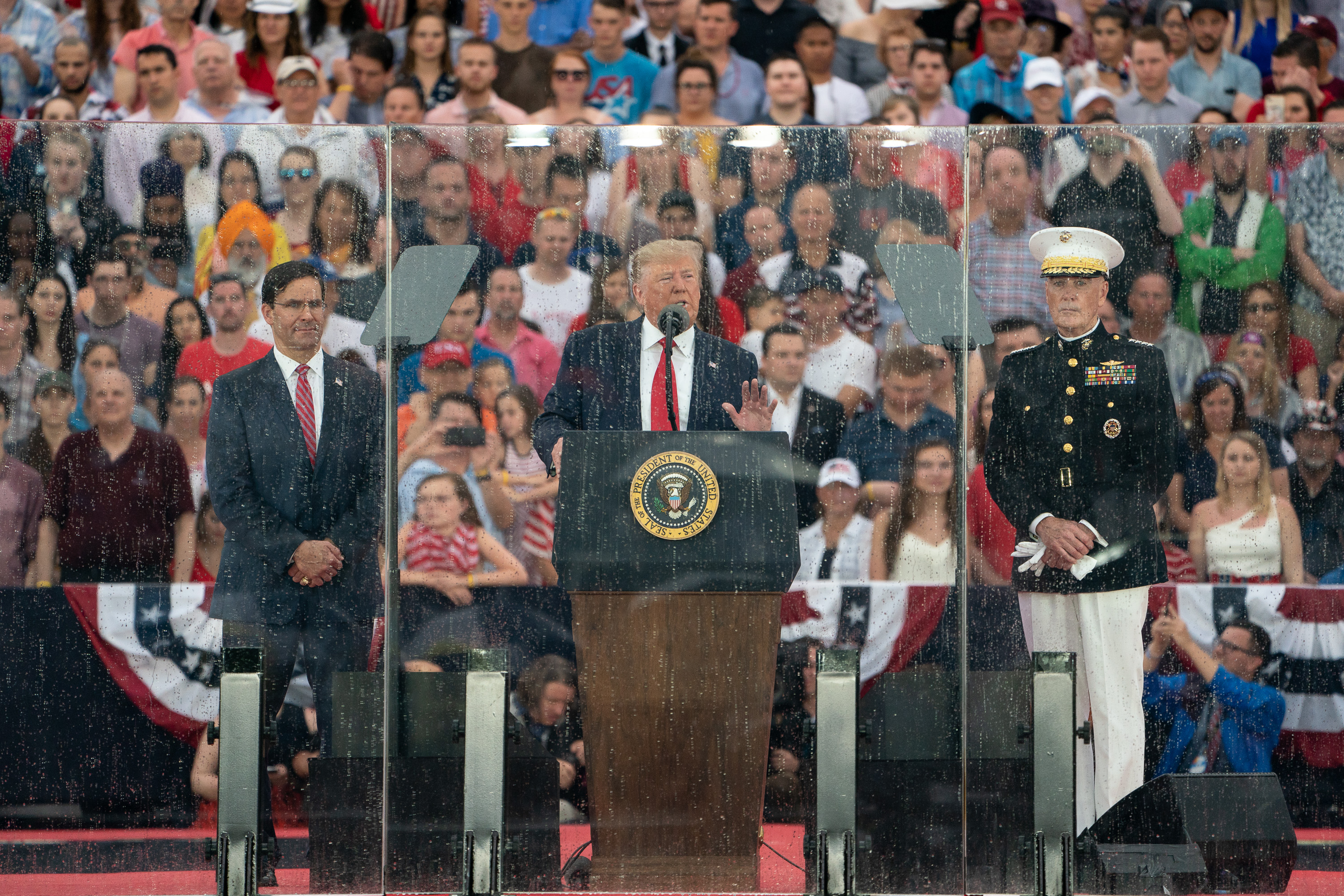
Trump addressing the crowd at the Lincoln Memorial. He is flanked by then-Acting Secretary of Defense Mark Esper (left) and Chairman of the Joint Chiefs of Staff Joseph Dunford (right)

Salute to America featured fireworks, seven flyovers, and musical performances, as well as the first address from the National Mall on Independence Day by a sitting president in 68 years. Trump's address honored the history of the United States and praised the achievements of historical American figures, including George Washington, John Adams, Thomas Jefferson, Betsy Ross, Frederick Douglass, Harriet Tubman, Amelia Earhart, Douglas MacArthur, Fred Trump, Dwight D. Eisenhower, Martin Luther King Jr., Jackie Robinson, and John Glenn. Special guests included Florida hurricane volunteer Tina "Angel" Belcher, cancer biologist Emil J. Freireich, Civil rights movement hero Clarence Henderson, and flight director for NASA's Apollo 11 mission Gene Kranz.

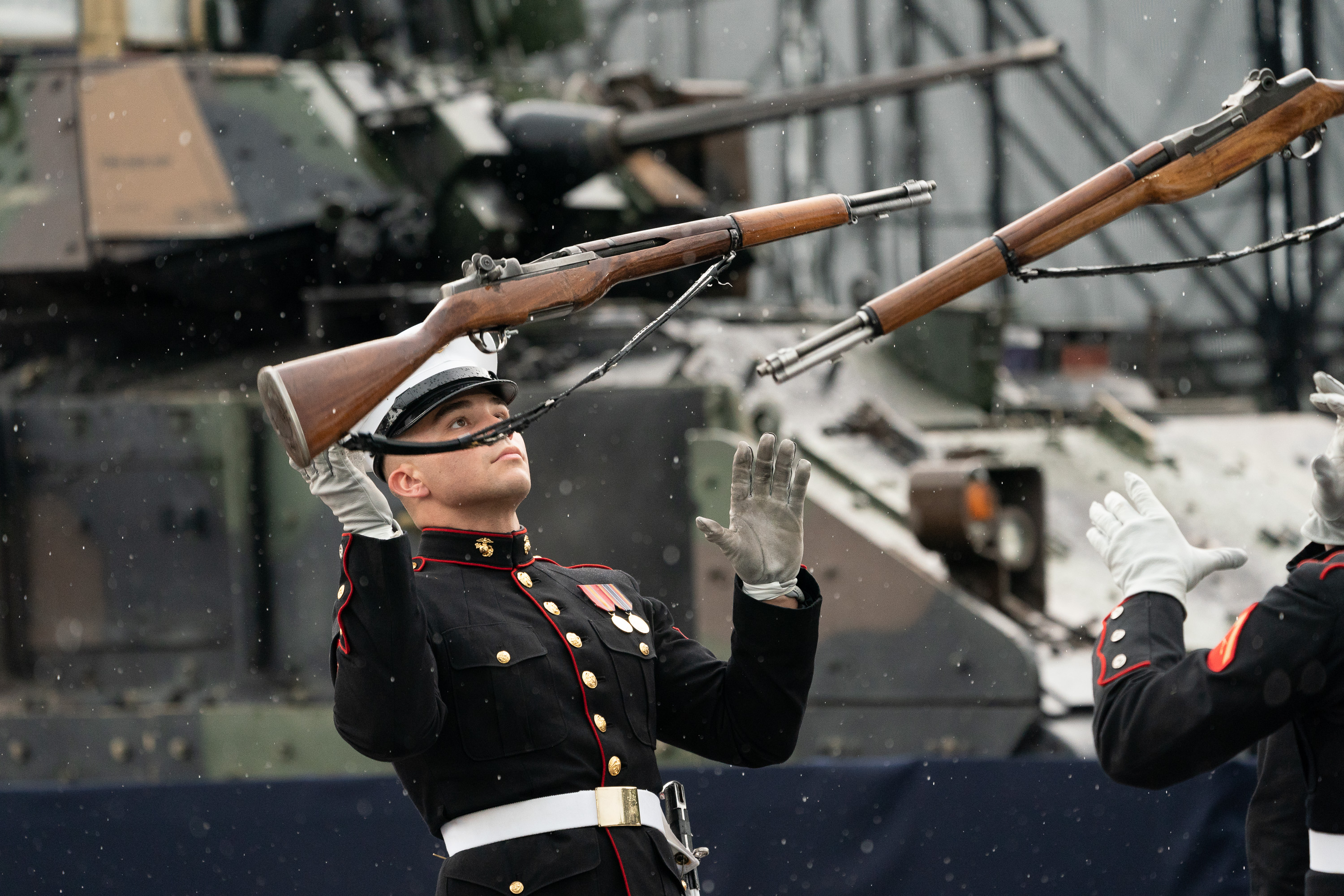
Members of the Silent Drill Platoon performing at Salute to America

Salute to America featured an overarching theme of American military appreciation and patriotism. Trump requested the inclusion of tanks, and that the chiefs of the Air Force, Army, Marines, and Navy stand next to him on stage during the event. However, due to preparations beginning only weeks prior to the occasion, most of the joint chiefs were on leave or traveling and were not available to attend. The chairman of the Joint Chiefs of Staff, General Joseph Dunford Jr., was available and attended, joining the president and then-Acting Secretary of Defense Mark Esper on stage halfway through the president's address. Trump had wanted tanks to be part of the parade, but was told they were too heavy and could "tear up the streets". Instead, two Abrams tanks and two Bradley infantry fighting vehicles were put on static display.

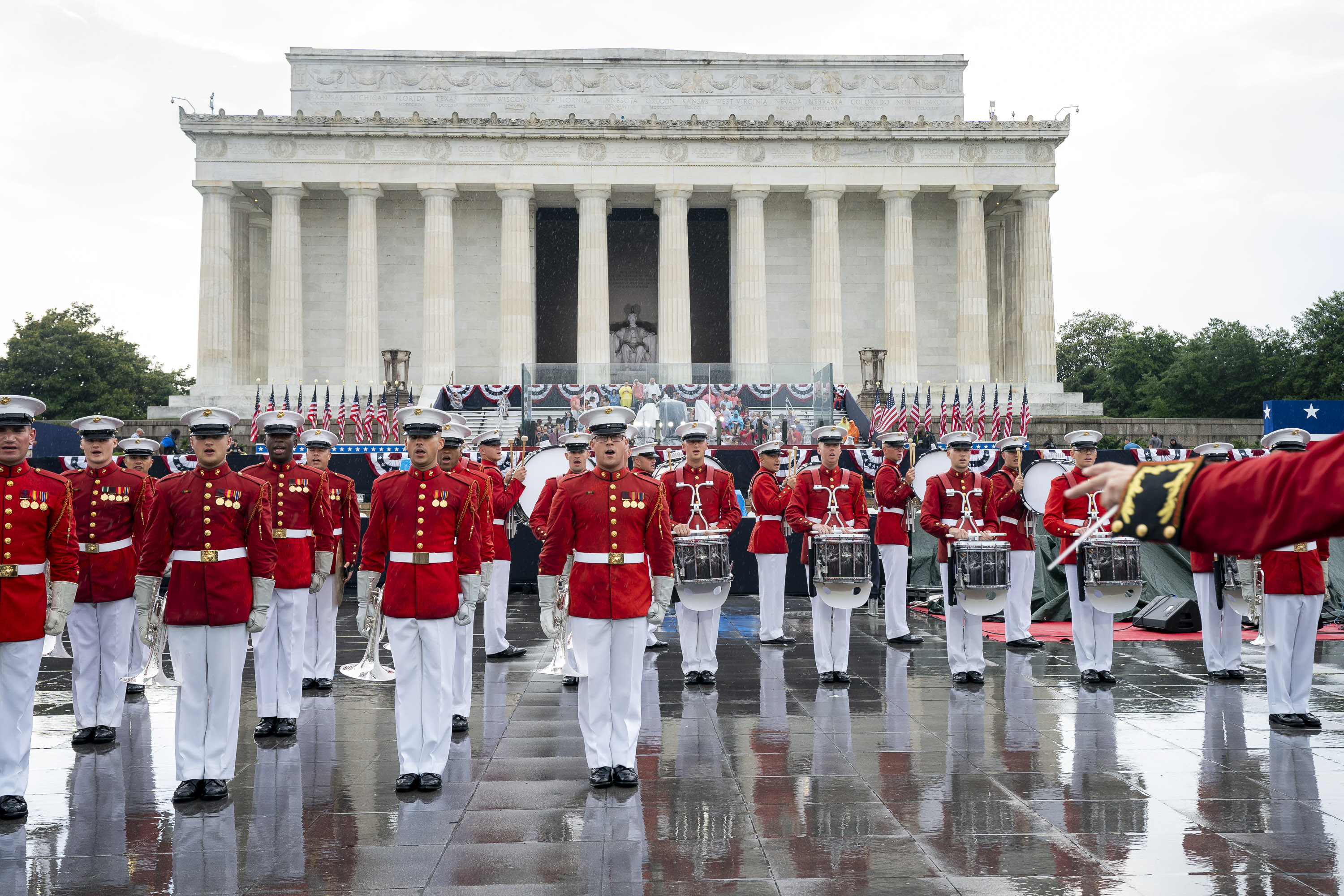
The United States Marine Drum and Bugle Corps at the Salute to America.

Department of Defense footage of the flyovers during Salute to America

The United States Marine Corps Silent Drill Platoon performed exhibition drills and the Marine Drum and Bugle Corps, Army Old Guard Fife and Drum Corps and the Army Band (Pershing's Own) provided musical performances. The Army Band performed several renditions during Trump's address, including "Semper Paratus", "The U.S. Air Force", "Anchors Aweigh", "Marines' Hymn", and "The Army Goes Rolling Along" (all of which make up the Armed Forces Medley).

Military equipment representing each service branch of the United States Armed Forces were showcased and demonstrated. Two M1A2 Abrams tanks and two M2 Bradley IFVs from the 3rd Infantry Division were put on stationary display around the Lincoln Memorial for the public while aircraft representing each service branch conducted flyovers during Trump's address. Trump introduced the Coast Guard first, represented by two HH-60 Jayhawks and an HH-65 Dolphin helicopter from Coast Guard Station, Annapolis, Maryland. Subsequent flyovers included: a B-2 Spirit from the 509th Bomb Wing escorted by two F-22 Raptors from the 1st Fighter Wing, two F-35 Joint Strike Fighters from VFA-147 and two F/A-18 Hornets from VFA-37 together in diamond formation, two V-22 Ospreys from HMX-1, and four AH-64 Apache helicopters from the 101st Combat Aviation Brigade. Presidential aircraft, particularly the Air Force One aircraft and the next-generation VH-92 Marine One, also participated. The aerial demonstrations were followed up by a performance by the Navy's Blue Angels flight demonstration squadron.

== Attendance and media coverage ==
A perimeter was constructed around the Lincoln Memorial with wire fencing spanning the Reflecting Pool to separate the ticketed areas intended for VIP spectators from the public. VIP tickets were distributed to the Republican National Committee (RNC), government officials, GOP donors, and other political allies. Politico reported that some donors and Republican Party members were reluctant to attend the event as they were already on vacation elsewhere. It also reported that lotteries were being held to give away blocks of 10 tickets each to White House employees. This is a common practice for White House events, but not normally in such a large quantity.

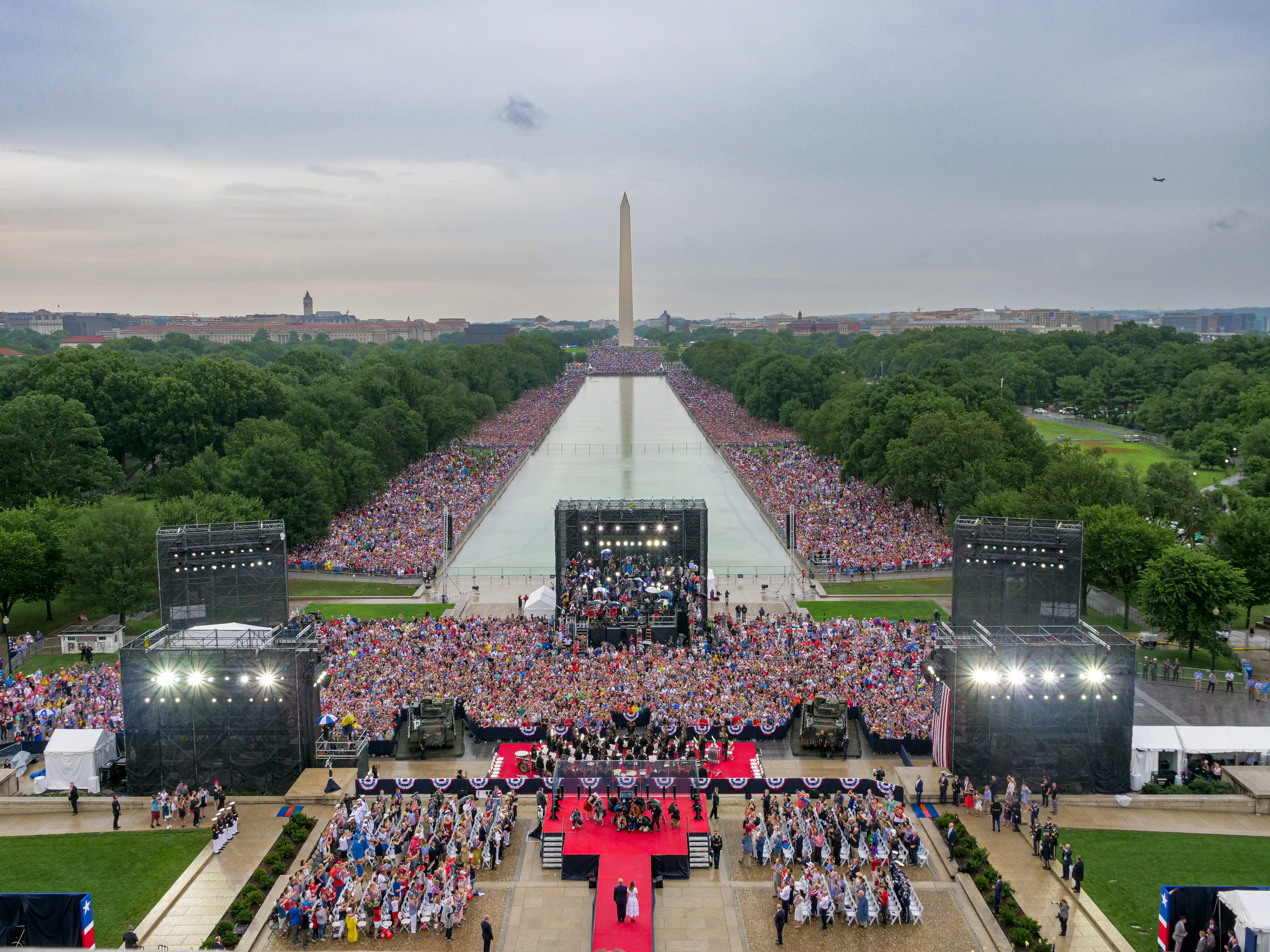
View from the top of the Lincoln Memorial of the crowd gathered along the Reflecting Pool during the 2019 Salute to America event, with Donald and Melania Trump onstage.

Concerns over the attendance at the event were compared to the Trump administration's claims regarding crowd size and viewership of his 2017 inauguration. Official estimates of the number of attendees were not immediately available. Multiple photographs taken during the event showed large crowds both within the guest section and of the public on the National Mall, including tourists and general event-goers. Weather affected the event; rainstorms passed through the area, while temperature inversion caused the smoke from the fireworks display to accumulate, partially obscuring spectators' views of the show.

The White House's livestream of Salute to America

Of the major cable news channels, only Fox News Channel agreed to air continual live coverage, with CNN and MSNBC initially declining in favor of previously scheduled encore programming. C-SPAN also aired the event. The news departments of the Big Three television networks relegated live coverage to their respective digital platforms. Both CNN and Fox News carried Trump's speech given in front of the Lincoln Memorial live. CNN's coverage of the event averaged 1.5 million viewers, with 353,000 viewers among adults 25–54 years old—a key demographic for advertisers. MSNBC's coverage garnered a total audience of 374,000 viewers and 42,000 among 25–54 year olds. Fox News had the largest viewership, with an average 4.6 million viewers and 793,000 among adults aged 25–54. This beat CNN and MSNBC's combined viewership in both categories and topped NBC's prime time coverage of the Macy's Independence Day fireworks show from New York City, which averaged 3.8 million total viewers—its lowest ratings in four years. It was Fox News Channel's highest Independence Day audience since its founding in October 1996.

== Reception ==
President Trump's supporters and allies considered the event to be a display of the president's pride in the country and its military. Comparisons were drawn to "Honor America Day"—a 1970 Independence Day rally at the Capitol in support of Richard Nixon, in the wake of controversy over the invasion of Cambodia and the Kent State shootings. That event also faced opposition, notably by anti-Vietnam War protesters and other protesters smoking cannabis in support of its legalization.

=== Pre-event concerns and criticism ===
Prior to the event, Michelle Cottle of The New York Times, former House Republican David Jolly, and radio host Charlie Sykes accused Trump of turning the "non-partisan" Independence Day holiday into a political event—co-opting the celebration to promote his 2020 presidential re-election campaign.

Pre-event concerns were also expressed over the prominent incorporation of the military; retired lieutenant general David Barno told Politico that Salute to America "looks like it's becoming much more of a Republican Party event—a political event about the president—than a national celebration of the Fourth of July" and that it was "absolutely obscene" for Trump to "[use] the armed forces in a political ploy for his reelection campaign." Some military and Pentagon officials had raised similar concerns. Citizens for Responsibility and Ethics in Washington noted that Department of Defense rules forbid military members from participating in political events and that the Hatch Act could also potentially apply. Some media outlets also reported on the potential damage military vehicles could cause to local roads. It was later confirmed that while military vehicles would be featured during the event, they would be parked on the National Mall and not parading.

Democratic Senator Tom Udall argued it was "unacceptable that the Interior Department is failing to inform Congress about how it plans to spend taxpayer money to fund the president's lavish July 4th plans, which reportedly include special access to the National Mall for the politically connected." Trump downplayed these concerns, saying that the event would cost "very little compared to what it is worth". The Republican National Committee defended its distribution of tickets, citing it as common practice for the incumbent party's committee to distribute tickets to events of this nature.

Journalist and writer Jeff Greenfield noted that prior presidents had given speeches on Independence Day and political parties have used the holiday as a platform since their inception. He added that the inclusion of military equipment could be excused as Trump's attempt to "emulate Thomas Jefferson" in 1801 rather than an authoritarian celebration of militarism "more common to Moscow and Pyongyang." However, Greenfield did argue that Trump, with his affinity for "over-the-top celebrations and honors", was "wreathing himself" in the monuments of the Capitol, "the most potent symbols of American history ... without any appreciation for the history that made that whole landscape possible."

=== Protests ===
The National Park Service issued a permit allowing the activist organization Code Pink to display a Donald Trump baby balloon during the event. It was grounded and did not contain helium to enable it to float. The group also brought the animatronic Dump Trump sculpture—a caricature of Trump using his phone while sitting on a golden toilet.

Around 5:30 pm local, an hour before Trump's speech, two members of the Revolutionary Communist Party were arrested by Secret Service officers after scuffles broke out with counter-protesters during a flag burning protest in front of the White House. One of those arrested was charged with malicious burning and felony assault on a police officer, and the other with obstructing a police investigation and resisting arrest. The Secret Service said the flag burning display occurred "outside the limits of a permit issued by the National Park Service."

=== Post-event ===
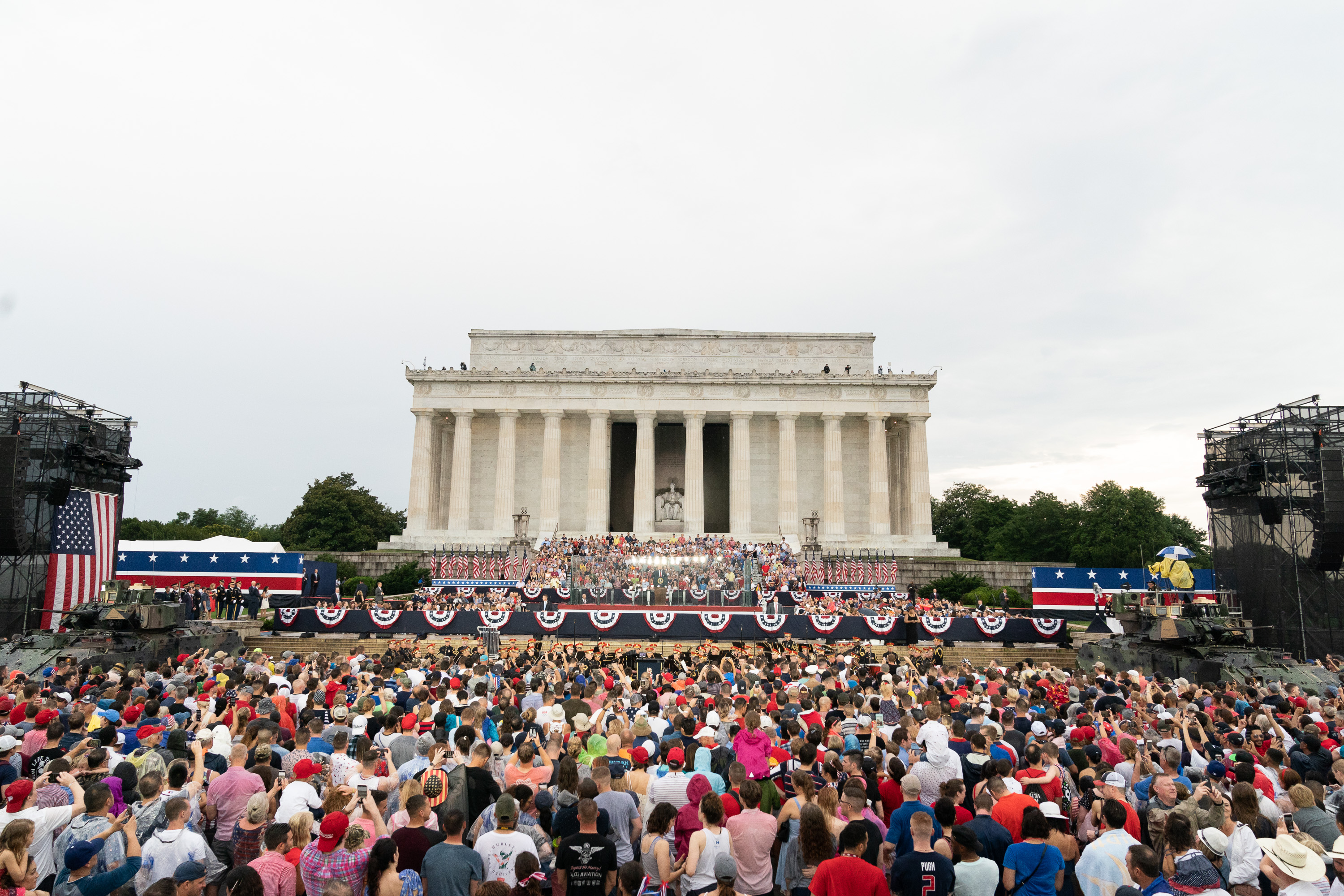
Trump addressing the crowd at the Lincoln Memorial. Two M2 Bradleys are showcased.

David Smith of The Guardian acknowledged that Trump's 47-minute speech "did not fulfill his critics' worst fears of a politically partisan, campaign-style rally", and mostly avoided partisan politics in favor of "a heroic version of American military history". However, Smith suggested that the event as a whole did "provide the bombastic show of military might that had been widely predicted" and noted the event resembled a Trump campaign rally because many audience members chanted pro-Trump slogans, wore Make America Great Again hats and held "Trump 2020" signs. He observed that "in a city that projects power through monuments, statues and its own Capitol, critics said it was the moment Trump went full Roman emperor, turning a traditionally nonpartisan day of events into a vanity project."

Trump mentions "airports"

Trump was criticized for making incorrect statements about the American Revolutionary War in a section of the speech, recounting that the Continental Army "took over the airports"—airplanes were yet to be invented—and had "nothing but victory" in the Battle of Baltimore, which took place during the War of 1812, not the Revolutionary War. Trump attributed the "airports" gaffe to his teleprompter malfunctioning and being difficult to read in the rain. Some Canadian news outlets took exception to Trump referencing Alexander Graham Bell's invention of the telephone as a result of the United States' "unleashed" "culture of discovery"; Bell was Scottish-born and spent time in both Canada and the United States while developing the telephone, though he did file his first patent on the telephone in the United States.

In a letter to Trump after the event, D.C. Mayor Muriel Bowser asked for reimbursement of the city's expenses, saying Salute to America had exhausted D.C.'s Emergency Planning and Security Fund, a federally funded reserve account intended to reimburse the city for extra security and anti-terrorism measures during large federal events. She said the costs of "your additional July 4th holiday activities and subsequent First Amendment demonstrations" had depleted the account and would soon leave it in the red.

On July 8, three Democratic members of the Senate Appropriations Committee requested the Government Accountability Office investigate the costs and legality of the event. Also on July 8, Trump announced his intentions to hold a second Salute to America event in 2020, although, in 2020, the occurrence of the event was called into question due to the COVID-19 pandemic in the United States, with at least ten lawmakers having asked President Trump to cancel the planned second celebration. The administration nevertheless held the 2020 Salute to America on July 4, 2020.

== See also ==
- South Dakota's Mount Rushmore Fireworks Celebration 2020
- National Garden of American Heroes
- United States Semiquincentennial
- U.S. Army 250th Anniversary Parade
