= Bach festival =

Celebration of the music of Bach

A Bach festival is a music festival held to celebrate the memory of the German composer Johann Sebastian Bach (1685–1750). Various locations throughout the world hold festivals dedicated to Bach. A notable example is the Bachfest Leipzig, held each year in the city of Leipzig, where the composer worked as Thomaskantor for the last 27 years of his life.

== Historical festivals ==
=== Baldwin Wallace Bach Festival ===
The Baldwin Wallace Conservatory of Music at Baldwin Wallace University is home to the BW Bach Festival, the oldest collegiate Bach festival in the nation. The festival was founded in 1932 by Professor Albert Riemenschneider (longtime director of the College Conservatory) and his wife Selma. The then Baldwin-Wallace Festival Choir and Orchestra presented the first Bach Festival in June 1933 and has continued since then. The oldest Bach Festival, The Bethlehem, and Baldwin Wallace performed together for BW's 75th anniversary of the festival.

=== Winter Park Bach Festival ===
The Bach Festival Society of Winter Park, in the city of Winter Park, Florida, USA, was founded in 1935 at Rollins College to commemorate the 250th anniversary of Johann Sebastian Bach's birth by presenting the composer's orchestral and choral music to the public "for its enlightenment, education, pleasure, and enjoyment" at Knowles Memorial Chapel. Isabelle Sprague-Smith, a former New York artist and school principal, was the president and driving force behind the Bach Festival from 1935 until her death in 1950. At Sprague-Smith's death, the future of the Bach Festival was uncertain. Rollins President Hugh F. McKean (husband to Jeannette Genius McKean) asked John M. Tiedtke, the treasurer of the College, to fulfill the obligation and he accepted. Tiedtke served as Chairman of the Board of Trustees until his death in December 2004. The festival has been presented each year since 1935, and has expanded to a multi-week event including chamber music, lectures, master classes, and community events. The current Artistic Director and Conductor of the Bach Festival Society of Winter Park is John V. Sinclair.

== Notable Bach festivals ==
- Bach in the Subways
- Bach Music Festival of Canada
- Bachfest Leipzig
- Bachwoche Ansbach
- Baldwin Wallace Bach Festival
- Carmel Bach Festival
- English Bach Festival
- Oregon Bach Festival
- Thüringer Bachwochen
- Tilford Bach Festival
- The WQXR All-Day Bach Organ Marathon
- Bachfestival Antwerpen
- Bachfestival Dordrecht

== See also ==
- Early music festivals
