= Medley (music) =

Piece composed from parts of existing pieces of music

In music, a medley is a piece composed from parts of existing pieces played one after another, sometimes overlapping. They are common in popular music, and most medleys are songs rather than instrumentals. A medley which is a remixed series is called a megamix, often done with tracks for a single artist, or for popular songs from a given year or genre. A cover version combining elements of multiple pre-existing songs is a cover medley. (Note: When a piece of music specifically superimposes elements of multiple pre-existing songs at the same time, it is more particularly referred to as a mashup.)

A medley is the most common form of overture for musical theatre productions.

In Latin music, medleys are known as potpourrís or mosaicos; the latter were popularized by artists such as Roberto Faz and Billo Frómeta, and most commonly consist of boleros, guarachas, merengues or congas.

== See also ==
- Segue, a term for the transition between songs
- DJ mix
- Megamix
- Mashup (music)
- List of Genesis medleys
- List of "Weird Al" Yankovic polka medleys
- Suite (music)
- Sound collage
- Armed Forces Medley
