= Candlelight Processional (Disney Parks) =

Annual Christmas event at the Disney theme parks

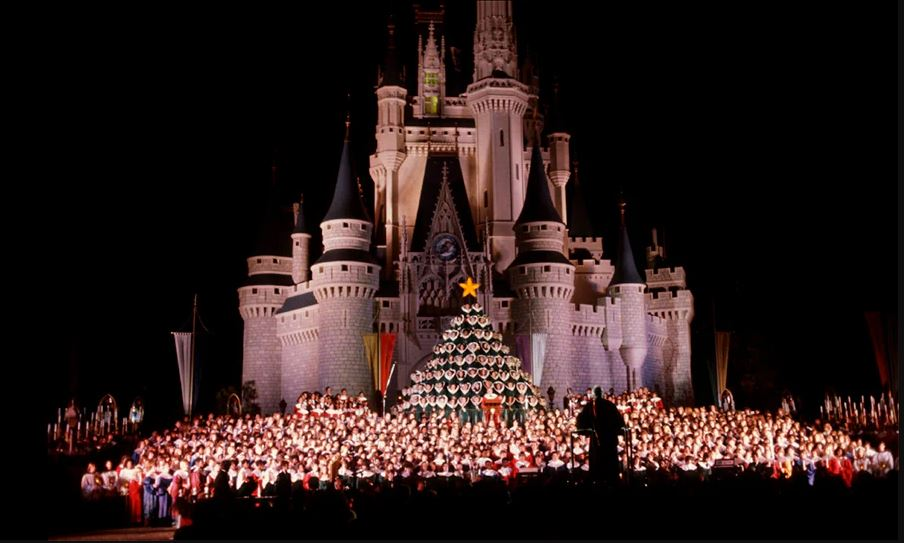

Disneyland Park
- Area: Main Street Station (1958–1997); Fantasyland Theatre (1998–2002); Main Street Station (2003–present)
- Status: Operating
- Opening date: 1958; First narrator: Dennis Morgan (1960); Most recent narrator: Benjamin Bratt (2025)

Magic Kingdom Park
- Area: Cinderella Castle and Main Street Station (alternating)
- Status: Closed
- Opening date: 1971; First narrator: Rock Hudson (1971); Final narrator: James Earl Jones (1993)
- Closing date: 1993 (moved to EPCOT)

EPCOT
- Area: America Gardens Theater
- Status: Operating
- Opening date: 1994 (EPCOT); First narrator: Phylicia Rashad; Most recent narrators: (see below)

Ride statistics
- Attraction type: Seasonal event
- Theme: Christmas and the nativity
- Season: November–December

The Candlelight Processional is an annual live Christmas event held in Disneyland Park in Anaheim, California and Epcot at the Walt Disney World Resort in Bay Lake, Florida. Through a live orchestra, choir, and narration, the show retells the nativity of Jesus Christ and the story of "the first Christmas".

Created by Walt Disney and begun in 1958, it has become an annual holiday tradition for both resorts. The processional is currently performed for only two nights in December at Disneyland, and throughout the entire month of December at Epcot.

== Event history ==
=== Disneyland ===
For the first holiday season at Disneyland in 1955, Walt Disney and Disneyland entertainment director Tommy Walker enlisted the help of Dr. Charles C. Hirt, director of choral music at the USC Thornton School of Music, to hire and train a group of traditional Christmas carolers for atmosphere entertainment. Guest choirs and performing groups were also brought in to play at a small bandstand near Sleeping Beauty Castle, which was renamed the Christmas Bowl.

On the opening day of the park's Christmas festivities in 1955, the carolers, guest choirs, and school bands scheduled to perform that day formed a 300-person mass choir on the steps of the Main Street Station. The mass choir returned the following year, this time accompanied by the Disneyland Band. In 1957, the guest choirs formed a procession for the first time and followed the Christmas Around the World Parade from the castle to the Central Plaza (or Hub).

The carolers and choirs were a hit with guests. Hirt suggested to Disney that a candlelight procession and ceremony would play well in the park. Disney agreed, and the first Candlelight Procession took place in 1958. The choirs moved north from Main Street to the Hub and performed facing Hirt, who was conducting in the center of the massed choir. But the ceremony was difficult for the audience to view outside the circle.

In 1960, the ceremony was moved back to Town Square and bleachers were constructed to form a temporary stage on Main Street Station so the choirs were more visible. As a visual centerpiece for the stage, a "living Christmas tree" was created by Western High School choral director Alexander Encheff, whose a cappella choir students populated the tree risers. Encheff and the living Christmas tree had been part of the previous two Candlelight performances near Sleeping Beauty Castle.

Another important addition to the ceremony in 1960 was the celebrity narrator, who would read the Nativity story directly from the Bible. Actor Dennis Morgan was the first narrator, and began a long tradition of people from stage, screen, and sports lending their talents to the ceremony.

Walt Disney continued to support the event until his death in 1966, and last attended the processional in December 1965 with Dick Van Dyke as narrator. Disney saw the event as a "thank you" for local dignitaries and other government officials for their cooperation in the operation of the park. Seats for the event were by invitation only.

Hirt continued to conduct the Candlelight ceremony (whose musical accompaniment had evolved over three years from the 16-piece Disneyland Band to a full orchestra) until his retirement in 1981, sharing duties with other music directors such as James Christensen, who also contributed music arrangements. Sheldon Disrud, director of choral music at Fullerton College in Fullerton, California, conducted and wrote music for the Candlelight Procession during the 1980s. Nancy Sulahian has conducted the Disneyland version most recently. She is currently director of choral music at Caltech in Pasadena, California.

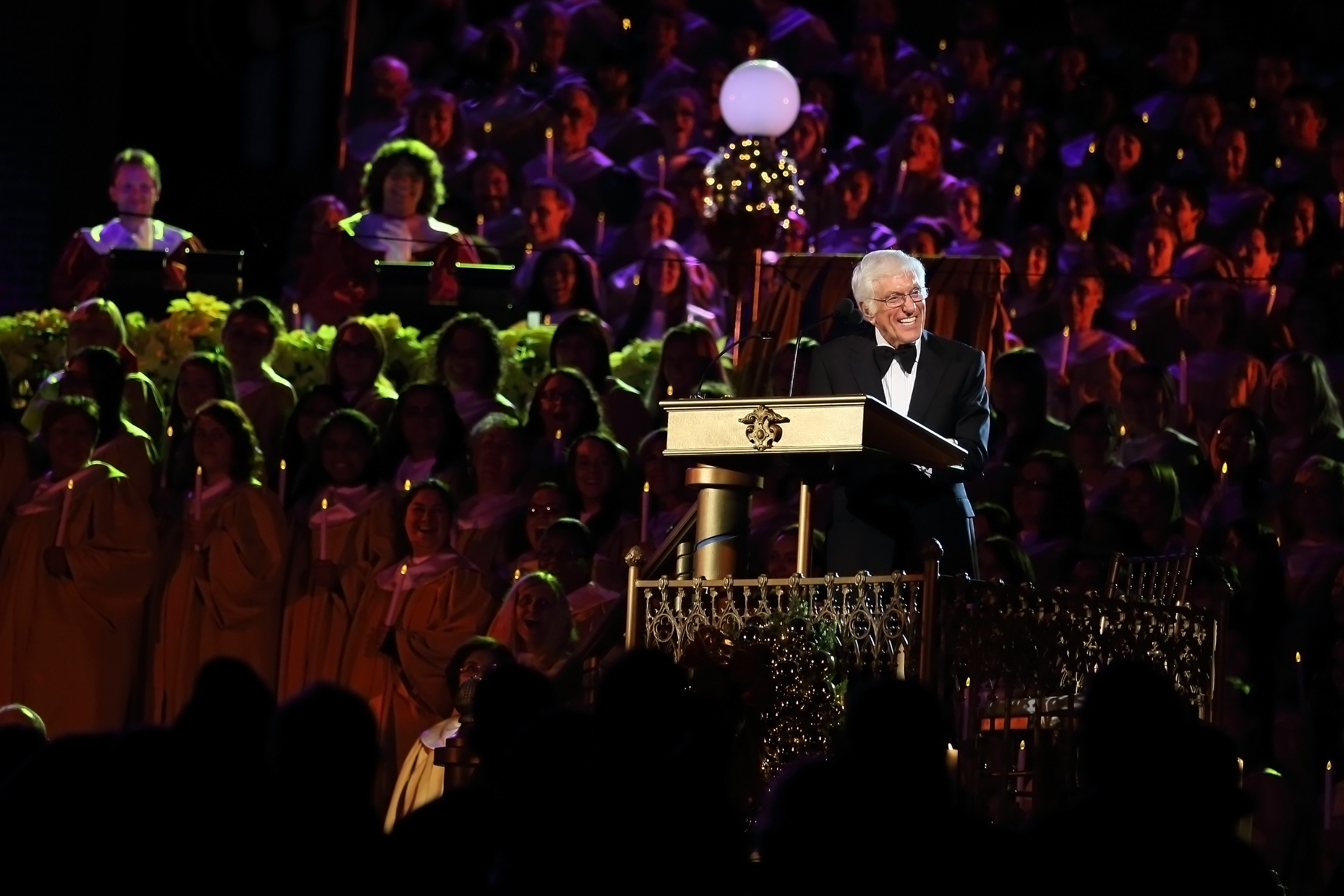
Dick Van Dyke narrating at Disneyland, 2012

In 1981, Alexander Encheff retired and the living Christmas tree was taken over by the newly-formed Disney Employee Choir the following year. The choir, which is made up of volunteer employees from all over The Walt Disney Company, still perform as the living Christmas tree to this day.

In 1998, the Candlelight Procession was moved to the Fantasyland Theatre at the northern edge of the park. It performed at that venue for the next four seasons, until it was moved back to Main Street Station for the 2003 edition.

Since its inception, Candlelight had been performed over a weekend during the holiday season at Disneyland with no more than two shows a night. In 2012, the park experimented with a multi-day format similar to that of Walt Disney World, complete with dining packages. 20 nights of two showings each were offered, however many were cancelled due to inclement weather. Tickets were all offered free of charge by lottery to Annual Passholders. The show returned to its traditional two-night schedule the following year.

In 2015, new music was recorded by the Disney Employee Choir to accompany the processional down Main Street.

=== Walt Disney World ===
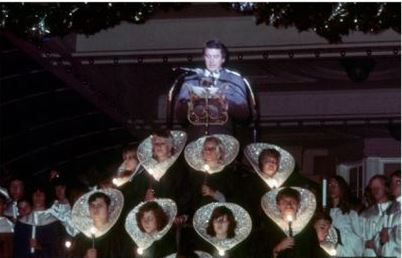
Rock Hudson narrating at Magic Kingdom as the star of "the living Christmas tree."

Walt Disney World opened in October 1971, and the Candlelight Procession was transferred over to the new Magic Kingdom theme park. Actor Rock Hudson served as the first narrator and Frederick Fennell was conductor of the Candlelight Orchestra. At the beginning, the event was staged in front of Cinderella Castle, and then alternated with Main Street Station, similar to the Disneyland version.

By the 1990s, the event at Walt Disney World was being performed over two days each holiday season, like Disneyland. In 1994, the event was moved to Epcot at the America Gardens Theatre in The American Adventure pavilion, to accommodate a larger viewership and growing popularity. James Earl Jones was the event's final narrator at Magic Kingdom, and Phylicia Rashad became the first narrator for the EPCOT version.

The show has been performed on both coasts annually, with the exception of 2020 when it was cancelled on both coasts due to the COVID-19 pandemic.

Derric Johnson became involved in the Candlelight Processional in the 1980s. Johnson had previously developed Re-Generation, a professional a-cappella singing group that performed nationally as well as at the Magic Kingdom during the 1970s. The group eventually evolved into the Voices of Liberty when EPCOT opened in 1982. Johnson, a composer, offered Disney his own custom arrangements of classic holiday songs, many of which were recorded for the Re-Generation Christmas recording Christmas in Velvet.

In 2022, Dr. John V. Sinclair, director of music at Rollins College, was honored for conducting over 1,000 performances of the Candlelight Processional at Walt Disney World.

== Event format ==
Each performance is narrated by a guest narrator, typically a celebrity, who has been previously affiliated with The Walt Disney Company. At Disneyland, the narrator of the event is kept secret until the day of the first performance, with two shows per evening for two nights only. Walt Disney World announces their narrator lineup ahead of time so guests can plan their vacations accordingly. Dining packages are also available to purchase that guarantee a seat inside the America Gardens Theatre at the American pavilion at EPCOT.

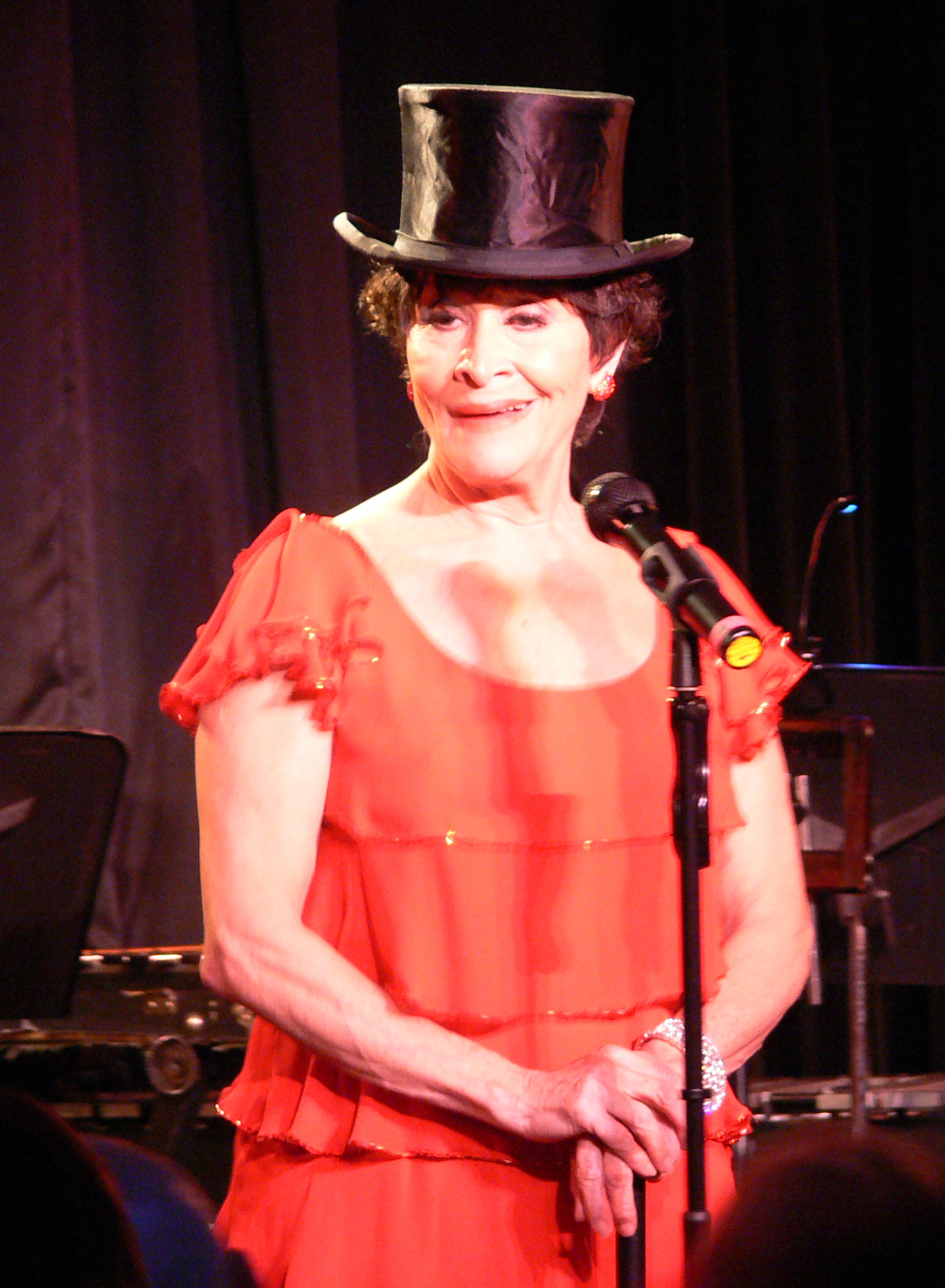
Chita Rivera narrated the event on multiple occasions at Walt Disney World.

The term "processional" refers to the choir entering one by one, typically wearing traditional choir robes, while holding a candle. The term "processing" refers to entering the stage, and "recessing" is the process of exiting the stage. Performers are lined up based on height and voice part (Soprano, Alto, Tenor, and Bass).

The event is one of the many seasonal entertainment offerings located at Epcot during the EPCOT International Festival of the Holidays. At Disneyland, the event is held on Main Street, U.S.A. with a stage setup around the train station in Town Square. At EPCOT, the Voices of Liberty are used in the show as featured singers and soloists.

The EPCOT version's signature song is "Rejoice with Exceeding Great Joy," music and lyrics by Lanny Wolfe. In the program, songs in different languages have been performed, including "Gesù bambino" (Italian), "Stille Nacht" (German and Spanish), "What Child Is This?" (Spanish), and "Il est né, le divin Enfant" (French).

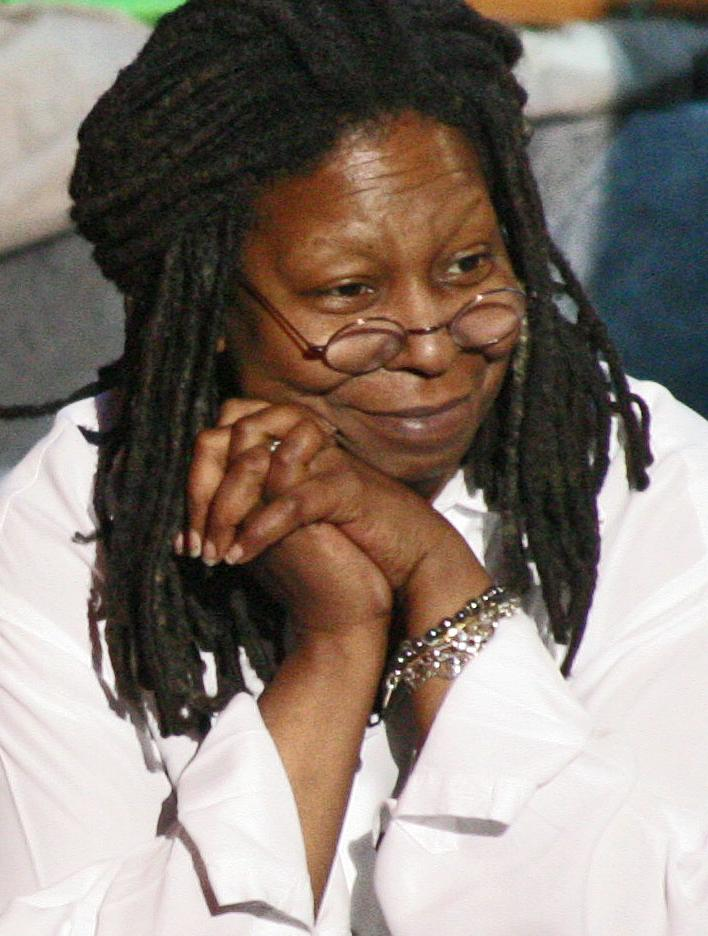
Whoopi Goldberg has been a frequent narrator at Walt Disney World.

The songs are custom composed and arranged for Disney to retell the nativity story, with orchestrations performed by a large orchestra. For several decades, the poem One Solitary Life by James Allan Francis was recited by the celebrity narrator, however this was cut from the program beginning with the 2013 season.

Disneyland musicians work under contracts with the Orange County Musicians Union, Local 7. Musicians in the orchestra in Florida are contracted through the Central Florida Local 389 chapter of the American Federation of Musicians union. The Disneyland version includes a handbell choir and both feature trumpet fanfares. The celebrity narrator tells the story in short passages mixed with songs. The show typically has stayed the same year to year, but it continues to be updated. It uses guest choirs, primarily youth choirs, referred to as a mass choir. The show is performed three times each night at EPCOT, with youth choirs performing in the first show and Disney Cast Members in the second following shows.

Disney Cast Members (employees) are selected to perform in the show based on auditions that are held prior in the year, with rehearsals being held weekly leading up to performance time, on a volunteer basis. Guest choirs also submit auditions and are selected to perform, traveling from around the country, although many are local school choirs located near the parks.

The event gives young performers the opportunity to perform in a large-scale professional setting, facilitated by Disney Imagination Campus. One of the longest running participant choirs since the 1970s at Disney World was Seminole High School from Sanford, Florida under the direction of Bob Maguire.

== Disneyland Candlelight Processional narrators ==
- 1960: Dennis Morgan
- 1961: Dennis Morgan
- 1962: Dennis Morgan and Gale Storm
- 1963: Dennis Morgan
- 1964: Dennis Morgan
- 1965: Dick Van Dyke
- 1966: Dennis Morgan
- 1967: Gregory Peck / Dean Jones
- 1968: Henry Fonda / Rock Hudson
- 1969: Cary Grant
- 1970: Charlton Heston / Dean Jones
- 1971: John Wayne / Steve Forrest
- 1972: Rock Hudson
- 1973: Cary Grant
- 1974: Cary Grant
- 1975: Jimmy Stewart
- 1976: Rock Hudson
- 1977: Buddy Ebsen / Ed Asner
- 1978: Cary Grant
- 1979: Elliott Gould / Joseph Cotten
- 1980: Michael Landon
- 1981: Ed Asner / Jason Robards
- 1982: Pat Boone and Shirley Boone
- 1983: Darren McGavin
- 1984: Joseph Campanella
- 1985: Kevin Dobson
- 1986: Craig T. Nelson / Elliott Gould
- 1987: Howard Keel
- 1988: Joseph Campanella
- 1989: John Forsythe
- 1990: James Earl Jones
- 1991: Robert Urich
- 1992: George Kennedy
- 1993: Michael York
- 1994: Peter Graves
- 1995: David Ogden Stiers
- 1996: Mary Hart
- 1997: Joseph Campanella
- 1998: Richard Crenna / Edward James Olmos
- 1999: Olympia Dukakis
- 2000: John Tesh / Barry Bostwick
- 2001: David Ogden Stiers
- 2002: Mickey Rooney / Stephen Collins
- 2003: Marie Osmond / Louis Gossett Jr.
- 2004: Marie Osmond
- 2005: Dick Van Dyke
- 2006: Hector Elizondo / Andy Garcia
- 2007: Jane Seymour
- 2008: John Stamos
- 2009: Jon Voight
- 2010: Tom Skerritt
- 2011: Gary Sinise
- 2012: Dennis Haysbert, Kurt Russell, Edward James Olmos, Lou Diamond Phillips, Dick Van Dyke, Patricia Heaton, Molly Ringwald, John Stamos
- 2013: Blair Underwood / Kurt Russell
- 2014: Beau Bridges
- 2015: Geena Davis / Lana Parrilla
- 2016: Ginnifer Goodwin
- 2017: Chris Hemsworth
- 2018: Chris Pratt
- 2019: Lin-Manuel Miranda
- 2021: Sterling K. Brown
- 2022: Viola Davis
- 2023: Brie Larson
- 2024: Kathryn Hahn
- 2025: Benjamin Bratt

== Magic Kingdom Candlelight Processional narrators (1971–1993) ==
- 1971: Rock Hudson
- 1972: Cary Grant
- 1973: Rock Hudson
- 1974: Rock Hudson
- 1975: Dean Jones
- 1976: Joseph Campanella
- 1977: Rock Hudson
- 1978: Ross Martin
- 1979: Perry Como
- 1980: Rock Hudson
- 1981: James Hampton / Darren McGavin
- 1982: Pat & Shirley Boone
- 1983: Joseph Campanella
- 1984: Rock Hudson
- 1985: Howard Keel
- 1986: Howard Keel
- 1987: Dean Jones
- 1988: Walter Cronkite
- 1989: McLean Stevenson
- 1990: Joseph Campanella
- 1991: George Kennedy
- 1992: Paula Zahn
- 1993: James Earl Jones

== EPCOT Candlelight Processional narrators (1994–present) ==
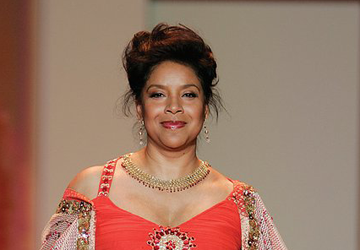
Phylicia Rashad was the first narrator at EPCOT in 1994.

- 1994: Robert Guillaume, Robert Urich, Phylicia Rashad
- 1995: Peter Graves, Phylicia Rashad, Louis Gossett Jr., Billy Dee Williams, Erik Estrada, E.G. Marshall
- 1996: Louis Gossett Jr., Buzz Aldrin, Barbara Eden, Sandi Patty, Ed Asner, Tara Holland, David Ogden Stiers, Joseph Marcell
- 1997: Paula Zahn, George Kennedy, Mary Hart, Angie Dickinson, Louis Gossett Jr., Pat Morita, Robert Urich, Sandi Patty, Dr. Bobby Jones
- 1998: Phylicia Rashad, Charles Kimbrough, Brian Dennehy, George Hamilton, Bruce Davison, James McDaniel, Joseph Marcell, Louis Gossett Jr., Deidre Hall, George Kennedy, Nicole Johnson, Art Garfunkel
- 1999: Alfre Woodard, Charles Kimbrough, Angela Bassett, Brian Dennehy, Robby Benson, James Avery, Edward James Olmos, James McDaniel, Andy Garcia, Sandi Patty, David Ogden Stiers
- 2000: Jodi Benson, Angela Bassett, Jon Secada, James Avery, Joe Mantegna, Ben Vereen, Ed Begley Jr., Phylicia Rashad, Robby Benson, Leeza Gibbons, Gary Sinise, LeVar Burton
- 2001: James Avery, Marlee Matlin, Robby Benson, Wayne Brady, Phylicia Rashad, Story Musgrave, Alfre Woodard, Blair Underwood, Gary Sinise, LeVar Burton
- 2002: John Tesh, Marlee Matlin, James Avery, Yolanda Adams, David Hartman, Collin Raye, Blair Underwood, Gary Sinise, Jodi Benson
- 2003: Andy Garcia, Ben Vereen, Rita Moreno, Ericka Dunlap, David Ogden Stiers, Steven Curtis Chapman, Edward James Olmos, Sandi Patty, Robby Benson, Gary Sinise
- 2004: Rita Moreno, Heather Headley, Kirk Franklin, Jim Caviezel, Marlee Matlin, Joshua Morrow, Eartha Kitt, Steven Curtis Chapman, Edward James Olmos, Gary Sinise, LeVar Burton
- 2005: Rita Moreno, Phil Donahue, Haley Joel Osment, Cicely Tyson, Jaci Velasquez, Eartha Kitt, Lou Diamond Phillips, Harry Hamlin, Marlee Matlin, Gary Sinise, Steven Curtis Chapman, John Stamos
- 2006: Rita Moreno, Marie Osmond, Steven Curtis Chapman, Kirk Cameron, Gary Sinise, Marlee Matlin, Brian Dennehy, Maureen McGovern, Mario Lopez, Cuba Gooding Jr.
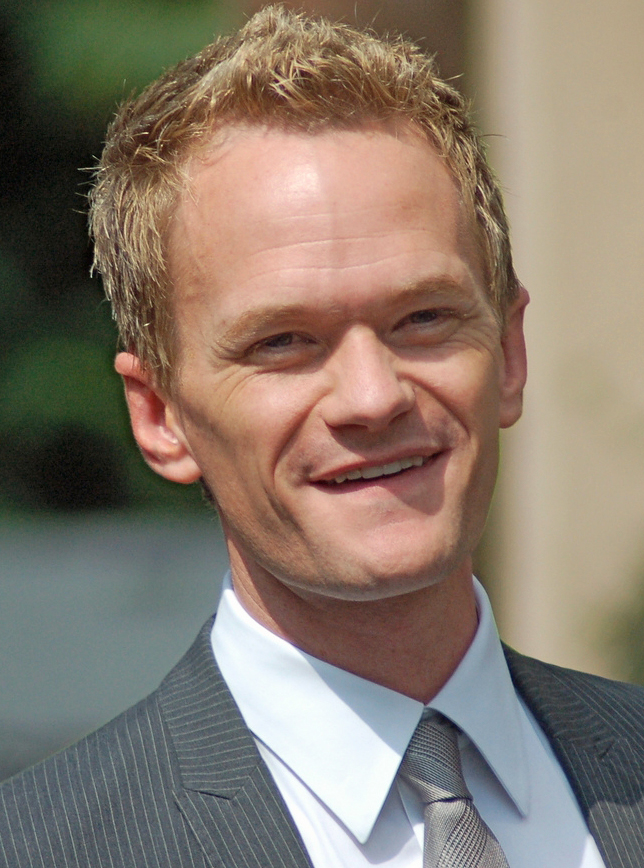
- Neil Patrick Harris has narrated at Walt Disney World on many occasions.
  2007: Andie MacDowell, Kirk Cameron, Monique Coleman, Marlee Matlin, Rita Moreno, Chita Rivera, Neil Patrick Harris, Steven Curtis Chapman, Gary Sinise, John O'Hurley, Edward James Olmos, David Robinson, Dennis Franz
- 2008: John O'Hurley, Neil Patrick Harris, Brian Stokes Mitchell, Virginia Madsen, Marlee Matlin, Monique Coleman, Abigail Breslin, Chita Rivera, Angela Bassett, Courtney B. Vance, Steven Curtis Chapman, Edward James Olmos
- 2009: Isabella Rossellini, John O’Hurley, Steven Curtis Chapman, Anika Noni Rose, Andy Garcia, Abigail Breslin, Brian Dennehy, Edward James Olmos, Angela Bassett, Courtney B. Vance, Whoopi Goldberg, Chita Rivera
- 2010: Isabella Rossellini, John O'Hurley, Corbin Bernsen, Susan Lucci, Jodi Benson, Whoopi Goldberg, Steven Curtis Chapman, Thomas Gibson, Trace Adkins, Brad Garrett, Marlee Matlin, Edward James Olmos
- 2011: Mira Sorvino, Geena Davis, Isabella Rossellini, Neil Patrick Harris, Chita Rivera, Marlee Matlin, Blair Underwood, Trace Adkins, Edward James Olmos, Susan Lucci, Michael W. Smith
- 2012: Geena Davis, Lea Salonga, Jodi Benson, Neil Patrick Harris, Whoopi Goldberg, Blair Underwood, James Denton, Alfre Woodard, Amy Grant, Gary Sinise, Trace Adkins, Andy Garcia, Marlee Matlin
- 2013: Gary Sinise, Neil Patrick Harris, Ashley Judd, Whoopi Goldberg, Sigourney Weaver, Dennis Haysbert, James Denton, Edward James Olmos, Trace Adkins, Steven Curtis Chapman, Blair Underwood, Amy Grant
- 2014: Jodi Benson, Neil Patrick Harris, Jonathan Groff, Whoopi Goldberg, LeVar Burton, Edward James Olmos, Joe Morton, Chita Rivera, Ana Gasteyer, Marlee Matlin, Isabella Rossellini, Blair Underwood, Steven Curtis Chapman
- 2015: Gary Sinise, Neil Patrick Harris, Whoopi Goldberg, Joe Morton, Ana Gasteyer, Meredith Viera, America Ferrera, Chandra Wilson, Daniel Dae Kim, Edward James Olmos, Blair Underwood, Amy Grant
- 2016: Steven Curtis Chapman, Neil Patrick Harris, Whoopi Goldberg, Edward James Olmos, Anthony Mackie, Robby Benson, Meredith Viera, Jim Caviezel, Joe Morton, Ming-Na Wen, Cal Ripken Jr., Jodi Benson
- 2017: Laurie Hernandez, Matt Bomer, Ana Gasteyer, Whoopi Goldberg, Pat Sajak, Jodi Benson, Jaci Velasquez, Warwick Davis, Chandra Wilson, Kurt Russell, CCH Pounder, Trace Adkins, Neil Patrick Harris
- 2018: Chita Rivera, Helen Hunt, Alfonso Ribeiro, Robby Benson, John Stamos, Neil Patrick Harris, Whoopi Goldberg, Bart Millard, Blair Underwood, Gary Sinise, Pat Sajak, Auli’i Cravalho, Joey Fatone, Cal Ripken Jr., Jodi Benson
- 2019: Ming-Na Wen, Neil Patrick Harris, Whoopi Goldberg, Isabella Rossellini, Alton Fitzgerald White, Gary Sinise, Pat Sajak, Geena Davis, Steven Curtis Chapman, Edward James Olmos, Marlee Matlin, Lisa Ling
- 2021: Auli’i Cravalho, Chita Rivera, Jodi Benson, Alton Fitzgerald White, Bart Millard, Lisa Ling, Andy Garcia, Ana Gasteyer, Blair Underwood, Pat Sajak, Courtney B. Vance, Steven Curtis Chapman
- 2022: Simu Liu, Chita Rivera, Raul Esparza, Daymond John, Josh Gad, Mariska Hargitay, Angela Bassett, Courtney B. Vance, Neil Patrick Harris, Whoopi Goldberg, Isabella Rossellini, Gloria Estefan, Marie Osmond, Cal Ripken Jr.
- 2023: Chrissy Metz, Luis Fonsi, Ann-Margret, Ashley Eckstein, Bart Millard, John Stamos, Neil Patrick Harris, Marlee Matlin, Brendan Fraser, Eva Longoria, Joey McIntyre, Sterling K. Brown, Jordan Fisher, Steven Curtis Chapman, Audra McDonald, Lisa Ling
- 2024: Josh Gad, Nico Santos, Chrissy Metz, Whoopi Goldberg, Titus Burgess, Brendan Fraser, Ralph Macchio, Gary Sinise, Neil Patrick Harris, Pat Sajak, Gloria Estefan, Edward James Olmos, Sterling K. Brown, Jodi Benson
- 2025: Constance Wu, Jordan Fisher, Susan Egan, Ashley Eckstein, Ralph Macchio, Leslie Uggams, Marlee Matlin, Henry Winkler, Lauren Daigle, Gary Sinise, Brendan Fraser, Luis Fonsi, Joel David Smallbone, Brie Larson, Sheryl Lee Ralph
- 2026: Gary Sinise, Benjamin Bratt, Whoopi Goldberg, Robin Roberts, Jason Kelce, Neil Patrick Harris, Josh Groban, Lauren Daigle, Ralph Macchio, Henry Winkler, Lacey Chabert, Jodi Benson, Simu Liu, Eva Longoria

== Audio recordings ==
The EPCOT Candlelight Processional was first recorded and released in 1997, with Louis Gossett Jr. as narrator. In 1999, the EPCOT Candlelight Processional was recorded again and released on Walt Disney Records cassette and CD with Phylicia Rashad as narrator.

Epcot Candlelight Processional 1999

Soundtrack album
- Genre: Soundtrack
- Length: 51:06
- Label: Walt Disney
- Producers: Ted Ricketts: Art Direction Steve Sterling; Conductors; Derric Johnson; John V. Sinclair; Narration; Phylicia Rashad

Track listing (songs performed)
No.	Title	Performer(s)	Length
1.	"Shout For Joy"	Candlelight Choir	1:04
2.	"O Come, All Ye Faithful"	Candlelight Choir	3:24
3.	"Il Est Né"	Candlelight Choir	2:09
4.	"O Holy Night"	Candlelight Choir	2:34
5.	"Angels from the Realms of Glory"	Candlelight Choir	2:04
6.	"Rejoice With Exceeding Great Joy / We Three Kings"	Candlelight Choir	3:48
7.	"What Child Is This?"	Candlelight Choir	2:34
8.	"Do You Hear What I Hear?"	Candlelight Choir	3:00
9.	"Silent Night"	Candlelight Choir	2:41
10.	"Joy to the World"	Candlelight Choir	2:13
11.	"The Hallelujah Chorus"	Candlelight Choir	3:51
12.	"The Wonderful World of Christmas"	Candlelight Choir	4:02
13.	"Away in a Manger"	Candlelight Choir	1:53
14.	"Angels We Have Heard on High"	Candlelight Choir	3:42
Total length:			51:06

== Filmed performances ==
In 1987, the Disneyland Candlelight Processional was recorded and released on VHS, with Howard Keel as narrator. This performance also aired on The Disney Channel. The performance was conducted by Sheldon Disrud. In 2018, the EPCOT Candlelight Processional was live-streamed on YouTube via the official Disney Parks channel, with Neil Patrick Harris as narrator.
