= 257th Army Band =

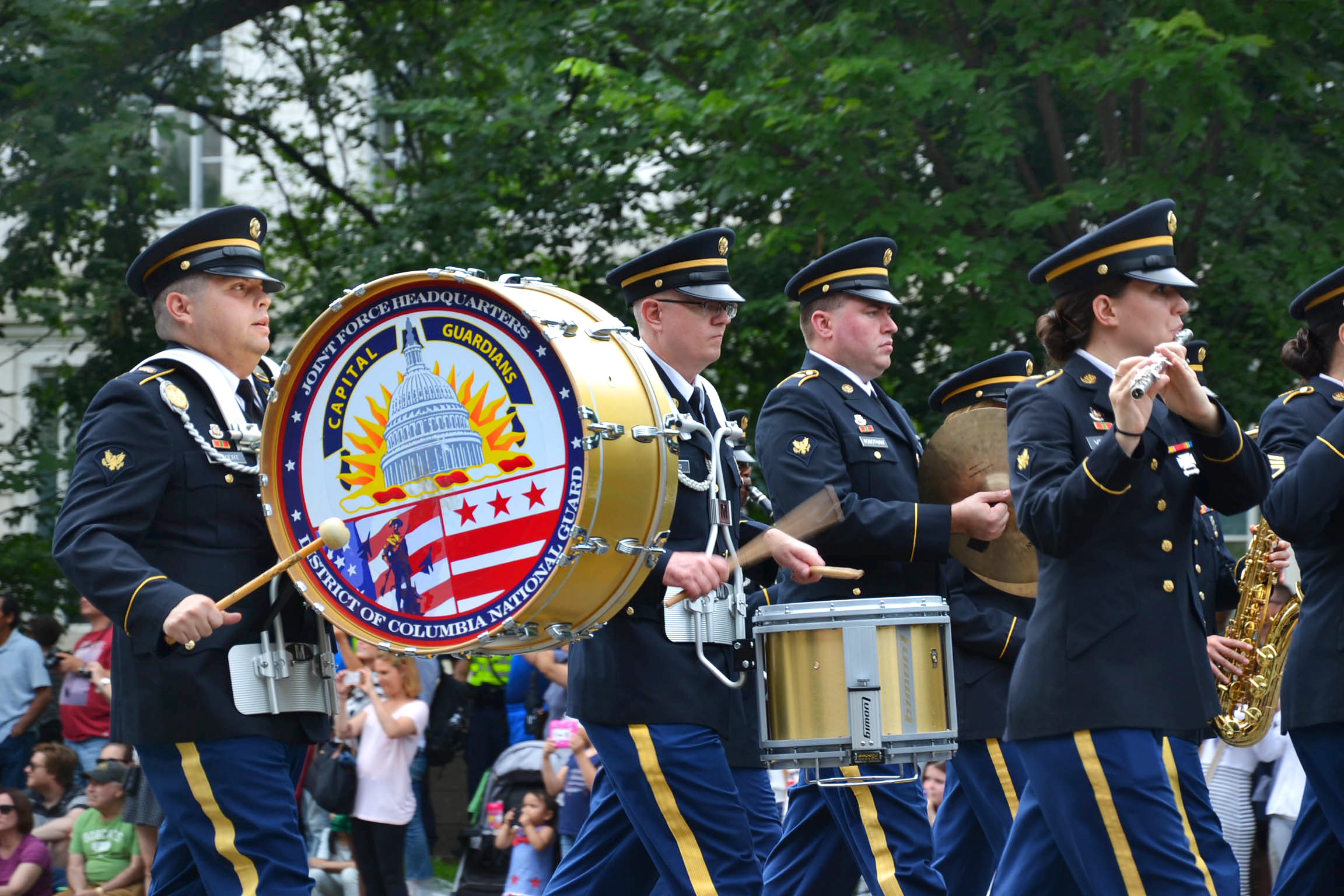
- The 257th Army Band during the National Independence Day Parade.
- Active: 1883 – Present
- Country: United States
- Branch: United States Army
- Type: military band
- Role: public duties
- Size: 45
- Part of: District of Columbia Army National Guard
- Garrison/HQ: Washington D.C.
- Nickname: The Band of the Nation's Capital

Commanders
- Commander: Chief Warrant Officer Daniel Wood
- First Sergeant: First Sergeant Brian Jones

The 257th Army Band, popularly known as the Band of the Nation's Capital, is a military band of the United States Army Reserve posted in the U.S. capital of Washington, serving as the principal band that is tasked for public duties within the capital city of the United States should the United States Army Band be unavailable. It is also considered to be the official musical ambassador for the District of Columbia Army National Guard of which it is a part of. The band operates under the command of Chief Warrant Officer Sheila Klotz, the director of all Army National Guard Bands, and First Sergeant Brian Jones, an assistant professor at George Mason University.

== Background ==
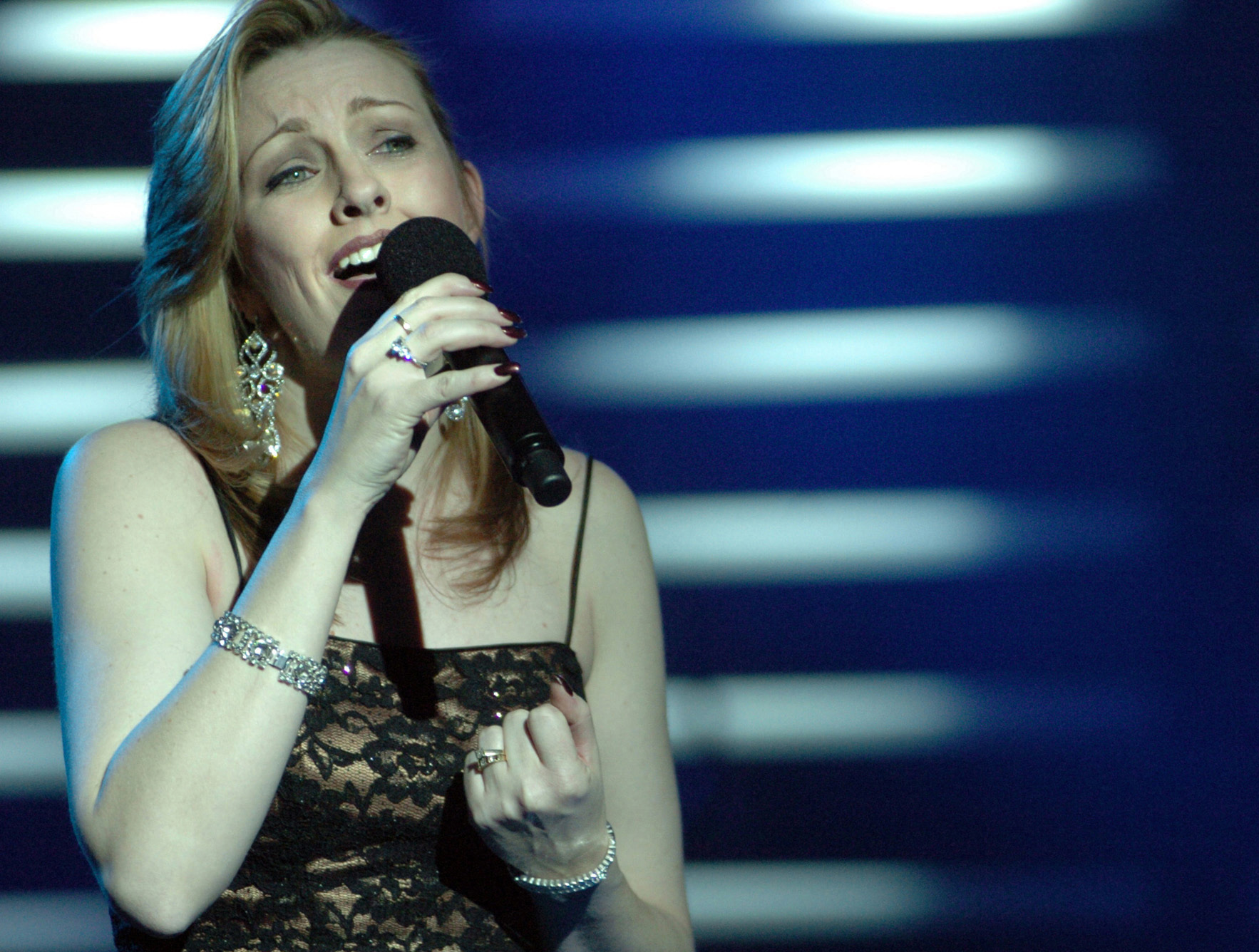
Vicki Golding, from the 257th Army Band, sings Barbra Streisand's “The Way We Were” during the 2006 Military Idol competition.

The 257th Army Band's history goes back to Corcoran Cadets militia which operated in D.C. in the 1800s. Through a series of mergers of that unit's band with other organizations with marching bands such as the 121st Engineers in 1921, and the 260th Coastal Artillery Unit in 1939, the band was consolidated in 1959 as the 91st Army Band in 1959, before getting its current name and title later on in the century. In 2005, Commander CW2 Sheila M. Klotz petitioned the Center of Military History to add, by virtue of the fact that the DCNG Band is the only military band belonging to the Nation's Capitol, with concurrence of Commanding General David F. Wherley, she submitted a memorandum requesting approval of the title "The Band of the Nation's Capitol" to the 257th Army Band, defining its uniqueness among the DC Military Bands. The memorandum was approved and the title remains a subsequent name of the unit.

== Traditions ==
The location of the band gives it the unique ability conduct performances for events of state and national importance, such as the United States presidential inauguration, the burial of the Unknown Soldier in 1921, and musical support for the state funerals of former presidents. Unlike the United States Army Band, which is a United States Premier Ensemble with official responsibilities, it primarily engages in events that help in the Army's relations with the community. Despite it being in the capital for most of the year, the band also on occasion conducts concert tours to states such as Texas, and countries such as Jamaica. Since 2003, then under the Command of Chief Warrant Officer Sheila M Klotz, the band takes part as the lead off unit in the National Independence Day Parade on Constitution Avenue, leading the joint honor guard platoons of the armed forces.

== Leadership ==
The following nine officers make up the leadership of the band:

- Band Commander: Chief Warrant Officer Daniel Wood
- Band First Sergeant: First Sergeant Brian Jones
- Brigadier Brass Team Leader: Sergeant First Class John Marcellus
- Readiness NCO: Staff Sergeant Eric Kuper
- Capital Sound Team Leader: Staff Sergeant Ronald Vazquez
- Capital Messengers Team Leader: Staff Sergeant Alisha Colema
- Training NCO: Sergeant Michael Smith
- Supply Sergeant: Sergeant Brandon Lebe
- Drum Major: Sergeant Andy Waiters

== See also ==
- U.S. Army Band
- U.S. military bands
