= Honor America Day =

Honor America Day was a rally put together by supporters of President Richard Nixon in 1970 to counter national outrage over the Cambodian invasion and the Kent State University killings. Co-chaired by Bob Hope, the rally took place in Washington, DC on July 4, 1970.

Billy Graham gave the keynote address:

"But I want to tell you it's tremendously heartening to see these thousands of people from all over the country, and it proves one thing, the railroads are still running. And we have telegrams from thousands of others who wished they could be with us, but they are still stacked up over the airport. That's one nice thing about America, you can get a crowd like this together even without a football game, and what a gathering. President Nixon saw this crowd and said 'My God, what did Agnew [Vice President Spiro Agnew] say now.' And Spiro looked out of his window, saw this crowd and said, 'My God, what a great time to say something.'"

Some people saw it as a political pro war rally and protested by jumping in the pool and chanting antiwar slogans.

A live album of the event, titled Proudly They Came...to Honor America was later released.

== See also ==
- Salute to America, a similar Independence Day rally and event organized by Donald Trump in 2019.
