= The American Adventure (Epcot) =

Pavilion of World Showcase in Epcot

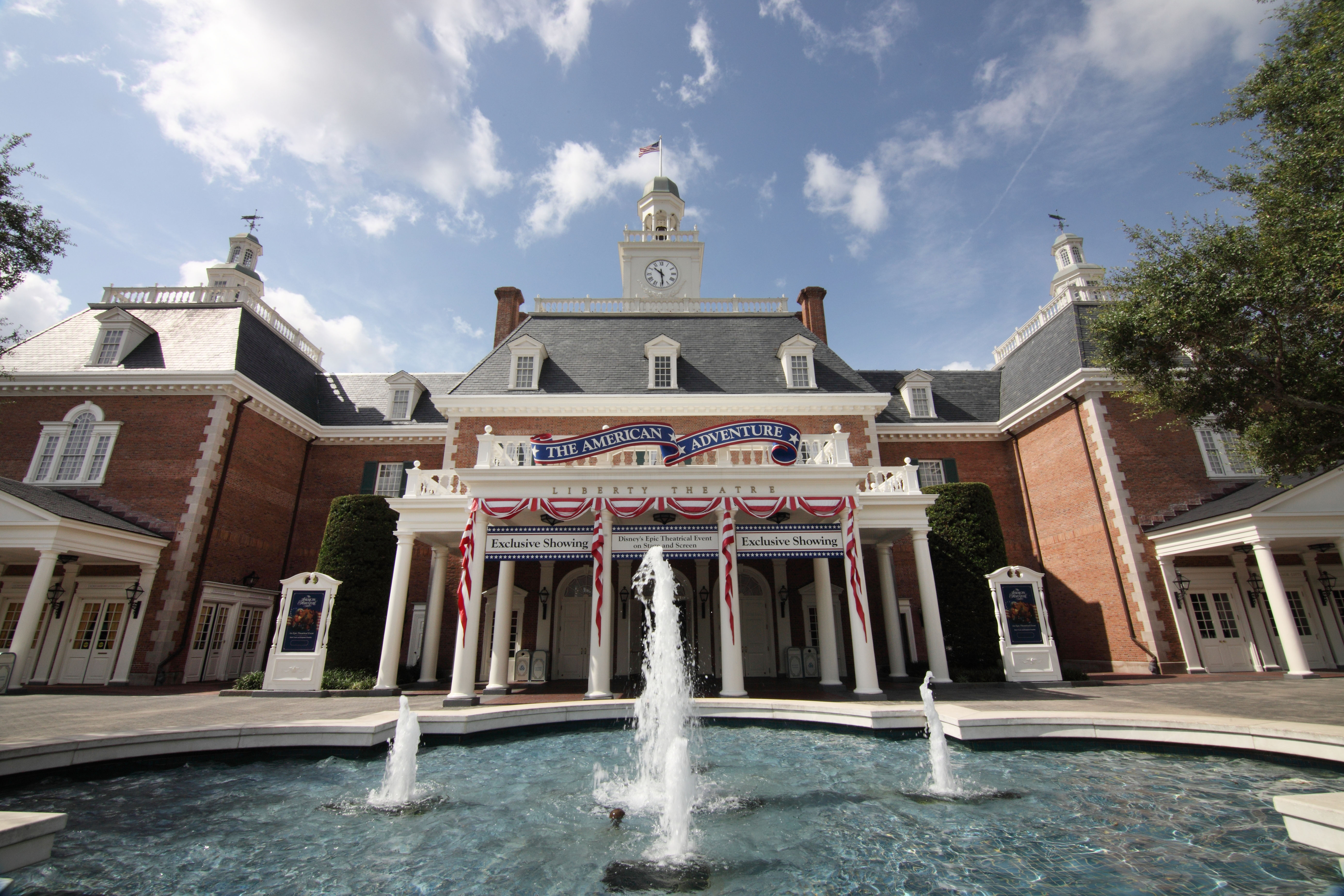
- The outer facade of the show building

EPCOT
- Area: World Showcase
- Coordinates: 28.367462°N 81.549454°W
- Status: Operating
- Opening date: October 1, 1982

Ride statistics
- Attraction type: Theater Show
- Designer: WED Enterprises
- Theme: Colonial American town
- Music: Golden Dream written by Robert Moline (music) & Randy Bright (lyrics)
- Audience capacity: 1024 per show
- Duration: 28:30
- Film director: Richard Benedict
- Hosts: Benjamin Franklin and Mark Twain
- Audio-animatronics: 35
- Sponsors: American Express (1982–2002) and Coca-Cola (1982–1998)
- Wheelchair accessible
- Assistive listening available

The American Adventure is the host pavilion of the World Showcase area of EPCOT at the Walt Disney World Resort near Orlando, Florida. It is also the name of the pavilion's main attraction, an Audio-Animatronic stage show of American history. It is located between the Italy and Japan pavilions.

The pavilion includes the Liberty Theater (home of the stage show), an exhibition space called the American Heritage Gallery, the America Gardens Theatre live entertainment venue, and a quick service food location named Regal Eagle Smokehouse—a Muppet-themed barbecue restaurant. Additionally, there is a merchandise location that houses the former Art of Disney store that was located in Future World.

== Layout ==
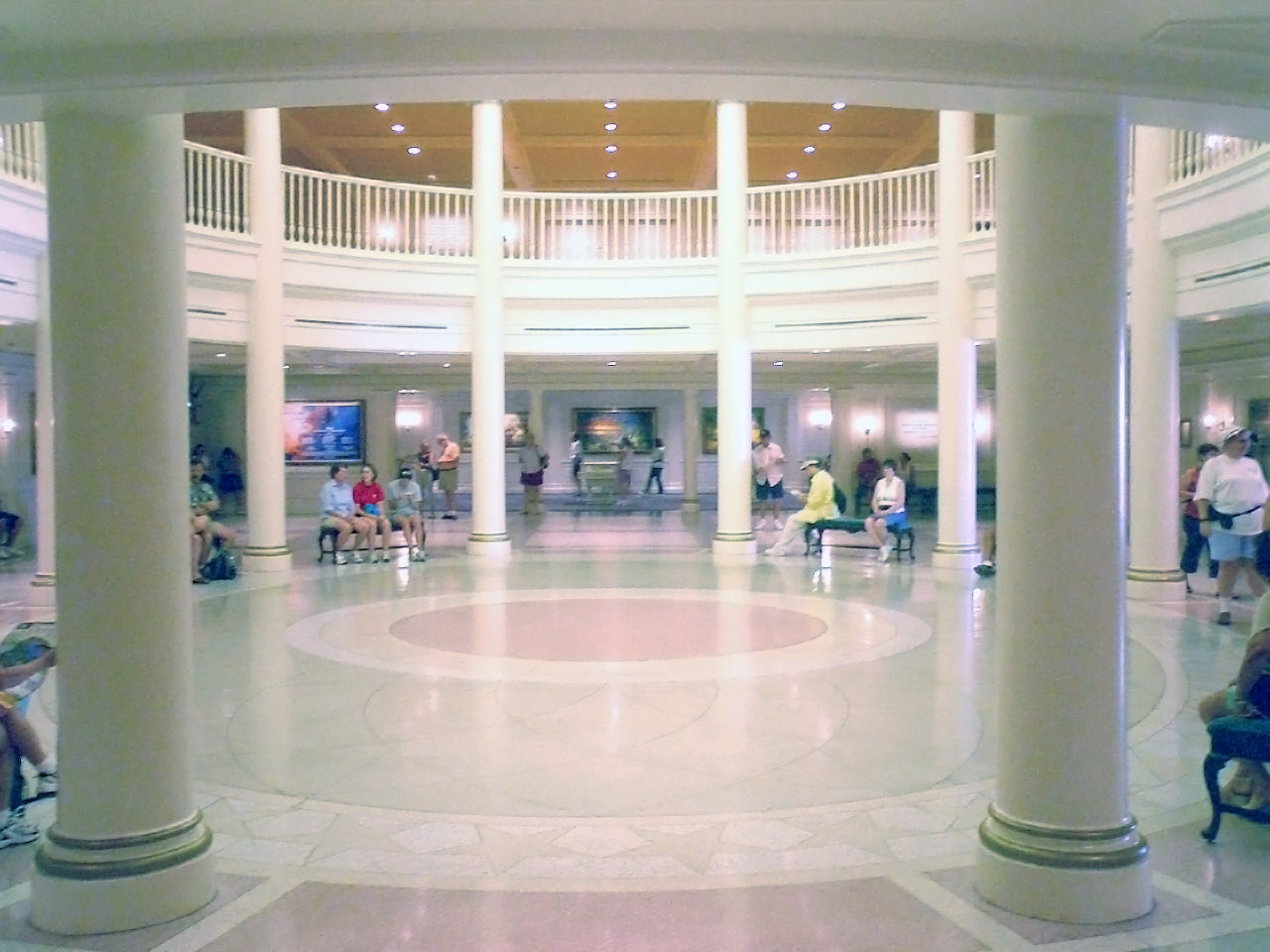
Inside The American Adventure preshow area

The pavilion is a single large building designed in the Colonial style. The building uses forced perspective to make a five-story building appear to be two and a half stories; there is a large ramp inside the attraction that slopes up, then down.

Its main attraction is The American Adventure show. The lobby is a square room that has an oval-shaped area in the middle with a dome-shaped ceiling. The walls contain quotes from famous Americans, including Walt Disney and Charles Lindbergh, and paintings of American life throughout history. The Hall of Flags exhibit, which guests pass on the way upstairs to the theater, is a display of the flags used throughout U.S. history. The upstairs lobby contains two more paintings of American life. The theater contains 12 statues, six on each side, that personify American values.

=== List of paintings ===
Title	Description
A Lesson for the Future	A teacher giving a lesson to her students outside, while men in the background build a school house
Building a Future Together	Construction workers building a skyscraper.
Compassion Knows No Boundary	A doctor and nurse treating sick people in another country
Defending Freedom	A factory making planes for the battle fields of World War II.
Election Day	Town's people gathered together to hear the election results
Giving Thanks	Family praying at the dinner table for their Thanksgiving meal.
Promise of America	Immigrants coming to America and see the Statue of Liberty.
Reaching for the Stars	A depiction of the many things happening at NASA's space program.
Seeds of Hope	Native American teaching the Plymouth Pilgrims how to plant corn.
Staying the Course	Two sailing ships out at sea.
Westward Ho	Several wagons crossing over a river, possibly the Mississippi River

=== List of statues ===
Spirit of	Personification
Adventure	Seaman
Compassion	Doctor
Discovery	Mountain man
Freedom	Pilgrim
Heritage	Native American woman, possibly Sacagawea
Independence	American Revolutionary soldier
Individualism	Cowboy
Innovation	African-American scientist, possibly George Washington Carver
Knowledge	School Teacher
Pioneering	Early aviation pilot, possibly Charles Lindbergh
Self-Reliance	Farmer
Tomorrow	Mother and child

== The American Adventure attraction ==
The American Adventure takes guests on a trip through America's history. It is narrated by Audio-Animatronic figures of Benjamin Franklin and Mark Twain (who lived almost 100 years apart) with the voices of Dallas McKennon as Benjamin Franklin and John Anderson as Mark Twain. The show is presented in a theater-like auditorium, with sets and characters rising out from the stage floor to represent scenes from different historical periods. The characters provide insight into American life of the past through conversations in which they discuss the current events of their time. Periods include the American Revolutionary War, the Civil War, the Centennial International Exhibition of 1876 (representing American industrialization), and the Great Depression. The presentation culminates with a musical film montage representing famous moments and people in American history from post-World War II to the present.

=== Changes ===
In 1993, the attraction received its second renovation, which added all new animatronics and a new version of the theme song, "Golden Dream". In mid-2007, about 45 seconds of footage were added to the end of the Golden Dreams montage, the first update since the 1993 renovation. Among the additions was brief footage of New York City Police Department/New York City Fire Department rescue crews after the September 11, 2001 attacks on the World Trade Center in 2001. In early 2018, as part of a third renovation, the Golden Dream montage and theme song were updated again to feature footage of more recent notable figures, including Barack and Michelle Obama, Mark Zuckerberg, Madonna, Michael Phelps, Simone Biles (alongside the Final Five), and Elon Musk, among others.

=== Songs ===
- "New World Bound" (lyrics by F. X. Atencio and Randy Bright, music by Buddy Baker)
- "In the Days of '76" (traditional)
- "Two Brothers" (lyrics and music by Irving Gordon, vocals by Ali Olmo)
- "Brother, Can You Spare a Dime?" (lyrics by E. Y. Harburg, music by Jay Gorney)
- "Golden Dream" (lyrics by Randy Bright with additional lyrics by Lynn Hart, music by Robert Moline, vocals by Richard Page and Siedah Garrett)

==== Theme song ====
The theme song for The American Adventure is "Golden Dream". The music was written by Robert Moline and the lyrics were written by show producer Randy Bright. Two versions of "Golden Dream" exist: the original version, arranged for choir and full orchestra by Don Mueller in 1980, and a 2018 updated version by producer Harvey Mason Jr., which is the arrangement heard today. When speaking of the project, Mason said his goal was to "be respectful of the original arrangement while making it contemporary and relevant to what's going on in music today." The song is featured most prominently at the end of the attraction, during the montage sequence of famous Americans. The song is also used as the finale to Disneyland's Great Moments with Mr. Lincoln.

The original version can be found on these releases:

- The Music of Disneyland, Walt Disney World and Epcot Center (1988)
- The Official Album of Disneyland and Walt Disney World (1991)
- The Music of Disney: A Legacy in Song (1992)
- Walt Disney World Resort: The Official Album (1999)

The 1993 version can be found on these releases:

- Walt Disney World Resort: Official Album (2000)
- Official Album: Walt Disney World Resort Celebrating 100 Years of Magic (2001)

The 2018 version can be found on iTunes.

=== Attraction voice cast ===
Actor	Role
Charles Aidman	Father ("Two Brothers")
John Anderson	Mark Twain, Franklin D. Roosevelt
Mic Bell	Banjo player ("Great Depression")
Dehl Berti	Chief Joseph
Bob Boyd	Theodore Roosevelt
Bill Boyles	Confederate brother ("Two Brothers")
Tricia Buttrill	Susan B. Anthony
Steve Cook	Matthew Brady
Robert Easton	Thomas Jefferson
Walker Edmiston	Andrew Carnegie, man in rocking chair ("Great Depression")
Al Fann	Frederick Douglass, apple salesman ("Great Depression")
Bob Holt	John Muir, store owner ("Great Depression")
Dallas McKennon	Benjamin Franklin, Continental Army soldier ("Valley Forge")
Claudette Nevins	Mother ("Two Brothers")
Patricia Parris	Jane ("World War II")
Joe Rohde	Alexander Graham Bell
Will Rogers Jr.	Will Rogers
Mark L. Taylor	Union brother ("Two Brothers")
Harvey Vernon	Sailor ("World War II")
B.J. Ward	Rosie ("World War II")
Frank Welker	Continental soldier ("Valley Forge"), additional voices

== The Voices of Liberty ==
The Voices of Liberty was founded by Derric Johnson and is a professional a cappella singing group that hosts patriotic choral performances in the pavilion rotunda throughout the day. The group also performs in year-round events including the Candlelight Processional. On select holidays, the group gives special performances called echo shows with additional singers. The group has performed for several U.S. presidents including Ronald Reagan and Jimmy Carter.

When recording or performing outside EPCOT, Voices of Liberty goes by the name Liberty Voices. Voices of Liberty evolved from a group called Re'Generation that sang a cappella at Magic Kingdom in the 1970s. The group has released several audio recordings of their music. Derric Johnson is the founder and director of the Voices of Liberty, Liberty Voices and Re'Generation, and the arranger of all of their music.

== America Gardens Theatre ==
Across from the pavilion is the America Gardens Theatre, an outdoor amphitheater. The America Gardens Theatre hosts concerts, singers, and bands from around the world.

The America Gardens Theatre has hosted numerous shows since it was built, including Blast! and Barrage. During the park's two major festivals—the International Flower and Garden Festival in the spring, and the International Food and Wine Festival in the fall—musical groups from the 1960s through the 1990s perform as part of each festival's concert series ("Garden Rocks" in the spring, and "Eat to the Beat" in the fall).

In 1999, a revised version of Michael Flatley's Lord of the Dance was performed in the theater over the summer. Although Flatley did not perform in the show, its popularity encouraged Epcot to bring the show back in 2000 for another summer run. The theater was originally designed as an open-air venue; partial cover and backstage dressing and show equipment areas were added during a refurbishment that was completed before the inception of the Magical World of Barbie stage show.

In April 2015, the American Music Machine a cappella group began performing at the America Gardens Theatre using music arranged by Glee's Tim Davis. The group stopped performing on September 29, 2017. Its captain, Antonio Fernandez, joined DCappella as its vocal percussionist when that group was founded in 2018.

=== Candlelight Processional ===
During the holiday season, the theater hosts the Candlelight Processional. This show is modeled on the show first performed at Disneyland in 1960, which was duplicated at the Magic Kingdom in 1971. The show relocated to the America Gardens Theatre in 1994. The show includes an orchestra and massed choir that perform traditional holiday songs while a guest celebrity retells the nativity story. Some of the celebrities who have taken part in the Processional over the years include Andy Garcia, John Stamos, Marlee Matlin, Edward James Olmos, Haley Joel Osment, Susan Lucci, John O'Hurley, Jim Caviezel, Neil Patrick Harris, Whoopi Goldberg, Jodi Benson, T.D. Jakes, Pat Sajak, and Heather Graham.

== See also ==
- EPCOT attraction and entertainment history
