= John V. Sinclair =

American orchestral conductor

John Vie Sinclair is an American conductor of orchestral and choral masterworks. He is the John M. Tiedtke Professor of Music and Department Chair of the Music Department at Rollins College, in Winter Park, Florida, where he has taught classes on Conducting, as well as a variety of other classes when needed such as Music History. He is the Artistic Director and Conductor of the Bach Festival Society of Winter Park.

== Early life and education ==
Sinclair earned his undergraduate degree from William Jewell College, and his master's and doctoral degrees from the Conservatory of Music at the University of Missouri in Kansas City.

== Career ==
Sinclair is a conductor of the Candlelight Processional at EPCOT and has conducted recordings for Warner Brothers, Walt Disney Corporation, the Moravian Music Foundation, and the Bach Festival Society.

Sinclair has received the Hugh F. McKean Award, Lifetime Achievement Award, Distinguished Service Award, and the Arthur Vining Davis Fellowship. He received a Citation for Achievement from his alma mater, William Jewell College.

In 2022, Sinclair was honored for conducting over 1,000 performances of the Disney's Candlelight Processional at Disney World.

== Recorded works as a conductor ==
- Candlelight Processional and Massed Choir As Presented At Epcot (1999)
- All Is Bright: A Choral Christmas (2013)
- Mozart Requiem by Bach Festival Society of Winter Park (2015)
- Pergolesi: Stabat Mater, P. 77 (2019)
- Music, Awake! Choral Music of Paul Moravec (2019)
