= Organ recital =

An organ recital is a concert at which music specially written for the organ is played.

The music played at such recitals is typically written for pipe organ, which includes church organs, theatre organs and symphonic organs (also known as concert organs). Increasing restoration of theatre and cinema organs (such as the Wurlitzers) also allows current performances of many pieces that can only be played on theatre organs.

== History ==
Recitals appear to have arisen from playing before and after religious services. In 19th-century synagogues, organs appeared before their use in services was allowed; instead their purpose was to give concerts before the sundown Shabat service. Sweelinck's duties included the giving of extra-liturgical concerts in Amsterdam's Oude Kerk.

== Logistics ==
Pipe organs are not, in general, portable instruments. The venues for organ recitals using those instruments are thus the churches, theatres, or halls where the organs are housed. Some instruments of about a century ago were built to be listened to while strolling, such as those at the Wanamaker department store in Philadelphia or the museum of San Francisco's Palace of the Legion of Honor, which is not heard to best advantage from any one spot.

However, with some organs the console is portable to a limited extent (such as, for example, being attached to a platform that can be raised or lowered, which is often the case for theatre organs, but less often the case for church organs, with some exception, like the Crystal Cathedral organ in California. Where this is the case, the console is moved for the recital so that the audience can see the organist playing.

== Notable venues and recitals ==
The Wanamaker Organ is played twice daily, Monday through Saturday, free of charge, for patrons and those who visit Macy's Department Store in the Wanamaker Building in Philadelphia. The Grand Court Organist is Peter Richard Conte, and when he is touring, assistant organists perform to ensure the organ is played every day.

The Dane and Polly Bales Organ Recital Hall at the University of Kansas was specifically constructed for organ recitals.

The Harvard Organ Society holds regular organ recitals at the Adolphus Busch Hall.

The Temple Square Organ Recitals show off the organs in and around Temple Square, including the Salt Lake Tabernacle organ (most often in the Tabernacle) others are the LDS Conference Center organ and the Salt Lake Assembly Hall organ (occasionally). During the summer: Monday through Saturday noon and 2 pm. Sunday 2 pm. Non-summer: Monday through Saturday noon, and Sunday at 2 pm.

To show off its new concert organ, the Walt Disney Concert Hall held a series of organ recitals in 2004 and 2005. There is now a regular season of organ recitals at the venue featuring famous classical organists from around the world.

In Hollywood, California, the historic El Capitan Theater (also owned by the Disney company) showcases its Wurlitzer Organ regularly before its scheduled shows and movie showings. Organ recitals preceding Disney shows usually consist of Disney Favorites and Show Tunes, but well-known theater organ greats occasionally visit to do special shows at the theater, such as Bob Ralston of Lawrence Welk fame. Mr. Ralston also hosts organ recitals at his home in Granada Hills.

Also in California, the Orange County Theater Organ Society hosts frequent theater organ recitals at the Plummer Auditorium in Fullerton, featuring its own original Wurlitzer pipe organ from 1930. As part of its season, some of these recital programs also include a silent film accompanied by the theater organ, to provide a complete experience the way it was originally intended. A long list of accomplished organists regularly frequent the Plummer, including Chris Elliot and the inimitable Bob Ralston.

While world-famous organist Frederick Swann was in residence at First Congregational Church in Los Angeles between 1998 and 2001, where he supervised the improvement of the organ to rival that of his former church, the Crystal Cathedral, to become the largest church organ in the world (with over 20,000 pipes), he instituted a music festival called "Organ Alive!" that featured organ recitals and concerts, collaborating with many renowned musicians to revive Los Angeles' organ music culture. The annual conference and organ series attracted people from all over the world to Los Angeles and continued in the years following Mr. Swann's retirement as principal organist of the church. Following the success of this recital series and the awareness that was revived in the city, two new significant pipe organs were commissioned in the city: that of the Disney Concert Hall and the Catholic Cathedral of Our Lady of the Angels (one block from Disney Hall).

The Los Angeles OLA Cathedral also holds weekly organ recitals on Wednesdays at 12:45 pm, following the noon mass. Follow the music link on the cathedral's website for details on artists and programs.

A performance of the complete organ works of Johann Sebastian Bach was held on November 22, 2014, at St. Peter's Lutheran Church in Manhattan. Twenty organists from The Juilliard School performed. Juilliard Organ Department Chair, Paul Jacobs, curated the eighteen-hour performance.

== See also ==
- List of organ pieces
