= Derric Johnson =

American orchestral conductor, composer, author

- Born: Derric Eilef Johnson; August 11, 1932 (age 94)
- Education: Azusa Pacific University
- Occupations: conductor, composer, author
- Spouse(s): Fay Woolard (divorced) Deborah Field (m. 1986)
- Children: 2
- Website: https://derricjohnson.com/

Derric Eilef Johnson (born August 11, 1932) is an American conductor, composer and author. He is best known for his choral music arrangements and his work in vocal pedagogy and music theory. He served as a creative consultant for Walt Disney World from 1973 until 2005, where during his tenure he created several entertainment offerings including Voices of Liberty.

Johnson is also the creator of the Armed Forces Medley, which he created for his Re'Generation group's album What Price Freedom in 1972. The medley has become a staple in Americana music and is often sung during patriotic holidays and events.

== Life and career ==
Johnson was raised in Indiana, the son of Evelyn (Engebretsen) and Eilef Johnson. His grandparents had immigrated to the United States from Norway. He has one younger brother, Ron. He graduated from Goshen High School, and then followed his families move to the west coast, attending college at Azusa Pacific University where he majored in biblical litergy with a minor in music. He also played football in high school and college. He spent his early years working in church ministry and music at Skyline Church in Lemon Grove, California, where he was mentored by pastor Orval Butcher.

Johnson is the founder of The New Sounds Acapalla Choir, the Re'Generation Acapella Choir, Kids of the Kingdom at the Magic Kingdom, and the Voices of Liberty at Epcot. He created The Glory and Pageantry of Christmas show at Downtown Disney (now Disney Springs) He also spent many years as the sole conductor of Disney's Candlelight Processional at EPCOT.

He has authored several books, focusing on motivational short stories and leadership topics. Johnson has an extension collection of original songs and compositions. His best known choral arrangements include his version of the American folk songs Shenandoah, Golden Dream, This Land Is Your Land, The Red White and Blue, Oh! Susanna, and You'll Never Walk Alone. He has been a conductor and producer on several albums including those for his groups he founded, Voices of Liberty and Re'Generation. He is a former artist-in-residence at George Fox University.

In 2026, Johnson was presented with The Founders Medal for Patriotism award by the Daughters of the Revolution.

== Select recordings ==
- Here's Help For Your Hope
- Christmas Is...Radio Shows
- Acapella Americana
- Acapella Classics
- Christmas in Velvet
- Christmas in Velvet Volume II
- Christmas in Velvet Volume III
- Christmas in Velvet Volume IIII

== Select books ==
- Thinkspots for Life
- Chips off the Butcher Block
- Easy Doesn't Do It
- I Didn't Know That
- The Wonder of America
- The Wonder of Christmas
- Life Lessons For Leaders
- Excellence is Never an Accident

== Stage musicals ==
- The Crimson Bridge
- I Promise To Love
- Ring All The Bells Of Freedom
- The Fourth Cross
- Beyond The Tomb
- Goin' Home
- Colors of Christmas
- Beyond The Manger
- Christmas....That's Why
- A Song, A Star, A Son
- Bethlehem....Everybody's Home Town
- Believe
