= National Memorial Day Concert =

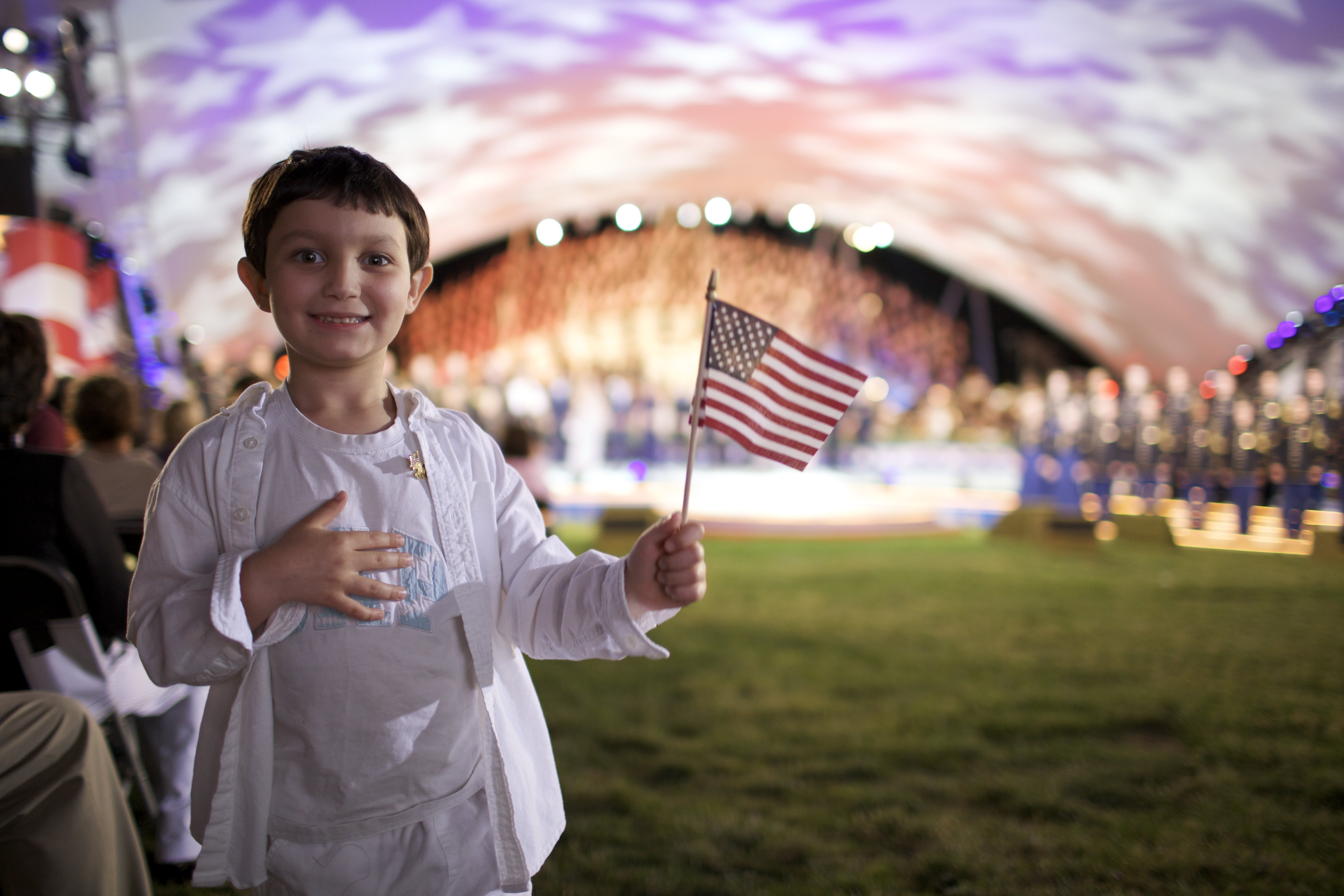
- A boy holding an American flag during the 2009 National Memorial Day Concert
- Created by: Jerry Colbert
- Directed by: Paul Miller
- Creative directors: Jerry Colbert (1989–2016); Michael Colbert (2017–present)
- Presented by: E. G. Marshall; Ossie Davis; Joe Mantegna; Gary Sinise; Laurence Fishburne; Mary McCormack; Esai Morales
- Opening theme: "The Star-Spangled Banner"
- Ending theme: Armed Forces Medley
- Country of origin: United States
- Original language: English

Production
- Executive producers: Jerry Colbert (1989–2016); Michael Colbert (2017–2019; 2022)
- Production locations: West Lawn of the United States Capitol; Washington, D.C., U.S. (1989–2019, 2022–present); Broadcast but not live (2020 and 2021)
- Running time: 90 minutes

Original release
- Network: PBS
- Release: May 28, 1989 – present

The National Memorial Day Concert is a free annual concert performed on the west lawn of the United States Capitol Building in Washington, D.C., in commemoration of Memorial Day since 1989. In 2020 and 2021, the concert was broadcast on PBS and streamed, but was not live, as a result of the COVID-19 pandemic. The concert was held on the fourth or last Sunday of May and on the same day that the Indianapolis 500 and the Coca-Cola 600 was held. It is broadcast on PBS, and can also be seen overseas by U.S. military personnel in more than 175 countries and aboard more than 200 U.S. Navy ships at sea on the American Forces Network. The concert is viewed and heard by millions across the country and the world, as well as, in every year but 2020 and 2021, attended by more than half a million people at the United States Capitol.

The concert usually begins with the American national anthem by a recording artist, accompanied by the National Symphony Orchestra and the U.S. Army Herald Trumpets, while the last line "and the home of the brave" was sung with a choir, followed by music and dramatic readings. The concert's finale begins with a performance of the Armed Forces Medley by the National Symphony Orchestra, accompanied by the U.S. Army Chorus, the U.S. Navy Band Sea Chanters, the U.S. Air Force Singing Sergeants, The Soldiers' Chorus of the United States Army Field Band, and the Quantico Marine Band vocalists, followed by closing remarks by the chairman of the Joint Chiefs of Staff. The 2020 and 2021 concerts were not live because of the ongoing COVID-19 pandemic and instead featured a series of pre-recorded performances and readings along with a tribute to first-responders helping out during the pandemic.

Since its premiere, the multi-award-winning television event has honored the military service of all the uniformed service personnel of the Armed Forces and by extension the National Guard Bureau and their families and those who have made the ultimate sacrifice for the republic and people since the American Revolutionary War.

== National Anthem performers ==
- 1992: United States Navy Sea Tenors, and the Army Chorus
- 2001: John McDermott
- 2007: Josh Turner
- 2010: Yolanda Adams
- 2011: Pia Toscano (sung a capella)
- 2012: Jessica Sanchez
- 2013: Candice Glover
- 2014: Caleb Johnson
- 2015: Nick Fradiani
- 2016: Trent Harmon
- 2017: Auliʻi Cravalho
- 2018: Spensha Baker
- 2019: Alyssa Raghu
- 2020: Christopher Jackson (sung a capella)
- 2021: Mickey Guyton
- 2022: Pia Toscano (2)
- 2023: Yolanda Adams (2)
- 2024: Ruthie Ann Miles
- 2025: Angel Blue
- 2026: Mickey Guyton (2)

== See also ==
- A Capitol Fourth
