= Armed Forces Medley =

American collection of marches

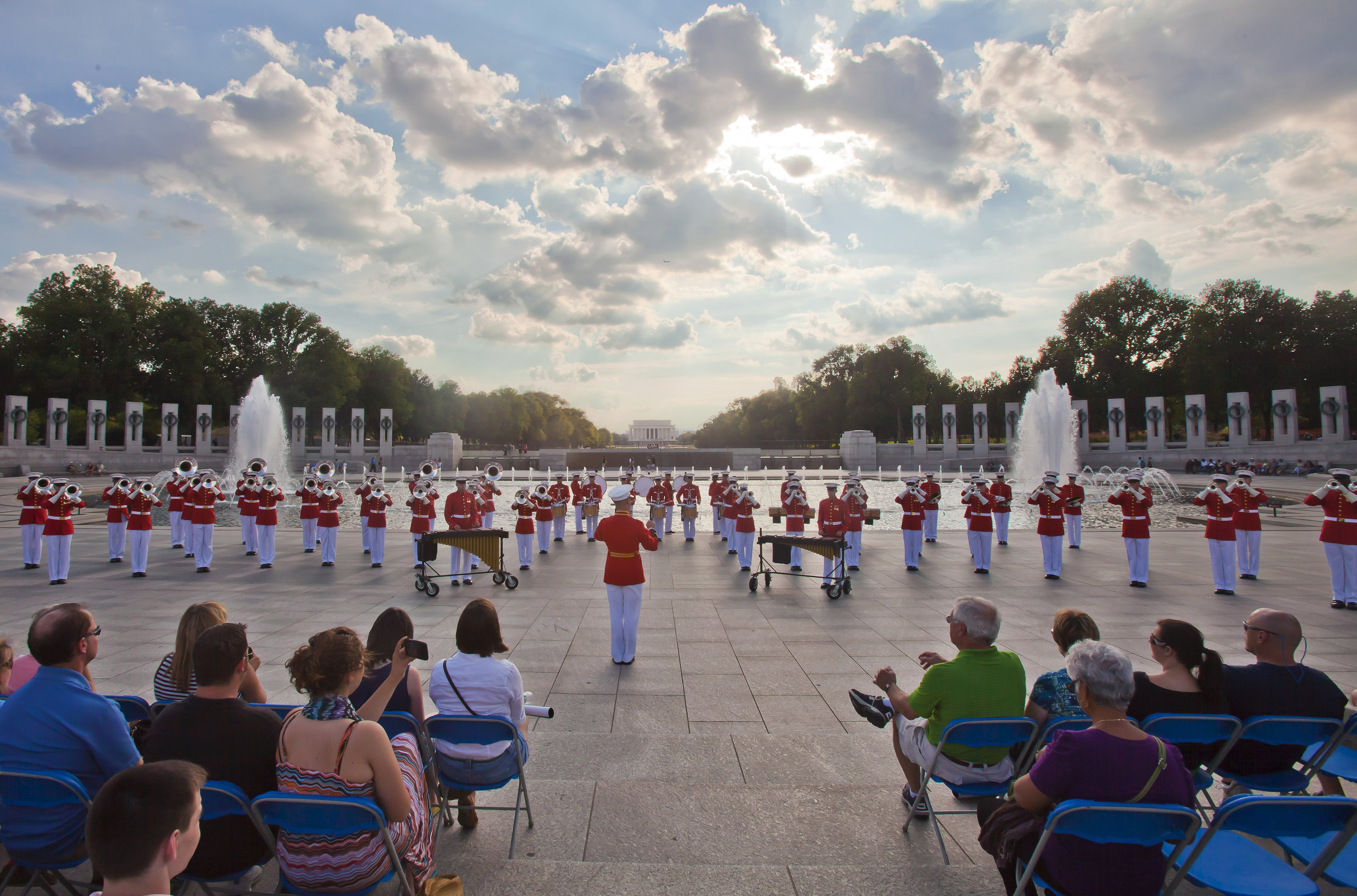
The United States Marine Drum and Bugle Corps performing the Armed Forces Medley at the Friends of the National World War II Memorial.

The Armed Forces Medley, also known as the Armed Forces Salute, is today recognized as a collection of the official marchpasts/songs of the 6 services of the United States Armed Forces: Army, Marine Corps, Navy, Air Force, Coast Guard, and Space Force. The medley is usually played in increasing order of precedence:

1. Semper Paratus
2. Semper Supra
3. The U.S. Air Force
4. Anchors Aweigh
5. Marines' Hymn
6. The Army Goes Rolling Along

In other circumstances, the medley is to be played in reverse order of precedence, starting with The Army Goes Rolling Along.

== Brief history ==
Derric Johnson was the creator of the first medley of US armed forces songs. He drew from only 4 services and ended his work with a characteristic grand finale "Army .. Navy.. Air Force .. Marines!", and titled the work 'Armed Forces Medley'. Commercially released in 1972, the medley was used extensively during the 1975/6 USA bicentennial celebrations and became known as a song in its own right, with the later addition of Semper Paratus ('Always Ready'), for the Coast Guard.

The Medley was first performed in public during the first National Memorial Day Concert in 1990 on the west lawn of the United States Capitol Building in the national capital, Washington, D.C., aired as in today by the PBS network and played for the first time by the National Symphony Orchestra, backed by a civil chorus and military choirs from the United States Armed Forces. In recent years, the medley has been followed by closing remarks by the Chairman of the Joint Chiefs of Staff. Since then the Medley was always sung during the concert's finale and has become a common fixture in many band and orchestra concerts within the United States as a way to honor the active servicemen and women, reservists and veterans of the Armed Forces and the National Guard Bureau. The Medley was performed at the 2019 Salute to America event, an Independence Day event at the National Mall. The Medley was also played at the July 4th, 2020 Second Salute to America event (that took place at the South Lawn of the White House). This time it included the Space Force Hymn. Semper Supra was formally included into the Medley during the 2023 NMDC. In 2025, the medley was sung by The Joint Armed Forces Chorus during the A Capitol Fourth.
