= National Independence Day Parade =

Annual parade in Washington DC

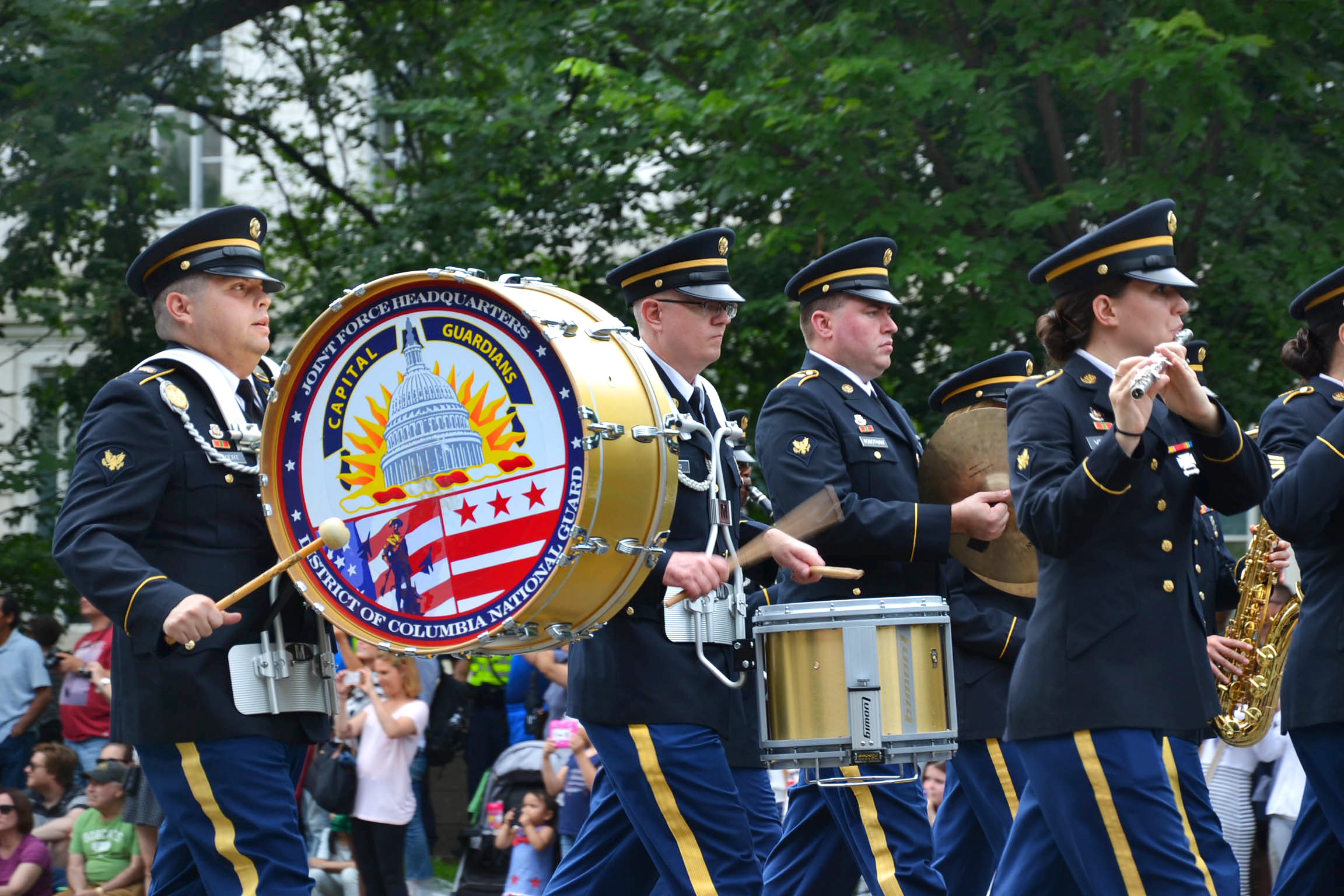
The 257th Army Band at the 2015 parade.

The 2019 parade.

The National Independence Day Parade is the official July 4th Parade of the United States and is an annual parade held on Independence Day in Washington, D.C. It takes place on Constitution Avenue passing along the National Mall, and is sponsored and co-produced by Music Celebrations International and the National Park Service,

It features various military performers, contingents and invited guests, including invited bands and units from every branch of the U.S. Military, the Old Guard Fife and Drum Corps, the joint-service honor guard battalion of the Joint Force Headquarters National Capital Region, officers of the Metropolitan Police Department of the District of Columbia, and representatives of the foreign expatriate communities. It also includes nominated representatives of the high schools and colleges and cultural groups inside the DCPS and from each of the 50 states, Puerto Rico, and overseas territories.

The parade was canceled in 2020 and 2021 due to COVID-19. In 2026, it was canceled due to extreme heat.
