= The WQXR All-Day Bach Organ Marathon =

Marathon performance of Johann Sebastian Bach's organ works

Bach Organ Marathon
- Genre: Baroque, Bach
- Dates: November 22, 2014
- Locations: St. Peter Lutheran Church, NYC

The WQXR All-Day Bach Organ Marathon was a marathon performance of the nearly complete organ works of Johann Sebastian Bach, hosted by WQXR-FM. The series of recitals was held at St. Peter Lutheran Church in Manhattan from 7:00 A.M. on November 22, 2014, to 1:00 A.M the next day. The organ was built in 1978 by Klais Orgelbau. Grammy-winning Juilliard professor and department chair, Paul Jacobs, curated the event. The works were divided among Jacobs, eighteen of his Juilliard students (including alumni), and Juilliard faculty member (and alumnus) David Enlow. Fourteen recitals consisted of over 150 preludes (fantasias, toccatas), fugues, chorales, concerti, and other forms.

== Media ==
The organ marathon received attention on Facebook and Twitter through the use of hashtags #bachstock and #bachathon. The marathon was featured in articles online and in print by The Wall Street Journal, The New Yorker, and The New York Times, as well as several others.

== Performers ==
- David Ball
- Chelsea Chen*
- David Crean*
- Isabelle Demers*
- David Enlow, Juilliard faculty*
- Daniel Ficarri
- Michael Hey*
- Christopher Houlihan*
- Ryan Jackson*
- Paul Jacobs, Chair, Juilliard Organ Department
- Ryan Kennedy
- Yinying Luo
- Colin MacKnight
- Griffin McMahon
- Raymond Nagem
- Alexander Pattavina
- Benjamin Sheen*
- James Wetzel*
- Janet Yieh
- Gregory Zelek

Juilliard alumni (at the time of performance)*

== Program ==
Time	Organist	Program
7:00am	David Crean	Prelude and Fugue in G minor, BWV 535; Allein Gott in der Höh, BWV 715; Allein Gott in der Höh, BWV 717; Allein Gott in der Höh, BWV 716; Herr Jesu Christ, dich zu uns wend, BWV 709; Partita on "Ach, was soll..." BWV 770; Prelude in G major, BWV 568; Pastorale, BWV 590; Ach Gott und Herr, BWV 714; Christ lag in Todesbanden, BWV 718; Wir Christenleut, BWV 710; Der Tag, der ist so freudenreich, BWV 719; Ein feste Burg, BWV 720; Prelude and Fugue in G major, BWV 550
8:15am	James Wetzel	Prelude and Fugue in C major, BWV 531; Liebster Jesu, wir sind hier, BWV 730; Gott, durch deine Güte, BWV 724; Gelobet seist du, Jesu Christ, BWV 722; Lobt Gott, ihr Christen, allzugleich, BWV 732; In dulci jubilo, BWV 729; Wie schön leuchtet der Morgenstern, BWV 739; Concerto in C major, BWV 594; Erbarm dich mein, o Herre Gott, BWV 721; Herzlich tut mich verlangen, BWV 727; Jesus, meine Zuversicht, BWV 728; Alla Breve, BWV 589; Liebster Jesu, wir sind hier, BWV 731 ‘Little’ Fugue in G minor, BWV 578
9:30am	Raymond Nagem	Prelude and Fugue in G major, BWV 541; Komm, heiliger Geist, BWV 651 & BWV 652; Christum wir sollen loben schon, BWV 696; Gelobet seist du, Jesu Christ, BWV 697; Herr Christ, der ein'ge Gottes-Sohn, BWV 698; Vom Himmel hoch, da komm' ich her, BWV 700; Vom Himmel hoch, da komm' ich her, BWV 701; Trio in D minor, BWV 583; Meine Seele erhebt den Herrn, BWV 733; Komm, Gott Schöpfer, heiliger Geist, BWV 667; Vor deinen Thron tret' ich hiermit, BWV 668; Toccata and Fugue in D minor (Dorian), BWV 538
10:45am	Yinying Luo	Vater unser im Himmelreich, BWV 737; Trio Sonata in E♭, BWV 525; Prelude and Fugue in C major, BWV 545
10:45am	Colin MacKnight	Mit Fried' und Freud' ich fahr' dahin, BWV 616; Herr Gott, nun schleuß den Himmel auf, BWV 617; O Lamm Gottes, unschuldig, BWV 618; Christe, du Lamm Gottes, BWV 619; Christus, der uns selig macht, BWV 620; Prelude and Fugue in A minor, BWV 543
10:45am	Janet Yieh	In dich hab' ich gehoffet, Herr, BWV 640; Wenn wir in hoechsten Nothen sein, BWV 641; Wer nur den lieben Gott laesst walten, BWV 642; Alle Menschen mussen sterben, BWV 643; Ach wie nichtig, ach wie fluechtig, BWV 644; Prelude and Fugue in C minor, BWV 546
12:00pm	Chelsea Chen	Toccata, Adagio, and Fugue, BWV 564; An Wasserflüssen Babylon, BWV 653; Schmücke dich, o liebe Seele, BWV 654 'Legrenzi' Fugue in C minor, BWV 574; Allein Gott in der Hoeh' sei Her, BWV 711; In dich hab' ich gehoffet, Herr, BWV 712; Jesu meine Freude (Fantasia), BWV 713; Trio Sonata in E minor, BWV 528; O Mensch, bewein' dein' Suende gross, BWV 622; Prelude and Fugue in D major, BWV 532
1:15pm	Ryan Jackson	Prelude and Fugue in C minor, BWV 549; Herr Jesu Christ, dich zu uns wend, BWV 655; Nun danket alle Gott, BWV 657; Fantasia in B minor, BWV 563 'Gigue' Fugue, BWV 577; Nun komm, der Heiden Heiland, BWV 599; Gott, durch deine Guete, BWV 600; Herr Christ, der ein'ge Gottes-Sohn, BWV 601; Lob sei dem allmaechtigen Gott, BWV 602; Puer natus in Bethlehem, BWV 603; Gelobet seist du, Jesu Christ, BWV 604; Der Tag, der ist so freudenreich, BWV 605; Vom Himmel hoch, da komm'ich her, BWV 606; Vom Himmel kam der Engel Schaar, BWV 607; In dulci jubilo, BWV 608; Lobt Gott, ihr Christen allzugleich, BWV 609; Jesu, mein Freud, BWV 610; Partita: O Christ, der bist der helle Tag, BWV 766; Concerto in A minor, BWV 593
2:30pm	Benjamin Sheen	Prelude in E♭, BWV 552a Kyrie, Gott Vater in Ewigkeit, BWV 669; Christe, aller Welt Trost, BWV 670; Kyrie, Gott heiliger Geist, BWV 671; Kyrie, Gott Vater in Ewigkeit, BWV 672; Christe, aller Welt Trost, BWV 673; Kyrie, Gott heiliger Geist, BWV 674; Allein Gott in der Hoeh' sei Her, BWV 675; Allein Gott in der Hoeh' sei Her, BWV 676; Allein Gott in der Hoeh' sei Her, BWV 677; Dies sind die heilgen zehn Gebot, BWV 678; Dies sind die heilgen zehn Gebot, BWV 679; Wir glauben all' an einen Gott, BWV 680; Wir glauben all' an einen Gott, BWV 681; Vater unser Himmelreich, BWV 682; Vater unser im Himmelreich, BWV 683; Christ, unser Herr, zum Jordan kam, BWV 684; Christ, unser Herr, zum Jordan kam, BWV 685; Aus tiefer Not schrei ich zu dir, BWV 686; Aus tiefer Not schrei ich zu dir, BWV 687; Jesus Christus unser Heiland, der von uns den Zorn Gottes wandt, BWV 688; Jesus Christus unser Heiland, BWV 689; Duet BWV 802; Duet BWV 803; Duet BWV 804; Duet BWV 805; Fugue in E♭, BWV 552b
4:15pm	David Ball	Prelude and Fugue in B minor, BWV 544; Liebster Jesu, wir sind hier, BWV 633; Liebster Jesu, wir sind hier, BWV 634; Dies sind die heil'gen zehn Gebot', BWV 635; Vater unser im Himmelreich, BWV 636; Durch Adam's Fall ist ganz verderbt, BWV 637; Es ist das Heil uns kommen her, BWV 638
4:15pm	Daniel Ficarri	Da Jesus an dem Kreuze stund', BWV 621; Wir danken dir, Herr Jesu Christ, BWV 623; Christ lag in Todesbanden, BWV 625; Prelude and Fugue in E minor, BWV 533 (The "Cathedral"); Wachet auf, ruft uns die Stimme, BWV 645; Woll soll ich fliehen hin, BWV 646; Wer nur den lieben Gott laesst walten, BWV 647
4:15pm	Griffin McMahon	Hilf Gott, dass mir's gelinge, BWV 624; Jesus Christus, unser Heiland, BWV 626; Herr Jesu Christ, dich zu uns wend', BWV 632; Concerto in D minor, BWV 596
5:30pm	Isabelle Demers	Sei gegrusset, BWV 768; Prelude and Fugue in A minor, BWV 551; Allein Gott in der Höh' sei Ehr', BWV 662; Allein Gott in der Höh' sei Ehr', BWV 663; Allein Gott in der Höh' sei Ehr', BWV 664; Fantasy in C minor, BWV 562; Fugue in C minor, BWV 575; Canonic Variations, BWV 769
6:45pm	David Enlow	Toccata and Fugue in F major, BWV 540; Trio Sonata in C minor, BWV 526; Jesu Christus unser Heiland, BWV 665; Jesus Christus unser Heiland, BWV 666; Canzona in D minor, BWV 588; Prelude and Fugue in A major, BWV 536; Das Jesulein soll doch mein Trost, BWV 702; Gottes Sohn ist kommen, BWV 703; Lob sei dem allmaechtigen Gott, BWV 704; Durch Adams Fall ist ganz verderbt, BWV 705; Liebster Jesu, wir sind hier, BWV 706; Piece d'orgue BWV 572
8:00pm	Paul Jacobs	Toccata and Fugue in D minor, BWV 565; Chorale-Prelude: Von Gott will ich nicht lassen, BWV 658; Trio Sonata in C major, BWV 529; Prelude and Fugue in D minor, BWV 539 (The "Fiddle"); Prelude and Fugue in C major, BWV 547; Prelude and Fugue in E minor, BWV 548 (The "Wedge")
9:15pm	Christopher Houlihan	Prelude and Fugue in F minor, BWV 534 'Corelli' Fugue in B minor, BWV 579; O Lamm Gottes, unschuldig, BWV 656; Trio Sonata in G major, BWV 530; Prelude in A minor, BWV 569; Wer nur den lieben Gott lasst walten, BWV 690; Wer nun den lieben Gott lasst walten, BWV 691; Wo soll ich fliehen hin, BWV 694; Christ lag in Todes Banden, BWV 695; Passacaglia in C minor, BWV 582
10:30pm	Michael Hey	Concerto in G major, BWV 592; Nun komm, der Heiden Heiland, BWV 659; Nun komm, der Heiden Heiland, BWV 660; Nun komm, der Heiden Heiland, BWV 661; Partita: O Gott, du frommer Gott, BWV 767; Nun freut euch, lieben Christen/ Es ist gewisslich an der Zeit, BWV 734; Valet will ich dir geben, BWV 735; Valet will ich dir geben, BWV 736; Von Himmel hoch, da komm' ich her, BWV 738; Ach, was ist doch unser Leben, BWV 743; Christus, der uns selig macht, BWV 747; Prelude and Fugue in E major, BWV 566
11:45pm	Ryan Kennedy	Concerto in C major, BWV 595; Ach Herr, mich armen Sunder, BWV 742; Liebster Jesu, wir sind hier, BWV 754; Nun freut euch, lieben Christen, BWV 755; O herre Gott, din goettlich's Wort, BWV 757; Meine Seele erhebt den Herren, BWV 648; Ach bleib bei uns, Herr Jesu Christ, BWV 649; Kommst du nun, Jesu, von Himmel herunter, BWV 650
11:45 P.M.	Alexander Pattavina	Christum wir sollen loben schon, BWV 611; Wir Christenleut', BWV 612; Helft mir Gottes Güte preisen, BWV 613; Das alte Jahre vergangen ist, BWV 614; In dir ist Freude, BWV 615; Fantasy and Fugue in C minor, BWV 537
11:45 P.M.	Gregory Zelek	Trio Sonata in D minor, BWV 527; Fantasy and Fugue in G minor, BWV 542 (The "Great")

== See also ==
- List of Bach festivals
- List of early music festivals
- List of Bach's organ compositions
- Description of Bach's organ compositions
