= White House COVID-19 outbreak =

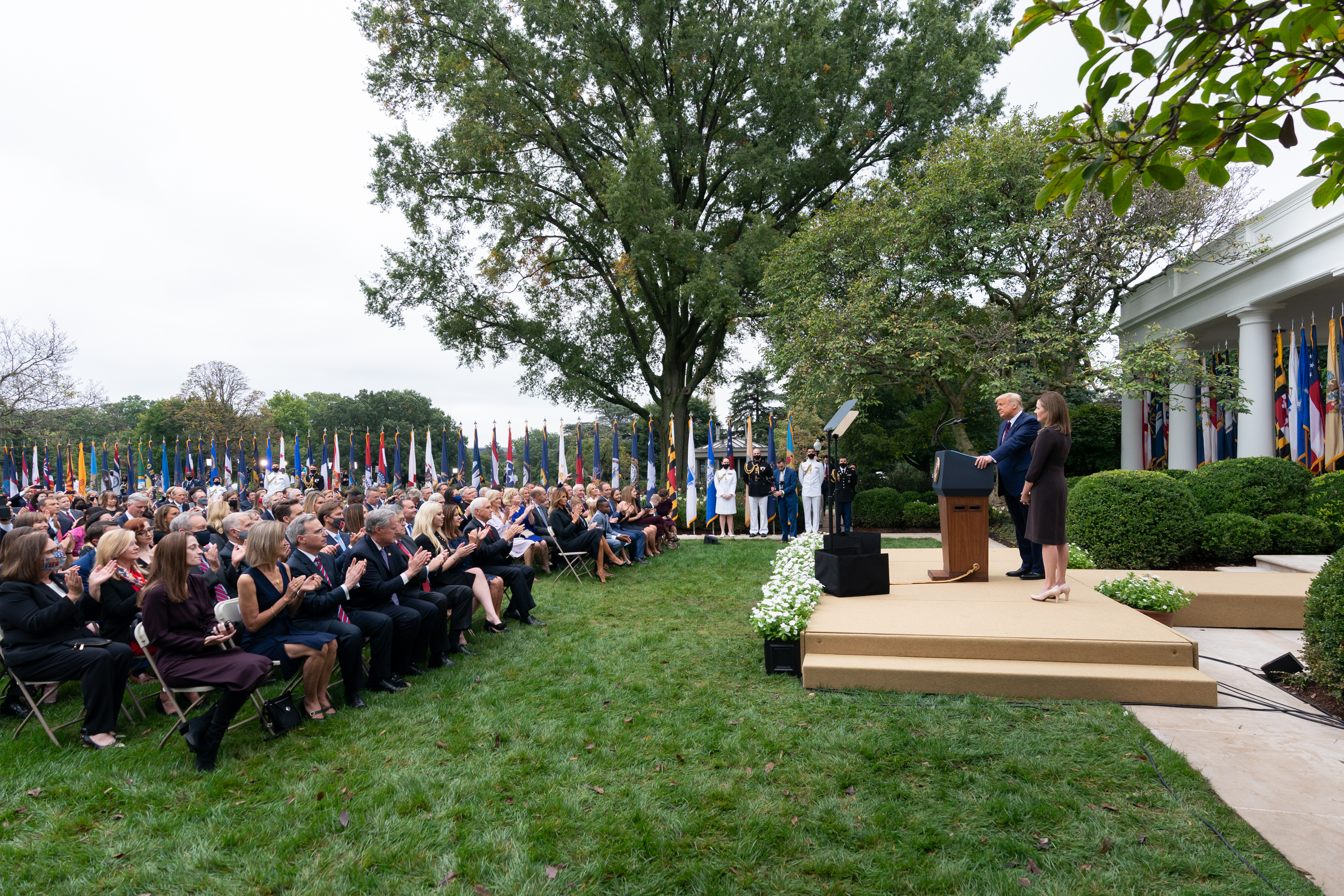
- President Donald Trump speaking during the event held to announce Amy Coney Barrett's nomination to the Supreme Court in the White House Rose Garden
- Disease: COVID-19
- Pathogen: SARS-CoV-2
- Location: White House, Washington, D.C., United States
- First reported: October 1, 2020
- Index case: September 30, 2020
- Arrival date: September 26, 2020; 6 years ago
- Confirmed cases: Total: At least 53, including President Trump; Pre-nomination: At least six as of October 14; Nomination: At least 25 as of October 14; Pence staff: At least 5 as of November 11; Election Day: At least 20 as of November 11
- Hospitalized cases: At least one, by October 15

The White House COVID-19 outbreak was a cluster of SARS-CoV-2 infections that began in September 2020 and ended in January 2021 that spread among people, including many U.S. government officials, who were in close contact during the COVID-19 pandemic in Washington, D.C. Numerous high-profile individuals were infected, including President Donald Trump, who was hospitalized for three days. At least 48 White House staff members or associates, closely working with White House personnel, tested positive for the virus. The White House resisted efforts to engage in contact tracing, leaving it unclear how many people were infected in total and what the origins of the spread were.

Many of the infections appeared to be related to a ceremony held on September 26 in the Rose Garden for the nomination of Amy Coney Barrett to the Supreme Court, where seating was not socially distanced and participants were mostly unmasked. His chief of staff recalled that Trump looked "a little tired" and was suspected of having a "slight cold".

Hours after the ceremony, Trump tested positive for COVID-19, although the public would not learn of this result until one year later, in October 2021. Trump himself may have been infectious at that point, but he and his entourage attended several subsequent events unmasked, including the first presidential debate against Joe Biden in Cleveland, Ohio on September 29. The next day, Presidential Counselor Hope Hicks was placed in quarantine aboard Air Force One while returning with Trump from a campaign event in Minnesota. Following that, the president proceeded on schedule to an October 1 New Jersey fundraiser where he mingled, unmasked, with donors. More infections were reported in late October among Vice President Mike Pence's staff, and a second large outbreak occurred after Election Day, after Trump held a watch party in the East Room.

Other infections included First Lady Melania Trump; Republican Senators Thom Tillis, Mike Lee, and Ron Johnson; Republican Representative Matt Gaetz; Trump campaign manager Bill Stepien; RNC Chair Ronna McDaniel; former White House counselor Kellyanne Conway; former New Jersey Governor Chris Christie; Notre Dame president John I. Jenkins; Press Secretary Kayleigh McEnany; presidential advisor Stephen Miller; Chief of Staff Mark Meadows; and Housing and Urban Development Secretary Ben Carson. As of November 11, at least 48 people had tested positive. At least one person, White House security office head Crede Bailey, was reported as "gravely ill," having fallen sick in September prior to the Rose Garden event.

The Rose Garden cluster emerged in the final weeks of Trump's campaign for the 2020 presidential election, a little more than a month before the last day of voting, November 3. Commentators were critical of the White House for providing conflicting information about Trump's condition and the timeline of his infection, as well as delaying the disclosure of the initial diagnoses of White House staffers. According to public health experts such as Anthony Fauci, the director of the National Institute of Allergy and Infectious Diseases and a member of the White House Coronavirus Task Force, the outbreak could have been prevented.

== Timeline of viral transmission ==
=== Background ===
Press Briefing by White House COVID-19 Response Team and Public Health Officials, 2021-05-18

Throughout the COVID-19 pandemic, Donald Trump and William Barr discouraged officials and staff from wearing masks. Those in the West Wing who did use them often faced ridicule from others. In April, the White House became one of the first locations to gain access to rapid-turnaround COVID-19 tests. The White House relied upon rapid-tests which lacked FDA-approval for use in asymptomatic individuals.

Throughout the spring, there had been sporadic cases of COVID-19 reported at the White House. On March 20, it was announced that a staffer for Vice President Mike Pence had tested positive and was experiencing very mild symptoms, though neither Trump nor Pence had been in close contact with the staffer. On May 7, an unnamed personal valet to the president tested positive, and the following day, Pence spokesperson Katie Miller tested positive for COVID-19. Miller's positive test result caused several other Pence staffers who were in close contact with her to be removed from Air Force Two before Pence's trip to Iowa, but neither Trump nor Pence had been in recent close contact with Miller.

In June, the White House scaled back the screening regime, but still required screening and testing for anyone coming into contact with the president or vice president.

=== Campaign events, Crede Bailey diagnosed ===
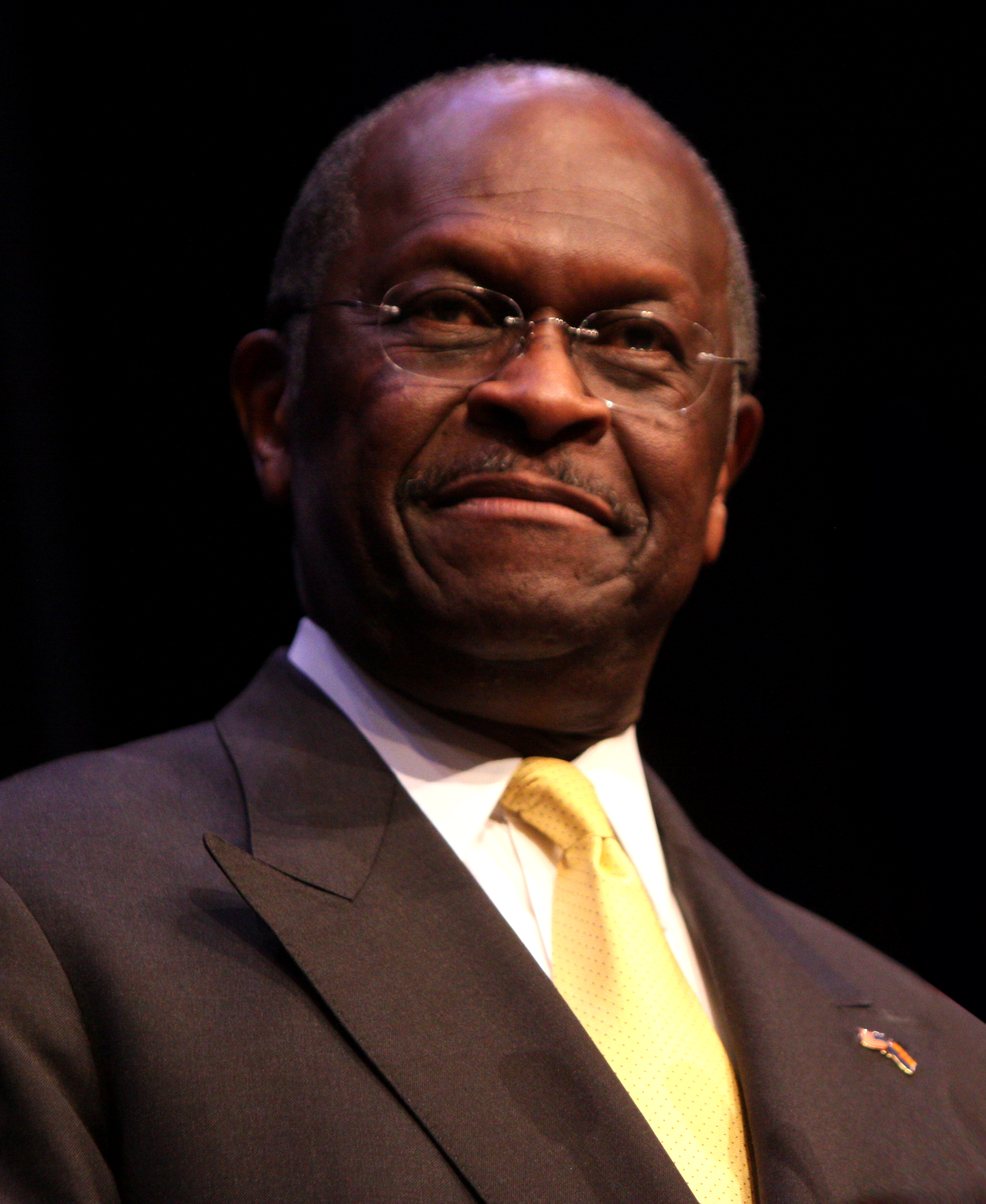
Herman Cain died from COVID-19 on July 30, 2020.

A Stanford preprint study concluded that likely over 30,000 cases and 700 deaths could be attributed to Trump rallies held between June 20 and September 22. On June 20, Trump held a campaign rally in Tulsa, the first since the start of the pandemic. Attendees who tested positive include two Secret Service agents, two staffers, the girlfriend of the President's eldest son, Kimberly Guilfoyle and politician Herman Cain. Cain died from the disease on July 30. Tulsa experienced a significant increase in cases after the rally.

From August 17–20, Trump held rallies at Mankato, Minnesota and Lackawanna County, Pennsylvania. About 500 attended Mankato, and masks and social distancing were not used. Several hundred attended the event in Lackawanna, masks were mostly used but social distancing was not. Both communities experienced surges of COVID-19 in the wake of the rallies.

Over Labor Day Weekend (Sept 5–7), Crede Bailey, the head of the White House security office, became sick with COVID-19. He was hospitalized sometime in September, becoming gravely ill. The White House kept his condition secret and declined to comment when his condition was reported in the news on October 7.

On September 13, Trump held a 5,000 person rally in Henderson, Nevada, violating of the state's ban on gatherings larger than 50 people and resulting in a fine. One case was later traced to "a political rally".

On September 16, it was reported that at least one unnamed staffer had tested positive. After Trump's hospitalization, it was revealed that two members of the residence staff had tested positive that week. On September 17, Trump held a rally at an airport in Mosinee, Wisconsin; Thousands attended, few masks were worn and social distancing was not observed. The county experienced a surge in COVID-19.

Trump held a rally in Bemidji, Minnesota on September 18. Thousands attended in violation of the Minnesota ban on gatherings of more than 250, few attendees wore face masks, and there was no social distancing. 16 cases were linked to the rally, including two who were hospitalized. The county saw a spike of COVID-19 after the rally. On September 24, Mike Pence and Ivanka Trump held an event at a Minneapolis hotel. Three attendees would later test positive.

=== Trump campaign fundraiser, September 25 ===
Trump met Republican National Committee chairwoman Ronna McDaniel, McEnany, and others at a September 25 fundraiser at the Trump International Hotel. On October 1, McDaniel appeared on Fox News and made no mention of her health, despite receiving confirmation of her positive test result on the afternoon of September 30. Two days later, an RNC spokesperson announced that McDaniel had tested positive.

=== Amy Coney Barrett nomination events, September 26 ===
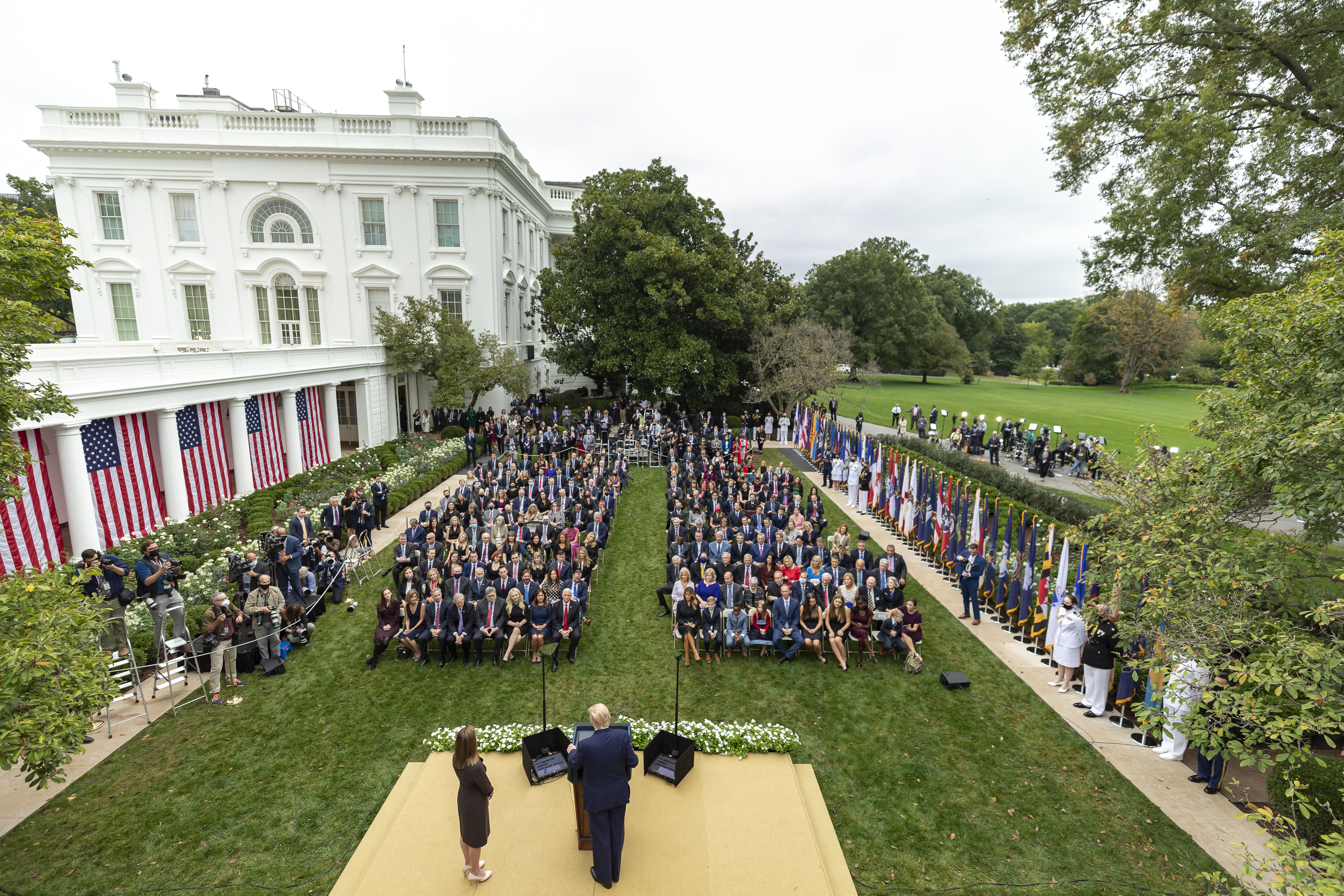
President Trump announcing his Supreme Court nomination in the Rose Garden

On September 26, 2020, an event was held in the White House Rose Garden announcing Amy Coney Barrett's nomination to the Supreme Court following the death of Ruth Bader Ginsburg. More than 150 people attended; they were told they did not need to wear masks if they had tested negative that day. Chairs for the outdoor ceremony were placed side by side, and there were two crowded indoor receptions. At least seven attendees tested positive for SARS-CoV-2 in the following week, including President Trump, First Lady Melania Trump, Senators Mike Lee and Thom Tillis, University of Notre Dame president John I. Jenkins, former Counselor to the President Kellyanne Conway, and former New Jersey Governor Chris Christie. Barrett had suffered infection in the summer before recovering and testing negative. Michael D. Shear, a White House correspondent for The New York Times, first tested positive for the virus October 2, as did many others. He was not present at the Rose Garden event, but had visited the White House on September 27 for a COVID-19 test, required before traveling with the President to a rally in Pennsylvania.

President Trump announces nominee for Associate Justice of the Supreme Court.

Kellyanne Conway's daughter Claudia revealed on social media on the evening of October 2 that her mother had tested positive for COVID-19. The same day, Senators Lee and Tillis were revealed to have tested positive. Christie confirmed on October 3 that he had tested positive for COVID-19. Christie had been present at debate preparation for Trump as well as the nomination ceremony for Barrett. Later that day, Christie announced he was hospitalized after his condition worsened; Christie received an experimental antibody cocktail from Eli Lilly as well as remdesivir. Lee was filmed hugging other attendees while not wearing a mask. Five of the infected were seated in the front three rows at the event, in close contact with Republican senior officials. Christie was released from the Morristown Medical Center in New Jersey on October 10. Jenkins later issued a statement saying: "I regret my error of judgment in not wearing a mask during the ceremony and by shaking hands with a number of people in the Rose Garden."

Infectious disease physician Robert L. Murphy said that if the infections are traced to the Rose Garden ceremony, they may have been started by a superspreader (a highly contagious person), and that they could have been avoided if face masks were worn and social distancing was practiced. He said, "Whoever got this thing going is a superspreader". The outdoor portion of the event was less likely to be a super-spreader event than the indoor portion. At least 10 members of the Notre Dame faculty besides Jenkins attended the event, but as of October 7, none had tested positive. On November 10, it was announced that one attendee, Harry R. Jackson Jr., had died; no cause of death was given.

The White House did not do contact tracing to minimize the spread of the outbreak, limiting any effort to notify those who have been exposed to Trump. The Centers for Disease Control made several offers to assist the White House with contact tracing, but they were repeatedly declined. On October 6, the White House announced that it had completed contact tracing, but several reporters who had tested positive for the virus said the White House had not reached out to them.

=== Trump tests positive, September 26 ===
Hours after the ceremony, Trump tested positive for COVID-19, although the public would not learn of this result until late 2021. His chief of staff recalled that Trump looked "a little tired" and was suspected of having a "slight cold".

Despite testing positive, Trump traveled in Air Force One to a rally at the Harrisburg International Airport in Pennsylvania, which was attended by thousands. The governor opposed the rally, arguing: "It is gravely concerning that the president would insist on holding this event with blatant disregard for social distancing and masking requirements. His decision to bring thousands of people together in a tight space in the midst of a global pandemic caused by an airborne virus is flat out wrong." After Trump's diagnosis was made public, Pennsylvania health officials advised attendees to participate in the state's contact tracing program. In the wake of the rally, the county saw a surge in COVID-19.

=== Gold Star families reception, September 27 ===
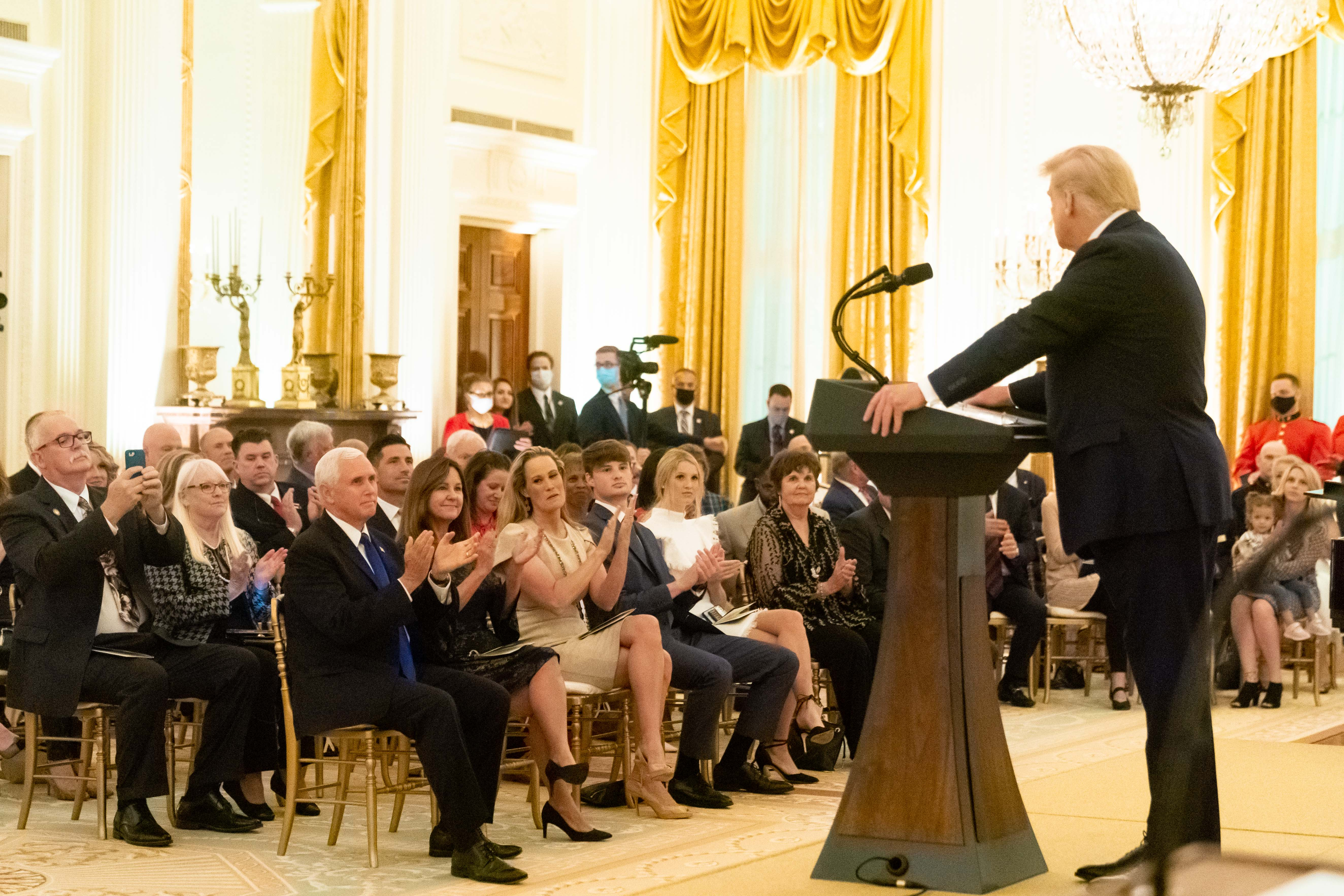
President Trump addresses an unmasked crowd at a White House reception for Gold Star families on Sept. 27.

Trump hosted Gold Star families and Pentagon leaders in the East Room of the White House. Attendees were photographed seated in close proximity and not wearing masks. Defense Secretary Mark Esper and General Mark Milley, Chairman of the Joint Chiefs of Staff, attended the event.

Admiral Charles Ray, vice commandant of the Coast Guard, attended the event, later tested positive and entered isolation on Oct 6. On October 2, Ray attended meetings at the Pentagon with members of the Joint Chiefs of Staff. On Oct 6 all but one of the Joint Chiefs of Staff – Gen. David H. Berger, Commandant of the Marine Corps – went into isolation, including Milley, Vice chairman John E. Hyten, Chief of Naval Operations Michael M. Gilday, Chief of Staff of the Army James C. McConville, Air Force Chief of Staff Charles Q. Brown Jr., Chief of Space Operations John W. Raymond, Chief the National Guard Bureau Daniel Hokanson, and Commander of U.S. Cyber Command Paul Nakasone. Of those quarantined, General Nakasone is a combatant commander, part of the direct chain of command from the president to the military, and also the Director of the National Security Agency. General Gary L. Thomas, assistant commandant of the Marine Corps, stood in for Gen. Berger at the meeting and later tested positive with symptoms.

=== First presidential debate, September 26–29 ===
Multiple White House personnel attended the September 29 debate at the Cleveland Clinic. Trump, Melania, and senior advisor Hope Hicks attended the debate and later tested positive. Senior advisor Stephen Miller was also on Air Force One for the trip and later tested positive. Also in attendance were Ivanka Trump and her siblings, Donald Jr., Eric, Lara and Tiffany Trump.

Trump prepared for the debate between September 26 and September 29 in the Map Room of the White House. His debate preparation team included Chris Christie, Hope Hicks, Kellyanne Conway, Rudy Giuliani, Jason Miller, Mark Meadows, Jared Kushner, Kayleigh McEnany, Alyssa Farah, and Stephen Miller. Christie stated that no masks were worn. Five of the 10 debate prep team members tested positive for SARS-CoV-2 within a week after the debate. The City of Cleveland said that at least 11 people who "were either members of the media or were scheduled to work logistics/set-up the days prior to the event" later tested positive. A year later, Christie—who had spent four days in the room with Trump, roleplaying Joe Biden—recalled that there had been seven people in the debate preparation room, and "six of the seven of us in that room got [COVID-19]." Those six included Trump, Christie, Hicks, Stepien, Conway, and Miller. Christie, who eventually required intensive care for his COVID-19, said "I think it's undeniable" that Trump was the source of the infection, given that Trump was "the only person [about whom] I didn't know his testing regimen." Christie complained that neither Trump nor White House chief of staff Mark Meadows had revealed the president's positive test result before or during the debate preparations.

Prior to the debate, both the Biden and Trump campaigns agreed with the Commission on Presidential Debates that all attendees would be masked, with the exception of the two presidential candidates and debate moderator Chris Wallace. Masking was enforced at the door, but several of Trump's guests in the audience, including his wife Melania, his family members, and senior staff, removed their masks after entering the hall. When Trump's guests were personally offered masks by Cleveland Clinic staff, they declined.

All attendees were supposed to be tested for coronavirus before admission. After the outbreak was public, Wallace revealed that Trump and his personnel arrived too late to be tested, and were instead admitted to the debate hall under "an honor system". In the coming days, the White House repeatedly declined to say when Trump last tested negative, raising speculation that he may have gone untested or even tested positive prior to the debate. On October 6, the New York Times broke news that, despite public impressions to the contrary, Donald Trump was not actually being tested daily. The timeline raised the possibility that Trump "might have tested positive before the Sept. 29 debate, failed to disclose it and showed up at the debate anyway."

=== Hope Hicks diagnosed ===
On Wednesday, Trump went to suburban Minneapolis for a private fundraiser at the home of Marty Davis, CEO of kitchen counter-top manufacturer Cambria. Thirteen members of the catering staff were quarantined after their exposure. That fundraiser was followed by a rally in Duluth. Hope Hicks, one of his closest advisors, accompanied Trump aboard Air Force One. The rally ended around 10 p.m. EDT. The Minnesota Department of Health later traced four cases to the Duluth rally.

During the Minnesota rally, Hicks stayed aboard the plane because she was not feeling well, and she quarantined herself at the back of the plane for the flight home. A test confirmed her diagnosis as COVID-positive. Aides sensed that Trump was not feeling well during the Wednesday trip.

The White House initially sought to keep Hicks' diagnosis secret, and as of the morning of Thursday, October 1, only a very small group of senior White House officials knew of Hicks' diagnosis. No mention of her diagnosis was made in press secretary Kayleigh McEnany's news briefing that day. McEnany later tested positive. After learning of Hicks's positive test, CNN reporter Kaitlan Collins said, "Why did the press secretary still hold a briefing despite knowing she had come into contact with somebody who had just tested positive for coronavirus? She didn't even tell us. Didn't even tell reporters who were on the plane. Didn't disclose any of that." McEnany later said she did not learn about Hicks until later that day.

Hicks' diagnosis was first reported by Jennifer Jacobs and Jordan Fabian of Bloomberg at 8:07 p.m. on October 1.

=== Bedminster fundraiser, October 1 ===
At least five of Trump's closest associates cancelled their scheduled travel to a fundraiser at Bedminster: daughter Ivanka Trump, son-in-law Jared Kushner, body man Nick Luna, Trump's deputy chief of staff for communications Dan Scavino, and press secretary Kayleigh McEnany. Despite his exposure, Trump proceeded with the event, flying aboard Air Force One. The event had an indoor roundtable, an indoor VIP reception, and an outdoor reception. Trump spoke without a mask to over 200 supporters, most of whom also did not wear a mask. Attendees noted that Trump seemed "lethargic" and "not himself". He showed symptoms of a mild cough, some nasal congestion, and fatigue. Jayna McCarron, Coast Guard aide to President Trump, was assigned to accompany Trump to the Bedminster fundraiser. She later tested positive for SARS-CoV-2.

=== Trump announces positive test result ===
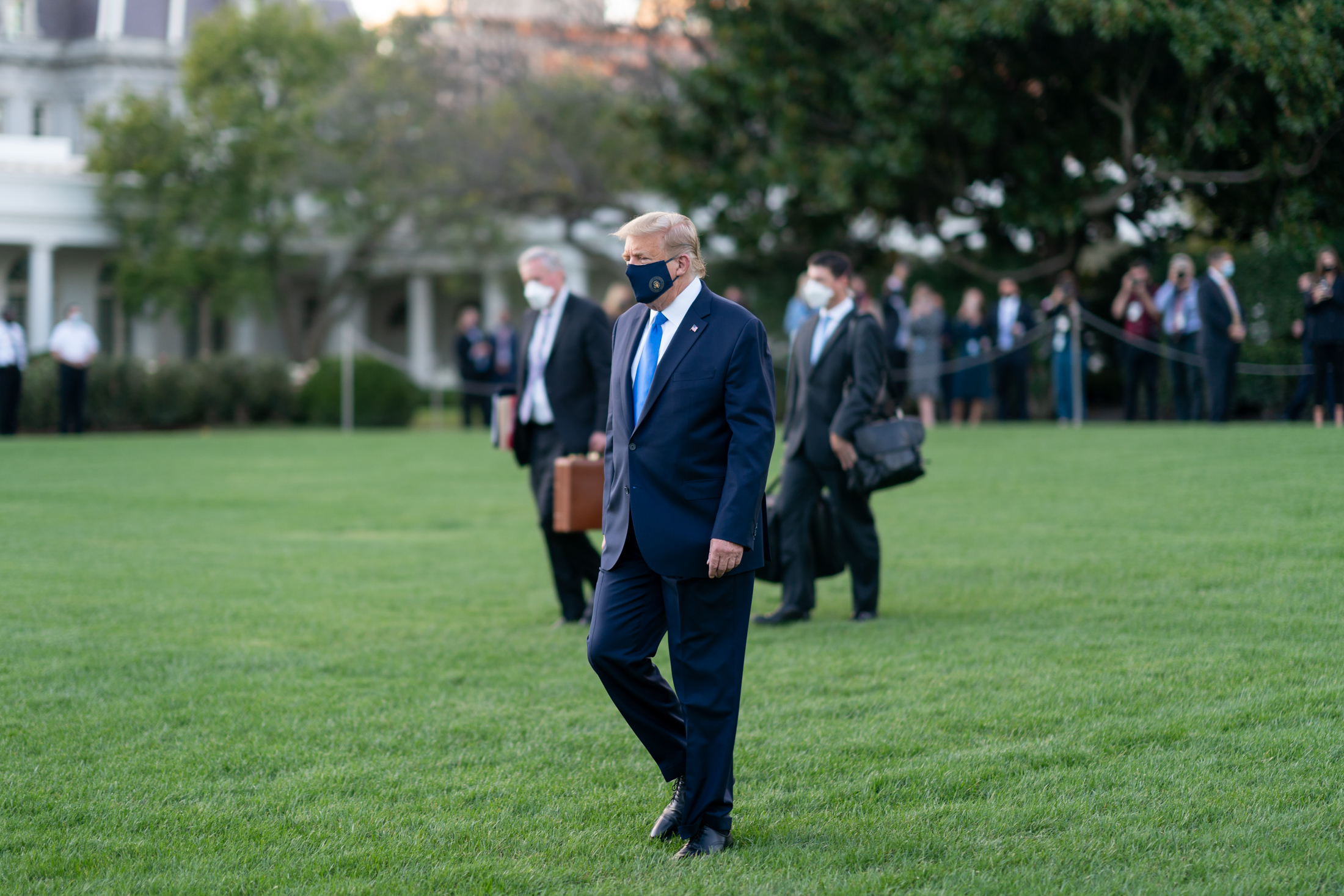
President Trump departs the White House for COVID-19 treatment on October 2, 2020.

After returning from Bedminster, Trump received a positive test result on a rapid test and was waiting to get results of a PCR test when he did a live phone interview on Hannity. Sean Hannity of Fox News brought up Bloomberg's report about Hicks and asked for an update, whereupon Trump publicly mentioned Hicks' diagnosis for the first time, saying, "I just heard about this. She tested positive." Trump stated, "It is very, very hard when you are with people from the military, or from law enforcement, and they come over to you, and they want to hug you, and they want to kiss you because we really have done a good job for them." Without disclosing that he had already tested positive, he announced that he and the first lady were being tested for SARS-CoV-2. He repeated this via Twitter after the interview. Later that night, the result of the PCR test also came in positive. Trump was hospitalized the next day, October 2.

=== Further outbreak ===
On October 2, it was announced that Trump 2020 campaign manager Bill Stepien tested positive, as did Wisconsin U.S. Senator Ron Johnson, who had been exposed to someone who tested positive when he returned to Washington D.C. on September 29. When he announced his test on October 3, Johnson said he had been with Trump over the last several weeks. Three White House press room journalists, including Michael D. Shear, also tested positive on October 2, as did a White House staffer who works with the press. On October 9, Representative Mike Bost was announced to have tested positive and developed symptoms after interacting with Sen. Mike Lee.

Trump's personal attendant Nick Luna's positive test results were announced on October 3. Luna had been at the debate and on the flight to Minnesota. Claudia Conway, the daughter of Kellyanne Conway, announced on October 4 that she had tested positive as well. Also on October 4, Attorney General Barr reversed his previous stance and announced he would be entering quarantine. On October 5, White House Press Secretary Kayleigh McEnany announced she had also tested positive. Two other White House press room staffers, Chad Gilmartin and Karoline Leavitt, were also reported to have tested positive on October 5. On October 6, new announced infections included: assistant press secretary Jalen Drummond, presidential military aide Jayna McCarron, and an unidentified military aide.

On October 7, 2020, Bloomberg News cited four people who reported that head of the White House Security Officer Crede Bailey was "gravely ill" with COVID-19 and had been in hospital since September. Bailey had been ill even before the September 26 Rose Garden event.

== Presidential hospitalization and early release ==
=== Airlift to Walter Reed and experimental treatments, October 2 ===
Avatar of Donald Trump

Donald Trump
(@realDonaldTrump)
tweeted:

Tonight, @FLOTUS and I tested positive for COVID-19. We will begin our quarantine and recovery process immediately. We will get through this TOGETHER!

October 2, 2020

At 12:54 a.m. EDT on October 2, Trump announced via Twitter that both he and the first lady had tested positive for the SARS-CoV-2 virus that night. The afternoon of the same day, the White House announced that Trump would be hospitalized at Walter Reed National Military Medical Center in Bethesda, Maryland "for the next few days" "out of an abundance of caution", on the recommendation of the medical team headed by Sean Conley, a Doctor of Osteopathic Medicine who had been the Physician to the President since 2018. Because he was a Navy commander, Conley was obliged to follow the orders of his commander-in-chief. Trump, who was wearing a mask, was briefly filmed walking unassisted from the White House to the Marine One helicopter outside to transport him to Walter Reed. According to White House Chief of Staff Mark Meadows, Trump was hospitalized because he "had a fever and his blood oxygen level had dropped rapidly". The Associated Press reported that "a person familiar with Trump's condition confirmed that Trump was given oxygen at the White House" in the morning before arriving at Walter Reed, although Trump's doctors refused to say whether he had ever been given supplemental oxygen.

Trump had Walter Reed personnel sign non-disclosure agreements in 2019 before they could be involved in treating him. Two doctors refused to sign the NDAs and were not allowed to have any involvement in his care. Medical personnel are already prohibited by the Health Insurance Portability and Accountability Act (HIPAA) from releasing personal health information without consent. Medical ethics professor Arthur Caplan called the NDAs redundant.

On Friday afternoon, physicians revealed Trump had been given an experimental course of monoclonal antibodies from drug maker Regeneron Pharmaceuticals, which further confirmed that Trump had received an "8 gram dose of REGN-COV2". The drug was immediately provided in response to a "compassionate use" request from the medical team. That night, Trump received his first infusion of remdesivir, an antiviral drug that disrupts virus replication. Remdesivir has not been approved by the Food and Drug Administration, but has been used as an emergency treatment for hospitalized COVID-19 patients. The extremely aggressive combination was described as "uncharted territory"; Trump is believed to be the first individual to ever undergo both treatments simultaneously.

=== Steroid treatment, October 3 ===
Dr. Sean Conley, Physician to the President, provides an update.

At an 11 a.m. press conference on October 3, Conley stated that Trump was not currently on oxygen, that he had not had a fever for the past 24 hours, and that he was "doing very well". Conley described Trump as being "just 72 hours into the diagnosis now", raising questions among journalists about when the diagnosis had actually been made, since it had been publicly announced only 36 hours previously. A 72-hour timeline would suggest that Trump actually knew he had the infection on September 30, but proceeded with his plans for a public rally that evening and a fundraiser on October 1. Conley later clarified that he had meant "day three" instead of "72 hours", referring to the then-current time of Saturday morning compared to the diagnosis time of Thursday night (about 36 hours). Doctors also revealed that he had exhibited symptoms on October 1, including a "mild cough, and some nasal congestion and fatigue". When Conley was asked if Trump was on steroids, Conley ended the briefing.

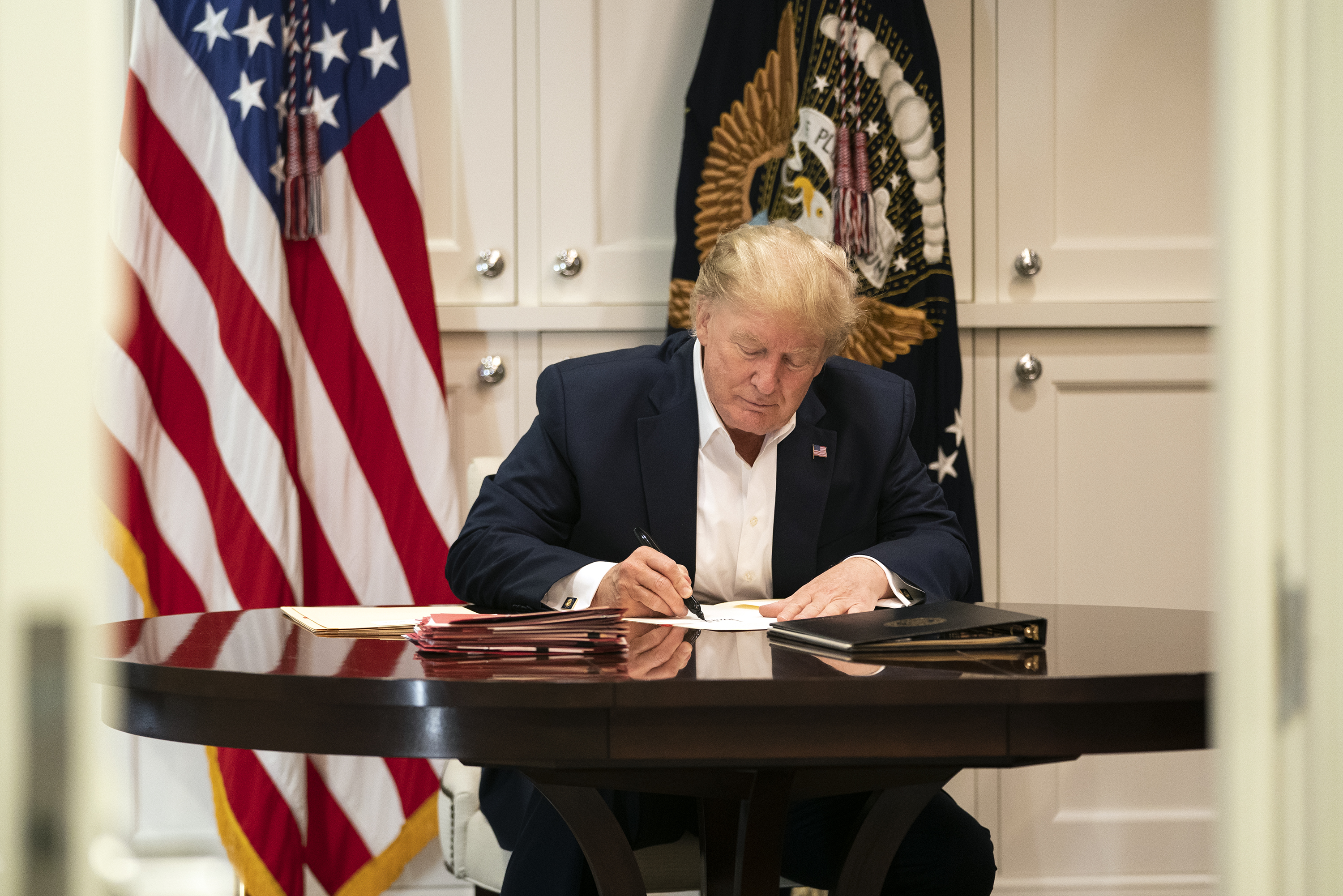
Trump in the Walter Reed conference room, October 3

Minutes after the press conference, an anonymous source – later identified as Meadows – contradicted the assessment from the doctors, saying "The president's vitals over the last 24 hours were very concerning and the next 48 hours will be critical in terms of his care", adding "We're still not on a clear path yet to a full recovery." Shortly thereafter, Meadows stated on the record the president was "doing very well". That night, Conley warned that Trump was "not yet out of the woods" with regard to his condition. The White House released two photos which showed Trump working at the hospital, according to their captions. White House reporter Andrew Feinberg noted that in one of the photos the president was signing documents that appeared to be blank.

=== Motorcade excursion, October 4 ===
Press update on President Trump, October 4

In an October 4 press conference, Trump's medical team said that he was "doing really well" after his oxygen level dipped the day before and after he was given the steroid dexamethasone, which works by reducing inflammation in the lungs. Asked if CT scans showed pneumonia or lung damage, Conley said, "There's some expected findings, but nothing of any major clinical concern." He declined to say what was found. When asked why he was reluctant to disclose that Trump had been given oxygen during the October 3 briefing, Conley stated that he did not want to "give any information that might steer the course of illness in another direction" and "it came off that we're trying to hide something, which wasn't necessarily true." White House Director of Strategic Communications Alyssa Farah later stated that it was "a common medical practice that you want to convey confidence, and you want to raise the spirits of the person you're treating," while also asserting that Meadows' anonymous statement to reporters was intended to "give you guys more information just to try to be as transparent as we can," effectively conceding Conley was addressing the president on television, rather than the public. The president was reported to be angry about Meadows' off-the-record assessment.

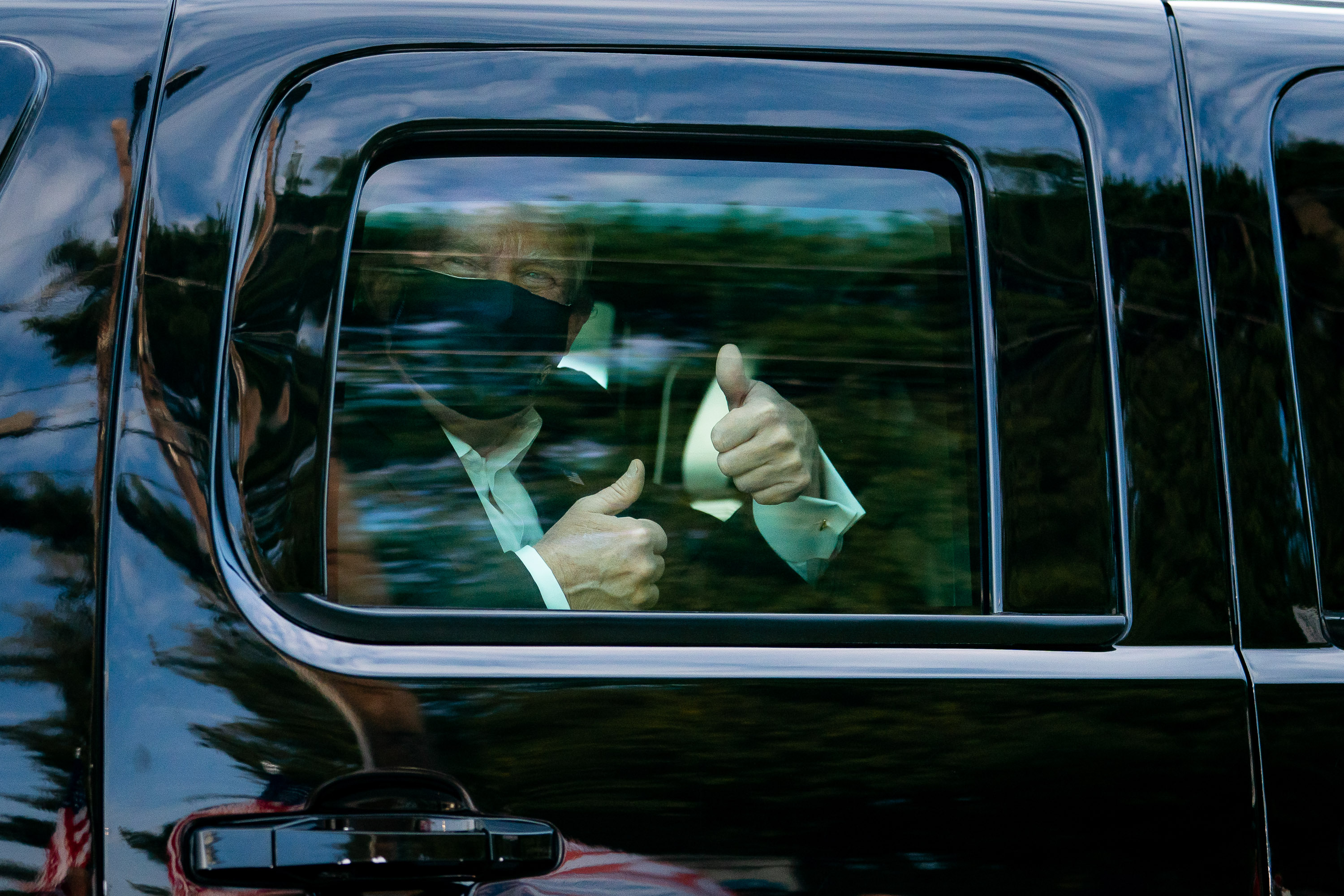
Trump greets supporters from inside an SUV on October 4.

Later in the day, Trump briefly departed the hospital to ride past a gathering of supporters at the medical center, waving from the back seat of an SUV, before returning. Medical experts stated that the short outing endangered the Secret Service agents accompanying Trump inside the vehicle due to his infection. James Phillips, doctor of emergency medicine at George Washington University and an attending physician at Walter Reed, sharply criticized the drive-by as "insanity" for "political theater" and wrote that Trump had endangered the Secret Service agents in the presidential SUV by potentially exposing them to COVID-19.

Within the Secret Service, some agents expressed outrage or frustration with Trump's behavior. One anonymous agent told journalists, "He's not even pretending to care now." Joseph Petro, a former veteran Secret Service agent and senior official, wrote in a Washington Post op-ed that Trump's behavior was part of a longstanding pattern of endangering others; he also criticized Secret Service management for an "inexcusable lack of concern" for the health of agents and their families.

=== Return to White House, October 5 ===
Press update on President Trump, October 5

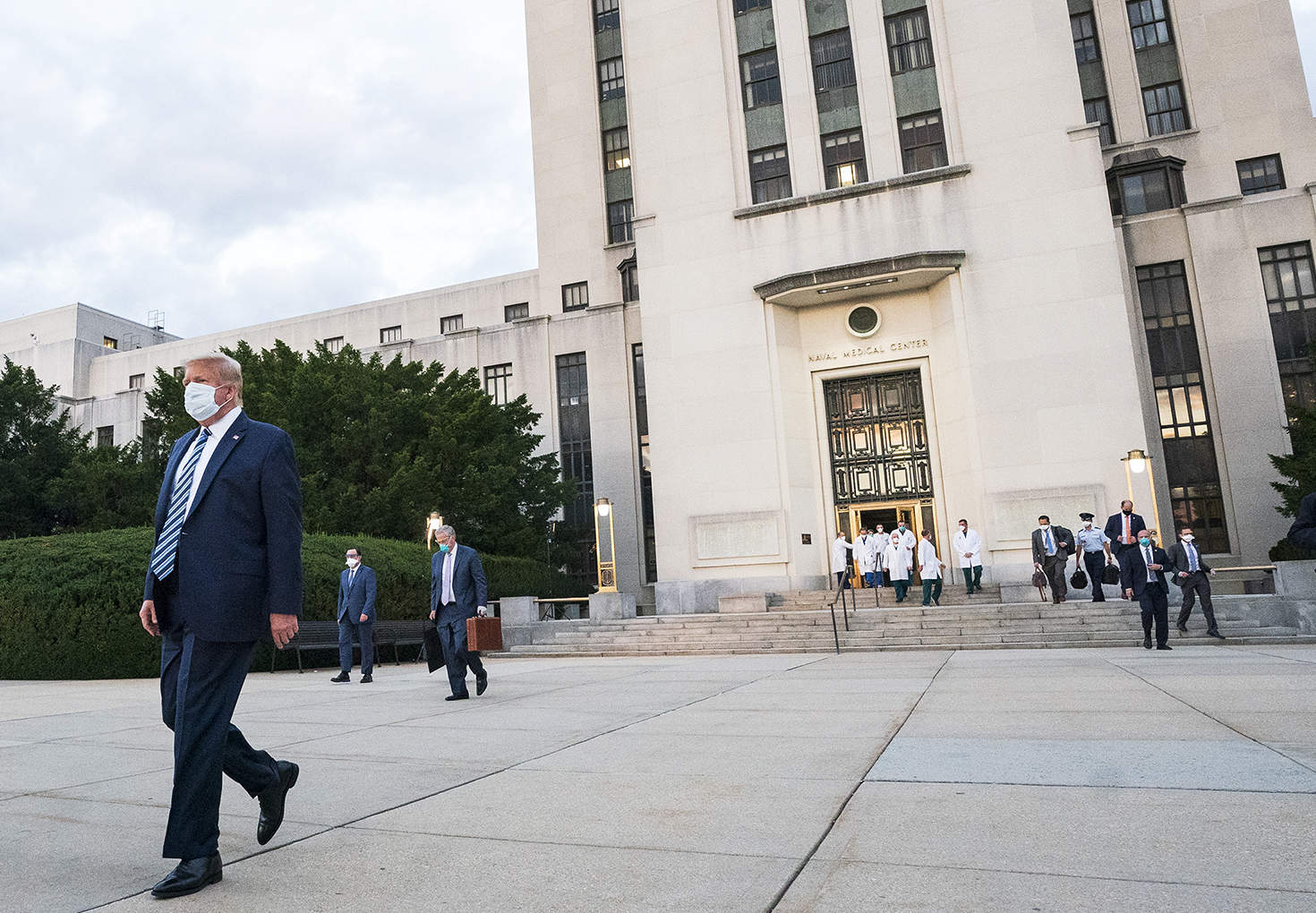
Trump discharged on October 5, 2020, from Walter Reed National Military Medical Center.

At 2:37 p.m. EDT on October 5, Trump tweeted that he would be discharged from the hospital at 6:30 p.m. that day. However, doctors said in an afternoon news briefing that Trump continued to be treated with dexamethasone and remdesivir. The prospect of Trump's early release astonished infectious disease experts, who noted that Trump planned to be discharged in a period when COVID-19 patients are particularly vulnerable (7–10 days after symptoms first appear) to unpredictable and rapid declines in condition. Outside physicians stated that the depiction of Trump's illness as relatively mild was inconsistent with the aggressive treatment he was receiving. Trump's medical team made cryptic remarks about his status and declined to say whether Trump's CT scans contained indications of pneumonia or lung damage. Trump made phone calls in which he shared the idea of him leaving the hospital feigning frailty, but would then rip open his dress shirt to reveal a Superman T-shirt underneath, as reported by The New York Times.

After reportedly pressuring his doctors to release him, he was discharged and arrived at the White House shortly before 7:00 p.m. He stood for a photo op at the South Portico balcony, where he removed his mask despite being potentially contagious. Having climbed two flights of stairs to the balcony, Trump appeared to breathe heavily as he steadied himself. He then gave a salute before walking inside. He later went back outside with a camera crew to reshoot his entrance.

Within an hour of his arrival Trump released a video message and a promotional video, set to dramatic orchestral music, showing Marine One's flight and landing and his saluting pose from the balcony. In the video message he said, "We're going back to work. We're going to be out front. As your leader, I had to do that. I knew there's danger to it, but I had to do it. I stood out front. I led. Nobody that's a leader would not do what I did. And I know there's a risk, there's a danger, but that's OK. And now I'm better and maybe I'm immune, I don't know. But don't let it dominate your lives." The message was widely criticized. The New York Times commented, "Trump's statement was meant to cast his illness as an act of courage rather than the predictable outcome of recklessness." He also echoed a message he had earlier tweeted: "Don't be afraid of Covid. Don't let it dominate your life" – a message which reportedly angered many survivors of the virus or people who had lost loved ones to the disease. The New York Times tabulated that Trump's tests, treatments, airlifts, and hospital stay, if given to an average American, would have cost more than $100,000. The helicopter rides alone would have cost $40,000 after insurance.

=== Return to the West Wing, October 6–7 ===
On October 6 and 7, Trump made no public appearances and had an empty public schedule, although he made more than 50 Twitter posts. In the tweets, Trump compared SARS-CoV-2 to the flu and falsely claimed that the flu had higher death rates: "Are we going to close down our Country (because of the flu)? No, we have learned to live with it, just like we are learning to live with Covid, in most populations far less lethal!!!" Many doctors expressed alarm at the notion that the public should "learn to live with" the pandemic. Twitter tagged the post with a "misleading and potentially harmful information" flag, and Facebook removed a similar post by Trump. Four hours after the tweet, and after it was flagged by Twitter's staff, Trump tweeted "REPEAL SECTION 230", an attack against Section 230 of the Communications Decency Act, which protects online platforms from litigation surrounding the content their users post.

Trump's behavior on October 6 caused some White House staffers to wonder if he was being influenced by the cocktail of drugs he had been taking. Aides said that Trump still sometimes sounded as if he was trying to catch his breath; Trump continued to receive remdesivir treatment inside the White House and conducted business without wearing a mask. Dr. Conley said in a memo that Trump has "no symptoms" and is doing "extremely well."

On October 7, Trump insisted on conducting business in the Oval Office, although he was supposed to be quarantined in the residential portion of the White House and rooms had been set up there where he could work. He reportedly entered the Oval Office through an outdoor entrance so as not to encounter staff. Only two aides – Mark Meadows and Dan Scavino – spent time with him there, fully dressed in personal protective equipment.

=== Return to public events, October 8–12 ===
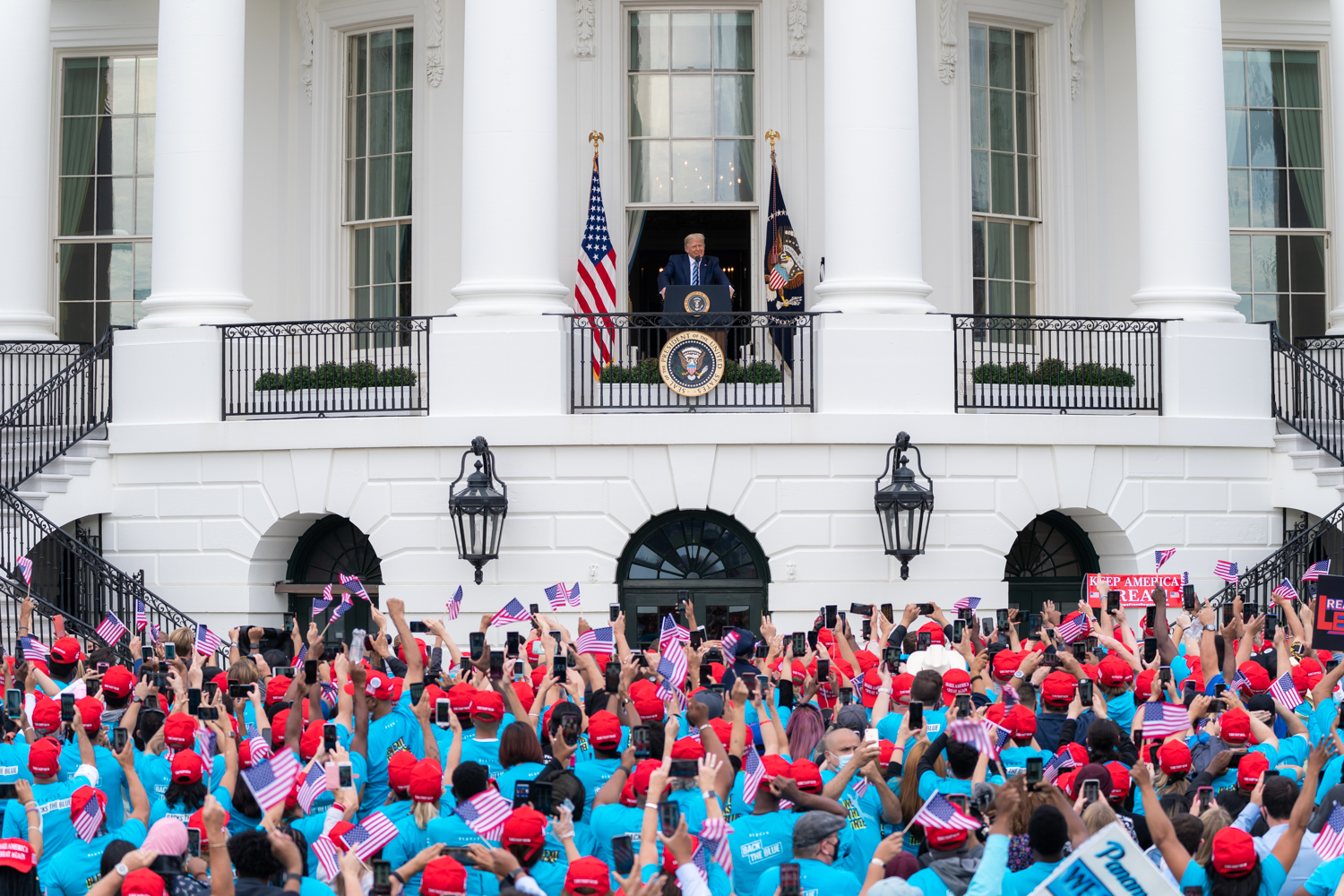
Trump speaking to a crowd in the White House grounds on October 10, 2020

Trump suggested that he could have contracted COVID-19 from family members of fallen soldiers who were at the September 27 reception for Gold Star Families. He said on a Fox Business interview on October 8 that the family members "come within an inch of my face" and that "They want to hug me, and they want to kiss me." Trump did not wear a mask during the event. The White House later clarified that "based on contact tracing, the data we have, we don't think it arose from that event" while defending holding such events indoors with few or no masks. Trump also said in the interview that he remains on dexamethasone.

Dr. Conley issued a memo that day saying that Trump's condition was stable and he was "devoid of symptoms". He added that "Saturday (October 10) will be day 10 since Thursday's diagnosis, and based on the trajectory of advanced diagnostics the team has been conducting, I fully anticipate the president's safe return to public engagements at that time." Ten to 20 days is the CDC's recommendation for how long people should isolate themselves after having COVID-19. In an interview that night, Trump said he would like to hold a rally in Florida on October 10 and one in Pennsylvania on the 11th.

On October 10, Trump held his first public event since being diagnosed with the virus, speaking briefly from the South Lawn portico to hundreds of guests. Conley said on October 12 that Trump tested negative on "consecutive days" using rapid antigen tests and that the results of a PCR test, along with CDC guidelines for mild to moderate cases, indicate that he is not infectious. The CDC says it "does not recommend using antigen tests to make decisions about discontinuing isolation" and that negative tests should be confirmed with a PCR test. Later that day, Trump held his first rally since being diagnosed, in Sanford, Florida. The Wall Street Journal, The Washington Post, and other news outlets did not send reporters to travel with Trump, citing concerns over basic precautions.

== Subsequent outbreaks ==
=== Pence staff ===
In late October, ABC News learned an unidentified staffer in the vice president's office had tested positive. Days later, it was announced that five close advisers to Pence had tested positive: Marc Short, Chief of Staff to the Vice President; Marty Obst, one of the Vice President's closest advisors; Zach Bauer, the Vice President's "body man;" as well as two unnamed members of Pence's staff.

After initially trying to keep the outbreak quiet, the White House announced that Pence would continue with his schedule, including political rallies, despite having been in "close contact with Mr. Short".

=== Election Night party ===
On November 3, 2020, Election Day, Donald Trump held a party for staffers and campaign officials in the East Room of the White House. The party was unprecedented in its size and scope. Similarly to the Barrett nomination, few people wore masks or practiced social distancing. On November 6, White House Chief of Staff Mark Meadows' positive COVID-19 test was made public. Meadows had been diagnosed on the 4th, but tried to keep his results secret, a move that concerned officials. Diagnoses for Cassidy Hutchinson, an aide to Meadows, Nick Trainor, a director for the Trump campaign, and five White House staffers were also made public on the 6th. The following day, Jared Kushner aide Charlton Boyd was reported to be infected, and Florida Representative Matt Gaetz announced he had developed antibodies for the virus.

On November 9, Secretary of Housing and Urban Development Ben Carson and Citizens United head David Bossie tested positive for COVID-19. According to his brother, Carson was "in good spirits". Two days later, Brian Jack, White House political director, and 2016 campaign spokesperson Healy Baumgardner were diagnosed. On November 12, it was revealed that party attendees Corey Lewandowski, a Trump campaign advisor, and Republican strategist and lobbyist Jeff Miller tested positive for coronavirus.

On November 13, media outlets reported that over 130 Secret Service officers had been forced to self-isolate because they tested positive for the coronavirus or had been in close contact with infected individuals.

== Effects on election and congressional activities ==
=== Vice presidential debate ===
Two days before the debate between Pence and Sen. Kamala Harris, the Commission on Presidential Debates announced that the stage at the University of Utah would feature plexiglass barriers separating Pence, Harris, and the moderator Susan Page of USA Today.

At the Rose Garden ceremony on September 26, Pence had sat one row away from Mike Lee, five seats away from Thom Tillis, and three rows away from Kayleigh McEnany. Pence was also with Trump and Melania at the reception for Gold Star Families and was with Trump in the Oval Office the day of the first presidential debate. Pence's physician said that Pence, who tested negative, was not a close contact with anyone who had tested positive and did not need to quarantine. The night before the debate, the Trump White House released a letter from Robert Redfield, the director of the CDC, to Pence's chief of staff Marc Short, in which Redfield declared that, based on his negative test results and discussions with Pence's physician, "the CDC concludes from a public health standpoint" that it was safe for Pence to debate. Redfield's letter, which was possibly unprecedented in CDC's history, sparked an outcry from public health experts inside and outside the CDC (such as Angela Rasmussen) because the agency had not conducted an investigation into Pence's contacts; some within the CDC also objected to the letter on the grounds that it constituted a use of Pence's "special privileged access to the nation's top public health official" for a political purpose. Some outside observers also raised continuity-of-government concerns with Pence declining to quarantine.

Despite his known exposure, Pence initially asked to not have a plexiglass barrier on his side of the stage. His spokesperson, Katie Miller, argued that the twelve feet of distance between the participants made the precaution unnecessary, and mocked Harris for using the barrier. The day before the debate, Pence dropped his objections and agreed to the barrier. A number of experts noted that a plexiglass barrier would not prevent airborne transmission, which given the stage setup was the biggest hazard. Though the Biden-Harris campaign sought to have the candidates stand, the Commission opted for the debate participants to be seated, which was the preference of the Trump-Pence.

Despite her known exposure, Karen Pence appeared unmasked, violating prior agreements that all attendees would be masked except for the moderator and candidates.

=== Second presidential debate ===
On October 8, the Commission on Presidential Debates made plans to have the second debate on October 15 be held in a virtual format due to Trump's COVID diagnosis. Trump declined to take part in a virtual debate, while Biden was willing to participate. Following Trump's refusal to participate, the Biden campaign announced that he would instead take questions from voters directly on October 15 via a town hall event hosted by ABC News in Philadelphia. The commission then canceled the debate altogether.

=== Supreme Court nomination hearings ===
The outbreak among senators caused the Senate to delay its session by two weeks to October 19, but the Judiciary Committee began Judge Amy Coney Barrett's nomination hearings on October 12. Democrats tried unsuccessfully to delay the fast-track proceedings by raising safety concerns in light of infections among members. Committee members Mike Lee and Thom Tillis, had already tested positive, both having attended the Rose Garden event in September; member Ted Cruz had been quarantining after coming into contact with the former. While the Capitol's mask requirements were generally enforced, Mike Lee, who had been cleared by the attending physician, gave his opening statement without a mask, though he wore a mask at other times. Sens. Cruz and Tillis appeared remotely on the first day of hearings, and participated in person the other days. Committee chairman Sen. Lindsey Graham, who was at the Rose Garden event and had brief contact with Sen. Lee, said he tested negative on October 2. He did not wear a mask at his seat, but put it on when Lee approached. Congressional safety officials said that the hearing met CDC guidelines, and the chamber was set up with air ventilation systems and distancing between senators.

== Concerns ==
=== Risk to the public ===
Epidemiologists and public health experts said that the outbreak had put many people at risk in many places. Those infected carried the virus across the country and attended events in places such as Atlanta, Pennsylvania, and Minnesota. At least 6,000 people attended gatherings where they mingled closely with those infected within a week of the Supreme Court nomination ceremony on September 26.

In the Washington, D.C. metropolitan area, the outbreaks at the White House and Capitol Hill (where masks are required on the House floor, but not the Senate floor) also presented a risk. The city had made substantial progress in reducing virus transmission through stringent public health laws and a population that largely followed these laws, but the clusters began a reversal and raised concerns that the city's overall infection rate would be affected. As a federal property, the White House is exempt from the District of Columbia's public health rules, and has disregarded local mandates. The Trump White House also did not share positive test results with state or local health agencies.

=== Date of Trump's last negative test ===
After President Trump was hospitalized, it was revealed that he was not being tested daily, and the White House was unwilling to reveal the date of his last negative test. In previous months, Trump had twice claimed to test negative: in March, Trump physician Sean Conley had announced that the president had tested negative after he was exposed to COVID-positive individuals at his Mar-a-Lago resort. After one of Trump's personal valets tested positive in May, Trump told reporters "I tested very positively in another sense so – this morning. Yeah. I tested positively toward negative, right. So. I tested perfectly this morning. Meaning I tested negative." At an October 16 event, Trump reported being unable to remember whether he had taken a test in the hours prior to the presidential debate.

=== Continuity of government implications ===
As of October 3, 2020, a White House spokesperson confirmed that Trump remained active as president and that there had been no transfer of presidential power to Vice President Pence. On October 2, House Speaker Nancy Pelosi, next in line for the presidency after Pence, said that the White House had not contacted her about continuity of government.

==== Military ====
Some national security analysts said the president's diagnosis put the United States into "uncharted territory" and "deep into the danger zone". Former Defense Secretary Leon Panetta said that Trump's hospitalization raises serious national security concerns and that adversaries should be expected to exploit any vulnerabilities of the United States. However, several former defense officials downplayed concerns of foreign opportunism and argued that the U.S. national security apparatus including the nuclear command-and-control elements of that system is resilient enough to withstand the impact of an ill or incapacitated president. Former Deputy Assistant Secretary of Defense for the Middle East Mick Mulroy said, "Unless symptoms are severe enough for the commander-in-chief to be incapacitated, it would not require a change of the chain of command," and that it was unlikely an adversary would use the situation to "test" the U.S.

On October 2, the Pentagon issued a statement saying, "There's no change to the readiness or capability of our armed forces. Our national command and control structure is in no way affected" by Trump's diagnosis.

=== Mental fitness concerns ===
According to a large study of COVID-19 survivors, one in five of those infected develops a mental illness within three months.

There was some concern that Trump's steroid treatment could affect his mental state. One expert commented: "Some patients may develop psychiatric symptoms after being treated with steroids including euphoria, mood instability, rage or psychosis. It is rare, but occurs often enough that we recognize them as undesirable side effects of steroid therapy." Professor of Emergency Medicine Esther Choo warned "we tell people that it can make them feel really hyper. It can make them behave very strangely." Among patients administered dexamethasone, about 30% develop "moderate psychiatric symptoms like anxiety, insomnia, mania, or delirium". About 6% develop psychosis.

After Trump left the hospital for a motorcade excursion and posted over a dozen all-caps tweets, it was speculated that the president was suffering from "steroid-induced psychosis". Megan Ranney, an emergency physician and professor at Brown University, told CNN's Wolf Blitzer: "I would never want to say the president is experiencing steroid-induced psychosis, but it is certainly concerning to see some of his actions today in the wake of this potentially deadly diagnosis and infectious disease."

According to reporting by Gabriel Sherman of Vanity Fair, Donald Trump Jr. expressed concerns on October 4 that the president was "acting crazy". Privately, White House aides had concerns about the effects of medications causing Trump's "animated mood". On October 5, Trump tweeted that he was "Feeling really good" and felt "better than I did 20 years ago", contributing to some speculation that his mental state was a side effect of medication.

On October 3, Trump issued an all-caps tweet calling for passage of a coronavirus stimulus bill. On October 4, it was publicly announced that Trump had been administered dexamethasone the previous day. On October 6, Trump unexpectedly announced on Twitter that he was halting negotiations on a stimulus bill. The announcement caused another sudden drop in the stock market, and Speaker Pelosi questioned if his steroid use was affecting his decision-making. Trump reversed this decision in another tweet sent seven hours later.

Commenting on the tweets, Dr. Choo observed: "Anytime he's doing a Twitter storm in all caps, it looks a little manic." Choo described Trump as a "presidential guinea pig" since "He's on all these medications, he's on that monoclonal antibody cocktail that we don't even know the side effects to, because it hasn't been well studied. Then he's on the Remdesivir, which is really a brand new medication in the context of COVID, which itself can cause alterations to your brain and your behaviour. And then add on the steroids."

On October 8, Speaker Pelosi announced plans for a meeting the following day to discuss the 25th Amendment.

== Reactions ==
The White House infections could have been prevented, according to Anthony Fauci, National Institute of Allergy and Infectious Diseases director and White House Coronavirus Task Force member. Arthur Caplan, a bioethicist at the NYU Grossman School of Medicine, has stated that the outbreak and specifically Trump's diagnosis would lead to more calls for transparency about Trump's health as well as conspiracy theories about how he was infected. Dr. Megan Ranney, a leading voice on personal protective equipment, said that Trump's infection was a "preventable but predictable national security risk". Julie Pryde, head of the Champaign-Urbana health district, said that the White House outbreak was preventable with basic infection-control measures.

Some medical experts noted that dexamethasone is typically administered in severe and critical cases of infection, to suppress an immune system overreaction that attacks vital organs which can lead to death. Dexamethasone has not been shown to be effective in milder cases of the disease. Others noted that such steroids can have mood-altering side effects ranging from depression to mania, even delirium and psychosis. There was also a risk of harmful drug interactions by administering several therapeutics at once. Some experts noted a so-called "VIP syndrome," in which a prominent patient insists on directing his own medical care, suggesting the president may have sought aggressive treatment without understanding the potential risks. As a Navy doctor, Conley is obliged to follow orders of the commander in chief. After Trump extensively promoted hydroxychloroquine as a defense against infection in spring 2020, Conley administered him a two-week regimen of the drug, despite no studies finding it was effective and it had potentially dangerous side effects.

=== United States public ===
The response from the U.S. public was mixed, and often split along ideological lines. Some supporters of Joe Biden said they were not surprised at the outbreak, due to a lack of precautions taken by Trump and other Republicans. Some people said they did not believe the diagnosis: some liberal doubters said they could not believe Trump due to the volume of false and misleading information that Trump had spread in the past, while some QAnon followers posited conspiracy theories asserting that Trump's diagnosis was "part of an elaborate plan to isolate the leader while violent retribution is taken against believed evil-doers." Comedian Michael Che wished Trump "a very lengthy recovery" on the Saturday Night Live news satire sketch Weekend Update.

An October 2–3 Reuters/Ipsos poll found that American disapproval of Trump's handling of the pandemic had increased from the previous week, with 65% of registered voters agreeing with the statement "if President Trump had taken coronavirus more seriously, he probably would not have been infected." Another poll on October 6 revealed that 21% of respondents were more likely to wear a mask due to the news of Trump acquiring the disease.

Twitter announced that any posts wishing for Trump's death would be removed for violating the platform's terms of service. Congresswomen Rashida Tlaib, Alexandria Ocasio-Cortez, Ilhan Omar, and Ayanna Pressley criticized Twitter for not taking threats against them seriously, pointing to longstanding posts calling for their deaths that had not been removed. Facebook and TikTok announced similar policies.

=== United States politicians ===
On October 2, Democratic presidential nominee Joe Biden said that he and Jill Biden send their "prayers for the health and safety" of Donald and Melania Trump. He took all of his negative political ads off the air following the announcement of Trump's diagnosis. His running mate Sen. Kamala Harris said that she and her husband Doug are sharing their "deepest prayers for the health and recovery of the president and the first lady." Former president Barack Obama extended his "best wishes" to Trump and said that he and Michelle Obama hope for a speedy recovery for the Trumps. House Speaker Nancy Pelosi said, "I always pray for the president and his family that they're safe" and said that she received the news with "great sadness". Senate Minority Leader Chuck Schumer wished Donald and Melania Trump and White House staffers a "speedy recovery".

Senate Majority Leader Mitch McConnell revealed he had not visited the White House since August 6 because of his private concerns that safety protocols were not being observed.

=== International politicians and leaders ===
Many politicians around the world expressed wishes for a quick recovery; others commented on the lack of response to the pandemic and the downplaying of the virus. Indian Prime Minister Narendra Modi, Israeli Prime Minister Benjamin Netanyahu, Philippine President Rodrigo Duterte, Russian President Vladimir Putin, British Prime Minister Boris Johnson and others issued statements of support over the outbreak through social media. Others were more critical of the outbreak; French government spokesman Gabriel Attal warned that the virus spared no one, even those skeptical about its reality and seriousness. Radoslaw Sikorski, a European Parliament member and former Polish foreign minister, tweeted that Trump should not try to treat himself with bleach, referring to Trump's earlier suggestion to try using disinfectants as a COVID-19 treatment "by injection inside or almost a cleaning."

=== Misinformation and conspiracy theories ===
Shortly after the announcement that Trump had tested positive, misinformation and conspiracy theories began proliferating social media. Many of the conspiracy theories were politically motivated, aided by conflicting and contradictory information announced to the public by the White House, the presidential medical team, and Trump himself (through his tweets).

Michael Moore promoted the conspiracy theory that Trump might be faking his diagnosis. Similar theories were posted on social media, postulating that Trump was feigning the illness so he could quickly recover and downplay the threat of COVID-19, delay the 2020 presidential election, or to distract the public from the reporting about his tax returns. Conversely, the vice presidential debate on October 7 triggered "a wave of speculation" that Pence might be symptomatic.

Some theories were spread by supporters of the QAnon conspiracy theory, who believe that COVID-19 is a narrative constructed by a Democratic Party deep state to seize power in the United States, and that Trump's positive diagnosis was tactical, as part of a larger plan to arrest Hillary Clinton.

== List of COVID-19 infections and notable exposures ==
White House personnel held multiple events in the days prior to the outbreak. On Sep 26, a nomination event for Judge Barrett was held. The following day, Gold Star families attended an event. White House personnel traveled to Ohio to attend the first presidential debate, as well as campaign events in Duluth and Bedminster, New Jersey. On Nov 3, prior to the second outbreak, a watch party was held in the East Room of the White House.

=== People who tested positive for COVID-19 ===
Timeline of event attendance by people who have tested positive for COVID-19
		Was event attended by the patient?						Severity	Diagnosis first reported publicly
Location and event:		Barrett nomination	Gold Star Day	Ohio debate	Duluth rally	Bedminster fundraiser	Election Night party	Severity	Diagnosis first reported publicly
Patient	Position	Sep 26	Sep 27	Sep 29	Sep 30	Oct 1	Nov 3	Severity	Diagnosis first reported publicly
Unidentified staffers	White House staffers	Exact presence unknown						Positive	Sep 16
Donald Trump	President of the United States	Symptomatic and COVID-positive on Sept 26						Hospitalized; discharged	Oct 2
Crede Bailey	Head of White House Security Office	Became ill over Labor Day weekend (Sep 5–7), diagnosed before Barrett nomination event, hospitalized in late September						Hospitalized; permanently disabled	Oct 6
Hope Hicks	Senior Counselor to the President			Yes	Yes	Isolating	Unknown	Positive and symptomatic	Oct 1
Mike Lee	US Senator from Utah	Yes						Positive and symptomatic	Oct 2
Thom Tillis	US Senator from North Carolina	Yes						Positive and symptomatic	Oct 2
Melania Trump	First Lady	Yes	Yes	Yes			Yes	Positive and symptomatic	Oct 2
Kellyanne Conway	Fmr. Counselor to the President	Yes					Unknown	Positive and symptomatic	Oct 2
Ronna McDaniel	Chair of the RNC	Attended D.C. fundraiser with Trump on Sep 25						Positive and symptomatic	Oct 2
Michael D. Shear & wife	The New York Times correspondent	Visited the White House on Sep 26 before a trip to Pennsylvania aboard Air Force One, which he then took with the president.						Positive and symptomatic	Oct 2
Bill Stepien	Trump campaign manager	Traveled to Cleveland debate aboard Air Force One with President, First Lady, Hope Hicks, and Stephen Miller					Unknown	Positive and symptomatic	Oct 2
Al Drago	White House press room photojournalist	Yes						Positive and symptomatic	Oct 2
One unidentified journalist	White House press room journalist	Yes	Unknown					Positive	Oct 2
11 unidentified persons	Debate preparation staff or media			Yes				Positive	Oct 2
Nick Luna	Body man to Donald Trump				Yes	Canceled	Unknown	Positive	Oct 3
Chris Christie	Former Governor of New Jersey	Yes	Also in close contact with Trump at a Sep 26 meeting, debate prep meetings, and a Sep 27 press conference					Hospitalized; discharged	Oct 3
John I. Jenkins	University of Notre Dame President	Yes						Positive and symptomatic	Oct 3
Ron Johnson	US Senator from Wisconsin	Exposed to unnamed individual on Sep 14						Positive but asymptomatic	Oct 3
Claudia Conway	Daughter of Kellyanne Conway	Exposed to Kellyanne Conway						Positive and symptomatic	Oct 4
Kayleigh McEnany	White House press secretary	Yes			Yes	Canceled	Unknown	Positive but asymptomatic	Oct 5
Greg Laurie	Pastor of Harvest Christian Fellowship	Yes						Positive and symptomatic	Oct 5
Chad Gilmartin	Principal assistant press secretary	Yes						Positive	Oct 5
Karoline Leavitt	Assistant press secretary	Yes						Positive and symptomatic	Oct 5
Two unidentified staffers	White House residence staff	Regularly exposed to First Family						Positive	Oct 5
Jayna McCarron	U.S. Coast Guard aide to the president	Regularly exposed to Trump						Positive	Oct 6
Unidentified military personnel	President's valet	Regularly exposed to Trump						Positive	Oct 6
Adm. Charles Ray	Vice Commandant of the Coast Guard		Yes					Positive and symptomatic	Oct 6
Jalen Drummond	Assistant White House Press Secretary	Yes						Positive	Oct 6
Stephen Miller	Senior Advisor to the President			Yes			Unknown	Positive	Oct 6
Salud Carbajal	U.S. Representative from CA-24	Reportedly exposed to Sen. Mike Lee						Positive and symptomatic	Oct 6
Harrison W. Fields	Assistant press secretary	Regularly exposed to Press Secretary Kayleigh McEnany						Positive	Oct 7
Gen. Gary Thomas	Marine Corps assistant commandant	Exposed to Admiral Charles Ray						Positive and symptomatic	Oct 7
Mike Bost	US Representative from IL-12	Exposed to Mike Lee						Positive and symptomatic	Oct 9
Trish Scalia	Wife of Labor Secretary Eugene Scalia	Yes						Positive and symptomatic	Oct 14
Barron Trump	Son of Donald & Melania Trump	Announced Oct 14, diagnosed on Oct 1 along with parents						Positive	Oct 14
Marc Short	Pence Chief of Staff	Regularly in close contact with VP Mike Pence					Isolating	Positive	Oct 24
Marty Obst	Pence advisor	Regularly in close contact with VP Mike Pence						Positive	Oct 24
Zach Bauer	Body man to Pence	Regularly in close contact with VP Mike Pence					Unknown	Positive	Oct 24
Two unidentified staffers	Members of Pence's staff	Regularly in contact with VP Mike Pence						Positive	Oct 24
Mark Meadows	White House Chief of Staff	Yes		Yes	Travels with Trump on "almost every trip"		Yes	Positive	Nov 6
Cassidy Hutchinson	Aide to Mark Meadows	Regularly in contact with Chief of Staff Mark Meadows						Positive	Nov 6
Five unidentified staffers	Members of Trump's staff	Regularly in contact with President Trump						Positive	Nov 6
Nick Trainor	Trump campaign battleground director	Regularly in contact with President Trump						Positive	Nov 6
Unknown campaign staffer	Member of Trump campaign staff	Regularly in contact with President Trump						Positive	Nov 6
Charlton Boyd	Aide to Jared Kushner	Regularly in contact with Jared Kushner						Positive	Nov 7
Matt Gaetz	US Representative from FL-01	Present at Trump rallies on Oct 16, Oct 19, and Oct 23. Unmasked in close contact with Trump campaign on Nov 3						Asymptomatic, positive for antibodies	Nov 7
Ben Carson	HUD secretary	Exposed to Trump at campaign event in Atlanta on Sep 25.					Yes	"Desperately ill"	Nov 9
Several staffers	White House staffers	Many were presumably attendees at Trump's Election Night party on Nov 3.						Positive	Nov 9
David Bossie	Head of Citizens United	Yes					Yes	Positive	Nov 9
Brian Jack	White House Political Director						Yes	Positive	Nov 11
Healy Baumgardner	2016 Trump campaign spokesperson						Yes	Positive	Nov 11
Corey Lewandowski	2016 Trump campaign manager	Attended Four Seasons Total Landscaping event on Nov 7					Yes	Positive	Nov 12
Jeff Miller	Republican strategist						Yes	Positive	Nov 12
Richard Walters	RNC Chief of staff							Positive	Nov 12
≥30 Secret Service officers	Officers assigned the president's detail	Regularly exposed to President Trump						Positive	Nov 13
Chuck Grassley	US Senator from Iowa	Attended Trump rally on Nov 1 in Dubuque, Iowa						Positive but asymptomatic	Nov 17
Andrew Giuliani	White House aide, Rudy's son	Golfs with Trump, attended Rudy Giuliani press conference on November 19						Positive	Nov 20
Rick Scott	US Senator from Florida	Attended Trump rally on November 2						Positive and symptomatic	Nov 20
Donald Trump Jr.	Son of Donald Trump			Yes	Attended Nov 1 rally in Dubuque		Yes	Positive but asymptomatic	Nov 20
Donald Trump Jr.	Son of Donald Trump	Regular contact with Donald Trump and Kimberly Guilfoyle						Positive but asymptomatic	Nov 20
Kelly Loeffler	US Senator from Georgia	Attended rally with Rick Scott and David Perdue on November 13						Positive	Nov 21
Boris Epshteyn	2020 Trump campaign strategic advisor	Attended Rudy Giuliani press conference on November 19						Positive and symptomatic	Nov 25
Rudy Giuliani	Fmr. NYC mayor; Trump's personal attorney	Exposed to Andrew Giuliani and others. Appeared unmasked before Michigan lawmakers on Dec 2 and Georgia lawmakers on Dec 3						Hospitalized; discharged	Dec 6
Jenna Ellis	Trump campaign attorney	Regularly exposed to Rudy Giuliani. Attended Christmas party for Senior White House staff unmasked on December 4.						Positive	Dec 8
Devin Nunes	US Representative from CA-22							Asymptomatic, positive for antibodies	Dec 11
David Bernhardt	Interior secretary	Regularly in close contact with others in White House. May have attended Christmas parties in White House.						Positive	Dec 17

=== Notable exposures ===
Timeline of notable exposures to the White House COVID-19 outbreak
		Did the exposed individual attend the event?						Current status
Location and event:		Barrett nomination	Gold Star Day	Ohio debate	Duluth rally	Bedminster fundraiser	Election Night party	Current status
Exposed Individual	Position	Sep 26	Sep 27	Sep 29	Sep 30	Oct 1	Nov 3	Current status
Jared Kushner	Trump advisor, son-in-law	Yes		Yes	Yes	Canceled	Unknown	Negative
Ivanka Trump	Trump advisor, daughter	Yes		Yes	Yes	Canceled	Yes	Negative
Eric Trump	Son of Donald Trump			Yes			Yes	Negative
Lara Trump	Wife of Eric Trump			Yes			Yes	Negative
Dan Scavino	Deputy Chief of Staff for Communications				Yes	Canceled	Unknown	Negative
Mike Pence	Vice President of the United States	Yes	Yes				Yes	Reportedly negative
Karen Pence	Second Lady of the United States	Yes	Yes				Yes	Negative
William Barr	Attorney General	Yes						Negative, quarantined
Amy Coney Barrett	Federal appellate judge, Supreme Court nominee	Yes						Negative (previously infected)
Alex Azar	Secretary of Health and Human Services	Yes ^{[I]}	Also exposed to Trump on Sep 28 at an event announcing a COVID-19 testing initiative.				Yes	Negative
Joe Biden	Former Vice President			Yes				Negative
Jill Biden	Former Second Lady			Yes				Negative
Eugene Scalia	Secretary of Labor	Yes						Negative
Ben Sasse	US Senator from Nebraska	Yes						Negative
Deb Fischer	US Senator from Nebraska	Yes						Negative
Kelly Loeffler	US Senator from Georgia	Yes						Negative
Josh Hawley	US Senator from Missouri	Yes						Negative
Harry R. Jackson Jr.	Pentecostal bishop	Yes	Attended Trump events on Oct 6 in Cleveland Heights, on Oct 15 in Miami, and on Oct 23 in Raleigh					Deceased by Nov 9
Jim Jordan	US Representative from OH-04			Yes				Negative
Chris Coons	US Senator from Delaware			Yes				Negative
Lisa Blunt Rochester	US Representative from DE-AL			Yes				Negative
Chris Wallace	Fox News anchor, debate moderator			Yes				Negative
Tiffany Trump	Daughter of Donald Trump			Yes			Yes	Unknown
Kimberly Guilfoyle	Trump advisor, partner of Donald Trump Jr.			Yes			Yes	Unknown (previously infected)
Pat Cipollone	White House Counsel	Yes						Unknown
Rudy Giuliani	Former Mayor of New York City, Trump advisor			Yes			Unknown^{[I]}	Underwent prophylactic treatment
Rudy Giuliani	Former Mayor of New York City, Trump advisor	Giuliani participated in debate prep with Trump and Christie and later exhibited a cough. In a later interview, Giuliani reported undergoing prophylactic treatment.						Underwent prophylactic treatment
Mike Crapo	US Senator from Idaho	Yes						Unknown
Marsha Blackburn	US Senator from Tennessee	Yes						Unknown
Mark Esper	Secretary of Defense		Yes					Unknown
Gen. Mark Milley	Chairman of the Joint Chiefs of Staff		Yes					Unknown
Joni Ernst	US Senator from Iowa	Exposed to Sen. Mike Lee on Oct 1 at Judiciary Committee meeting.						Negative
Tate Reeves	Governor of Mississippi	Exposed to Trump on Sep 28 at an event announcing a COVID-19 testing initiative						Negative
Mike Turner	US Representative from OH-10	Exposed to Trump on Sep 28 at event featuring Lordstown Motors						Negative
Robert B. Ford	CEO of Abbott Laboratories	Exposed to Trump on Sep 28 at an event announcing a COVID-19 testing initiative						Negative
Betsy DeVos	Secretary of Education	Exposed to Trump on Sep 28 at an event announcing a COVID-19 testing initiative						Negative
Steven Mnuchin	Secretary of the Treasury	Exposed to Trump on Sep 30 at an Oval Office meeting					Yes	Negative
Jason Miller	Trump re-election campaign senior advisor	Traveled to Cleveland for the Presidential Debate aboard Air Force One					Unknown	Negative
Paula Reid	CBS News White House correspondent	Exposed to Kayleigh McEnany and another staffer at press briefing on Oct 1						Awaiting results
Rob Portman	US Senator from Ohio	Exposed to Trump on Sep 28 at event featuring Lordstown Motors						Unknown
Peter Navarro	Director of the OTMP	Exposed to Trump on Sep 28 at event featuring Lordstown Motors						Unknown
Gen. John E. Hyten	Vice Chairman of the Joint Chiefs of Staff	Quarantined after exposure to Adm. Charles Ray.						Unknown
Gen. James C. McConville	Chief of Staff of the Army	Suspected quarantined after exposure to Adm. Charles Ray.						Unknown
Gen. David H. Berger	Commandant of the Marine Corps	Suspected quarantined after exposure to Adm. Charles Ray.						Unknown
Gen. Charles Q. Brown Jr.	Chief of Staff of the Air Force	Quarantined after exposure to Adm. Charles Ray.						Unknown
Gen. John W. Raymond	Chief of Space Operations	Quarantined after exposure to Adm. Charles Ray.						Unknown
Gen. Daniel R. Hokanson	Chief of the National Guard Bureau	Suspected to be quarantined after exposure to Adm. Charles Ray.						Unknown
Adm. Mike Gilday	Chief of Naval Operations	Suspected to be quarantined after exposure to Adm. Charles Ray.						Unknown
Gen. Paul Nakasone	Director of the NSA	Suspected to be quarantined after exposure to Adm. Charles Ray.						Unknown
Robert C. O'Brien	National Security Advisor	Yes	Traveled to Cleveland for the Presidential Debate aboard Air Force One					Unknown (previously infected)
Todd Ricketts	Co-owner of Chicago Cubs, RNC finance chair	Exposed to Trump and McDaniel at the Sep 25 fundraiser						Unknown
Thomas O. Hicks Jr.	Co-chair of the RNC	Exposed to Trump and McDaniel at the Sep 25 fundraiser						Unknown
Michael Boulos	Business executive, partner of Tiffany Trump						Yes	Unknown

== Timeline of events ==
=== June–September 2020 ===
- June 20: Trump rally in Tulsa attended by over 6,000. Hicks, Cain, two Secret Service agents, two staffers, and a journalist later test positive.
- July 30: Death of Herman Cain
- August 17: Trump rally at Mankato, Minnesota attended by 500
- August 20: Trump rally at Lackawanna, Pennsylvania attended by several hundred
- September 5–7: Crede Bailey, head of the White House Security Office, fell ill with COVID-19.
- September 13: Trump rally at Henderson, Nevada attended by 5,000.
- September 16: At least one unnamed staffer tests positive
- September 17: Trump rally at Mosinee, Wisconsin attended by thousands
- September 18: Trump rally at Bemidji, Montana attended by thousands, 16 attendees test positive, two hospitalized
- September 24: Pence and Ivanka Trump attend event at Minnesota hotel; three attendees test positive
- September 26
  - 150 guests attend Rose Garden ceremony nominating Amy Coney Barrett; a reception follows. At least 18 attendees tested positive.
  - Trump exhibits symptoms and tests positive for COVID-19.
  - Trump rally at Middletown, Pennsylvania attended by thousands
  - Debate prep team meets at the White House. At least seven team members later tested positive
- September 27
  - Golfing
  - Reception for 40 Gold Star families, at least three attendees later tested positive
  - Debate prep team meets at the White House
- September 28
  - Debate prep team meets at the White House
  - Press conference announcing a new COVID-19 testing initiative
- September 29
  - Debate prep team meets at the White House
  - First presidential debate in Cleveland, Ohio; Trump arrives late and avoids COVID-19 test. At least four attendees later tested positive
- September 30
  - Private fundraiser in Shorewood attended by about 40 guests
  - Duluth rally attended by 2,500 people. At least four White House personnel in attendance later test positive
  - Hope Hicks quarantined
  - Crede Bailey hospitalized in late September

=== October 2020 ===
==== October 1–15 ====
- October 1, three known cases:

Press Secretary Kayleigh McEnany holds a press briefing, despite knowledge of exposure, October 1, 2020. Video from White House.

  - Kayleigh McEnany holds press briefing despite knowledge of exposure; she later tested positive.
  - Fundraiser at Bedminster golf club in New Jersey is attended by 200; two White House team members in attendance later test positive
  - Trump tests positive
  - Hope Hicks diagnosis revealed by Bloomberg News
  - Sean Hannity appearance
  - Stephen Miller begins self-quarantine.
  - Eric Trump holds rally in Rothschild, Wisconsin
- October 2, 25+ known cases:
  - Trump announces his diagnosis via Twitter
  - Trump airlifted to Walter Reed
- October 3, 28+ known cases: Trump in hospital
  - Chris Christie hospitalized
- October 4, 28+ known cases: Trump in hospital, motorcade excursion
  - Barr enters quarantine
  - Jared Kushner and Ivanka Trump photographed exercising while masked; the two are not publicly seen in the coming days.
- October 5, 32+ known cases: Trump returns to White House
  - Giuliani interviewed while exhibiting cough
- October 6, 35+ known cases:
  - Admiral Charles Ray, Coast Guard aide to the President Jayna McCarron, and an unnamed military person who serves as valet to the President test positive
  - Joint Chiefs of Staff self-quarantine due to exposure via Admiral Ray
  - White House aide Stephen Miller and Assistant Press Secretary Jalen Drummond's positive test is announced
- October 7, 36+ known cases:
  - General Gary Thomas tests positive
  - Rudy Giuliani reveals he is undergoing 'prophylactic' treatment
  - Vice presidential debate
- October 8
  - The Commission on Presidential Debates announces that the second debate will be held in a virtual format, due to Trump's COVID diagnosis
  - Donald Trump Jr. holds a tightly packed indoor rally in Florida
  - Pence cancels events and returns to D.C.
- October 10
  - White House holds event on the South Lawn where Trump appears on balcony to address hundreds of attendees.
  - Pence returns to campaign with events in Orlando and at The Villages .
- October 12
  - White House physician reports Trump has tested negative for COVID-19.
  - Trump attends campaign rally at Orlando Sanford International Airport in Sanford, Florida .
- October 13: Trump rally at John Murtha Johnstown-Cambria County Airport in Cambria County, Pennsylvania .
- October 14: Trump rally at Des Moines International Airport in Des Moines, Iowa .
- October 15: Trump rally at Pitt–Greenville Airport in Greenville, North Carolina .

==== October 16–31 ====
- October 16
  - Trump rally at Ocala International Airport in Marion County, Florida . Rep. Matt Gaetz, who would later test positive for antibodies, was in attendance.
  - Trump rally at Middle Georgia Regional Airport in Bibb County, Georgia .
- October 18: Trump rally at Carson City Airport in Carson City, Nevada .
- October 19
  - Trump rally at Prescott Regional Airport in Prescott, Arizona .
  - Trump rally at Tucson International Airport in Tucson, Arizona .
- October 20
  - Trump rally at Erie International Airport in Erie, Pennsylvania .
  - Melania Trump cancelled her first schedule appearance since developing symptoms, citing a "lingering cough".
- October 21: Trump rally at Gastonia Municipal Airport in Gaston County, North Carolina.
- October 22: Final presidential debate in Nashville, Tennessee
- October 23
  - Trump rally at The Villages Polo Club in Sumter County, Florida.
  - Trump rally at Pensacola International Airport in Escambia County, Florida. Rep Matt Gaetz spoke and signed autographs; He would later develop antibodies.
- October 24
  - Trump rally at Pickaway Agriculture and Event Center in Pickaway County, Ohio.
  - Trump rally at Waukesha County Airport in Waukesha County, Wisconsin.
  - Five aides to Pence test positive.
- October 25
  - Trump rally at Manchester–Boston Regional Airport in Manchester, New Hampshire.
- October 26
  - Trump rally at Lancaster Airport in Lancaster County, Pennsylvania.
  - Trump rally at Altoona–Blair County Airport in Blair County, Pennsylvania.
- October 27
  - Trump rally at Capital Region International Airport in Clinton County, Michigan.
  - Trump rally at La Crosse Fairgrounds Speedway in West Salem, Wisconsin.
  - Trump rally at Eppley Airfield in Douglas County, Nebraska.
- October 28
  - Trump rally at Laughlin/Bullhead International Airport in Mohave County, Arizona.
  - Trump rally at Phoenix Goodyear Airport in Maricopa County, Arizona.

=== November 2020 ===
- November 1
  - Thousands gather at Dubuque Regional Airport, Iowa for a Trump rally. Chuck Grassley and Donald Trump Jr. would later test positive.
  - Tightly packed Trump rally at Rome, Georgia draws 30,000. Senators David Perdue and Kelly Loeffler attended; Loeffler would later test positive.
  - Rally at Opa-Locka Airport in Miami draws thousands. Two attendees, Sen. Rick Scott and Carlos Gimenez, would later test positive.
- November 2: Thousands attend Trump Rally at Kenosha Airport in Wisconsin. Donald Trump Jr. would later test positive.
- November 3: About 200 attended election night event in the White House East Room; Mark Meadows, David Bossie, Ben Carson, Brian Jack, Corey Lewandowski and Donald Trump Jr. would later test positive.
- November 5: Trump rally at Republican headquarters in Atlanta; Donald Trump Jr. would later test positive.
- November 6: Mark Meadows tests positive for coronavirus.
- November 7
  - Florida's house representative Matt Gaetz tests positive for coronavirus antibody but not the live virus, indicating that he was infected with coronavirus at some point in the past.
  - The Trump Campaign holds an event at Four Seasons Total Landscaping. Corey Lewandoski would later test positive.
  - Joe Biden projected winner of the 2020 presidential election
- November 8: Trump campaign advisor David Bossie tests positive for COVID-19. Bossie had been placed in charge of the Trump campaign post-election strategy the week prior when Mark Meadows' COVID-19 status was made public.
- November 9: Secretary of HUD Ben Carson tests positive for coronavirus. He had been in attendance at the November 3 election night event at the White House.
- November 11: White House political director Brian Jack is revealed to have tested positive for coronavirus over the previous weekend. Jack was also at the White House election night event.
- November 12: Corey Lewandowski, a Trump campaign advisor working on the post-election legal team, is revealed to have tested positive for coronavirus on Wed Nov 11. Lewandowski was present at the election night party following which several other White House staff and Trump campaign workers have received a COVID-19 diagnosis.
- November 13: Rick Scott attends packed event for Loeffler and Perdue at Black Diamond Grill in Cummings, Georgia. Scott reportedly entered quarantine after returning to Florida. Loeffler would later test positive.
- November 15: Donald Trump Jr. tests positive "at the start of the week".
- November 17: Chuck Grassley reports testing positive.
- November 19: Giuliani holds press conference. Three attendees, Andrew Giuliani, Boris Epshteyn, and Christianné Allen would later test positive.
- November 20
  - White House aide Andrew Giuliani, Senator Rick Scott, and Donald Trump Jr. revealed to have tested positive for COVID-19
  - Pence holds rally with David Perdue and Kelly Loeffler in Canton, Georgia. Loeffler would report testing positive the following day.
- November 21: Senate candidate Kelly Loeffler reports testing positive.
- November 25: Boris Epshteyn reported to have tested positive for COVID-19. After hosting a public meeting in Gettysburg, Mastriano attends White House meeting where he receives news of positive test results.
- November 27: Florida member-elect of the US House Carlos Gimenez reported to have tested positive.
- November 29: Pennsylvania state senator Doug Mastriano reported to have tested positive.
- November 30: Giuliani meets, unmasked, with Arizona lawmakers.

=== December 2020 ===
- December 2: Giuliani appears unmasked before Michigan lawmakers.
- December 3: Giuliani appears unmasked before Georgia lawmakers.
- December 5: Trump, Perdue, and Loeffler attend a rally in Valdosta, Georgia.
- December 6: Giuliani reported to have tested positive.

== See also ==
- 2020 Trump Tulsa rally
- List of 2020 Donald Trump campaign rallies
- List of presidential trips made by Donald Trump since September 2020
- COVID-19 pandemic in the United States
- October surprise, a news event that may influence the outcome of an upcoming election
- Trump administration communication during the COVID-19 pandemic
- Twenty-fifth Amendment to the United States Constitution
- Attempted assassination of Ronald Reagan, a previous event in which a sitting President's health was at risk
- Luke Letlow, U.S. Representative–elect (LA-5) who died of COVID-19 in December 2020 before taking office
- U.S. Representative Ron Wright, first sitting member of Congress to die of COVID-19
