= Howard Forman =

Howard Forman may refer to:

- Howard Forman (politician), member of the Florida Senate
- Howard P. Forman, professor at Yale University
