= Howard P. Forman =

- Occupations: Radiologist; Professor of Radiology, Economics, Public health, and Management

Academic background
- Education: MBA, University of Pennsylvania; MD, SUNY Stony Brook; BS, The City College of New York

Howard P. Forman is a professor of radiology, economics, public health, and management at Yale University. Forman is known for his commentary on the U.S. government's response to the COVID-19 pandemic, his political and healthcare writing on Twitter, and his role in developing national leaders in healthcare.

== Career ==
Forman founded Yale’s MD/MBA program and directs both the Yale School of Public Health’s Health Care Management program and the Yale School of Management’s Executive MBA program (health care track). He is the only Yale faculty member to hold simultaneous appointments in the School of Medicine, School of Management, Economics Department, and School of Public Health. His academic work is centered on issues related to financial administration, healthcare compliance, and contracting. His research has focused on improving imaging services delivery through better access to information. He has served as a legislative aide in the U.S. Senate on Medicare legislation. He led a group, working with Megan Ranney, Liz Fowler, Timothy Jost, Kavita Patel, and others that submitted recommendations to Congress on a broad array of policy proposals targeting the COVID pandemic and economic and health response.

Forman's former students include Vivek Murthy, the 19th Surgeon General of the United States; Kate Goodrich, former chief medical officer for the Centers for Medicare & Medicaid Services; and Michael Sherling, co-founder of Modernizing Medicine. Marcella Nunez-Smith is also a former student, with whom he co-founded the Pozen-Commonwealth Fund Fellowship in Health Equity Leadership at Yale University.

== Honors and awards ==
Leah Lowenstein Award, Yale School of Medicine.

Evens Society Award, Mallinckrodt Institute of Radiology.

Radiology Alliance for Health Service Research Achievement Award, Association of Academic Radiologists.

Yale School of Public Health Mentor of the Year Award

== Public Outreach ==
Forman co-hosts a podcast with fellow Yale professor Harlan Krumholz, Health & Veritas on the latest news and ideas in healthcare. They have featured guests, including Esther Choo, Eric Topol, Akiko Iwasaki, James Hamblin, Farzad Mostashari and Katherine Baicker. During the COVID-19 pandemic, he tracked outbreaks at local, national, and international levels; expounding on mitigation strategies and engaging to dispel misinformation through social and print media. He has been a frequent guest commentator and expert on national video and audio platforms.
