= Elizabeth Fowler =

Elizabeth Fowler may refer to:

- Elizabeth Fowler (lawyer), American lawyer
- Elizabeth Fowler (archaeologist), British archaeologist
- Eliza Haywood (c. 1693–1756), born Elizabeth Fowler, English writer, actress and publisher
- Lilian Fowler (Elizabeth Lilian Maud Fowler, 1886–1954), Australian politician
- Beth Fowler (born 1940), American actress and singer
