= Healy Baumgardner =

American political advisor (born 1979)

- Born: Healy Ernst Baumgardner; October 10, 1979 (age 46); Glen Dale, West Virginia
- Occupation: Political advisor

Healy Baumgardner (born 10 October 1979) is an American political advisor. She served as an advisor to Donald Trump's 2016 presidential campaign.

== Early life ==
Born in Glen Dale, West Virginia, Healy E. Baumgardner's family had ties to both Republican politics and the private sector.

== Career ==
Baumgardner served as a senior communications advisor and spokesperson for Donald Trump's 2016 presidential campaign.

Prior to her involvement with Trump’s campaign, she was the deputy communications director for Rudy Giuliani's 2008 presidential campaign. Giuliani withdrew from the race following the Florida primary. She also served as a spokesperson for the Department of Energy in George W. Bush's administration.

She later founded the lobbying firm 45 Energy Group. The group has collected $250,000 from the government of Malaysia to arrange meetings between officials and $425,000 from a foreign group seeking support for an Uzbekistan ethane/methane project. The latter project became a focal point in the President Donald Trump's impeachment inquiry. Businessman Lev Parnas had recruited Baumgardner and Rudy Giuliani to create the perception that Trump lent his support. Giuliani planned to visit Uzbekistan in May 2019, though the trip was later cancelled, with Baumgardner alleging that this was due to discovery of the project's ties to the Chinese government. As part of their inquiry into the Trump administration's dealings in Ukraine, the House Intelligence, Foreign Affairs, and Oversight and Reform Committees subpoenaed Giuliani for documents relating to the Uzbekistan project. Baumgardner stated that the 45 Group was acting legally and ethically, and criticized the investigation as a "witch hunt."

Baumgardner attended Donald Trump's 2020 Election Day party at the White House as a guest of Giuliani. On November 11, 2020, Bloomberg News reported that she had tested positive for COVID-19, as did several others who attended.
