= Harlan Krumholz =

American cardiologist

- Occupations: Cardiologist; Harold H. Hines, Jr. Professor of Medicine

Academic background
- Education: Yale University (BS); Harvard University (MD)

Harlan M. Krumholz is an American cardiologist, scientist, and the Harold H. Hines, Jr. Professor of Medicine at Yale School of Medicine, where he has been on faculty since 1992. A pioneer in the development of the field of outcomes research, Krumholz is an international expert in the science to evaluate and improve the quality and efficiency of care, reduce disparities, improve integrity in medical research, promote better health policies and regulations, and promote patient-centeredness in research and clinical care. He is the founder and director of the Yale New Haven Hospital Center for Outcomes Research and Evaluation (CORE).

== Early life and education ==
Krumholz was born in St. Louis, Missouri and attended Meadowdale High School in Dayton, Ohio. He graduated magna cum laude with a Bachelor of Science degree in Biology from Yale College in 1980. He earned his medical degree from Harvard University in 1985, where his advisor was Lee Goldman. He completed residency in Internal Medicine at the University of California, San Francisco, where he was Chief Resident in 1989. He completed his cardiology fellowship at Beth Israel Hospital in Boston.

== Career ==
=== Original Research ===
Krumholz has published more than 1500 articles and has an h-index >240. He is consistently on Clarivate's list of the most Highly Cited Researchers. His discoveries and their application have impacted the approach to disparities, sex and gender research, the evaluation of digital health tools, the utilization and organization of novel, real-world data sources, the definition of clinical conditions, and recovery after hospitalization. In many cases, these investigations required the development of new methodological approaches or novel strategies for implementation. The driving themes of his work are to improve the effectiveness, efficiency, equity, patient-centeredness, safety, and timeliness of health care. His work has pioneered new assays to evaluate clinical care and novel methods to identify strategies to improve care and position patients to achieve better outcomes.

With statisticians, mathematicians, and computer scientists, Krumholz is currently exploring the ways that AI and machine learning techniques have the capacity to transform clinical medicine by leveraging digital real-world data. This includes the application of data from electronic health records to quality improvement research; the use of machine learning models for individualized assessments of patient risk, such as the ability to better identify which patients may be more likely to develop complications after surgery, or those who may be more likely to be readmitted to the hospital after hospitalization for heart failure; and investigation of the role that wearable devices might have in improving care for chronic conditions such as high blood pressure.

Development of Outcomes Research

Krumholz has played a major role in developing the field of outcomes research and expanding it into cardiovascular research. He founded/co-founded the American Heart Association's (AHA's) Quality of Care and Outcomes Research Annual Conference and the AHA Quality of Care and Outcomes Research Council. He was the founding editor of Circulation: Cardiovascular Quality and Outcomes and a founding Governor of the Patient-Centered Outcomes Research Institute. Krumholz has contributed to training the next generation of investigators in the field, including leadership of a K12 faculty program in outcomes research at Yale sponsored by the Agency for Healthcare Research and Quality.

Quality Improvement

Krumholz has played a leading role in improving the quality of care, particularly for people with cardiovascular disease. He was a central figure with the national Health Care Financing Administration's (now CMS) Cooperative Cardiovascular Project, which pioneered the evaluation of care practices nationwide and initiated programs to address shortfalls. Initial results showed that most patients were not treated according to the best evidence and national practice guidelines. The work resulted in partnerships with the American College of Cardiology, the AHA, hospital consortia, and others to initiate programs to improve care. Notably, the performance indicators, such as the use of aspirin and beta-blockers, improved and death rates declined.

Krumholz's work to improve the timeliness of heart attack care was a particular success. The use of medications and procedures to open arteries that had suddenly closed and were causing a heart attack was a major advance. However, the therapy's success depended on the speed with which treatment could be provided. In the early 2000s, more than a decade after these treatments became mainstream, there was evidence of marked delays in treatment, mitigating the potential benefits. Krumholz, leveraging a grant from the National Institutes of Health, collaborated with Elizabeth Bradley and a multidisciplinary team to identify factors responsible for the delays. They developed a mixed-methods approach based on identifying positive deviance, and ultimately identified several key actions that could reliably improve times. Krumholz then led the American College of Cardiology's Door-to-Balloon Alliance, a national initiative to improve the time from when the patient arrived at the hospital to the time that definitive treatment to open the artery was provided. The effort, in concert with the AHA's Mission: Lifeline, dramatically reduced treatment times nationwide.

Krumholz has also led efforts to develop metrics used by the federal government and professional societies to measure, publicly report, and improve health care. The goals of public reporting are to provide information to American consumers who are making healthcare decisions, and to encourage hospitals to evaluate and improve the quality of patient care. This wide-ranging work included the evaluation of trends in care for several common conditions and procedures such as stroke, heart attack, heart failure, pneumonia, and joint replacement; the examination of disparities in access to and quality of care; and the investigation of geographic variation in quality of care. He led measures that were ultimately incorporated into federal legislation, including the Affordable Care Act, to publicly report clinical performance and provide incentives for high-quality care. In China, Krumholz launched national collaborations with the National Center for Cardiovascular Diseases in Beijing and with Fuwai Hospital, one of China's leading cardiovascular institutions.

Open Science

Krumholz is a vocal proponent of open science and initiated the Institute of Medicine's first meeting on the topic. He co-founded, with Joseph Ross, the Yale Open Data Access (YODA) Project, which began by facilitating the sharing of Medtronic trial data. The principles of the sharing were that anyone could request the data, the requirement was that there was a pre-specified research question, and that Medtronic could not play a role in deciding about data access. Although Medtronic did not continue data sharing, YODA is now the platform that shares all the Johnson & Johnson clinical trial data, as well as some others.

Training

Krumholz has participated in the training of a generation of clinical scientists and policymakers, many of whom hold prominent positions in academia, government, and industry. He led the Robert Wood Johnson Foundation Clinical Scholars Program—the Foundation's flagship training program—at Yale from 1996 until it was sunset in 2017. In 2003, he led the Program's transition from a traditional academic fellowship to one that emphasized partnerships across the healthcare ecosystem and particularly with patients—as well as a focus on translating scholarship to improve people's health.

Disparities and Equity

Krumholz has produced hundreds of studies on the topic of disparity and equity, and gaps in quality and outcomes by sex, race/ethnicity, and geography. In 2007, he launched the VIRGO study (Variation in Recovery: Role of Gender on Outcomes in Young Patients with AMI). VIRGO, funded by the National Institutes of Health, produced considerable scholarship on factors leading to disparities in risk. Krumholz also introduced the idea that differential mortality by race/ethnicity in the United States should be a federal metric for which the country should be accountable.

Integrity

Krumholz has been a proponent of better ethical standards in medicine and was at the forefront of discussions surrounding greater disclosure of potential conflicts of interest. He participated in Vioxx litigation on behalf of plaintiffs and testified in several high-profile trials with attorney Mark Lanier. The litigation, and the discovery, led to several seminal publications on ethical breaches by researchers and industry. He has also participated in litigation with the US Department of Justice related to the inappropriate use of Implantable Cardiac Defibrillators.

Publishing

Krumholz is the Editor-in-Chief of JACC (Journal of the American College of Cardiology). He was the founding editor of Circulation: Cardiovascular Quality and Outcomes, serving from 2008–2016. He was the editor of Journal Watch Cardiology, a publication of the Massachusetts Medical Society, and was the founding editor of CardioExchange, a practice community of the New England Journal of Medicine for medical professionals. He sits on many editorial boards and is on the advisory committee of Springer, the publisher of the Nature journals. He leads the podcast Health and Veritas with Howard Forman. Krumholz is the author of two books—No Ifs, Ands, or Butts: The Smoker's Guide to Quitting (1993) and The Expert Guide to Beating Heart Disease (2005). Krumholz is a strong proponent of preprint servers in medicine and is a co-founder of medRxiv, a preprint server for clinical research launched in 2019 in collaboration with Joseph Ross, Cold Spring Harbor Laboratories, and The BMJ.

Professional Activities and Awards

Krumholz was the recipient of the American Heart Association's Distinguished Scientist Award (2010), Distinguished Achievement Award (2011), and Clinical Research Prize (2019). He was elected to the National Academy of Medicine in 2007. He was also a member of the Advisory Committee to the Director of the National Institutes of Health. Krumholz was a 2014 recipient of the Friendship Award, China's highest award given to foreign experts who have made outstanding contributions to the country's economic and social progress.
