= Harry R. Jackson Jr. =

American protestant bishop (1953–2020)

Harry R. Jackson Jr. (February 4, 1953 – November 9, 2020) was an American Christian pastor, Pentecostal bishop, and author who served as the senior pastor at Hope Christian Church in Beltsville, Maryland, and served as the presiding bishop of the International Communion of Evangelical Churches. He was also a social conservative activist and commentator and was known for his opposition to same-sex marriage and abortion. Jackson was the founder and chairman of the High Impact Leadership Coalition, an organization of ministers who promote socially conservative causes, and was a co-founder of The Reconciled Church Initiative. Jackson died in November 2020 of unknown causes.

== Early life ==
Jackson was born and raised in Cincinnati, Ohio. He was the son of Harry Jackson Sr. and Essie Jackson. His family moved to Ohio from Florida three years before Jackson was born because a white policeman in Florida had nearly killed Jackson's father. Jackson became involved in political activism as a child with his mother. He attended Cincinnati Country Day School. In an interview, Jackson stated that he had been "the black kid at Country Day who stayed in the houses of wealthy white people". Jackson graduated from Williams College in Williamstown, Massachusetts, where he played football and wrestled at heavyweight. He received a tryout with the New England Patriots, but did not make the team.

Jackson's family moved to the Washington, D.C. area in 1973, eventually settling in Silver Spring, Maryland. Jackson obtained a high-level executive job at Republic Steel. He graduated from Harvard University with a master's degree in business administration.

== Ministry ==
The death of his father caused Jackson to decide to become a Christian minister. He moved to Cleveland, Ohio, where he preached in the inner city. Soon he took a job at Corning Glass (now Corning Incorporated) in Corning, New York, and preached in his free time. There, he founded a church called the Christian Hope Center, and his parishioners were mostly white. "We really broke racial barriers for a black man pastoring white people in 1981," he says.

Jackson's work in Corning attracted attention. He was recruited to Beltsville, Maryland to become the pastor of Hope Christian Church, a "multiethnic megachurch" that later grew to 3,500 people. He ministered there for the rest of his life.

== Views, activism, and political involvement ==
Jackson believed that same-sex marriage and abortion are morally wrong. He believed that abortion and gay marriage are causing the erosion of the black family, saying "I don't know of anybody black who says, 'I hate gay people.' We're more accepting generally. But you overlap that – homosexuality and gay marriage – with broken families, and we don't know how to put it back together," he said. "I believe that the Bible teaches that same-sex marriage is an oxymoron," he said. "If you redefine marriage, you have to redefine family. You'd have to redefine parenting. I'm looking at the extinction of marriage. And black culture is in a free fall."

Jackson was a prominent activist against same-sex marriage and abortion. Jackson began writing about the black family in the late 1990s, and he gained national recognition through his columns for Charisma magazine, in which he frequently wrote about abortion and gay marriage. In 2006, Jackson said, "'There are a whole lot of black Christians who may not be Republicans but who share similar moral values. So I appeal to the fact that more than two million black babies have been lost to abortion over the last four years and that over 70 percent of black babies are born to unwed mothers'".

In 2009, Jackson began leading the movement against legalizing same-sex marriage in Washington, D.C. A group led by Jackson filed a lawsuit in the District of Columbia after the D.C. Board of Elections refused to allow a ballot initiative on the issue of same-sex marriage, claiming that such an initiative would violate D.C.'s Human Rights Act. In January 2010, the D.C. Superior Court upheld the board's decision. Jackson appealed to the D.C. Court of Appeals, but the court upheld the Superior Court's decision in a 5–4 vote. Jackson then appealed to the United States Supreme Court, but the appeal was rejected without comment in January 2011.

Jackson was the founder and chairman of the High Impact Leadership Coalition, an organization composed of ministers who actively promote socially conservative causes. Jackson was also a co-founder of The Reconciled Church Initiative, which seeks to bring racial healing to the church and America.

Jackson concurred with Pope Benedict XVI's belief that condom distribution increases the incidence of AIDS. In 2009, Jackson wrote: "I agree with the Pope that a responsible and moral attitude toward sex would help fight the disease."

Jackson argued that some police departments ought to be defunded and encouraged conservatives not to minimize the deaths of black men in the custody of law enforcement.

According to Christianity Today, "Jackson achieved his greatest influence in Donald Trump’s White House, frequently attending functions, praying publicly, and advocating for policies such as the First Step Act, a prison reform bill that was signed into law in 2018. 'You can’t be a prophet to the culture while you’re standing outside of the room'. Jackson said in response to critics." Jackson prayed at Trump's inauguration on January 20, 2017 and visited the White House on multiple occasions during the Trump administration.

== Books ==
Jackson authored The Warrior’s Heart: Rules of Engagement for the Spiritual War Zone (2004) and You Were Born for More: Six Steps to Breaking Through to Your Destiny (2013). He also co-authored books with Family Research Council President Tony Perkins and pollster George Barna.

== Personal life and death ==
Jackson married his first wife, Vivian Michele Alexander, in 1976. Vivian served as a co-pastor of Hope Christian Church; she died in 2018. In September 2020, Jackson married Rosalind Lott.

In 2005, Jackson suffered esophageal cancer and a stroke. He later stated that he had nearly died in 2005.

Jackson died on November 9, 2020. He had recently attended a Rose Garden event, where the president nominated later-Justice Amy Coney Barrett to the U.S. Supreme Court, that was called a superspreader event by the New York Times and led to an outbreak at the White House. No cause of death was given.
