= Charles Ray (admiral) =

31st Vice Commandant of the Coast Guard

Charles W. Ray
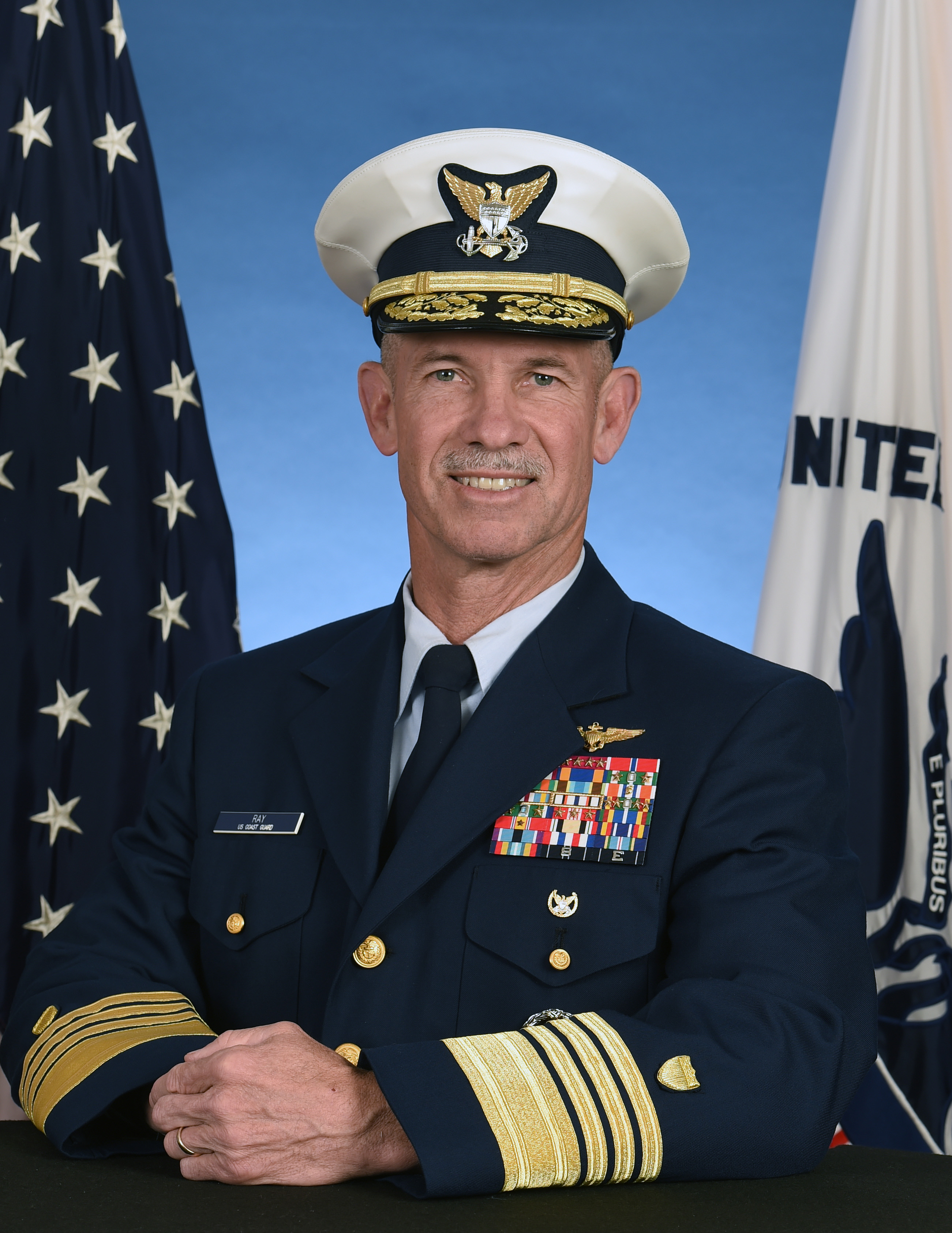
- Military career
- Allegiance: United States
- Branch: United States Coast Guard
- Service years: 1981–2021
- Rank: Admiral
- Commands: Pacific Area Commander; Fourteenth Coast Guard District; Coast Guard Air Station Borinquen
- Conflicts: Iraq War
- Awards: Homeland Security Distinguished Service Medal; Coast Guard Distinguished Service Medal (2); Legion of Merit (5); Bronze Star Medal; Meritorious Service Medal (2); Air Medal; Coast Guard Commendation Medal (3); Coast Guard Achievement Medal

Charles W. Ray is a retired United States Coast Guard admiral who served as the vice commandant of the Coast Guard from May 24, 2018 to June 18, 2021. He previously served as the Coast Guard's deputy commandant for operations.

== Early life and education ==
Ray is from Newport, Arkansas, and is a 1981 graduate of the United States Coast Guard Academy. After an assignment as a deck watch officer aboard USCGC Acushnet (WMEC-167), he was selected for Naval Flight Training and earned his wings in 1984.

== Coast Guard career ==
Ray has served at six Coast Guard Air Stations from Alaska to the Caribbean. He was designated an Aeronautical Engineer in 1988 and has served as Engineering Officer at three stations and at the Aviation Logistics Center as the Program Manager for the development of the Coast Guard's Aviation Logistics Management System. He commanded Coast Guard Air Station Borinquen, Puerto Rico from 2002 through 2005. During the course of his career he accumulated over 5,000 hours of helicopter flight time.

Ray's staff assignments include a tour as Chief of the Office of Performance Management at Coast Guard Headquarters followed by a tour as the Chief of Staff of the Fourteenth Coast Guard District. Ray earned a Master of Science degree in Industrial Administration from Purdue University and a Master of Science degree in National Resource Strategy from the Industrial College of the Armed Forces in Washington, D.C.

On October 5, 2020, Ray tested positive for COVID-19. Other military leaders were quarantined as a result.

Ray held the title of Ancient Albatross from April 6, 2015 to April 22, 2021. This made him the longest serving Coast Guard Aviator and the 25th Coast Guard aviator to hold the title. He relinquished the title to Rear Admiral Melvin Bouboulis on April 22, 2021.

== Flag assignments ==
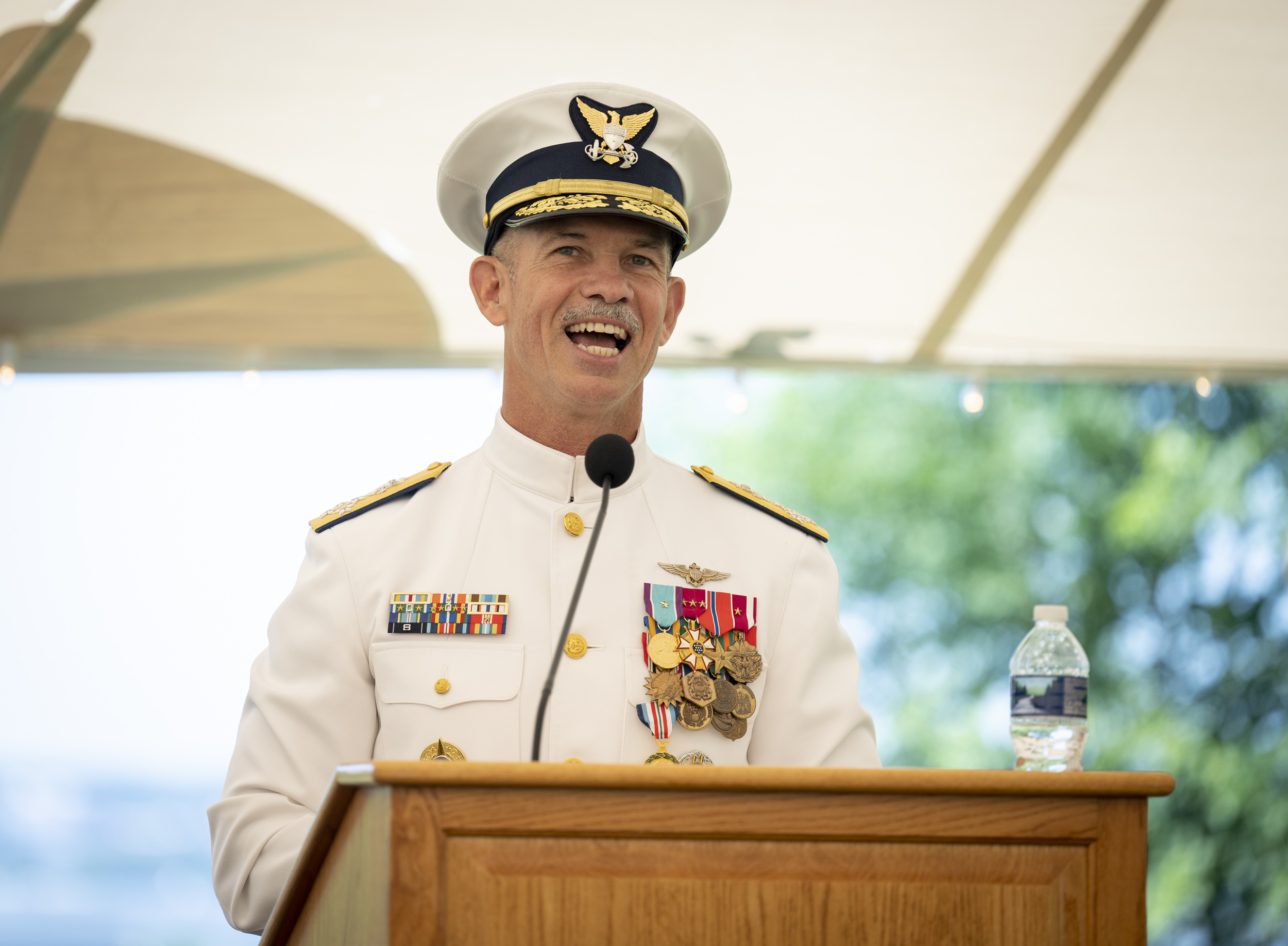
Ray speaks at his retirement ceremony in Washington D.C. in June 2021.

On May 24, 2018, Ray assumed the duties of the vice commandant, the second-in-command of the United States Coast Guard. Ray previously served the Coast Guard Deputy Commandant for Operations from August 2016 to May 2018. In this capacity, he was responsible for the development of operational strategy, policy, guidance, and resources that address national priorities. This oversight of Coast Guard missions, programs, and services includes: intelligence; international affairs; cyber; the maritime transportation system; commercial regulations and inspections; search and rescue; maritime security; law enforcement; defense operations; environmental response; contingency planning; and the operational capabilities of cutter, boat, aviation, shore, and deployable specialized forces.

During his tenure, he failed to act on plans to share the findings with Congress, the Department of Homeland Security, and the public an investigation into rape and sexual assault in the Coast Guard Academy. After inquiries from CNN, Coast Guard officials briefed members of Congress in June 2023. On August 18, 2023, Admiral Ray stepped down as Tyler Chair in Leadership at the Loy Institute at the Coast Guard Academy "for the good of the Service and the good of the Academy."

Ray's previous Flag Assignment was as the Pacific Area Commander. Prior to that he held flag assignments as the Deputy Pacific Area Commander, the Fourteenth Coast Guard District Commander, service with U.S. Forces Iraq as Director of the Iraq Training and Advisory Mission for the Ministry of the Interior, and as the military advisor to the Secretary of the Department of Homeland Security.

== Awards and decorations ==

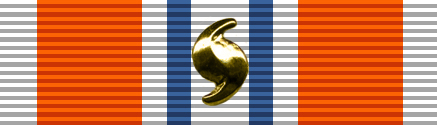

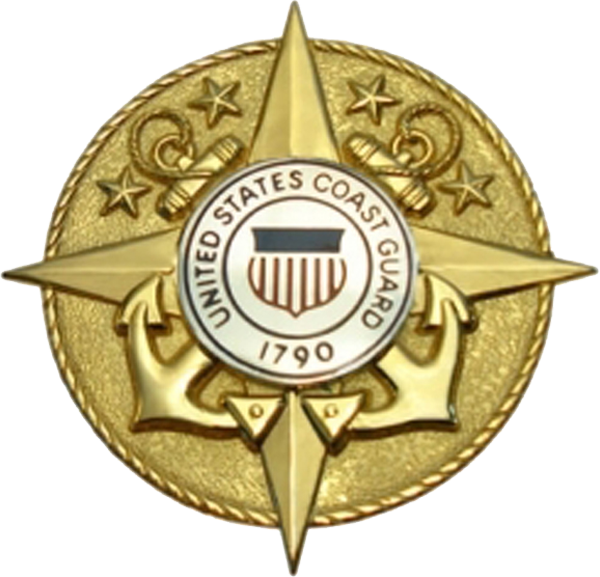

Badge	Naval Aviator insignia		
1st row	Homeland Security Distinguished Service Medal		
2nd row	Coast Guard Distinguished Service Medal with one gold award star	Legion of Merit with four award stars	Bronze Star
3rd row	Meritorious Service Medal with award star	Air Medal	Coast Guard Commendation Medal with "O" device and two award stars
4th row	Coast Guard Achievement Medal	Commandant's Letter of Commendation Ribbon	Coast Guard Presidential Unit Citation with "hurricane symbol"
5th row	Joint Meritorious Unit Award	Secretary of Transportation Outstanding Unit Award	Coast Guard Unit Commendation with "O" device and four award stars
6th row	Coast Guard Meritorious Unit Commendation with "O" device and two award stars	Meritorious Team Commendation with three award stars	Coast Guard Bicentennial Unit Commendation
7th row	National Defense Service Medal with one service star	Iraq Campaign Medal	Global War on Terrorism Service Medal
8th row	Humanitarian Service Medal	Transportation 9-11 Ribbon	Special Operations Service Ribbon
9th row	Sea Service Ribbon	Rifle Marksmanship Ribbon with silver sharpshooter device	Expert Pistol Marksmanship Medal
Badge	Commandant Staff Badge		
Badge	Joint Staff Identification Badge		

== Sources ==
- "Admiral Charles W. Ray". Coast Guard. U.S. Coast Guard.

Military offices
Preceded by Charles D. Michel	Vice Commandant of the Coast Guard; 2018–2021	Succeeded by Linda L. Fagan
