= Esther Choo =

Emergency physician and professor

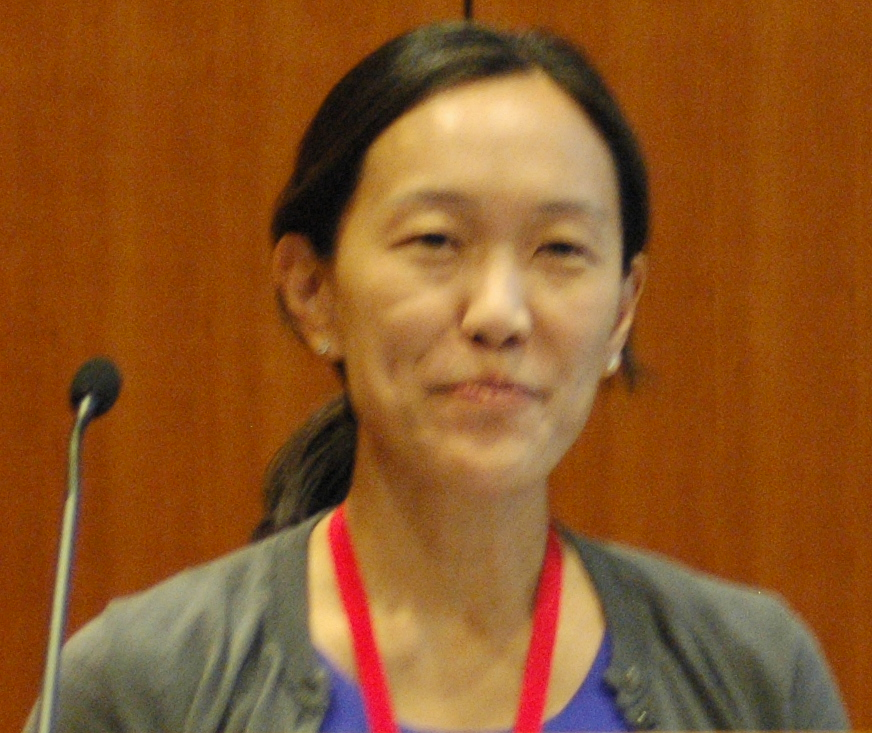
- Choo at the World Congress on Internet in Health and Medicine in 2012
- Education: Yale University (MD, 2001); Oregon Health & Science University (MPH, 2009)
- Scientific career
- Workplaces: Oregon Health & Science University (2016-); Alpert Medical School

Esther Choo is an emergency physician and professor at the Oregon Health & Science University. She is a popular science communicator who has used social media to talk about racism and sexism in healthcare. She was the president of the Academy of Women in Academic Emergency Medicine and is a member of the American Association of Women Emergency Physicians. She was a co-founder and a board member of Time's Up. On February 26, 2021, Choo was named in a lawsuit against OHSU alleging that Choo failed to take action when she was made aware of an alleged sexual assault involving Dr. Jason Campbell, who became popular on TikTok during the COVID-19 pandemic.

== Early life ==
Choo grew up in Cleveland, Ohio. Her parents emigrated from Korea in the 1960s. She graduated in 1994 with a degree in English from Yale College. She was an intern at The Plain Dealer, a newspaper in Cleveland. She earned a medical degree at Yale University in 2001. She was a resident at Boston Medical Center. In 2009, she returned for further training, earning a Master's in Public Health at Oregon Health & Science University.

== Career ==
Choo completed her emergency medicine residency at Boston Medical Center, did a health services research fellowship at Oregon Health & Science University, and later became an associate professor at the Alpert Medical School. She won the 2012 Outstanding Physician Award from the University Emergency Medicine Foundation, the SAEM Young Investigator Award, and the OHSU Emerging Leader Award Since 2016, she has been an associate professor at Oregon Health & Science University Hospital. Her research interests include developing effective interventions for women who experience partner violence and substance misuse. In 2018, she was the co-founder of Equity Quotient, a start-up which monitors and addresses equity culture in healthcare organizations.

=== Advocacy ===
She is an advocate for more multiculturalism, gender parity and diversity in medicine, often praising women's doctors. She has written for the blog FemInEM, a resource for women in emergency medicine. Choo was President of the Academy for Women in Academic Emergency Medicine. She was a leader of the Division of Women's Health in Emergency Care at Alpert Medical School, and is President of the non-profit Gender Equity Research Group.

She started a conversation about racism in medicine on Twitter after the August 12 white supremacist rally in Charlottesville, Virginia.

@choo_ek: 1/ We've got a lot of white nationalists in Oregon. So a few times a year, a patient in the ER refuses treatment from me because of my race.

The tweet was shared by 25,000 people, including Chelsea Clinton.

=== Controversies ===
On June 21, 2019, Choo tweeted "White people can be exhausting. Just an observation." Choo's employer, OHSU, noted that the comment was posted on a personal account, and "does not purport to represent the views of OHSU, this communication does not violate any OHSU policy or prohibition."

On February 26, 2021, Choo was named in a lawsuit against OHSU alleging that Choo failed to take action when she was made aware of an alleged sexual assault involving Dr. Jason Campbell, who became popular on TikTok during the COVID-19 pandemic. Two months after Choo had been informed of the sexual assaults she went on to promote Dr. Campbell on social media. When the woman who had been assaulted confronted Choo about her open support of Dr. Campbell, Choo responded "I don't need policing by White women". On March 4, Times Up released a statement supporting Choo. Following this statement at least 4 founding members of Times Up Healthcare resigned in protest and 10 founders were removed from the Times Up Healthcare website.
