= Elizabeth Fowler (lawyer) =

American lawyer

- Education: University of Pennsylvania; Johns Hopkins Bloomberg School of Public Health; University of Minnesota
- Employer(s): National Economic Council; United States Senate; Hogan Lovells; Center for Medicare and Medicaid Innovation
- Scientific career
- Thesis: Predictive performance of current risk adjustment systems : application to pediatric populations (1996)

Elizabeth Fowler is an American lawyer who was Director of the Center for Medicare and Medicaid Innovation in the Biden Administration. She previously served under President Barack Obama at the National Economic Council. In 2022, she was included by Stat News on their list of leaders in the life sciences and she was elected a Member of the National Academy of Medicine.

== Early life and education ==
Fowler was an undergraduate student in health care management at the University of Pennsylvania. She moved to the Johns Hopkins Bloomberg School of Public Health. Her research considered risk adjustment. After earning her Ph.D. there, she enrolled at the University of Minnesota Law School. She was admitted to the bar in Maryland.

== Career ==
After earning her Juris Doctor degree, Fowler joined the Park Nicollet Foundation in Minnesota. There, she spent almost five years researching health services. She worked as an attorney at Hogan Lovells, a law firm based in Washington, D.C.

Fowler worked at Vice President for Public Policy at Anthem (then WellPoint). During the health reform debate, Fowler served as Chief Health Counsel to Max Baucus and worked on health reform for the United States Senate.

Fowler was appointed special assistant to President Barack Obama, working on economic policy at the National Economic Council. She was involved with the design and delivery of the Affordable Care Act. After leaving the Obama administration, Fowler joined Johnson & Johnson as vice president for Global Health.

In March 2021, Fowler was appointed by Joe Biden to serve as Director of the Center for Medicare and Medicaid Innovation at the Department of Health and Human Services. She is responsible for overseeing the development of innovative payment and service delivery models that aim to reduce spending while preserving or improving quality of care in the Medicare, Medicaid and CHIP programs. In 2022, she was included by Stat News on its list of leaders in the life sciences.
