= Robert L. Murphy =

American physician (born 1950)

Robert Leo Murphy (born 1950) is an American infectious disease physician and professor of medicine. He is the John Philip Phair Professor of Infectious Diseases at Northwestern University where he serves as executive director of the Institute for Global Health and the Center for Global Communicable Diseases. Murphy earned a MD at the Stritch School of Medicine in 1978. He completed a medical residency and fellowship at Northwestern Memorial Hospital.
