= United States Semiquincentennial =

250th anniversary of US independence

- Date: July 4, 2026; 4 months ago
- Location: United States
- Previous event: Bicentennial (1976)
- Major events: 250th anniversary of the Second Continental Congress adopting the Declaration of Independence
- President: Donald Trump
- Organizer: United States Semiquincentennial Commission, America250 (congressional, non-partisan organization established in 2016); White House Task Force on Celebrating America's 250th Birthday, Freedom 250 (White House organization established in 2025)
- Website: america250.org

The United States Semiquincentennial (Note: Refers to "half (semi) of five (quin) of a century", an alternative of which is Bicenquinquagenary which comes from two (bi), hundred (cen(t)) and fifty (quinquagen).) was the 250th anniversary of the United States Declaration of Independence. Festivities marked various events leading up to the 250th Independence Day, July 4, 2026.

Official planning for the celebrations began in 2016, with the establishment of the United States Semiquincentennial Commission, a congressional, non-partisan commission that operated under the branding America250. Commemorations were organized at the federal, state, and municipal level (including a particular focus on cities important to American history (including Boston, Philadelphia, New York City, and Charleston), while America250 promoted charitable and volunteering initiatives. Part of the 2026 FIFA World Cup was held across the United States, with matches in Philadelphia and Houston on the date of the semiquincentennial. Some of the celebrations were disrupted by a record-breaking heat wave and forecasts of stormy weather.

After being elected to a second presidency in 2024, Donald Trump exerted political influence over the semiquincentennial activities. Federal funding was diverted from America250 to the White House Task Force on Celebrating America's 250th Birthday, and its funding arm Freedom 250 LLC,; it organized events in Washington, D.C. such as the Christian evangelism event Rededicate 250, UFC Freedom 250 at the White House, the IndyCar Series' Freedom 250 Grand Prix, the Great American State Fair and Salute to America concert and fireworks display on the National Mall,. Federal officials also announced plans for commemorative currency and passports, some bearing the likeness or signature of Trump, as part of the commemorations.

Trump's commemorations were criticized as being politicized, lacking in financial transparency, and exacerbating the political and cultural divide between his supporters and opposition, including the diversion of federal funding to cover partisan activities and events intended to incentivize his donors (including collaborations with conservative groups on educational materials, which were criticized for containing distorted accounts of U.S. history) while self-promoting Trump's ideology and legacy, and for largely overshadowing and creating confusion with the non-partisan America250.

== Background ==
The Second Continental Congress, meeting in Philadelphia, voted for the independence of the United Colonies by passing the Lee Resolution on July 2, 1776. The Declaration of Independence, mainly written by Committee of Five member Thomas Jefferson, was proclaimed on July 4, the date on which the anniversary of independence is observed.

There were no major government-sponsored 50th anniversary observances on July 4, 1826, a day on which John Adams and Thomas Jefferson, two pivotal Founding Fathers, both died. In 1876, the United States organized nationwide centennial observances centered on the Centennial Exposition in Philadelphia, in 1926, a Sesquicentennial Exposition was held in Philadelphia, and in 1976, United States Bicentennial observances were held throughout the country.

== Organization ==
Flag of United States Semiquincentennial

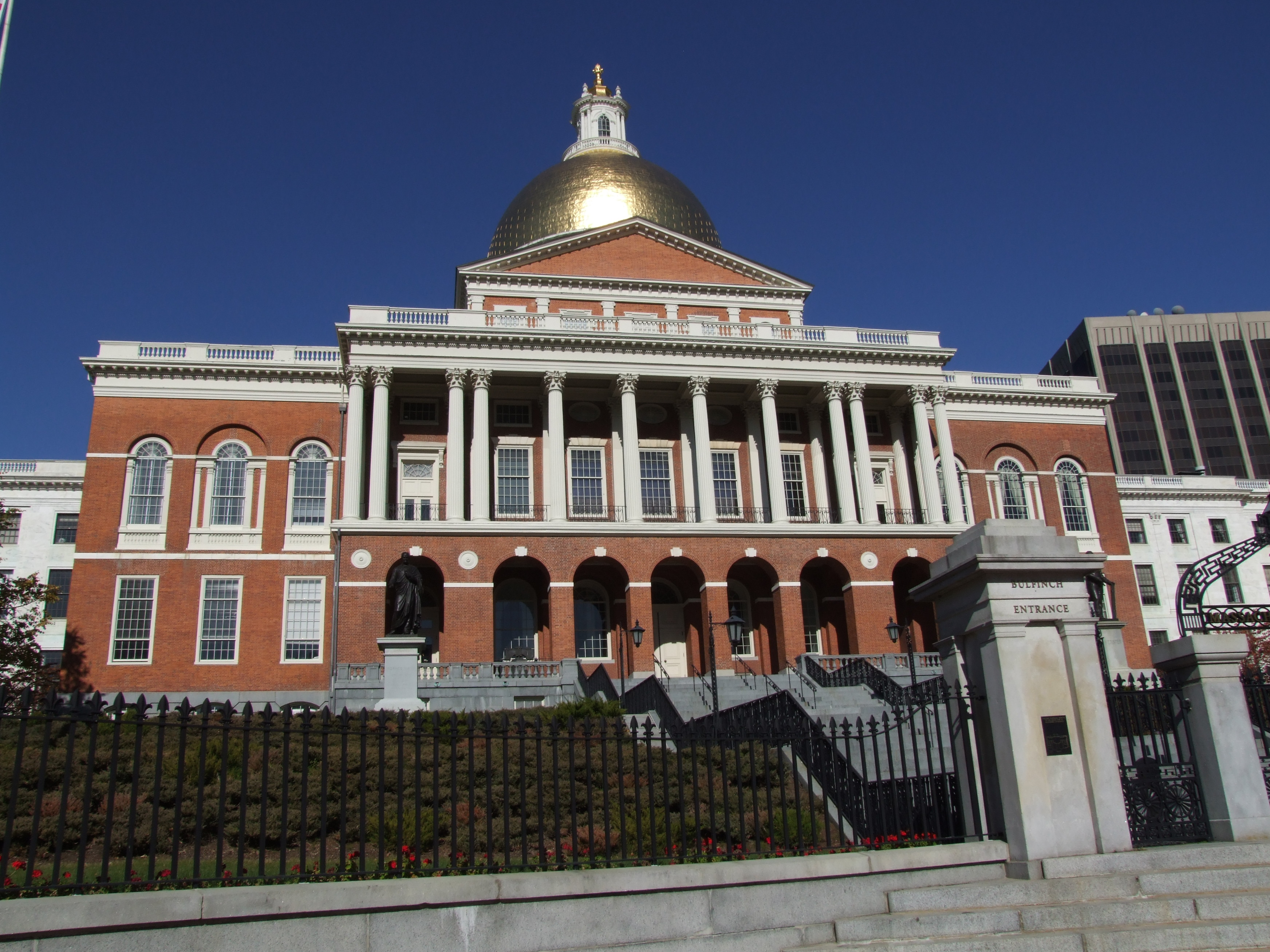
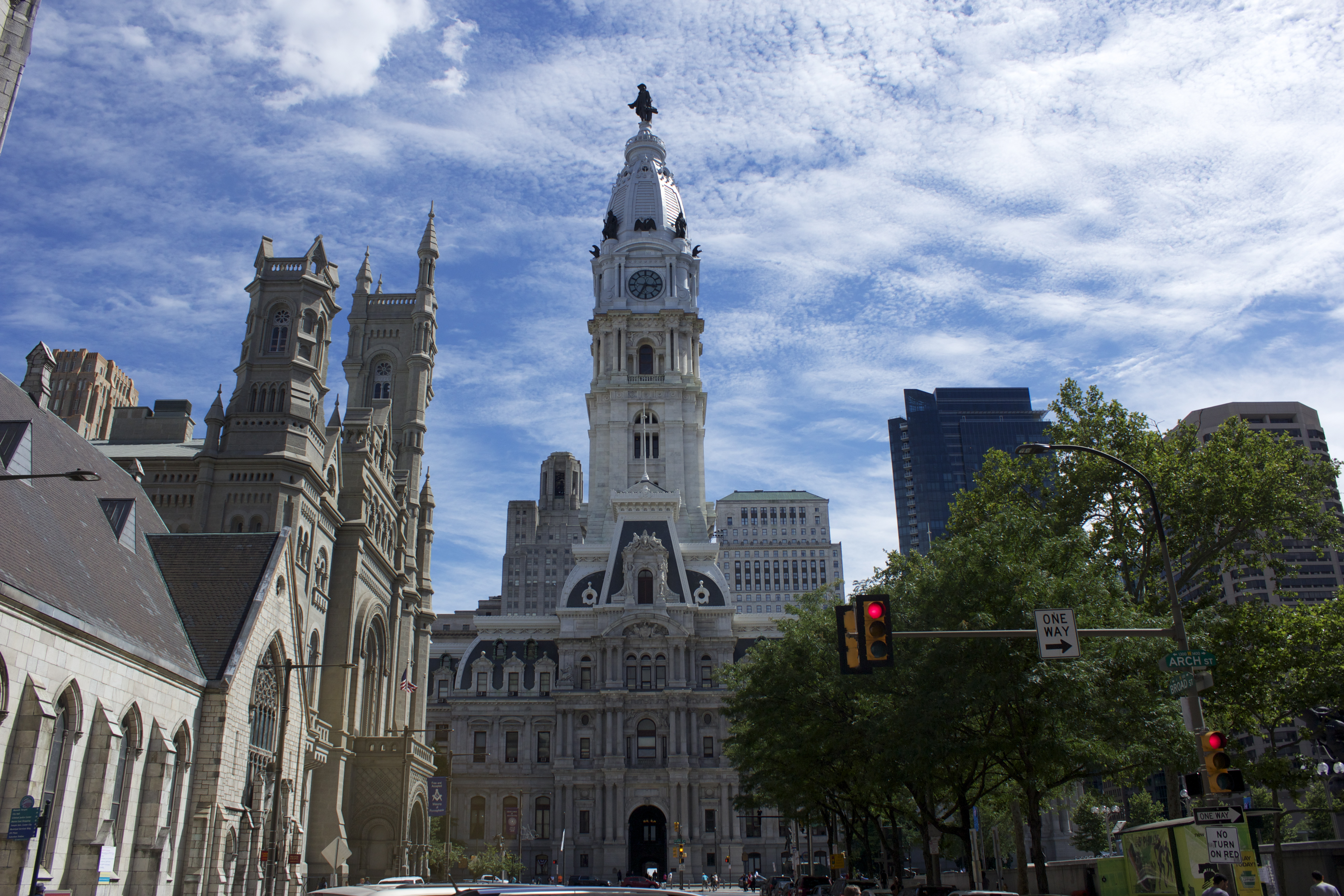
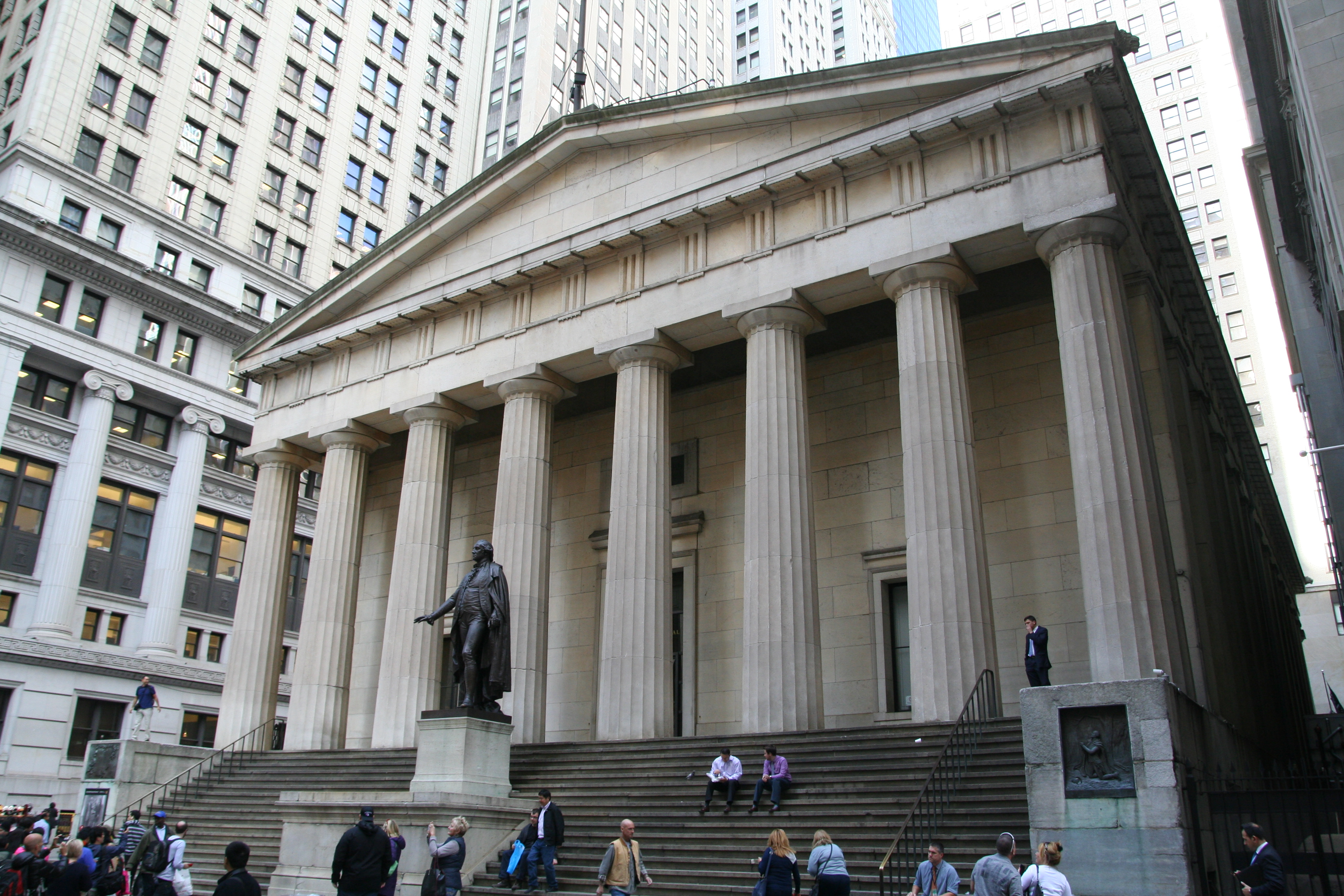
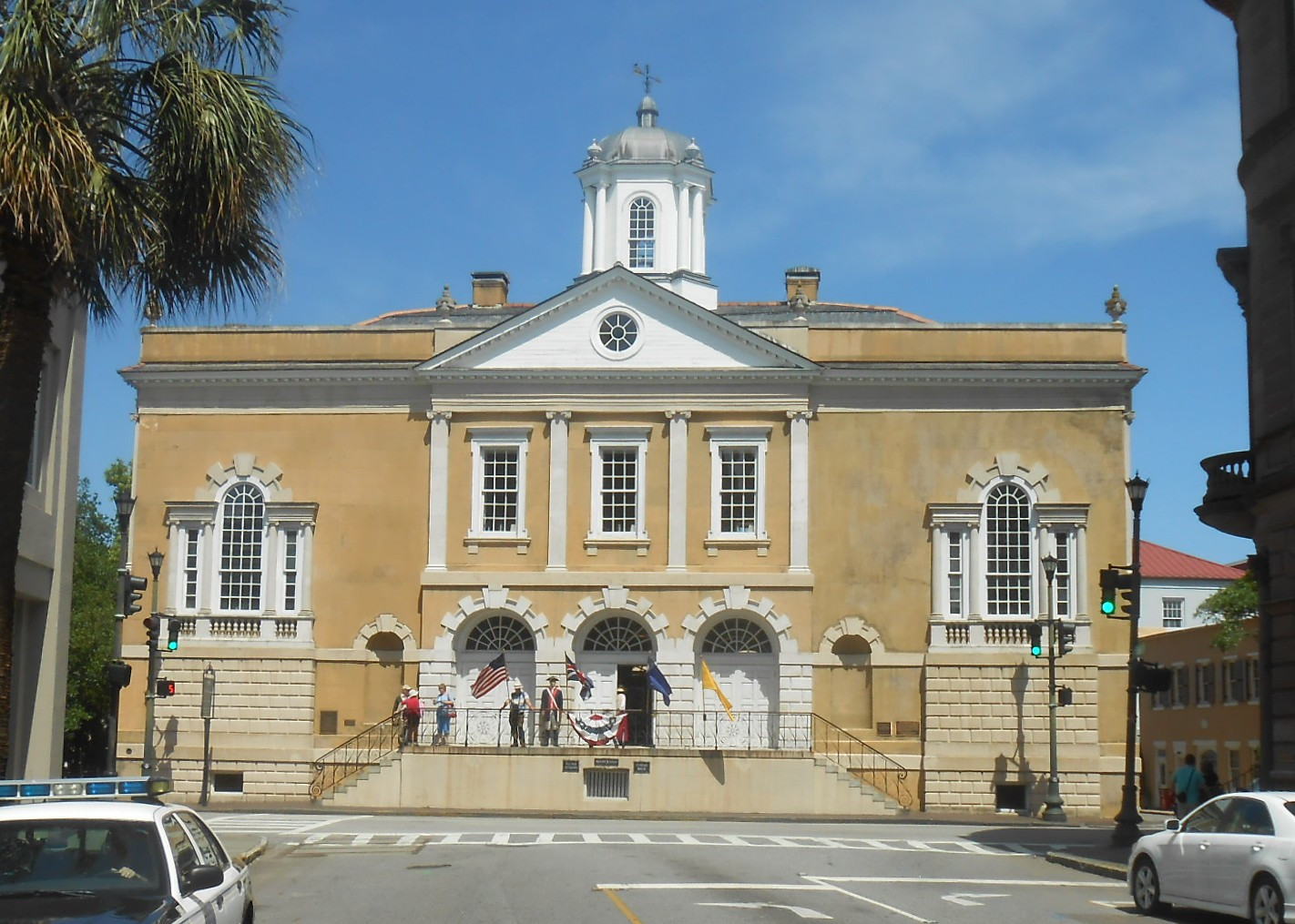
Federal legislation directs that semiquincentennial events receive special focus in the cities of Boston, Philadelphia, Charleston, and New York (pictured, clockwise from top left).

The United States Semiquincentennial Commission Act of 2016 directed the United States government to issue commemorative coins and postage stamps, and commission appropriately named naval vessels, in advance of the semiquincentennial. In addition, specific activities—both officially organized and independently created—were planned. The legislation specifically directed the organization of events "in locations of historical significance to the United States" going on to list Boston, Philadelphia, New York City, and Charleston, South Carolina, as "leading cities".

The Circulating Collectible Coin Redesign Act of 2020 allowed the United States Mint to redesign any coins in 2026. It called for a series of five designs for the quarter, including one depicting women's contributions to independence. 2025 changes by the second Trump administration ignored recommendations by the Citizens Coinage Advisory Committee and removed coins celebrating abolition, women's suffrage and the civil rights movement as part of a campaign against "wokeness".

America's Potluck was a nationwide communal meal event on July 5, 2026, the day after the semiquincentennial. Organized by the America250 Utah Commission and adopted across all 50 states and Puerto Rico, the initiative invited neighbors, families and community groups to host or attend potluck meals to celebrate the anniversary.

Plans for the casting of a new public bell are being coordinated by the National Bell Festival. The bell will honor 250 years of women's contributions to U.S. history, and will lead nationwide ringing tributes during the celebrations.

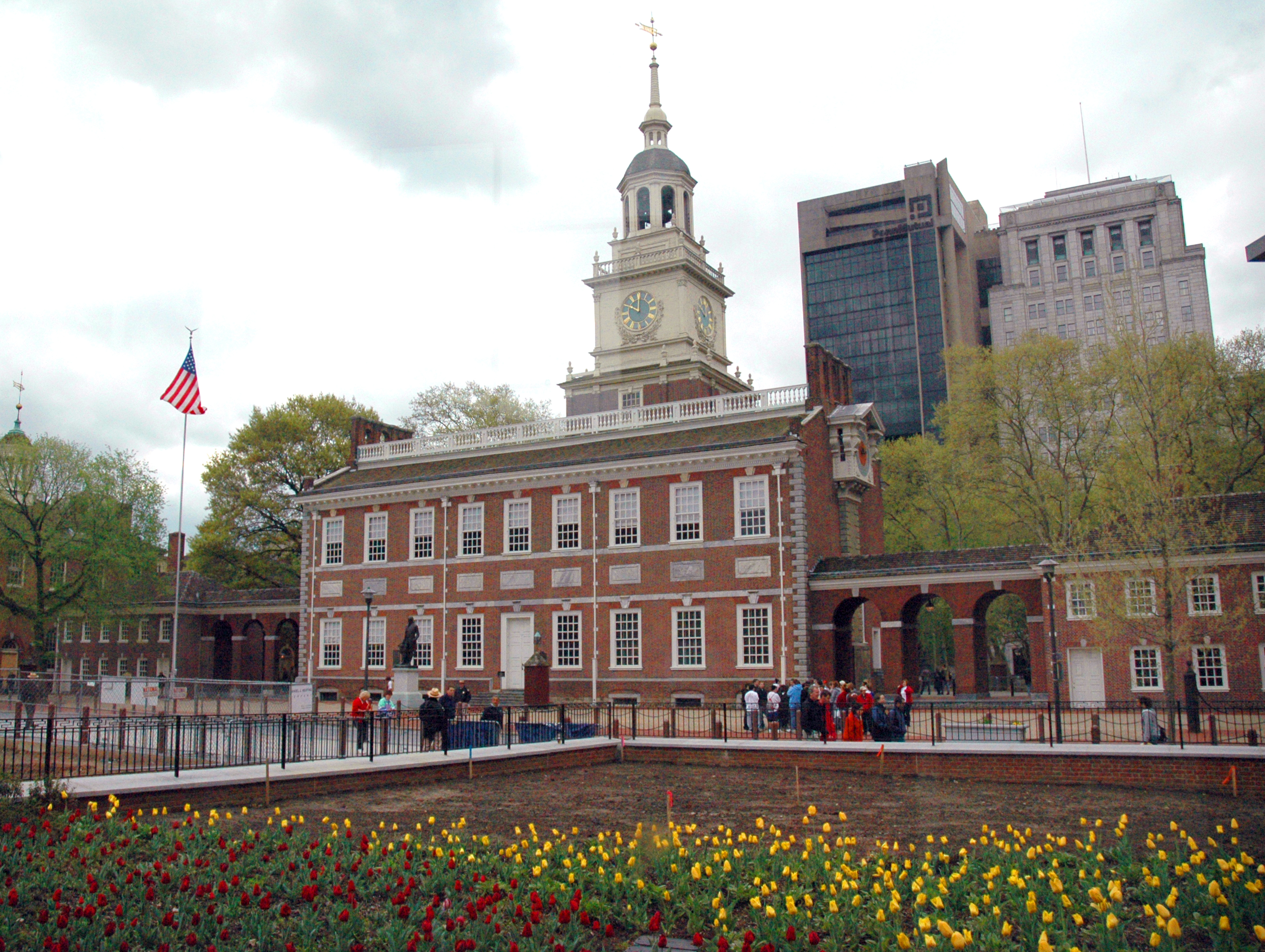
The Declaration of Independence was signed in Independence Hall in Philadelphia in 1776.

Celebrations were organized by two main organizations at the federal level: the non-partisan congressional America250 Commission created in 2016 and backed by a nonprofit; and the White House Task Force on Celebrating America's 250th Birthday, chaired by Donald Trump and established via an executive order in 2025.

== Planning ==
=== America250 ===
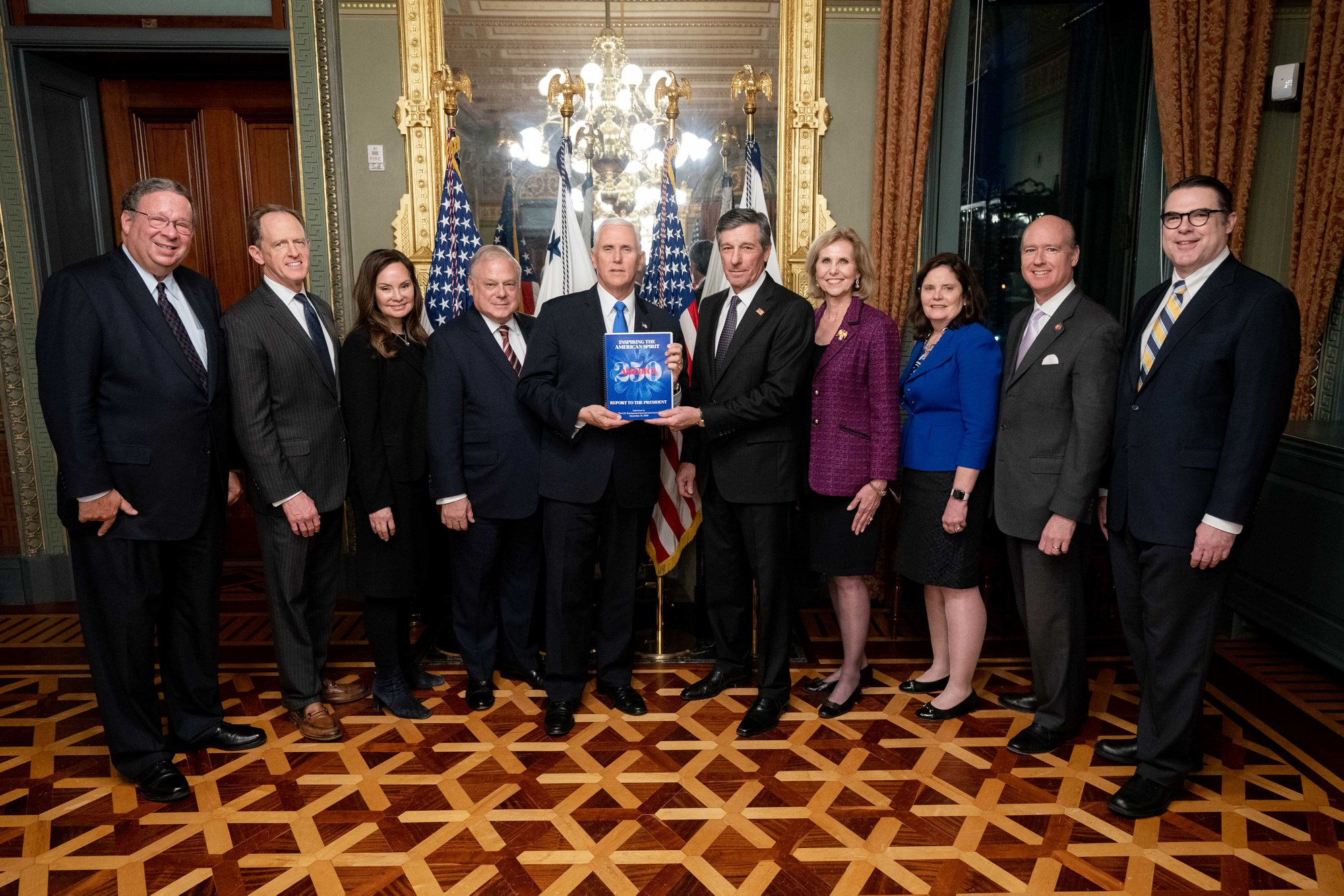
Members of the United States Semiquincentennial Commission present vice president Mike Pence with a copy of a Congressionally-required report on January 15, 2020, at the Vice President's Ceremonial Office in the Eisenhower Executive Office Building. From left to right: David L. Cohen, Senator Pat Toomey, Rosa Gumataotao Rios, Frank Giordano, executive director of the commission, Vice President Mike Pence, Chairman Daniel DiLella, Lynn Forney Young, Cathy Gillespie, Congressman Robert Aderholt, and James L. Swanson.

In 2011, the non-profit organization USA250 was established in Philadelphia to lobby for federal government support of the United States semiquincentennial and establish Philadelphia as the host city for events surrounding the semiquincentennial observances. In 2014, the Philadelphia City Council ordered a public hearing of the Committee on Parks, Recreation, and Cultural Affairs to investigate "the impact and feasibility of Philadelphia" hosting the United States Semiquincentennial in 2026, among other events. The United States Semiquincentennial Commission was subsequently established in July 2016, and signed by president of the United States, Barack Obama. The act was amended in December 2020, to allow the commission to accept congressional funding, to add a justice of the Supreme Court to the commission, and to make additional technical changes.

On November 15, 2017, the United States Department of the Interior issued a request for proposals seeking a non-profit corporation to act as secretariat to the commission and lead a nationwide organization of observances. The American Battlefield Trust was named the commission's non-profit partner to serve as Administrative Secretariat, tasked with preparing reports for Congress and helping raise funds for the anniversary observances. The trust "has distinguished itself in fundraising and managing high-profile commemorative events, and that expertise will be invaluable to the U.S.A. 250th Commemoration planning efforts," said then-secretary of the interior Ryan Zinke.

Daniel DiLella, CEO and President of Equus, a leading private equity real estate fund, was appointed Chairperson of the Semiquincentennial Commission in April 2018, leading a 32-member body composed of members of Congress, private citizens, and federal officials. The commission was tasked with developing a report containing recommendations for the president and Congress within the first two years of its formation. The commission will observe and commemorate not only the Revolution, but also the full history of the U.S. leading up to the 250th Anniversary.

On November 16, 2018, the 33 members of the United States Semiquincentennial were sworn in at Independence Hall in Philadelphia and convened their first organizing meeting to begin eight years of planning and organizing for the 250th national birthday celebration. Dilella estimated that the group would meet three or four times a year. The new commission consisted of 16 private citizens, including chairman DiLella; eight members of Congress and nine federal officials. The day before the meeting, the Daughters of the American Revolution, in partnership with the commission, held a tree-planting ceremony to introduce its Pathway of the Patriots along the Schuylkill River Trail. Project organizers expect to plant 250 new trees along the trail from the city to Valley Forge. After being named the non-profit partner in October 2018, the American Battlefield Trust provided financial and staff support to get the commission operational as well as initial legal support.

In July 2021, the America250 Foundation made public its website as well as its marketing campaign, which initially consisted of advertisements in more than 4,559 locations in the four "leading cities," as well as a public service announcement aired on Comcast NBCUniversal networks that summer. Advertisements were displayed "[from] Times Square and the Lincoln Tunnel in New York to the Walt Whitman Bridge in Philadelphia," with original content also being published on the campaign's social media accounts.

External videos
- Memorandum of Understanding for Cooperation in Support for Cooperation in Support of the 250th Anniversary of the United States of America
- America 250 Interagency Memorandum of Understanding Signing Ceremony on YouTube (August 20, 2021)

In July 2022, President Joe Biden designated former treasurer of the United States Rosie Rios as chair of the U.S. Semiquincentennial Commission. Rios, who replaced Dan DiLella, was first appointed to the commission on January 11, 2018. DiLella will continue to serve as a commissioner. On October 3, 2022, Rios announced that CEO Joe Daniels had resigned. Daniels, who came from the 9/11 Memorial Museum in New York City, had served as America 250 CEO for one year.

On August 1, 2024, the Semiquincentennial Commission announced that former presidents George W. Bush and Barack Obama, as well as their spouses, former first ladies Laura Bush and Michelle Obama, will serve as the commission's honorary national co-chairs.

By 2025, Trump was criticized for taking more control over the non-partisan congressional America250 organization. He installed Fox News producer Ariel Abergel and Trump campaign officials as leaders, dropped contractors with ties to Democrats, partnered with conservative organization PragerU to provide educational materials for festivities, and had America250 partner with a cryptocurrency event featuring his two sons. The committee also partnered with conservative organization Moms for Liberty, and allowed its "America250" branding to be used at Trump rallies. Giant banners with Trump's face and "America250" branding were hung alongside Theodore Roosevelt at the Department of Labor headquarters in Washington, D.C. A letter to Rios and Abergel by all of the Democratic lawmakers on the commission wrote that: "Unfortunately, recent America250 funded and branded events have been partisan and have not served America250's purpose and mission of uniting us as a nation." In September 2025, the commission fired Abergel, with sources telling The Wall Street Journal that he had attempted to steer the direction of programming towards honoring Trump.

By the end of 2025, $10 million worth of funding towards America250 was diverted to Freedom 250's "Freedom Trucks". In early 2026, Representative Bonnie Watson Coleman stated that America250 had only received $25 million of its congressionally appropriated $150 million, and was concerned the remainder would be reallocated to the Trump-aligned Freedom 250. The 250 Commission stated that it had enough money to continue with its original programming, which include "America's Field Trip" asking students across the country what America means to them, and the national volunteering effort "America Gives".

=== White House Task Force 250 / Freedom 250 ===
During his 2024 presidential campaign, Donald Trump pledged to throw a "spectacular birthday party" to honor the anniversary, by assembling a White House task force named "White House Task Force on Celebrating America's 250th Birthday". The Task Force is separate from the bipartisan United States Semiquincentennial Commission with the White House-led "Task Force 250" chaired by Trump and his political appointees, and is described as more overtly political. Its funding arm, "Freedom 250", assisted Task Force 250's execution of Trump's proposals. In 2025, internal documents from the Interior Department instructed its staff to make Freedom 250 the "primary branding" for all national birthday events.

The New York Times described events held by Trump's Freedom 250 as having "lacked connection to American history", and were described as "tailored to Mr. Trump's political agenda and his penchant for spectacle, personal branding and legacy". The Associated Press described it as focused on "splashy events" compared to America250's focus on civic engagement and history. Initial proposals included a "Great American State Fair" to be held in the Iowa State Fairgrounds, featuring pavilions from all fifty states, "Patriot Games" for high-school athletes, public monuments such as a National Garden of American Heroes, and other year-long celebrations and projects across the country. On January 29, 2025, President Trump signed Executive Order 14189, entitled "Celebrating America's 250th Birthday". It also proposed a UFC fight on the White House lawn.

Freedom 250 offered access to Trump and other benefits to donors who gave $1 million to the organization. The Times described the organization as taking on a "Trumpian flare" and overshadowing years of planning work done by America250. While America250 is a stand-alone congressionally authorized nonprofit group, Freedom 250 "utilizes opaque corporate structures" and is "technically a limited liability company created by, and housed inside, the National Park Foundation". US embassies promoted Freedom 250 and America250 to overseas donors to host lavish parties and events, with former diplomats and business executives describing an "aggressive" fundraising push that raised tens of millions of dollars. Freedom 250 spokeswoman Danielle Alvarez stated that the Freedom 250 name had been embraced across the administration, and suggested that embassies were using the name as shorthand for their own semiquincentennial initiatives not directly related to the group and that it did not receive foreign funding.

Trump's formation of Task Force 250 was criticized by Democrats and some historians as an attempt to politicize the celebrations, with conservative author and political scientist John J. Pitney describing them as "an opportunity for people to curry Trump's favor" through donations. John Dichtl, president of the American Association for State and Local History criticized Task Force 250's decision to host a UFC fight on the White House lawn, writing "What does a (UFC) fight have to do with America's greatness?" A June 21 letter by Democrats on the bipartisan America250 commission questioned its relationship to the Trump-led Task Force 250 and its events.

In February 2026, Democratic senators launched a probe into Freedom 250's funding practices over its transparency and potential conflicts of interest. During a February congressional hearing, Democratic Representative Jared Huffman accused the Trump administration of using Freedom 250 to "hijack the country's 250th anniversary and sell access, hide his donors and rewrite history" and that Republicans had "let him clean house and put loyalists on the board of the National Park Foundation, open the door to foreign, dark money donors to buy influence with zero oversight". Representative Maxine Dexter expressed concerns that the organization was using public money and mixing it with private donations, and that the structure of the organization made it difficult to trace where the money came from. The Interior Department has stated that the U.S. Semiquincentennial Commission receives money through an interagency agreement with the National Park Service, but did not respond to questions regarding the distribution of federal money to America250. NOTUS reported that as of April 29, 2026, Freedom 250 had received $68.3 million from the Department of the Interior.

=== Local ===
In 2016, Revolution 250, a non-profit group organized to plan commemorative events in Boston surrounding the semiquincentennial, was established. According to the organization, it is a consortium of 56 groups, including the Society of the Cincinnati, the National Park Service, the Boston Tea Party Museum, the New England Historic Genealogical Society, the Suffolk University history department, the Boston Downtown Business Improvement District, The Bostonian Society, and others.

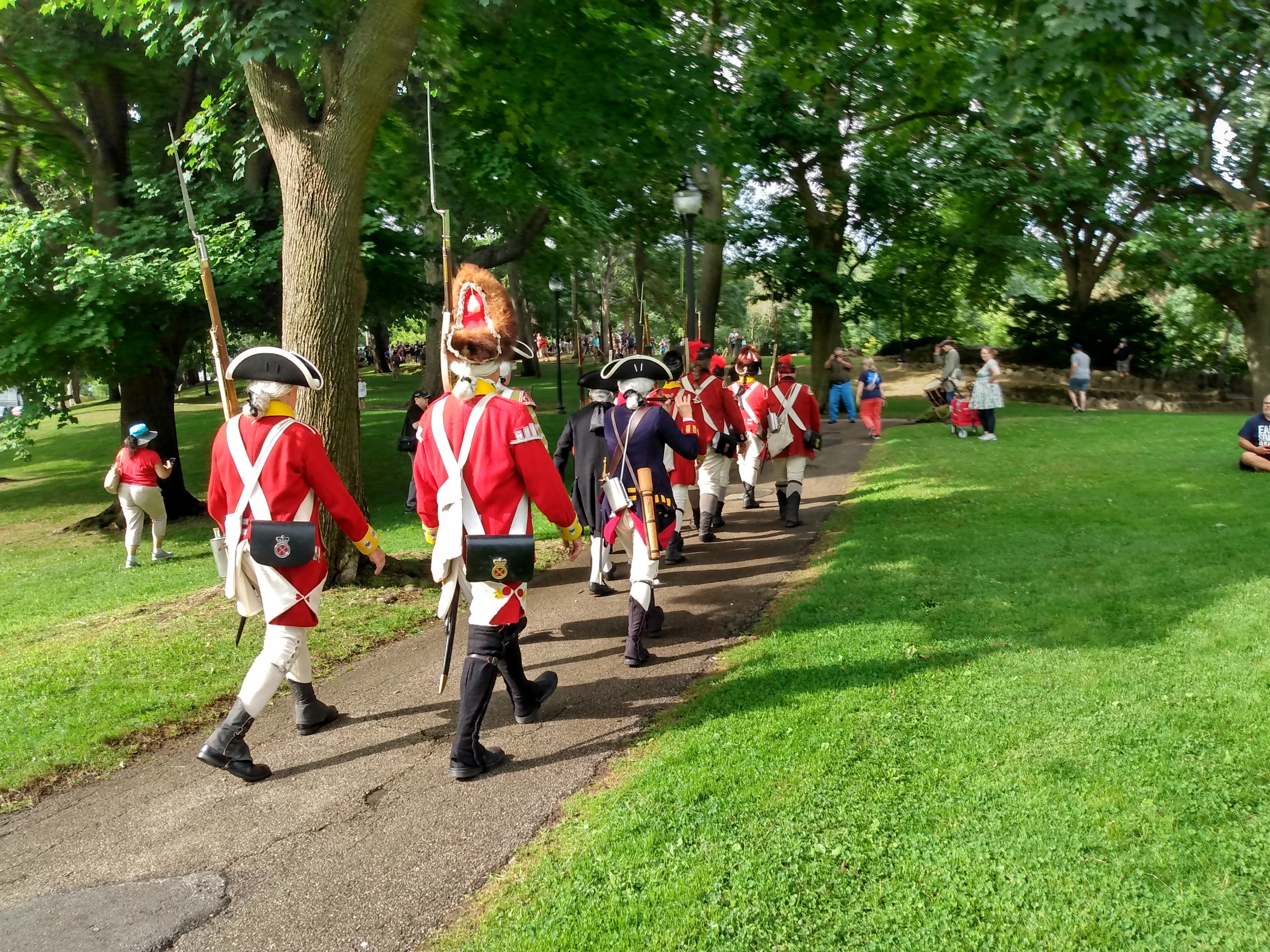
Re-enactors portraying the 4th Regiment of Foot marching to the Old Powder House for the 250th anniversary commemoration, September 2024.

The incident known as the Powder Alarm of 1774 in the city now known as Somerville was commemorated by a reenactment in 2024, on a Sunday 250 years after the Sunday of the actual event. The following day, activities in nearby Cambridge explored the consequences of this event.

For the 250th Evacuation Day celebrations, commemorating the evacuation of British forces from the city of Boston following the siege of Boston, early in the American Revolutionary War, on March 17, 2026, the NPS will carry out a $25 million overhaul of the Dorchester Heights Monument. The planned renovations, which will take approximately 18 months to complete, will include work on "taking apart and reassembling the top floors, placing granite slabs to mark where the 1776 fortifications sat, bringing the retaining walls, drainage and lighting up to date and giving the info panels a face lift."

In honor of George Washington's troops' final leg of the trip to secretly haul cannons from Fort Hill to the Fortification of Dorchester Heights, artist Michael Dowling sought 100,000 Bostonians, a seventh of the city population, to write "a short story of belonging" on any piece of cloth, which will then be tied in a 4-mile (6.4 km) long rope, the same length as the covert journey.

In 2017, the Daughters of the American Revolution announced a grant of $380,000 to the city of Philadelphia to plant 76 semiquincentennial commemorative trees at Independence National Historical Park. The actual planting of the trees occurred over the course of several years leading up to the semiquincentennial. In 2018, at the state level, the Pennsylvania Commission for the United States Semiquincentennial Commission (A250PA) was formed.

The commission prepared a time capsule for burial in Philadelphia on July 4, 2026, which is scheduled for unearthing on July 4, 2276, the 500th anniversary of the Declaration of Independence.

In 2016, Philadelphia city planners announced "Vision 2026", a plan to redevelop Old City in preparation for the semiquincentennial.

On October 15, 2025, President Trump proposed a Memorial Circle Arch to be built in Washington, D.C. as part of celebrations to welcome people as they approach the traffic circle on Columbia Island heading towards the Arlington Memorial Bridge and into the west end of the National Mall. The arch, named United States Triumphal Arch, would be topped by a statue personifying Liberty.

== Events ==
=== Washington, D.C. ===
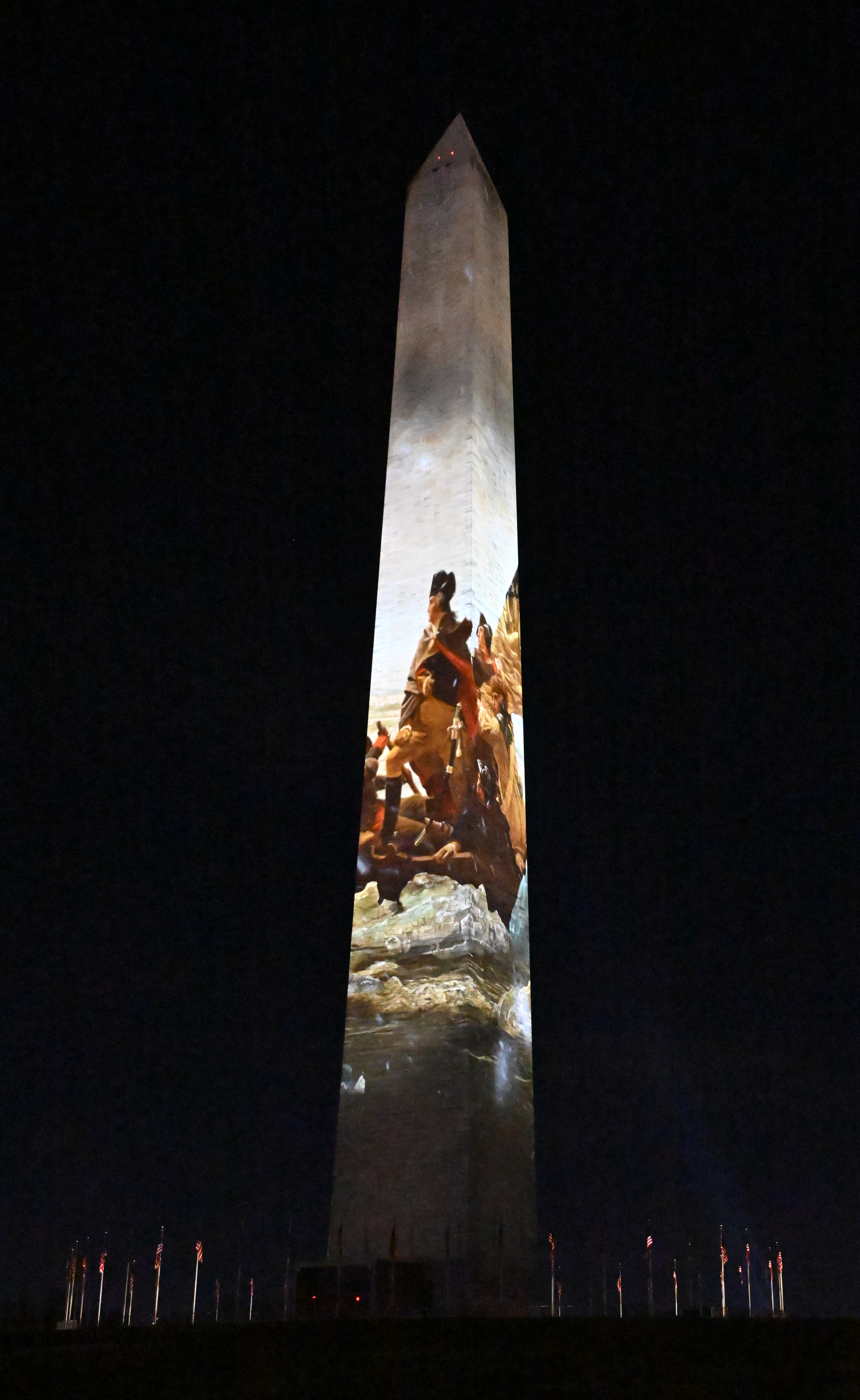
Washington Crossing the Delaware projected on the Washington Monument January 1, 2026

From December 31, 2025, to January 5, 2026, stories about how America was discovered, its independence, and future were projected on the sides of the Washington Monument. The White House also sponsored the "Rededicate 250" prayer gathering on May 17, 2026. A temporary 5,000 seat Ultimate Fighting Championship (UFC) arena was erected on the South Lawn of the White House for UFC White House on June 14, 2026, the first professional sporting event on White House grounds.

The semiquincentennial was the hottest recorded July 4 in Washington, D.C., at 102 °F (39 °C), breaking the previous record of 100 °F (38 °C), set in 1919. Several events were disrupted or canceled as a result of the high heat.

On June 24, 2026, Trump opened the Great American State Fair on the National Mall. The fair was originally supposed to feature food and cultural booths from all states and territories, along with displays from federal agencies. Connecticut, Illinois, Maine, Massachusetts, North Carolina, Oregon, Pennsylvania, Rhode Island, Vermont, and Washington did not officially participate.

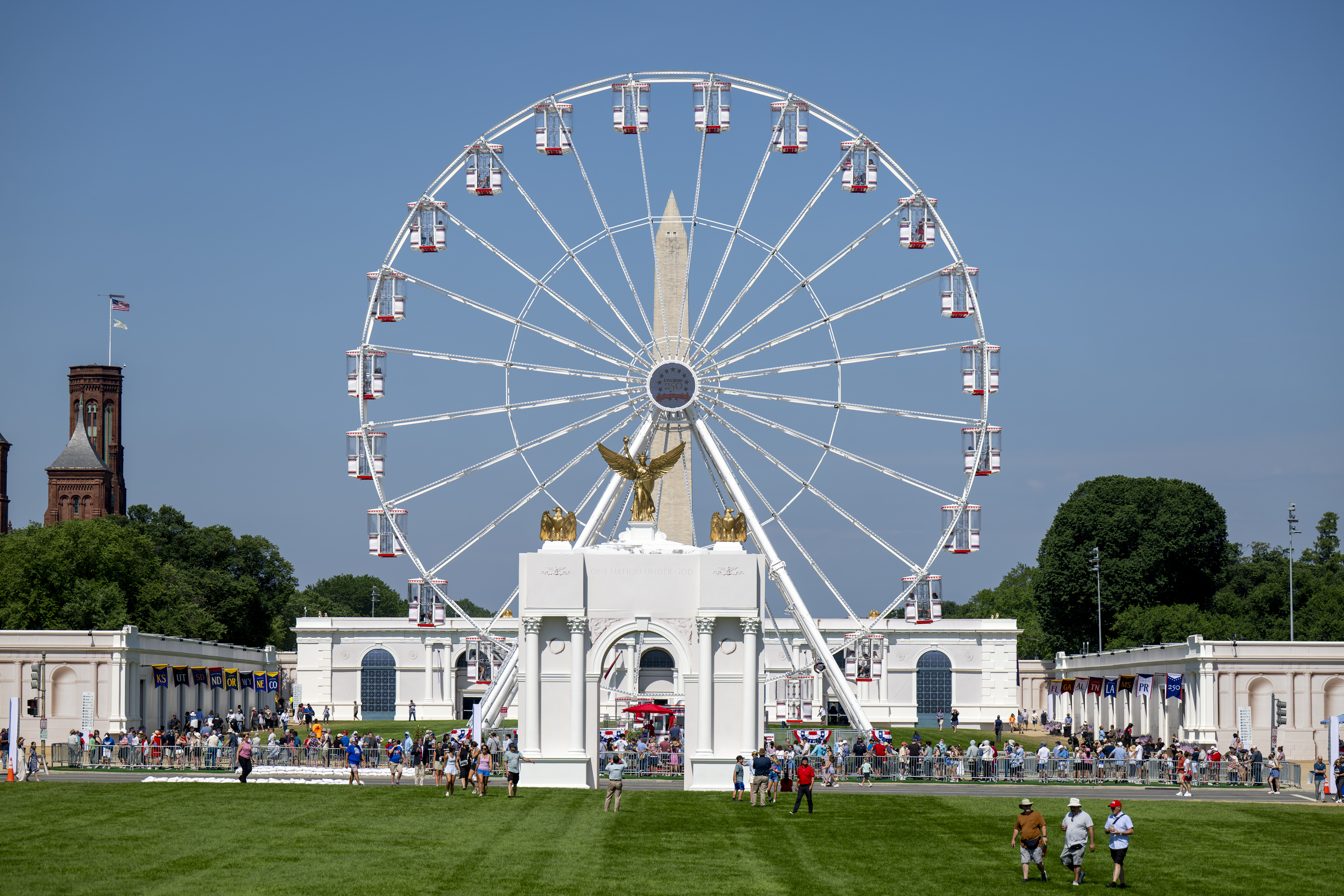
View of the Great American State Fair

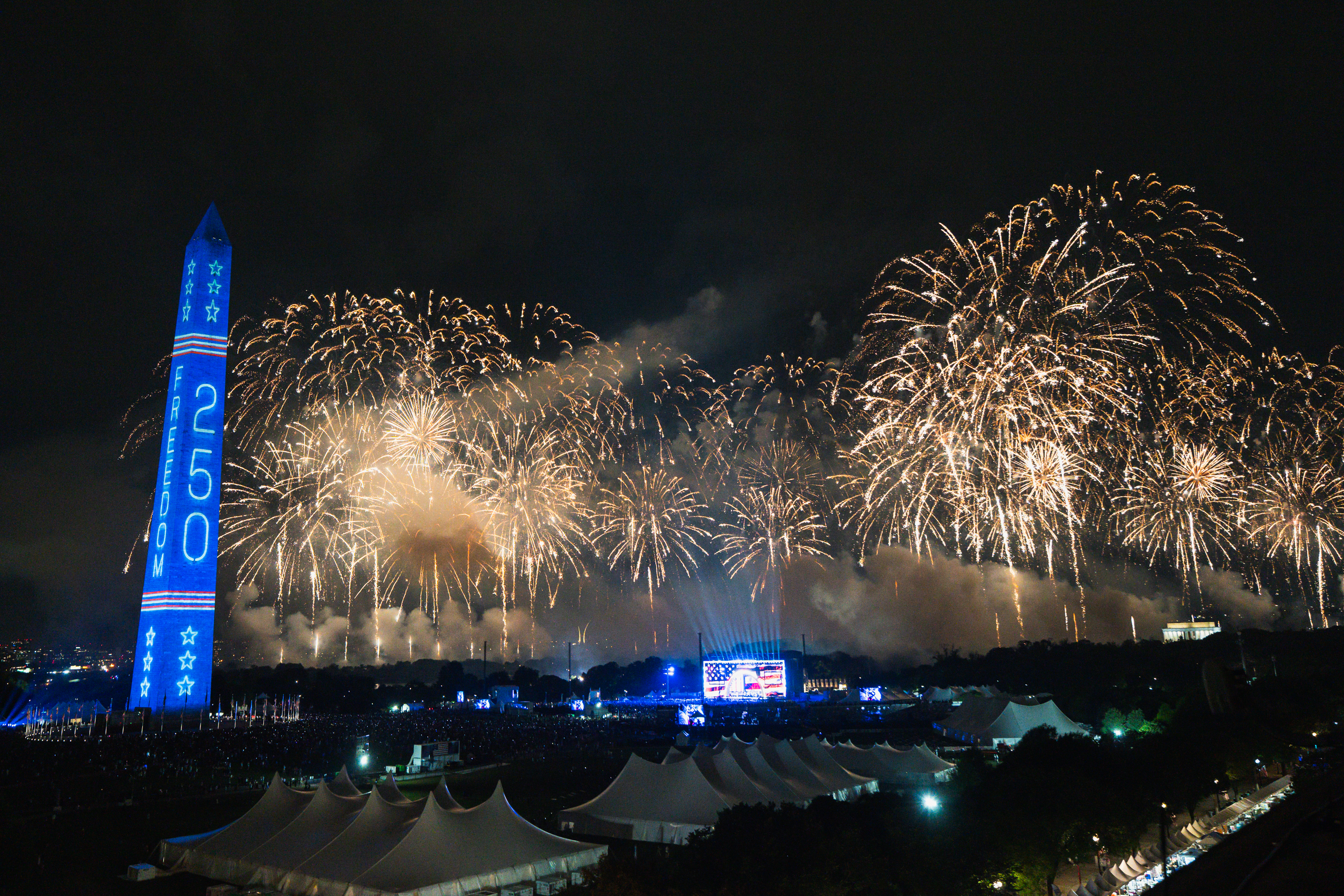
Salute to America event in Washington, D.C., July 5, 2026

A Ferris wheel was installed, and a scaled-down model of the proposed United States Triumphal Arch was displayed. The Washington Post reported opening day attendance was "relatively sparse compared with past National Mall events". On June 26, Trump claimed that the fair was "packed with happy people". According to Fox News, only a few hundred people could be seen, but a reporter claimed there were many more people somewhere else.

The fair was marred by multiple controversies and logistical issues. Power outages led to Ferris wheel malfunctions and caused booths to close due to lack of air conditioning. Multiple artists were slated to perform at an opening festival, but pulled out due to the event's association with Trump's political Freedom 250 organization. A video including the Confederate flag was shown at the North Carolina exhibit, causing controversy. Extreme weather affected the fair on the day of the holiday. On July 4, the fair was evacuated due to storms, and 11 people were sent to the hospital as a result of heat exhaustion.

President Trump, barring a hold due to thunderstorms appeared on the rostrum erected on the grounds of the Washington Monument and delivered a speech. Shortly after a pause, a lone B1 ("Bone") long range bomber flew alerting the crowd with the shaded backdrop of its afterburners under the night sky. The Bone passed by at length behind the Washington Monument and the fireworks commenced around midnight on July 5, approximately 850,000 fireworks were launched over a span of 40 minutes from various sites in Washington, D.C., including the National Mall, West Potomac Park, and eight Potomac River barges. This broke the record of nearly 811,000 fireworks, set by a Philippines megachurch in 2016. The city also briefly recorded the worst air quality of any major city in the world due to smog caused by the fireworks.

Freedom 250 Grand Prix

An IndyCar Series race, the Freedom 250 Grand Prix, was ordered by President Trump on January 30, 2026. It was held on August 23 on a street course around part of the National Mall in Washington, D.C.

==== Renewal efforts in D.C. ====
As part of the Semiquincentennial, the project was officially termed "Making the District of Columbia Safe and Beautiful" and included a total of $76 million towards infrastructure repair and renewal.

Infrastructure Sites Renewed Under the D.C. "Safe and Beautiful" Initiative (America 250)
Infrastructure Site	Project Type	What Was Repaired / Renewed	Project Cost	Primary Source Link
Columbus Circle Fountain	Fully Restored (Dry since ~2006)	Full internal mechanical and plumbing overhaul; masonry restoration of the historic basin outside Union Station.	$11,800,000	NPS News Release
Meridian Hill Park Cascading Fountain	Fully Restored (Dry since 2019)	Re-engineering and repair of the historic 13-basin Italian Renaissance-style cascade architecture and main pumps.	Part of $60M–$76M pool	NPS Landmark Page
Freedom Plaza Fountain	Fully Restored (Dry for ~10 years)	Replaced outdated underground filtration systems, plumbing lines, and structural surface sealant.	Part of $60M–$76M pool	NPS News Release
Lafayette Square Fountains	Fully Restored (Dry for ~10 years)	Complete equipment vault overhaul and plumbing infrastructure renewal directly facing the White House.	Part of $60M–$76M pool	Executive Order 14252
Lincoln Memorial Reflecting Pool	Major Infrastructure Upgrade	Comprehensive water line rehabilitation, filtration optimization, and structural cosmetic cleaning.	$13,100,000 to $16,000,000	Dept. of the Interior
Simón Bolívar Memorial Park Fountain	Fully Restored (Dry for several years)	Mechanical repairs to standard pump vaults and perimeter basin structural patching.	Part of $60M–$76M pool	NPS News Release
General Philip Sheridan Circle Fountain	Fully Restored (Dry for several years)	Embassy Row monument water distribution pipe replacement and electronic controls modernization.	Part of $60M–$76M pool	Executive Order 14252
John Marshall Park Fountain	Fully Restored	Basin structural integrity fixes and mechanical pump replacement.	Part of $60M–$76M pool	NPS News Release
John Paul Jones Memorial Fountain	Fully Restored	Specialized plumbing lines cleared and localized pump mechanics restored.	Part of $60M–$76M pool	NPS News Release
Rawlins Park Fountain	Fully Restored	Complete mechanical vault reconstruction and water filtration updates.	Part of $60M–$76M pool	NPS News Release
Dupont Circle Fountain	Mechanical / Aesthetic Upgrade	Modernization of the interior pump station, localized plumbing retrofits, and stone cleaning.	Part of $60M–$76M pool	NPS News Release
FDR Memorial Fountains	Mechanical / Aesthetic Upgrade	Replacement of extensive multi-tiered water pump arrays and structural sequence timing adjustments.	Part of $60M–$76M pool	NPS News Release
World War II Memorial Fountain	Mechanical / Aesthetic Upgrade	Comprehensive deep-cleaning, nozzle calibration, and reinforcement of high-pressure perimeter water systems.	Part of $60M–$76M pool	NPS News Release
Korean War Veterans Memorial Fountain	Mechanical / Aesthetic Upgrade	Upgrades to underlying filtration mechanisms and pool perimeter concrete reinforcement.	Part of $60M–$76M pool	NPS News Release
George Mason Memorial Fountain	Mechanical / Aesthetic Upgrade	Low-profile pump swap, piping repairs, and localized biological algae mitigation upgrades.	Part of $60M–$76M pool	NPS News Release

=== Philadelphia ===
Union Pacific 4014, the world's largest operating steam locomotive, traveled to Philadelphia for the semiquincentennial as part of its coast-to-coast tour and was displayed at the Navy Yard on July 4 and 5.

The Philadelphia Museum of Art (PMA) and the Pennsylvania Academy of The Fine Arts put on "A Nation of Artists," a joint exhibition on the history of American art.

The "Salute to Independence Semiquincentennial Parade" was intended to feature 50 different marching bands, 19 floats, and all 52 Miss America state and territory titleholders. The parade, planned for July 3, 2026, was cancelled due to extreme heat.

"One Philly: Unity Concert for America" was held on Benjamin Franklin Parkway, outside the PMA, on July 4. Hosted by Wanda Sykes; the free concert featured performances by Infinity Song, Seal, Jordan Davis, Jill Scott, The Roots, Kathy Sledge, State Property, Meek Mill, DJ Jazzy Jeff, and Will Smith before concluding with a fireworks display. Christina Aguilera was unable to perform due to a weather delay.

The 96th Major League Baseball All-Star Game was held at Philadelphia's Citizens Bank Park in mid-July after the semiquincentennial, echoing the 47th All-Star Game held at Philadelphia's Veterans Stadium in 1976 during the bicentennial. Part of the 2026 FIFA World Cup was held at the Lincoln Financial Field in between June and July (including a Round of 16 match on July 4). Additionally, the 2026 PGA Championship was held in May at Aronimink Golf Club in the Philadelphia suburb of Newtown Square, Pennsylvania.

=== New York City ===
Sergio Villavicencio, Vice-President of the Alexander Hamilton Awareness Society, is currently serving as the New York City Semiquincentennial Committee Chair. The Orange County Semiquincentennial Commission was created in 2019, while, in June 2021, the New York State 250th Commemoration Act was enacted, creating a state-wide commission in charge of Semiquincentennial celebrations at the state-level. Part of the 2026 FIFA World Cup, including the final match, was held at MetLife Stadium in New Jersey between June and July, co-hosting the championship with 15 other venues between Canada, the United States and Mexico, including the "leading cities" of Philadelphia and Boston, at the Lincoln Financial Field and Gillette Stadium, respectively.

In December 2025, it was announced that the Times Square ball drop on New Year's Eve would feature a collaboration with the Semiquincentennial Commission to launch America250, and that a special one-off edition of the event, the first outside of New Year's Eve, would take place on July 3, 2026, to count down to midnight on July 4. The ball was lowered eight times for midnight in each U.S. time zone, with the earliest at 10 a.m. ET for the Chamorro Time Zone (Guam and the Northern Mariana Islands), a highlighted event at midnight ET, and the last at 7 a.m. ET the following morning for the Samoa Time Zone (American Samoa). The event was accompanied by public festivities inside One Times Square on July 4 and 5.

The United States Navy hosted the seventh International Fleet Review, Sail250, in New York Harbor on July 4, 2026, which incorporated OpSail 2026. It is estimated that 60 ships from 30 countries took part, in the largest maritime gathering in U.S. history.

The Macy's 4th of July Fireworks event that night started half an hour earlier at 9:02 p.m. due to the threat of thunderstorms in the Tri-State area. Despite that, the event featured 85,000 fireworks that lit up the sky in 30 colors from 6 barges.

=== Charleston ===
Charleston, South Carolina, chosen due to its past as one of the "locations that witnessed the assertion of American liberty", with the establishment of the South Carolina American Revolution Sestercentennial Commission in 2018, planned battle reenactments and anniversary festivities.

=== Other places ===
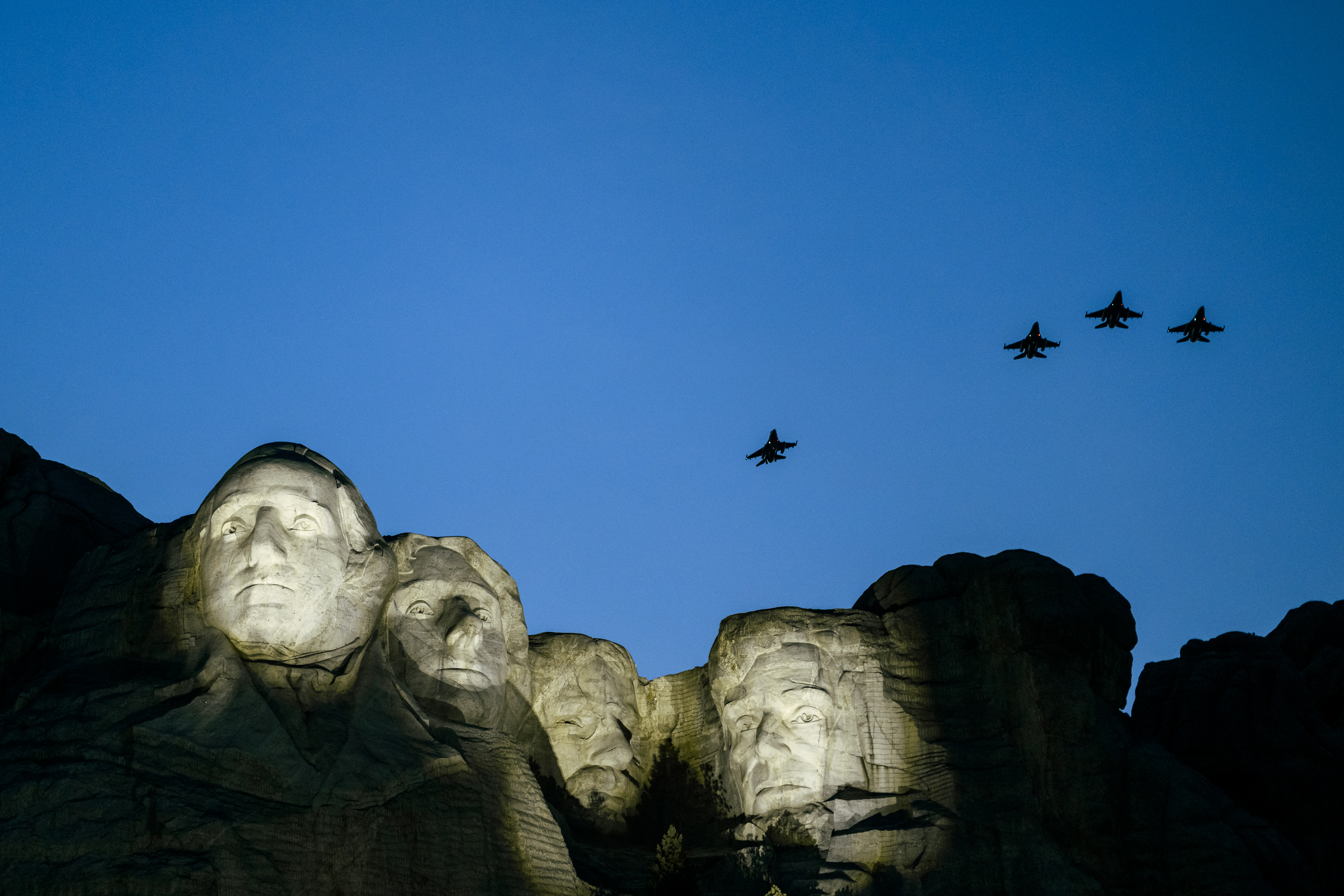
Military aircraft perform flyovers as President Donald J. Trump delivers remarks at Mount Rushmore National Memorial in Keystone, South Dakota, July 3, 2026

2026 Fourth of July Parade in Chico, California

Part of the 2026 FIFA World Cup was held at Gillette Stadium in June and July, co-hosting the championship with 15 other venues between Canada, the United States and Mexico, including the "leading cities" of Philadelphia and New York City, at the Lincoln Financial Field and MetLife Stadium, respectively.

As part of America 250 celebrations in 2026, Boston Irish Tourism Association created a Revolutionary Irish Trail of public landmarks that chronicle the role of the Irish and Scots-Irish in the American Revolution.

==== Los Angeles ====
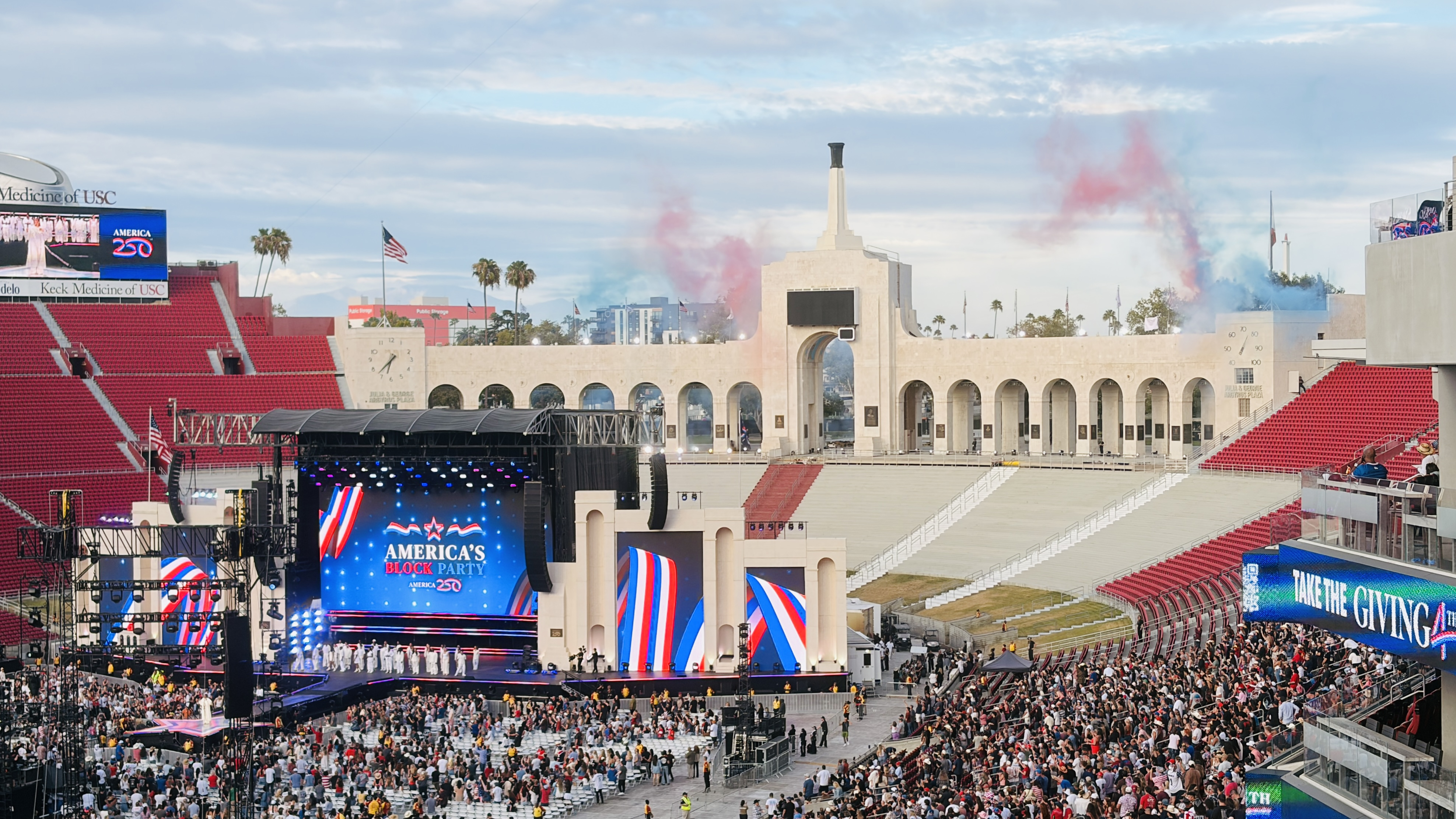
The celebration at Los Angeles Memorial Coliseum

The California city celebrated with "America's Block Party", an event at the Los Angeles Memorial Coliseum, part of a series of block party concerts hosted by America250. The celebration was hosted by Queen Latifah and featured music by Chris Stapleton, The Smashing Pumpkins, Anthony Ramos, Maren Morris, and Chaka Khan. The event featured a drone show and a massive fireworks show over the peristyle. Tickets were sold for $17.76 (a reference to the year the United States was founded) and proceeds were donated to Feeding America. Los Angeles County and the City of Los Angeles also hosted a celebration that was held at Grand Park in downtown Los Angeles, the largest semiquincentennial celebration in the western U.S., featuring a block party with multiple stages, a Ferris wheel, music, and vendors.

==== Marine Corps Base Camp Pendleton ====
Camp Pendleton in California had a "live-fire Amphibious Capabilities" demonstration on October 18, 2025, that celebrated the Marine Corps' 250th birthday and the semiquincentennial. As a precaution, the California Highway Patrol closed 17 miles (27 km) of Interstate 5 against the guidance of federal officials. During the closure, debris from an exploding shell fell on parked CHP vehicles in Vice President JD Vance's protective detail.

==== Louisville ====
The Sons of the American Revolution (SAR) from its national society headquarters in Louisville, Kentucky, announced plans to develop a SAR Education Center and Museum to be opened prior to the 250th Anniversary, to house galleries and exhibits highlighting the patriot ancestors and the story of the American Revolution.

==== Pittsburgh ====
In 2019, the city of Pittsburgh organized the "Pittsburgh's United States 250 Celebration", which was planned to feature a "Freedom Train" with black and gold colors, musical celebrations with the Pittsburgh Symphony Orchestra, and a major firework display at Fort Pitt/Point State Park in the city's downtown area, with an all-day live parade through all city neighborhoods.

==== Denver ====
In 2026, Colorado also observed the 150th anniversary of Colorado entering the Union. The America 250 - Colorado 150 Commission was established to guide the Centennial State's twin commemorations.

==== San Francisco ====
In 2026, the San Francisco Bay Area also observed the 250th anniversary of the founding of San Francisco, as well as the 175th anniversary of Santa Clara University. Several events were held in honor of the Bay Area's triple celebrations, beginning with Super Bowl LX which was held at Levi's Stadium in Santa Clara on February 8, 2026, as well as part of the 2026 FIFA World Cup at the same stadium in June and July.

==== Medora, North Dakota ====
A presidential library dedicated to 26th president Theodore Roosevelt opened in the North Dakota Badlands, near Medora on July 4th.

==== Kennedy Space Center ====
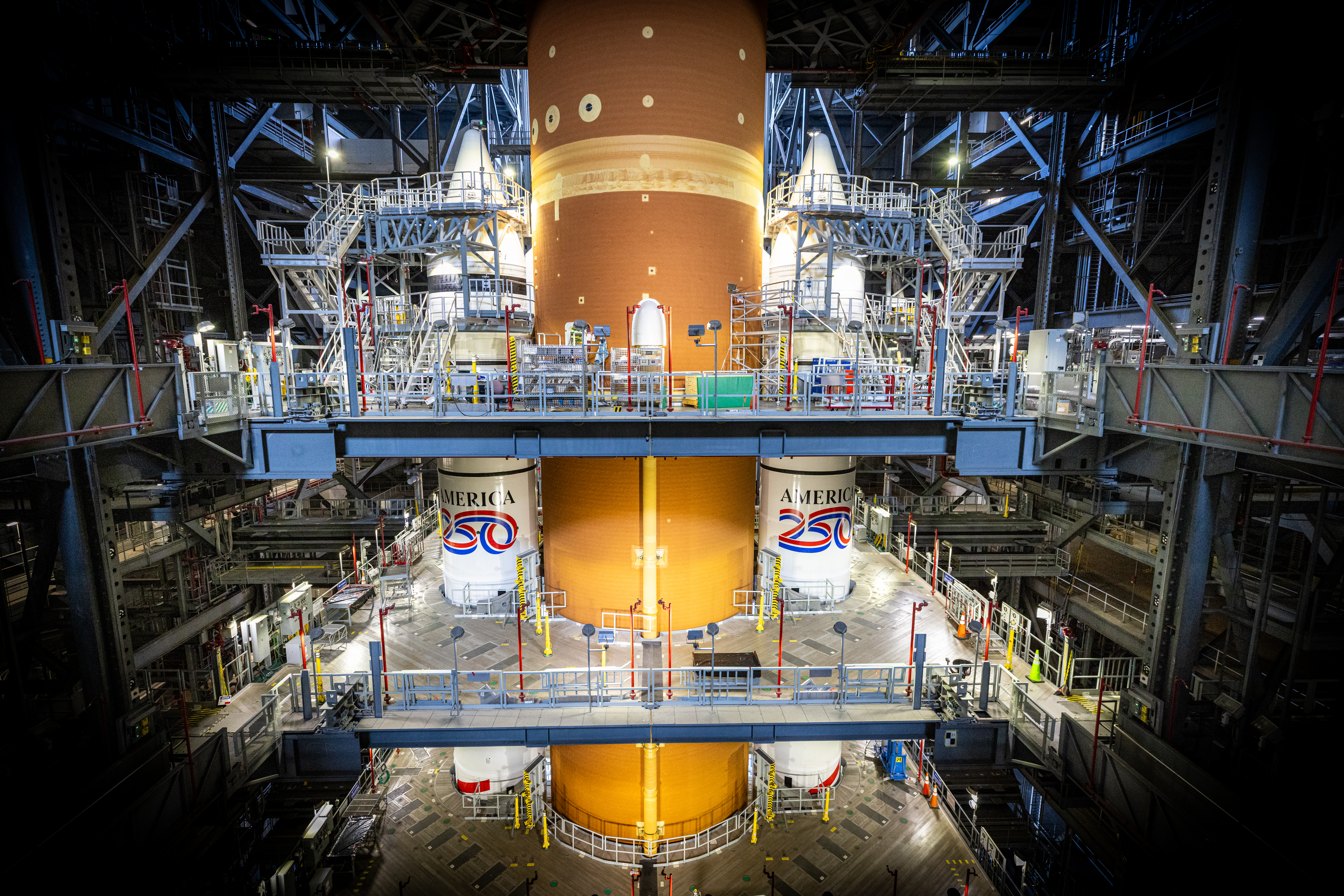
The America 250 logo on the Space Launch System rocket boosters of Artemis II in December 2025

In November 2025, technicians at NASA's Kennedy Space Center in Florida applied the semiquincentennial logo onto the solid rocket boosters of the Space Launch System rocket for Artemis II, which launched in April 2026 and sent four astronauts around the Moon, becoming the first crewed flight beyond low Earth orbit since the end of the Apollo program in 1972.

==== Versailles, France ====
On June 17, 2026, President Trump was invited for dinner at the Palace of Versailles by French president Emmanuel Macron to celebrate the semiquincentennial and to sign the peace treaty ending the 2026 Iran war. Treaties of the 1783 Peace of Paris, including the Treaty of Paris which ended the American Revolutionary War, were signed at Versailles.

== Religious acts ==
A Freedom 250-organized Christian jubilee known as "Rededicate 250" was held on the National Mall on May 17, 2026. Described as a "rededication of our country as one nation under God", the event primarily featured Christian evangelists such as Franklin Graham and Samuel Rodriguez among others, video messages from Trump and other administration figures promoting evangelicalism, and appearances by Sadie Robertson Huff, Jonathan Roumie, and musician Chris Tomlin. The event received criticism from historians and religious organizations for promoting a Christian nationalist interpretation of American history.

On June 11, 2026, as part of the United States Conference of Catholic Bishops' (USCCB) Spring Plenary Assembly at the Basilica of Mary, Queen of the Universe in Orlando, USCCB president and Archbishop of Oklahoma City Paul Coakley held a service to consecrate the United States to the Sacred Heart of Jesus, with the purpose of praying for healing, peace, reconciliation, and justice for the country amid the semiquincentennial. It was preceded by a national novena of prayer and various spiritual activities, including 250 hours of adoration and 250 works of mercy. Coakley stated that the service was in the spirit and continuation of Pope Leo XIII's consecration of the human race on the same day in 1899. President Trump issued a statement honoring the consecration as "a poignant reminder that America has always been guided by the loving hand of God".

== Reactions ==
Frosted sugar cookies made to celebrate the United States Semiquincentennial

The launch of semiquincentennial celebrations occurred amidst political division and record-low approval ratings for the sitting president. These celebrations were described as featuring competing narratives over American history, such as with conflicts over the removal of Confederate monuments and memorials. The Economist described them as "shaping up not as mere metaphor but as a straightforward display of America's fractured state".

Trump's cost-cutting measures across the federal government were described as complicating celebrations, with funding cuts for the National Endowment for the Humanities leading to grant terminations for several state humanities councils that were working on programming for the 250th celebration. CNN reported that state and local planners expressed fears over the president's brand of politics and funding cuts, writing that they were "concerned about a lack of resources to put on their own events and fear that the overall tenor will turn partisan as opposed to unifying, leaving little room for meaningful reflection on the nation's past".

Differences between the events and initiatives hosted by the bipartisan America 250 and the Trump-aligned Freedom 250 organizations caused public confusion by artists and performers over their association with the Trump administration. The Associated Press reported that Trump's own celebrations had "overshadowed" the bipartisan commission and that his second term's actions led to comparisons with King George III or a monarch, which Trump both rejected and endorsed.

=== Politicization and protests ===
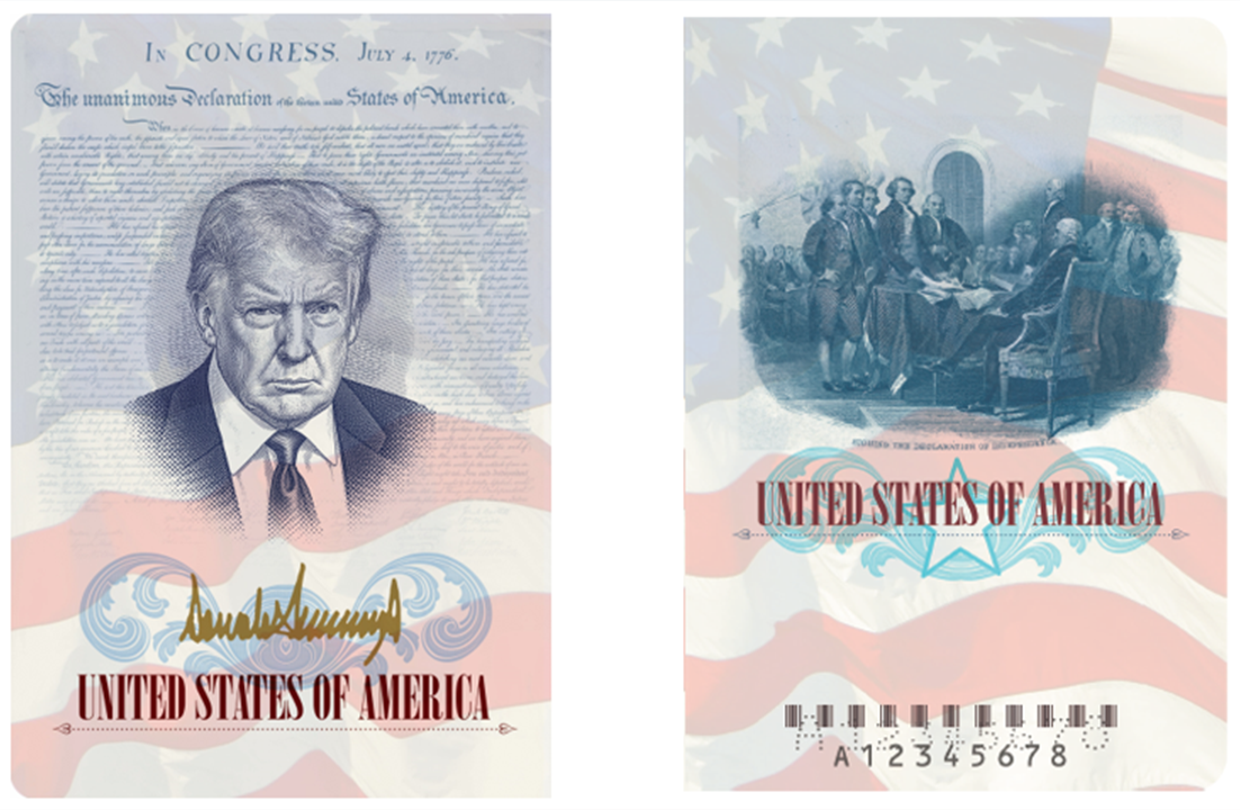
Inner covers of a new limited-edition United States passport design for the Semiquincentennial featuring the United States Declaration of Independence, an 1818 John Trumbull painting, and Donald Trump

Criticism of the celebrations for politicization and praising Trump and conservatism emerged over official programming decisions. Several artists who had been invited to perform at the event publicly announced their decision to decline participation. Their objections stemmed from a shared belief that what had originally been presented to them as a nonpartisan, neutral gathering had gradually become associated with President Trump and, in their view, taken on a political character. A June 2026 Reuters/Ipsos poll found a majority of Americans, including three-quarters of Democrats and half of Republicans, believed events celebrating the country's 250th anniversary had grown too political.

Axios described them as taking on a "MAGA bent" since January 2025, with Trump coming up with and announcing more ideas for celebrations throughout the year. These events included a "soft launch" of America250 festivities during Trump's military parade in June 2025 that became overshadowed by the millions across the country who protested on the same day during the No Kings protests. The Economist described the Trump administration's March 2025 executive order requesting an audit of federal historical sites and the Smithsonian Museum to remove "divisive narratives" viewed as promoting DEI and "leftist" ideologies, such as ordering the removal of signs mentioning slavery at national parks, as an example of the nation's history becoming a "partisan battleground" ahead of the festivities.

During the opening announcement for America250 in Des Moines, Iowa, on July 3, 2025, Trump criticized Democrats, saying "I hate them" and that "I cannot stand them, because I really believe they hate our country", and also said those who voted against his One Big Beautiful Bill Act "hate our country". He also mocked former president Joe Biden's speaking style, repeated his lie of a stolen 2020 election, criticized the "fake news" media, and engaged in campaign-style rhetoric praising his accomplishments and suggesting he was the greatest president in United States history. The Associated Press called Trump as viewing "patriotism as inseparable from his own agenda", and the event featured large amounts of pro-Trump campaign gear and memorabilia. The Guardian described Trump's July 4 speech at Mount Rushmore as "an extraordinary partisan attack" with anti-immigrant, anti-progressive themes and a denouncement of communism. That same day, New York City Mayor Zohran Mamdani delivered a speech at Washington's old desk, criticizing Trumpism and inequality, and said America was not exceptional because it was more powerful but because Americans collectively worked towards its founding ideals.

The America 250 Civics Education Coalition was formed with oversight from the Department of Education, with the America First Policy Institute leading a coalition of more than 40 conservative organizations, including Turning Point USA, the Heritage Foundation, and Hillsdale College. The White House stated it had sent letters to state governors and ambassadors to display its "Founder's Museum" exhibit made in partnership with PragerU in capitols, schools, and embassies. The exhibit received criticism from historians for blurring history with AI-generated fiction and having historical characters repeat the phrase "facts don't care about your feelings" popularized by conservative commentator Ben Shapiro. Freedom 250's "Freedom Trucks" exhibit was funded by $10 million worth of congressionally authorized funding diverted from America 250, and was criticized as being made by conservative Hillsdale College and PragerU and prominently featuring quotes by Trump and a video he filmed inside the Oval Office. Joseph A. McCartin of Georgetown University described the Freedom 250 resources as a "coloring book version of U.S. history" that "remove[s] the complex questions that have shaped our history".

In 2026, the State Department announced that as part of the Semiquincentennial, new passports would be issued featuring an image of Donald Trump. A spokesperson of the United States Department of State stated that "As the United States celebrates America’s 250th anniversary in July, the State Department is preparing to release a limited number of specially designed U.S. Passports to commemorate this historic occasion". The move came after the Department of the Interior placed Trump's face on "America the Beautiful" level park passes in 2025 also as part of the nation's 250 birthday celebrations. Interior Secretary Doug Burgum stated the new passes bearing Trump's face would be "honoring America’s 250th anniversary and the generations who have protected our lands".

On the morning of Independence Day, approximately 400 members of the white supremacist group Patriot Front arrived in Washington DC and marched through the city while chanting "Reclaim America!" and holding Confederate flags.

Many donors to America250 have been seen as Trump-friendly, including Amazon, Coinbase, and the Ultimate Fighting Championship.

==== Great American State Fair ====
In May 2026, nearly all of the announced musical artists publicly backed out of the Freedom 250 concert series, the "Great American State Fair", and publicly criticized the events for politicization and connection to the Trump administration. Trump later called for canceling the concert series and said he would headline a MAGA rally at the Lincoln Memorial and Washington Monument.

In June 2026, seven states pulled out of the Great American State Fair, which The New York Times described as "the latest sign that the national 250th birthday celebration has become a fragmented and partisan affair as the president seeks his imprint".

North Carolina was one such state, where private organizations and businesses funded and organized the booth for the state; the booth was discovered displaying the Confederate flag, leading to online outrage. The image was quickly removed from the booth, and at least one business sponsor, Mt. Olive Pickles, withdrew its support and issued a statement that it had been unaware of the inclusion of the image.

NBC News described opening ceremonies for the fair as being a politicized, rally-style event, with Trump boasting about his accomplishments such as ending the "transgender mutilation of children" and that roughly half of the events' participants wore Trump slogans or had his likeness on their clothes. It noted a highly partisan speech from Transportation Secretary Sean Duffy, who highlighted the new musical lineup as "way better than those libtards that canceled on us" and declaring Trump the greatest president since George Washington.

=== Currency featuring Donald Trump ===
==== Trump commemorative coin ====
The decision of the US Mint to create a two-headed commemorative $1 coin of Trump was widely criticized by historians as antithetical to America's anti-monarchical ethos. It was described as coming in spite of a 2005 congressional authorization that stated coins should not "bear the image of a living former or current president". Treasury Secretary Scott Bessent stated that a 2020 law allowed "designs emblematic of the United States semiquincentennial" and that "there is no profile more emblematic for the front of this coin than that of our serving President, Donald J. Trump." The New York Times highlighted passages from the law which also stated "No head and shoulders portrait or bust of any person, living or dead, and no portrait of a living person may be included in the design on the reverse of any coin", which would make such a decision likely illegal.

In early 2026, the Mint proposed an additional "review and discussion of a Semiquincentennial Gold Coin" that would feature Trump to the Citizens Coinage Advisory Committee. Acting chairman Donald Scarinci criticized the decision, writing that:

For 250 years, since that great document was signed — with a few controversial exceptions — no nation on earth has issued coins with the image of a democratically elected leader during the time of their service. Only those nations ruled by kings or dictators display the image of their sitting ruler on the coins of the realm. God bless America, and may God preserve our nation.

The only other president to be depicted on coinage despite federal law was during the 150th anniversary celebrations in 1926, when coinage was made depicting then sitting President Calvin Coolidge as part of the United States Sesquicentennial coinage.

==== Trump signature on paper currency and proposed $250 banknote ====
Obverse of a Series 2025 $100 note with the signature of the U.S. President Donald Trump

In April 2026, Trump appointees began printing $100 bills with Trump's signature to replace the Secretary of the Treasury and produced mock-ups for a $250 banknote bearing Trump's portrait to celebrate the nation's 250th anniversary. The moves were criticized for breaking federal law according to currency experts. Additionally, no new U.S. currency can be adopted without the explicit approval of Congress.

On July 3, 2026, a day before the 250th anniversary, President Trump posted a new image of the $100 bill featuring his signature on the social media site Truth Social, with those notes expected to be in circulation by the end of the year. Other denominations featuring the updated signature layout are scheduled to be released in the coming months.
