= Mitch Greenlick =

American politician (1935–2020)

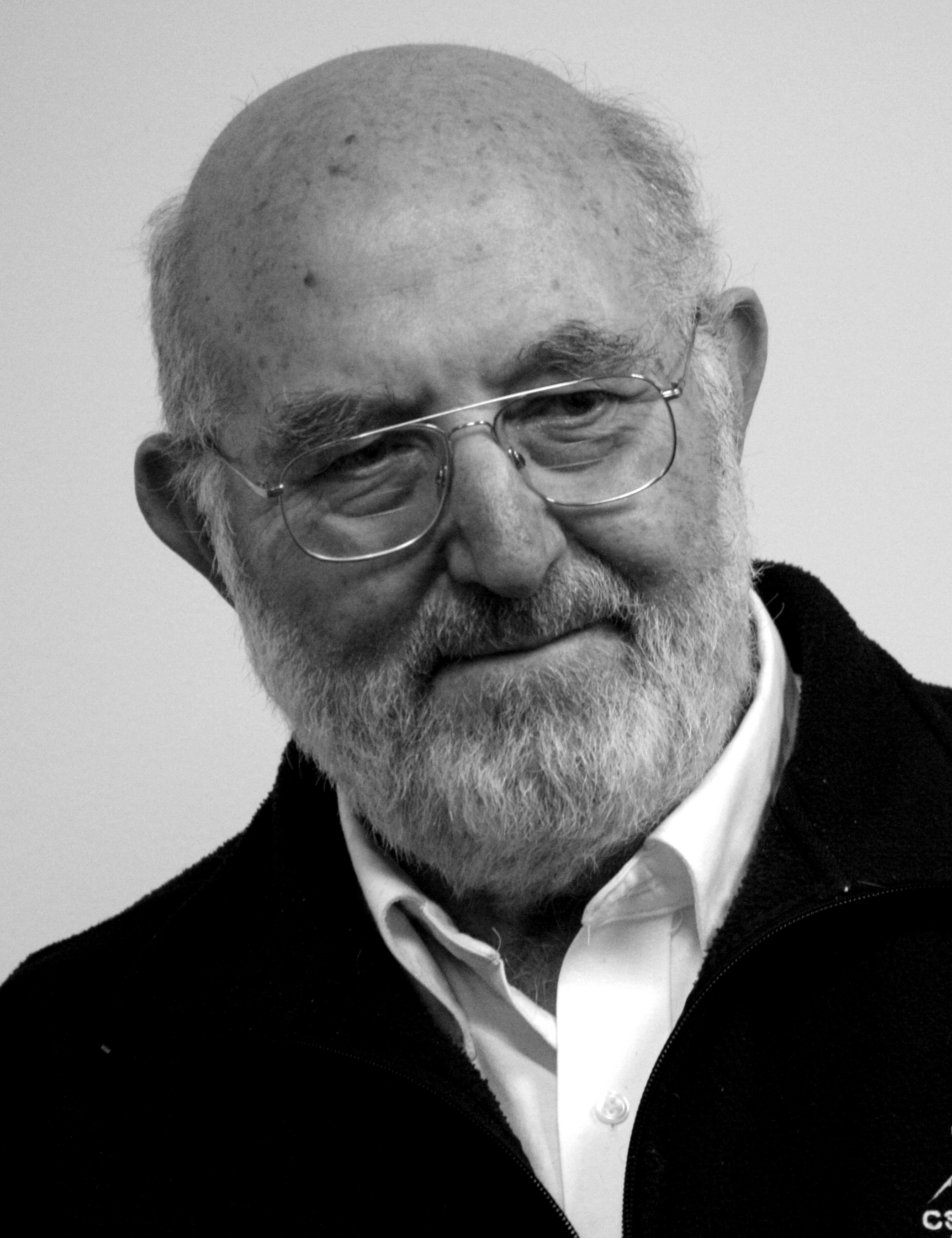

Member of the Oregon House of Representatives from the 33rd district
- In office January 13, 2003 – May 15, 2020
- Preceded by: Bill Witt
- Succeeded by: Maxine Dexter

Personal details
- Born: Merwyn Ronald Greenlick; March 12, 1935 Detroit, Michigan, U.S.
- Died: May 15, 2020 (aged 85) Portland, Oregon, U.S.
- Party: Democratic
- Education: Wayne State University; University of Michigan

Merwyn Ronald "Mitch" Greenlick (March 12, 1935 – May 15, 2020) was a Democratic politician from the U.S. state of Oregon. He represented District 33 of the Oregon House of Representatives.

== Early life and career ==
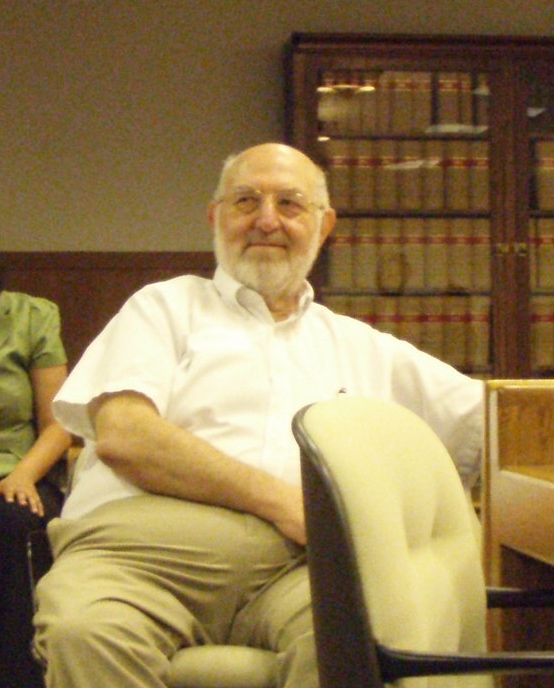
Greenlick in 2008

Greenlick was born in 1935 in Detroit, Michigan, into a Jewish family. He attended McCarroll Elementary School and graduated from Central High School in 1952.

Greenlick was a 1957 graduate of Wayne State University, receiving his bachelor's degree in pharmacy. He received his Master's degree in pharmacy administration from Wayne State in 1961 and received a Ph.D. from the University of Michigan in health system organization in 1967. He moved with his family to Portland, Oregon, in 1964 to start and later direct the Kaiser Permanente Center for Health Research. He also was named Vice President of Kaiser Foundation Hospital in 1981. Starting in 1990, Greenlick served as Professor and Chair of Public Health and Preventive Medicine in the School of Medicine at Oregon Health Sciences University.

Greenlick had been active in his community as a board member of the Community Action Organization in Washington County and as a member of the Northwest Health Foundation Board.

== Political career ==
Greenlick first got involved in politics at the age of nine by volunteering for Franklin Delano Roosevelt's 1944 presidential campaign. After moving to Oregon, he worked for Neil Goldschmidt's 1970 campaign for city council. Greenlick also worked on the campaigns of Senator Ron Wyden and Governor John Kitzhaber.

In 2000, Greenlick ran against incumbent Republican Bill Witt in what was then House District 7. Witt was a conservative who had defeated the more liberal Republican Chuck Carpenter in the primary two years previously. Despite raising nearly $300,000, Greenlick narrowly lost the election. He ran again in 2002 after redistricting and defeated Erik T. Hartung by nearly 20 points (Witt had retired to run for the Oregon Senate).

Greenlick represented Northwest Portland and northern Washington County, which includes Helvetia, Bethany and Cedar Mill. After 2002, Greenlick never won an election with less than 64% of the vote. He faced a primary challenger only once, in 2006, whom he beat 92% to 8%.

Greenlick chaired the Health Care Committee from the 74th Legislative Assembly, which convened in 2007, until his death. During that assembly, he served on the Education Committee and Higher Education Subcommittee. In past legislative sessions, he served on the Transportation, Land Use, Environment and Rules committees.

Representative Greenlick proposed to make nicotine a Schedule III controlled substance (along with LSD). He was in favor of banning all tobacco products, requiring people in Oregon to obtain a doctor's prescription to get tobacco products (including cigars), and to impose a fine of $6,250, up to a year in prison, or both on offenders.

== Electoral history ==
Year	Candidate	Party	Percent	Opponent	Party	Percent	Opponent	Party	Percent	Opponent	Party	Percent
2000	Bill Witt	Republican	50.80%	Mitch Greenlick	Democratic	49.20%						
2002	Mitch Greenlick	Democratic	58.22%	Erik Hartung	Republican	37.32%	Anthony Ambrose	Libertarian	4.28%	Write-ins		0.18%
2004	Mitch Greenlick	Democratic	81.73%	David Long	Libertarian	12.07%	Thomas Humphrey, Jr.	Constitution	6.20%			
2006	Mitch Greenlick	Democratic	69.59%	Mark Eggleston	Republican	26.33%	David Long	Libertarian	3.86%	Write-ins		0.22%
2008	Mitch Greenlick	Democratic	69.59%	Jim Ellison	Republican	27.39%	Write-ins		0.34%			
2010	Mitch Greenlick	Democratic	64.82%	Michael Bieker	Republican	35.05%	Write-ins		0.14%			
2012	Mitch Greenlick	Democratic	69.03%	Stevan Kirkpatrick	Republican	30.72%	Write-ins		0.25%			
2014	Mitch Greenlick	Democratic	81.68%	Mark Vetanen	Libertarian	17.63%	Write-ins		0.69%			
2016	Mitch Greenlick	Democratic	69.45%	John Verbeek	Republican	30.33%	Write-ins		0.22%			
2018	Mitch Greenlick	Democratic	75.86%	Elizabeth Reye	Republican	23.97%	Write-ins		0.17%			

== Personal life ==
Greenlick was married to Harriet Greenlick from 1956 until his death, and together they had three children, including state judge Michael.

Greenlick was diagnosed with lymphoma in 2005 and recovered. He died on May 15, 2020, after battling numerous illnesses, at the age of 85.
