= Oregon's 33rd House district =

Legislative districts in the state of Oregon

Oregon's 33rd House district after redistricting after the 2020 Census

District 33 of the Oregon House of Representatives is one of 60 House legislative districts in the state of Oregon. As of 2021, the boundary for the district contains portions of Multnomah and Washington counties. The district includes parts of downtown Portland as well as most of the northwestern part of the city, including Forest Park, as well as slices of St. Johns, West Haven-Sylvan, and Beaverton. The district has been represented since September 2024 by Democrat Shannon Jones Isadore of Portland, who was appointed following the resignation of Maxine Dexter in August 2024.

== Election results ==
District boundaries have changed over time. Therefore, representatives before 2021 may not represent the same constituency as today. General election results from 2000 to present are as follows:

Year	Candidate	Party	Percent	Opponent	Party	Percent	Opponent	Party	Percent	Write-in percentage
2000	Vic Backlund	Republican	100.00%	Unopposed						
2002	Mitch Greenlick	Democratic	58.22%	Erik Hartung	Republican	37.32%	Anthony Ambrose	Libertarian	4.28%	0.18%
2004	Mitch Greenlick	Democratic	81.73%	David Long	Libertarian	12.07%	Thomas Humphrey Jr.	Constitution	6.20%	
2006	Mitch Greenlick	Democratic	69.59%	Mark Eggleston	Republican	26.33%	David Long	Libertarian	3.86%	0.22%
2008	Mitch Greenlick	Democratic	69.59%	Jim Ellison	Republican	27.39%	No third candidate			0.34%
2010	Mitch Greenlick	Democratic	64.82%	Michael Bieker	Republican	35.05%	No third candidate			0.14%
2012	Mitch Greenlick	Democratic	69.03%	Stevan Kirkpatrick	Republican	30.72%	No third candidate			0.25%
2014	Mitch Greenlick	Democratic	81.68%	Mark Vetanen	Libertarian	17.63%	No third candidate			0.69%
2016	Mitch Greenlick	Democratic	69.45%	John Verbeek	Republican	30.33%	No third candidate			0.22%
2018	Mitch Greenlick	Democratic	75.86%	Elizabeth Reye	Republican	23.97%	No third candidate			0.17%
2020	Maxine Dexter	Democratic	75.64%	Dick Courter	Republican	24.23%	No third candidate			0.13%
2022	Maxine Dexter	Democratic	84.82%	Stan Baumhofer	Republican	15.08%	No third candidate			0.10%
2024	Shannon Jones Isadore	Democratic	83.6%	Stan Baumhofer	Republican	12.6%	Thomas J Busse	Libertarian	3.6%	0.2%

== See also ==
- Oregon Legislative Assembly
- Oregon House of Representatives
