= Shannon Jones Isadore =

American politician

Member of the Oregon House of Representatives from the 33rd district
- Incumbent
- Assumed office September 27, 2024
- Preceded by: Maxine Dexter

Personal details
- Party: Democratic
- Education: Clark Atlanta University (BA); Loma Linda University (MA)

Shannon Jones Isadore is an American politician, psychotherapist, and healthcare clinic executive. A member of the Democratic Party, she has represented the 33rd district in the Oregon House of Representatives since September 2024.

== Early life and education ==
Isadore was raised in Portland and grew up in the Albina district. She received her bachelor's degree from Clark Atlanta University and her master's degrees from Loma Linda University. She is a U.S. Marine Corps veteran.

== Career ==
Isadore previously worked as an investment broker. She is the founder of the Oregon Change Clinic. The clinic is focused on substance abuse recovery and specializes in working with African Americans and veterans in Portland. The Oregon Change Clinic operates a 37-bed mental health and drug facility in Portland's Lloyd District.

=== Oregon House of Representatives ===
Isadore ran to represent the 33rd district in the Oregon House of Representatives in 2024 after incumbent Maxine Dexter chose to run for Congress. Her campaign was endorsed by former governor Kate Brown. She won the Democratic primary in May 2024. On September 27, 2024, she was appointed to serve the remainder of the Dexter's term following her resignation. She was elected to a full term on November 5 in the general election.

== Electoral history ==
2024 Oregon State Representative, 33rd district
Party	Candidate	Votes	%
Democratic	Shannon Jones Isadore	29,132	83.6
Republican	Stan Baumhofer	4,400	12.6
Libertarian	Thomas J Busse	1,258	3.6
Write-in		58	0.2
Total votes		34,848	100%
