= United States Triumphal Arch =

Proposed monument in Washington, D.C., United States

- Interactive map of United States Triumphal Arch
- Location: Washington, D.C., United States
- Coordinates: 38°53′8″N 77°3′36″W
- Type: Triumphal arch
- Height: 250 ft (76 m)
- Dedicated to: 250th anniversary of American independence

The United States Triumphal Arch or Independence Arch is a triumphal arch proposed by U.S. president Donald Trump in 2025 that would be located on Columbia Island in Washington, D.C., United States. The 250-foot-tall (76 m) arch would celebrate the 250th anniversary of American independence.

The site is Memorial Circle, a traffic circle on Memorial Drive between the end of the Arlington Memorial Bridge and Arlington National Cemetery. It is directly across the Potomac River from the Lincoln Memorial at the west end of the National Mall. Surveying work started in mid-May 2026 and the National Capital Planning Commission approved the project that November. A lawsuit was filed in February 2026 to halt construction before the required approval from the United States Congress and government agencies.

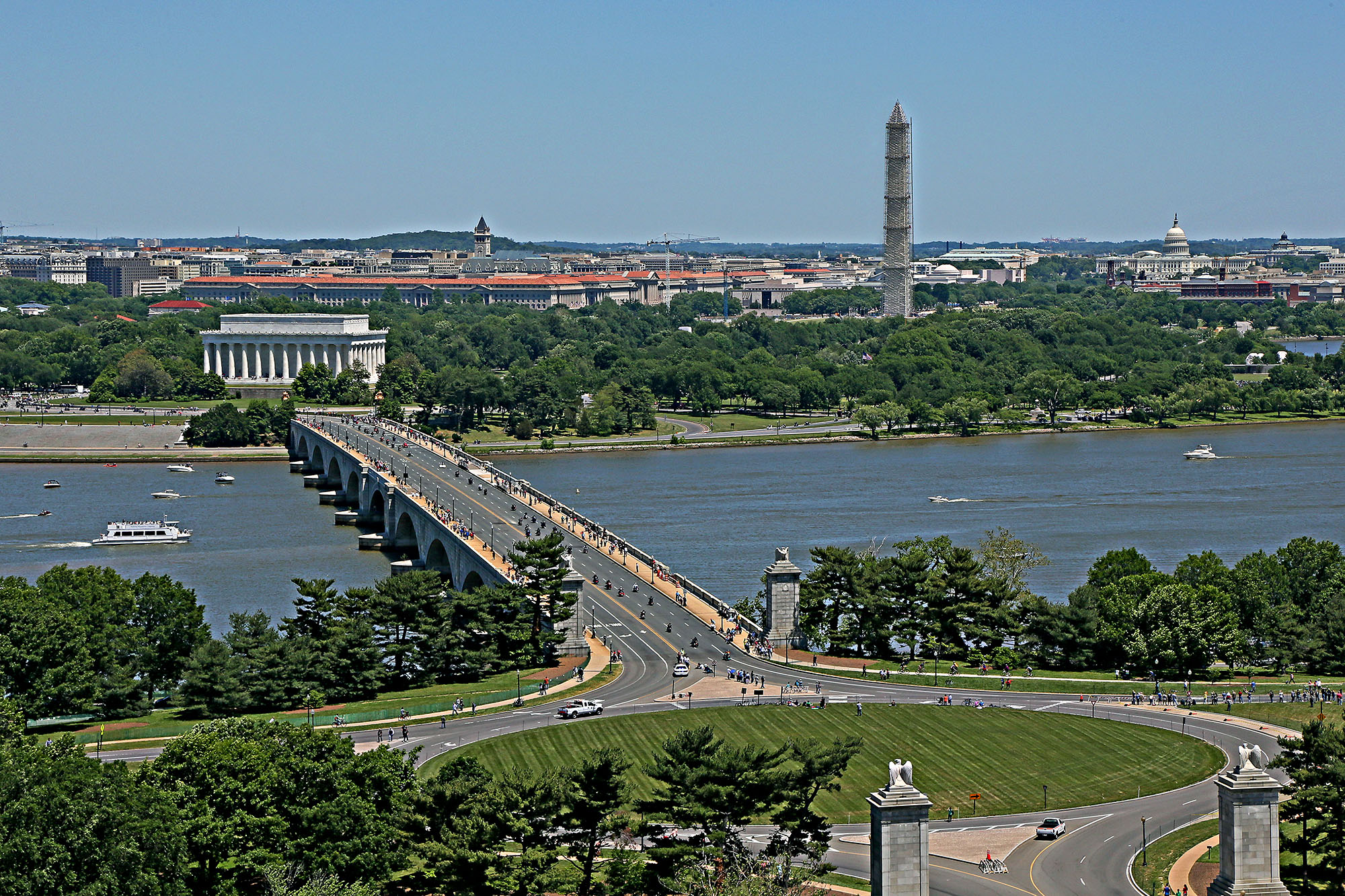
Memorial Circle in the foreground looking east over the Arlington Memorial Bridge

The arch has been referred to by some media outlets as the "Arc de Trump" (a play on the "Arc de Triomphe" located in Paris, France and Donald Trump, the 45th and 47th president of the United States).

== Concept ==
In an April 2025 article titled "Washington Needs an Arch", in the conservative publication The American Mind, art critic Catesby Leigh wrote about the visual effect that an arch would have on the axis of monuments on the National Mall. Leigh noted that Washington D.C. is the "only major Western capital without a monumental arch".

In an October 10, 2025, Washington Post article titled "Trump eyes a triumphal arch to mark America's 250th anniversary", Duncan G. Stroik, an architectural professor at the University of Notre Dame and former appointee to the United States Commission of Fine Arts, said that Memorial Circle was "underutilized" and said he "would want it to be a monument that is architecturally sophisticated, but also something that speaks to everyone."

== Development ==
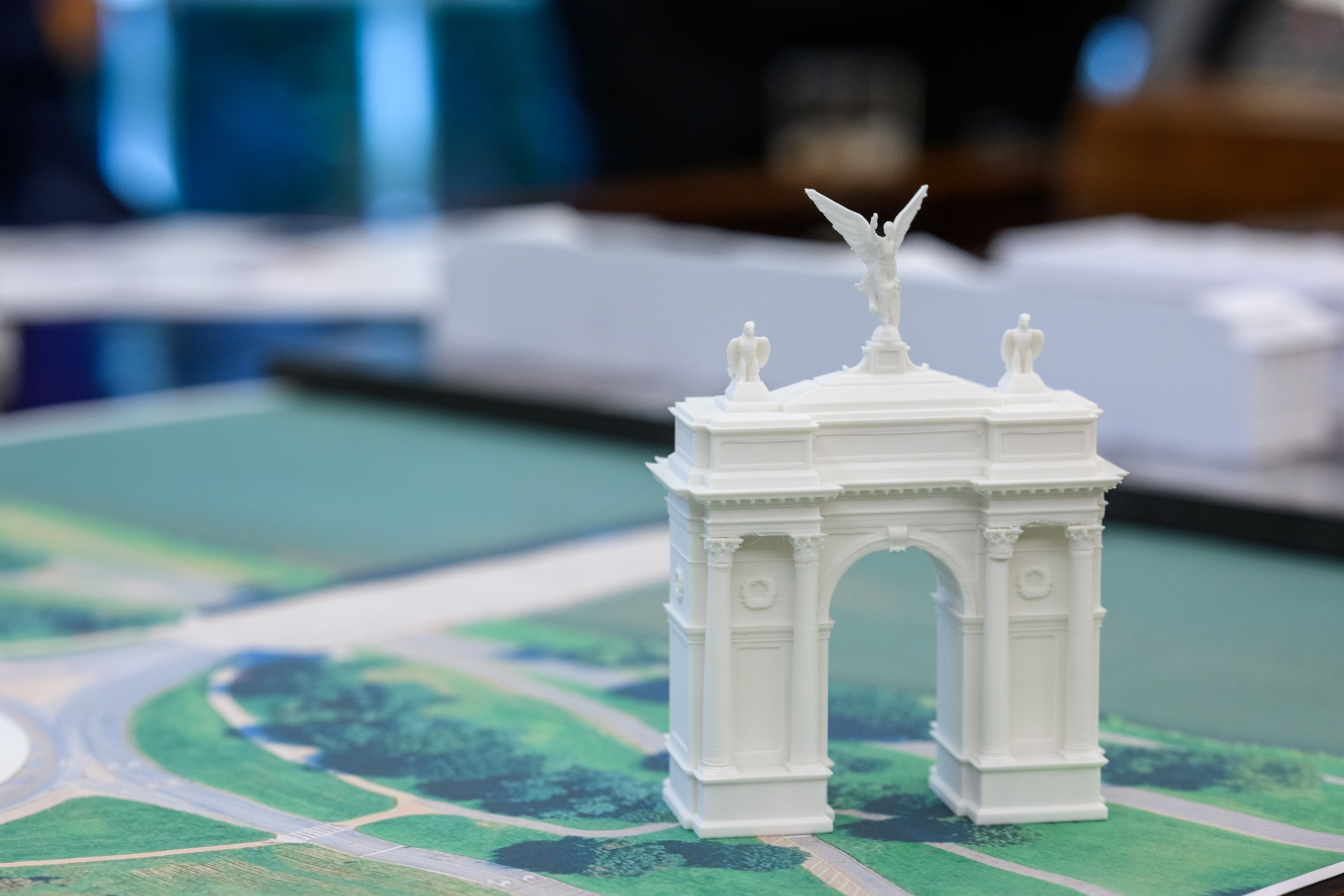
One of the scale models of the proposed arch in the Oval Office, Tuesday, October 7, 2025

On October 15, 2025, Trump showed reporters in the Oval Office a model sitting on his desk of a proposed arch that he wished to build. CBS reporter Ed O'Keefe asked him: "Who is it for?" Trump replied: "Me." He continued, "It's going to be beautiful." O'Keefe asked if it would be called "The Arc de Trump." The New Yorker later wrote that there is "as always with Trump, a great deal of defiance and sheer Rodney Dangerfield-style obnoxiousness implicit in the plan. It is an act of mischief as much as of monument-making."

Later that evening, guests were shown three differently scaled models of the arch at a dinner in the White House's East Room for donors to the ballroom expansion. The largest version would reportedly dwarf the iconic structures closest to it, including the Lincoln Memorial.

The large arch, which Anastasia Tsioulcas, writing for NPR, said was evocative of the neoclassical style favored by George Washington and Thomas Jefferson, would be surmounted by two eagles and a golden winged figure variously described as an angel or a suggestion of Victory. Trump said it represented Lady Liberty.

The arch would celebrate the 250th anniversary of the United States, and Trump said that construction of the arch would be completed in time for the anniversary. He said that it was "fully financed", and that some of the funds left over from the ballroom project would be used to fund the arch.

On December 16, 2025, Trump announced that Vince Haley was to be in charge of the project. On December 31, 2025, Trump said construction of the arch would start within two months. Nicolas Leo Charbonneau has been retained as the architect for the project.

On January 23, 2026, Trump presented another design of the Independence Arch, measuring 250 feet (75 meters), one foot for every year of the independence of the United States. This would be taller than the Arc de Triomphe, which measures 164 feet (50 meters), and almost half as tall as the Washington Monument, at 555 feet (169 meters).

After Trump opted for the largest design presented to him, some architects who were initially supportive of an arch (including Leigh) expressed their opposition to an arch of such size at the proposed location.

== Concerns and legal challenges ==
On February 19, 2026, the progressive advocacy group Public Citizen had filed a lawsuit on behalf of three Vietnam War veterans to stop the project, arguing it had not received proper approval from Congress or appropriate independent government agencies. They were concerned about the arch disrupting the sightline between the Lincoln Memorial and the Arlington House, a view that represents the national unity that came after the American Civil War. The impact on the solemnity of Arlington National Cemetery due to the proximity has also raised concerns. The observation deck in the arch would have tourists observing funerals and loom over veterans visiting the graves of their fallen comrades.

The Arlington County Board in October 2026 filed a lawsuit in federal court in Virginia over the failure to adequately evaluate potential environmental impacts of the project as required by federal law. Also in October, Washington, DC, and Virginia sued in federal court in Washington, DC to block the project, and on November 10, nine members of the Kennedy family joined the lawsuit.

== Site work and design approvals ==
By using an already existing AECOM contract, press research indicated the administration bypassed a public bidding process and geotechnical and site survey work for the Triumphal Arch started in mid-May 2026. The second Trump administration, stating that Congress had approved a similar project a century earlier that was never built, said this should cover the arch and thus it would not seek congressional approval. That original plan, ratified in 1925, provided for a pair of 166-foot-tall (51 m) columns.

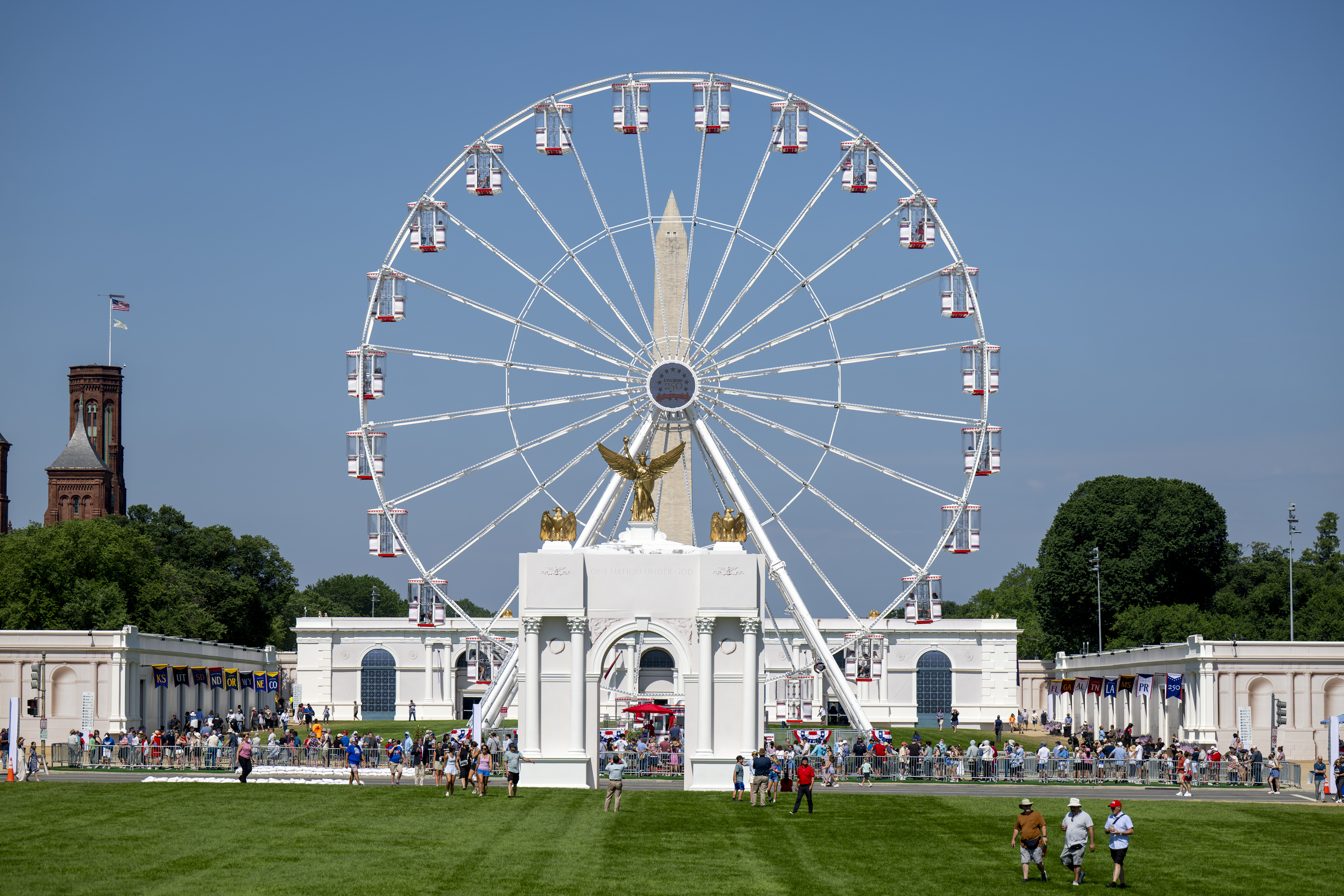
Scaled-down model at the Great American State Fair in June 2026

On May 21, 2026, the Commission of Fine Arts approved a revised design that eliminated an eight-foot-tall base (2.4 m) and four golden lions, which the Commission had pointed out were "not native to the United States". The arch itself was to remain 250 feet (76 m) tall.

On June 24, 2026, Trump opened the Great American State Fair on the National Mall as part of the 250th anniversary celebrations, where a scaled-down model of the arch was displayed.

Size comparison between the Washington Monument (555 ft/169.2 m), the United States Triumphal Arch (250 ft/76.2 m) and the White House (70 ft/21.4 m)

By law, the National Park Service had to assess the proposal. On August 3, it identified 37 sites that the proposed arch would negatively impact, mostly by obstructing their views.

On September 3, 2026, Interior Secretary Doug Burgum announced that initial excavation work for the arch would begin within two weeks. He called it the "Great Triumphal Arch and Military Observation Deck" in his social media post. Later in September, Trump announced he was updating construction plans at the "strong request" of the military for "national security purposes", and said that the arch would double as a "military complex" utilizing drones, snipers and storage for ammunition. The Washington Post called the new proposal part of an "evolving legal strategy" to justify and defend the project. This may also impact public access due to the security requirements for the storage of ammunition under federal law. While the final plan announced on October 16 did not have drones, snipers or ammunition, the Interior Department said it could "accommodat[e] the national security functions". On November 5, the National Capital Planning Commission heard eight hours of public testimony and then approved the structure by a vote of 8–4. An hour later, U.S. District Judge Tanya Chutkan blocked construction for 14 days, later extended for another two weeks. The ruling stated that "the court defers ruling on the District of Columbia and the Commonwealth of Virginia's Motion for Stay of Agency Action". The court denied the request for an administrative stay. The ruling also stated that "the court will HOLD IN ABEYANCE the Second Motion for Preliminary Injunction in Lemmon v. Trump". On November 20, US District Judge Leonie Brinkema issued a preliminary injunction, blocking construction. Brinkema said the government had inadequately assessed the project's economic and environmental impact, including on Reagan Washington National Airport.

Selected triumphal arches size comparison

Triumphal Arch

Monumento a la Revolución, Mexico City

Arc de Triomphe, Paris

Arc de Triomf, Barcelona

Arch of Titus, Rome

== See also ==
- 2026 Lincoln Memorial Reflecting Pool renovation – Rectangular pool in Washington, D.C.
- White House State Ballroom – Under-construction expansion to the White House
