= America 250 - Colorado 150 Commission =

Historical commission in Colorado, US

America 250 - Colorado 150
- Date: 2026
- Begins: July 1, 2025
- Ends: December 31, 2026
- Location: Colorado
- Years active: 2024 - 2026
- Organiser: America 250 - Colorado 150 Commission
- Website: www.historycolorado.org/america-250-colorado-150

America 250 - Colorado 150 Commission is the US state of Colorado's initiative to celebrate United States Semiquincentennial of the signing of the Declaration of Independence and Colorado's Sesquicentennial. The twin commemorations started in July 2025 and will end on December 31, 2026. Established by the Colorado General Assembly and Colorado Governor Jared Polis, History Colorado hosts the commission.

== Background ==
In 2022, SB22-011 was co-sponsored by Colorado state senators Rachel Zenzinger, Don Coram and Colorado state representatives Daneya Esgar, Marc Catlin. The bill was signed into law by Governor Jared Polis on May 26, 2022. The act creates the America 250 - Colorado 150 Commission in History Colorado to develop programs and plan for the official observance of the 250th anniversary of the founding of the United States and the 150th anniversary of Colorado statehood.

The commission is directed to promote historical activities, publication of historical documents, public ceremonies, education activities for Colorado youth, and other commemorative events. Events and plans will supported by comprehensive marketing and tourism campaigns. Commemorative events and activates will begin between July 1, 2025, and December 31, 2026.

The last commemoration similar to this one was held in 1976 for the United States Bicentennial and the Colorado Centennial.

== License plates ==
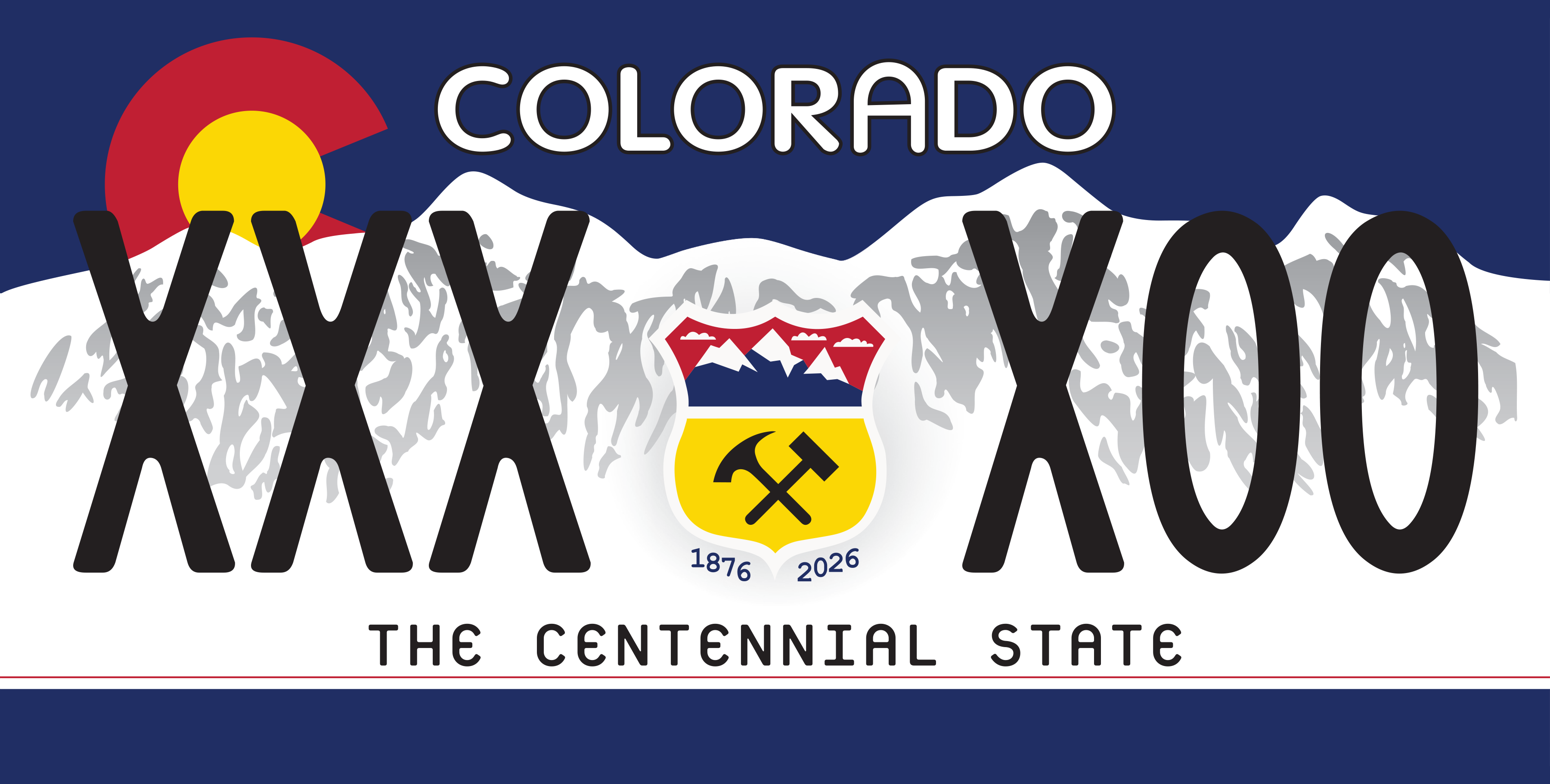
Colorado's Sesquicentennial Over 13 License Plate Winner. The plate is available from Aug 2023 thru July 2027. The Plate features Colorado's state colors, enclosed seal similar to Colorado's State Seal, Mountains, pickaxe and hammer.

Like the Centennial celebration, Colorado has issued specialty vehicle registration plates or vehicle license plates. For Colorado's Sesquicentennial commemoration, two designs were selected via contests. The competition was dubbed as "The Great License Plate Contest," which featured two divisions: Over 13 & Under 13 Coloradans voted in early 2023 on 10 design finalists for each division, resulting in 34,000 votes, in total. Governor Jared Polis announced the winners and their winning designs on March 1, 2023.

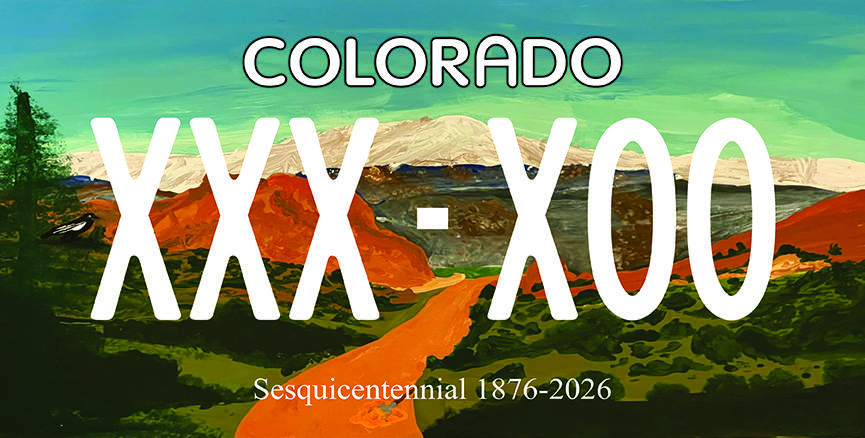
Colorado's Sesquicentennial Under 13 License Plate Winner. The plate is available from Aug 2023 thru July 2027. The plate is nicknamed "Pikes Peak or Bust for 150 Years." The plate features a view of Pikes Peak, a famous fourteener summit. The plate also features the state bird (lark bunting) and the state tree (blue spruce).

The two license plate designs are available from August 1, 2023 through July 2027.

== Inclusivity ==
The commission is required to identify, celebrate, and build knowledge around the history of Black communities, Indigenous communities, communities of color, women, and people with disabilities.
