= Bill Witt =

American politician

Member of the Oregon House of Representatives from the 7th district
- In office January 11, 1999 – January 13, 2003
- Preceded by: Chuck Carpenter
- Succeeded by: Mitch Greenlick

Personal details
- Born: December 12, 1951 (age 74) Youngstown, Ohio
- Party: Republican
- Education: Case Western Reserve University; University of Chicago Law School

William David Witt (born December 12, 1951) is an American politician. He served two terms in the Oregon House of Representatives from 1999 until 2003, and was twice the Republican nominee for Oregon's 1st congressional district.

== Early life ==
Witt was born in 1951 in Youngstown, Ohio. He received his B.A. from Case Western Reserve University in 1973 and his J.D. from the University of Chicago Law School in 1976. After moving to Oregon, Witt established Wittco Systems Incorporated in 1979. He and his wife, Gail, have two children. He is a Catholic.

== Political career ==
Witt helped establish the Oregon Christian Coalition, a Christian conservative organization, in 1992. He also worked on George H. W. Bush's re-election campaign and co-chaired the Oregon delegation to the Republican National Convention in both 1992 and 1996.

Witt entered electoral politics in 1994. He won the Republican primary for Oregon's 1st congressional district that year with 51% of the vote and took on one-term incumbent Elizabeth Furse in the general election. He was backed by the Oregon Citizens Alliance. While Furse was initially seen as an underdog, Witt's right-wing views and connection to the OCA made the race heavily competitive, and he lost by 0.12% in a year which saw Republicans gain 54 seats in the House, despite carrying every county in the district besides Multnomah. Witt sought a rematch against Furse in 1996, but lost by a wider margin, 52% to 45%.

In 1998, Witt ran for the Oregon House of Representatives. He defeated Chuck Carpenter, the first openly gay Republican elected to any state legislature in the country, by 46 votes in the Republican primary. His only opponent in the general election was Socialist candidate David W. Gillette, whom he defeated with 74% of the vote.

In 2000, Witt faced a tight reelection bid against Democrat Mitch Greenlick but prevailed by a 1.6% margin.

Witt did not run for reelection in 2002 and instead opted to run for the State Senate in the 17th district. He faced Democrat Charlie Ringo, a fellow state representative, and lost the general election by nearly 10 points. Greenlick succeeded him in the House.

== Political positions ==
Witt has been described as "ultra-conservative".

During his 1996 congressional campaign, Witt indicated he supported a balanced budget and reduced spending on Medicare. He opposed both partial-birth abortion and the Brady Bill but supported the Don't Ask, Don't Tell policy. He supported U.S. involvement during the Bosnian War as well as the North American Free Trade Agreement. Witt backed both the Personal Responsibility and Work Opportunity Act and the Family and Medical Leave Act of 1993.
