= Chuck Carpenter =

American politician

Member of the Oregon House of Representatives from the 7th district
- In office January 9, 1995 – January 11, 1999
- Preceded by: Ted Calouri
- Succeeded by: Bill Witt

Personal details
- Born: January 31, 1962 (age 64) Rochester, New York
- Party: Republican
- Education: University of Rochester

Charles Scott Carpenter (born January 31, 1962) is an American politician. He served in the Oregon House of Representatives from 1995 until 1999, and was the first openly gay Republican elected to any state legislature in the United States.

== Early life ==
Carpenter was born in Rochester, New York. He graduated from the University of Rochester with a Bachelor of Arts in Political Science in 1985 and then served in the United States Navy from 1985 until 1991.

== Political career ==
Carpenter was elected to the Oregon House in 1994, defeating Democrat Jeanne Atkins by less than a hundred votes to represent a district which included all Portland suburbs north of Sunset Highway, as well as Cedar Hills, Sauvie Island, and the rural areas in between. He was re-elected over Democrat Bob Shook by a wider margin in 1996, 58% to 42%.

In 1995, Carpenter said in an interview with the New York Times that he was often shunned by other members of the gay community due to his being a Republican: "I've been accepted in many ways better by my Republican colleagues, granted, they may disagree with me and not be too happy with the fact that I'm gay, but there's a willingness to work with me, whereas in the gay community, people looked at me for a while as the Jew working for the Nazis."

While serving in the Legislature, Carpenter sponsored HB 2734, which was a version of the Employment Non-Discrimination Act. The bill was denied a committee hearing, so Carpenter attempted to force a vote directly on the House floor. A compromise was later reached in which the bill would be revised and sent to a different committee. The revised version easily passed the House but failed by one vote in the Senate. The Republican leadership, angry over his sponsorship of that bill, attempted to force him out of the party, but Carpenter refused. He was challenged in the 1998 primary by "ultra-conservative" Bill Witt, a two-time congressional candidate who had the backing of anti-gay organizations. While Carpenter had the backing of Speaker Lynn Snodgrass, he ultimately lost by 46 votes.

Carpenter drew fire from gay rights activists, including from the Log Cabin Republicans, for endorsing Gordon Smith for U.S. Senate in 1996. Smith was seen as anti-gay, but Carpenter argued that he had changed his views, saying, "he was ignorant of gay and lesbian issues. I stepped in at a time that was very controversial and took an enormous amount of heat from the gay community because of my endorsement of him. I take a lot of pride in being able to change a very conservative man's opinion of gays and lesbians."

== Post-politics ==
Since 1999, Carpenter has been Executive Director of Manufactured Housing Communities of Oregon. He was president of the Oregon Small Business Coalition between 2012 and 2014.

== See also ==
- List of the first LGBT holders of political offices in the United States
