= Maxine Dexter =

American politician (born 1972)

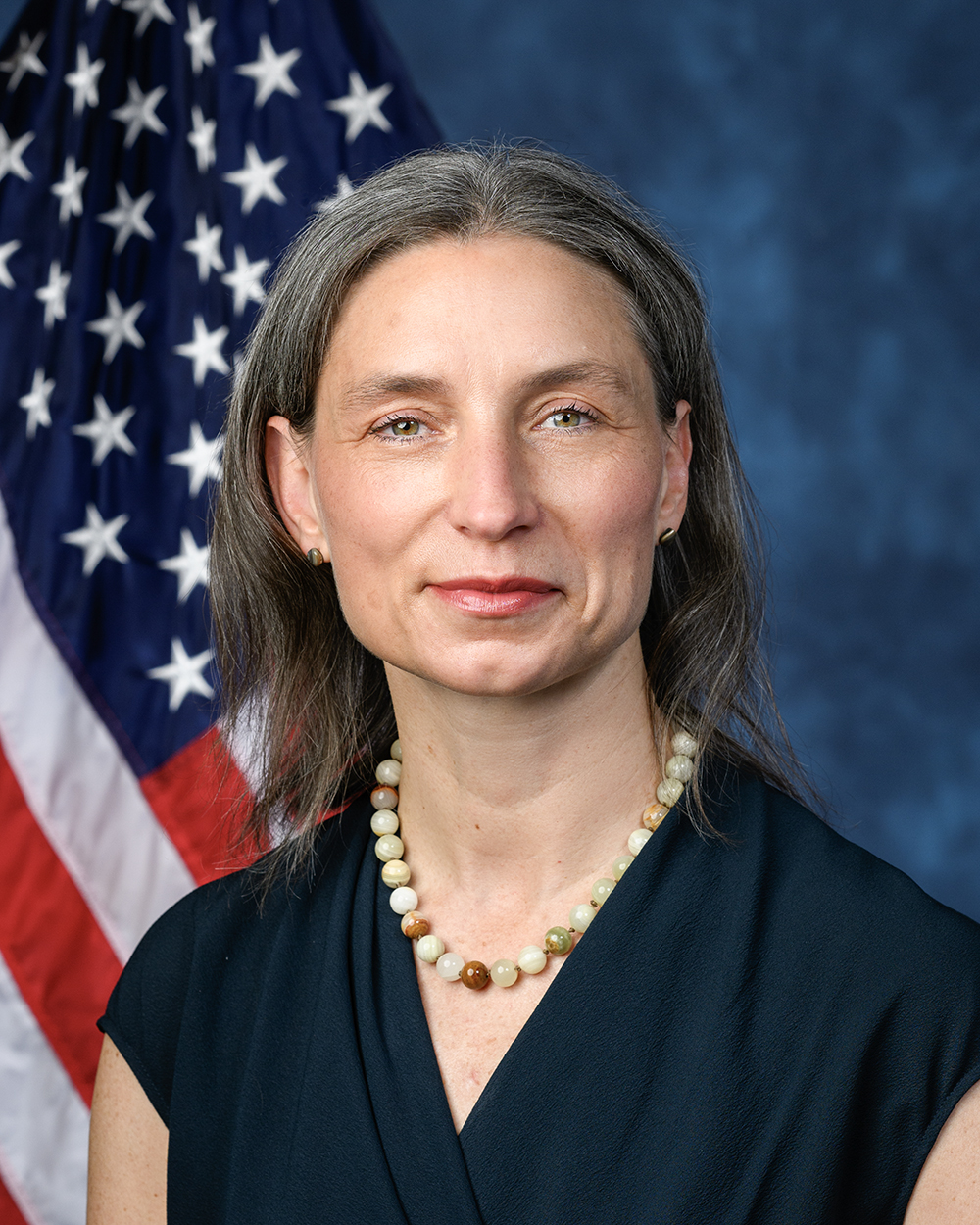
- Official portrait, 2024

Member of the U.S. House of Representatives from Oregon's 3rd district
- Incumbent
- Assumed office January 3, 2025
- Preceded by: Earl Blumenauer

Member of the Oregon House of Representatives from the 33rd district
- In office June 14, 2020 – August 30, 2024
- Preceded by: Mitch Greenlick
- Succeeded by: Shannon Jones Isadore

Personal details
- Born: Maxine Elizabeth Johnson; December 5, 1972 (age 53) Bothell, Washington, U.S.
- Party: Democratic
- Education: University of Washington (BA, MD)
- Website: House website Campaign website
- Dexter's voice Dexter before the 2020 Oregon House of Representatives election Recorded April 20, 2020

Maxine Elizabeth Dexter (née Johnson, born December 5, 1972) is an American physician and politician serving as the U.S. representative for Oregon's 3rd congressional district since 2025. The district includes most of Portland east of the Willamette River. A member of the Democratic Party, she previously represented the 33rd district of the Oregon House of Representatives from 2020 to 2024, which covers parts of Northwest Portland, as well as Cedar Mill, Oak Hills, and most of Bethany.

In May 2024, Dexter won the Democratic primary for Oregon's 3rd district after facing fellow Portland Democrat Susheela Jayapal. She was elected to the United States House of Representatives on November 5, 2024.

== Early life and medical career ==
Dexter grew up in Bothell, Washington, and graduated from Inglemoor High School. She received her bachelor's degree in political science and communication from the University of Washington, and her Doctor of Medicine from that university's School of Medicine.

Dexter served her medical residency in Aurora, Colorado, and moved to Portland with her husband in 2008. She works as a pulmonologist with Kaiser Permanente in Hillsboro. In 2023, it was reported that she would continue to work part-time at Kaiser Permanente as a pulmonologist and critical care medicine specialist during her congressional run.

== Oregon House of Representatives ==
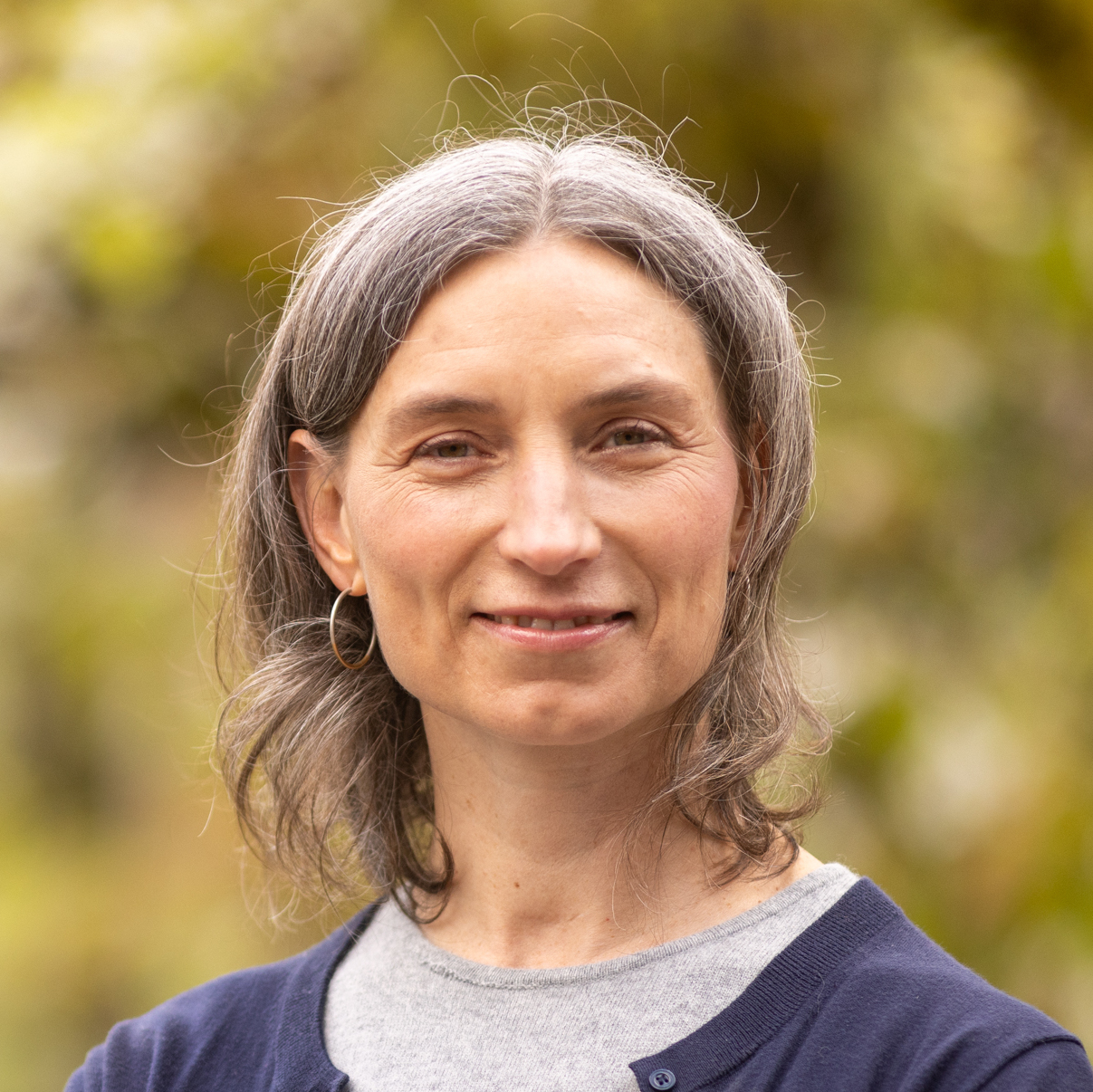
Dexter in 2024

Dexter ran to succeed Mitch Greenlick as representative for the 33rd district in the Oregon House of Representatives in the 2020 election. Dexter said she was inspired to run for office following the Brett Kavanaugh Supreme Court confirmation hearing, during which Christine Blasey Ford accused Kavanaugh of sexual assault, which he forcefully denied.

She won the Democratic primary to succeed Greenlick on May 17, 2020, with 40% of the vote, defeating three other candidates, including Christina Stephenson. Greenlick died on May 15, so Dexter was appointed to finish out his term a month later. During the COVID-19 pandemic, Dexter treated patients with the disease, and wrote a letter urging Oregon Governor Kate Brown to close Oregon schools in April 2020. She was reelected in the 2022 election. On July 31, 2024, Dexter announced she would resign from the legislature to focus on her campaign for Congress, effective August 30.

=== Tenure ===
As a representative, Dexter introduced a bill expanding access to the opioid antidote medication naloxone, allowing first responders to distribute the drug to members of the general public, and decriminalizing fentanyl test strips. The bill was signed into law on August 8, 2023.

Also in 2023, Dexter served as chair of the House Housing and Homelessness Committee in the legislature. She was credited with helping to pass a $200 million spending bill on housing and homelessness issues.

== United States House of Representatives ==
=== Elections ===
==== 2024 ====
On December 5, 2023, Dexter announced her candidacy for the Democratic nomination for Oregon's 3rd congressional district to succeed retiring Representative Earl Blumenauer. Dexter stated in an interview that she planned to run for Congress since she was 20.

In the primary, she faced opposition from former Multnomah County Commissioner Susheela Jayapal and Gresham City Councilor Eddy Morales. She was the top recipient of independent expenditure spending in the primary, with 314 Action spending about $2.2 million in total on independent expenditures in support of her campaign. She received endorsements from politicians including Dan Rayfield, who served as speaker of the Oregon House of Representatives from 2022 to 2024. She was also endorsed by The Oregonian and the Willamette Week. While not being officially endorsed by AIPAC, their super PAC put more than $2 million to help her campaign. Dexter ultimately won the Democratic primary, long the real contest in Oregon's most Democratic district.

On November 5, 2024, Dexter defeated Republican nominee Joanna Harbour in the general election.

=== Tenure ===
Dexter took office on January 3, 2025, alongside other members of the 119th United States Congress. She has indicated that passing legislation to expand access to healthcare and improve air quality are leading priorities for her in Congress.

In April 2025, Dexter traveled to El Salvador to try to help Kilmar Abrego Garcia, who had been deported by President Trump in a manner whose legality had been questioned by Dexter and many other public officials.

=== Committee assignments ===
For the 119th Congress:

- Committee on Natural Resources
  - Subcommittee on Federal Lands
  - Subcommittee on Oversight and Investigations (Ranking Member)
- Committee on Veterans' Affairs
  - Subcommittee on Disability Assistance and Memorial Affairs
  - Subcommittee on Health

=== Caucus membership ===
- Congressional Equality Caucus
- Congressional Progressive Caucus
- Labor Caucus
- Congressional Arts Caucus

== Political positions ==
Dexter supports the transition to a single-payer health care system. She also supports greater protections for employees, reducing greenhouse gas emissions, increased money for public housing, and stricter gun control. Dexter supports efforts to condition U.S. aid to Israel amid the ongoing Gaza war, cosponsoring the "Block the Bombs Act," which would block offensive weapons to Israel. She was one of 21 Democrats who have sponsored a resolution led by Representative Rashida Tlaib condemning Israel's actions in Gaza as a genocide and calling for sanctions against Israel.

== Personal life ==
Dexter lives in North Portland.

== Electoral history ==
2020 Oregon State Representative, 33rd district
Party	Candidate	Votes	%
Democratic	Maxine E Dexter	33,707	75.6
Republican	Dick Courter	10,796	24.2
Write-in		59	0.1
Total votes		44,562	100%

2022 Oregon State Representative, 33rd district
Party	Candidate	Votes	%
Democratic	Maxine E Dexter	26,154	84.8
Republican	Stan Baumhofer	4,651	15.1
Write-in		30	0.1
Total votes		30,835	100%

2024 US House of Representatives, Oregon's 3rd congressional district Democratic Primary
Party	Candidate	Votes	%
Democratic	Maxine Dexter	47,254	47.3
Democratic	Susheela Jayapal	32,793	32.8
Democratic	Eddy Morales	13,391	13.4
Democratic	Michael Jonas	2,359	2.4
Democratic	Nolan Bylenga	2,138	2.1
Democratic	Rachel Lydia Rand	856	0.9
Democratic	Ricardo Barajas	649	0.7
Write-in		430	0.4
Total votes		99,870	100.0

2024 US House of Representatives, Oregon's 3rd congressional district
Party	Candidate	Votes	%
Democratic	Maxine E Dexter	226,405	67.7
Republican	Joanna Harbour	84,344	25.2
Independent	David W Walker	10,245	3.1
Pacific Green	Joe Meyer	10,106	3.0
Constitution	David K Frosch	2,459	0.7
Write-in		810	0.2
Total votes		334,369	100%

U.S. House of Representatives
Preceded by Earl Blumenauer	Member of the U.S. House of Representatives from Oregon's 3rd congressional district 2025–present	Incumbent
U.S. order of precedence (ceremonial)
Preceded by Jeff Crank	United States representatives by seniority 374th	Succeeded by Troy Downing
