= Freedom 250 =

US executive planning team

Logo of Freedom 250

Freedom 250 LLC, officially the White House Task Force on Celebrating America's 250th Birthday (Task Force 250), is a public–private partnership created on January 29, 2025, by executive order of US president Donald Trump. Its purpose is "to plan, organize, and execute an extraordinary celebration of the 250th Anniversary of American Independence". Freedom 250 serves as the primary branding and funding arm of Task Force 250's execution of Trump's proposals. Members of the task force include the president, vice president, several executive department Secretaries, and the heads of several executive branch agencies.

The Task Force is separate from the congressional, non-partisan United States Semiquincentennial Commission, which uses the brand America250, created in 2016. In 2025, federal resources were diverted away from America250 and the Interior Department instructed its staff to make Freedom 250 the "primary branding" for all national events. It has received criticism by Democratic officials and historians for politicization, its fundraising practices, and its programming decisions.

== Organizational structure ==
While America250 is a stand-alone congressionally authorized nonprofit group, Freedom 250 "utilizes opaque corporate structures" and is "technically a limited liability company created by, and housed inside, the National Park Foundation". The Trump administration added two "stalwart" supporters in November 2025: Trump's top fundraiser Meredith O'Rourke and his former 2024 campaign manager Chris LaCivita.

Businessman and US undersecretary of state in the first Trump administration Keith J. Krach serves as the CEO of Freedom 250.

=== Members ===
The following members as of June 2026 are:

- Donald J. Trump: President of the United States (Chair)
- JD Vance: Vice President of the United States (Vice Chair)
- Marco Rubio: Secretary of State
- Scott Bessent: Secretary of the Treasury
- Pete Hegseth: Secretary of Defense
- Todd Blanche: Attorney General
- Doug Burgum: Secretary of the Interior
- Brooke Rollins: Secretary of Agriculture
- Howard Lutnick: Secretary of Commerce
- Lori Chavez-DeRemer: Secretary of Labor
- Robert F. Kennedy Jr: Secretary of Health and Human Services
- Scott Turner: Secretary of Housing and Urban Development
- Sean Duffy: Secretary of Transportation
- Chris Wright: Secretary of Energy
- Linda McMahon: Secretary of Education
- Doug Collins: Secretary of Veterans Affairs
- Kristi Noem: Secretary of Homeland Security
- Lee Zeldin: Administrator of the Environmental Protection Agency
- Russell Vought: Director of the Office of Management and Budget
- Stephen Miller: Deputy Chief of Staff for Policy
- James Blair: Deputy Chief of Staff for Legislative Affairs
- Dan Scavino: Deputy Chief of Staff for White House Operations
- Vince Haley: Domestic Policy Council Director/Lead Speechwriter for the President
- Karoline Leavitt: White House Communications Director
- Mike Needham: Deputy National Security Advisor
- Vince Haley: Domestic Policy Coordinator for Policy Integration
- Ross Worthington: Speechwriting Director and Lead Speechwriter for the Vice President

=== Funding ===
==== Donations ====
Freedom 250 offered access to Trump and other benefits to donors who give to the organization. While the task force offered to create "bespoke packages," there also were ones with set exchanges:

- $500,000–$1 million: Logo on website; reserved seating at events; group press release; rights to use Freedom 250 logo; general access to reception event
- $1 million–2.5 million: All of the above plus newsletter feature
- $2.5 million–$5 million: All of the above plus event speaking opportunity and photo with Trump at reception event; press release is a dedicated one (not group), access to reception is VIP (not general access)
- $5 million–$10 million: All of the above except logo placements and newsletter feature are prominent
- $10 million or more: All of the above except logo placements and newsletter feature are most prominent

US embassies promoted Freedom 250 and America250 to overseas donors to host lavish parties and events, with former diplomats and business executives describing an "aggressive" fundraising push that raised tens of millions of dollars. Freedom 250 spokeswoman Danielle Alvarez stated that the Freedom 250 name had been embraced across the administration, and suggested that embassies were using the name as shorthand for their own semiquincentennial initiatives not directly related to the group and that it did not receive foreign funding.

The following companies paid at least $500,000, but the list may not be comprehensive as donors could ask to remain anonymous, and since Freedom 250 was a limited liability company inside a 501(c)(3) organization, the organization was allowed to keep secret the amounts given.

- Boeing
- Chevron Corporation
- Deloitte
- Exiger
- ExxonMobil
- IndyCar
- January AI
- John Deere
- Lockheed Martin
- Mastercard
- The Mosaic Company
- Northrop Grumman
- Oracle Corporation
- Palantir
- Penske Automotive Group
- Phorm Energy
- RTX Corporation (formerly Ratheon Technologies Corporation)
- SAP
- Scotts Miracle-Gro Company
- UFC
- United Airlines
- UnitedHealth Group

In addition to donors or sponsors, who gave $500,000–$10 million, there also were "partners" which was a tier without a publicized donation amount; they included:

- 51 Steps to Freedom, civic education nonprofit created by H.H. Leonards and Tracy Halliday
- AI Expo, hosted by Special Competitive Studies Project
- America First Policy Institute
- America's Roundtable, a weekly talk radio show owned by International Leaders Summit/Summit Leaders USA
- American Cornerstone Institute
- American Gem Trade Association, founded in 1981 with over 1,200 current members
- American Heritage Girls
- American Journey Experience, part of Glenn Beck's Mercury One nonprofit
- American Principles Project
- American Veterans Center
- Americans for Prosperity
- Ashbrook Center, academic civic nonprofit based at Ashland University and named after John M. Ashbrook
- Blockchain Association, lobbying group led by Summer Mersinger
- Civics Education Coalition, initiative created in September 2025 as a collaboration between the US Department of Education, the America First Policy Institute, and others
- Colonial Flag, a flag manufacturer
- Concordia Summit
- Eden Arts & Immersive Media Festival, a cultural initiative founded for the 250th anniversary events for the concert series, immersive storytelling, and holograms
- Hall of Giants, a nonprofit that hopes to create a "hall of fame" and currently creates theme-park immersive rides
- Hillsdale College
- Imagine Museum, glass museum founded by Patricia Duggan
- JCDecaux
- Krach Institute for Tech Diplomacy at Purdue
- Military Women's Memorial
- Moms for America, conservative education advocacy group
- Moms for Liberty
- Museum of the Bible
- National Confectioners Association
- National Religious Broadcasters
- National Vet Court Alliance Inc., a nonprofit to expand veteran court dockets for veterans facing criminal charges
- Portraits of Hope
- Practicing Musician, an online music lesson platform
- PragerU
- Pray.com
- PrimeTime Acquisitions
- Purdue University College of Engineering
- Ronald Reagan Presidential Foundation & Institute, a nonprofit founded by Ronald Reagan in 1985 to build his presidential library (originally) and to preserve his legacy (now)
- S'mores and Stripes podcast launched in June 2025 by William Andrew Thompson and the Under God Project, to promote microschools
- Sun Valley Policy Forum, a nonprofit that hosts national symposia on limited government and free markets
- The Great American Art Competition, founded in 2025 by abstract painter Adam M. Thompson, the competition elevates traditional realism
- Union League of Philadelphia
- United States Navy Memorial
- U.S. 250 Tour, a traveling festival for the 250th anniversary
- Wallbuilders
- Wreaths Across America

==== Diverted funding and donation controversy ====
By the end of 2025, $10 million worth of funding towards America250 was diverted to Freedom 250's "Freedom Trucks". In early 2026, Representative Bonnie Watson Coleman stated that America250 had only received $25 million of its congressionally appropriated $150 million, and was concerned the remainder would be reallocated to the Trump-aligned Freedom 250.

In February 2026, Democratic senators launched a probe into Freedom 250's funding practices over its transparency and potential conflicts of interest. During a February congressional hearing, Democratic Representative Jared Huffman accused the Trump administration of using Freedom 250 to "hijack the country's 250th anniversary and sell access, hide his donors and rewrite history" and that Republicans had "let him clean house and put loyalists on the board of the National Park Foundation, open the door to foreign, dark money donors to buy influence with zero oversight". Representative Maxine Dexter expressed concerns that the organization was using public money and mixing it with private donations, and that the structure of the organization made it difficult to trace where the money came from. The Interior Department has stated that the U.S. Semi-quincentennial Commission receives money through an interagency agreement with the National Park Service but did not respond to questions regarding the distribution of federal money to America250. NOTUS reported that as of April 29, 2026, Freedom 250 had received $68.3 million from the Department of the Interior.

== Proposals ==
As announced in his campaign platform Agenda 47, proposals include a "Great American State Fair" to be held in the Iowa State Fairgrounds, featuring pavilions from all fifty states, "Patriot Games" for high-school athletes, public monuments such as a National Garden of American Heroes, and other year-long celebrations and projects across the country. On January 29, 2025, President Trump signed Executive Order 14189, entitled "Celebrating America's 250th Birthday".

On December 17, 2025, Trump unveiled more detailed plans for the "Patriot Games," which will consist of "one young man and one young woman from each state and territory." The proposal has incited attention from social media users and various political figures for its purported similarities with the competition in the post-apocalyptic Hunger Games media franchise.

Other proposals include the Rededicate 250 prayer gathering, a Memorial Day event, a July 4 celebration, and the Indy car race Freedom 250 Grand Prix in the streets of Washington, D.C. and the National Mall.

The Interior Department has declared Freedom 250 the "primary branding" for all official celebrations, stating in internal documents that "America250 branding will still appear in co-branded events" but "Freedom 250 should be the lead identity in most cases." Employees were encouraged to add Freedom 250 to their email signatures.

== Artist cancellations ==
On May 27, 2026, Freedom 250 announced a series of nine concerts to be performed on the National Mall as part of the Great American State Fair event. That same day, several of the announced artists claimed that they were not informed the event was planned by the Trump administration and that they would not be performing. A few days later, a majority of the acts in the original announcement had dropped out, including Young MC, Morris Day and the Time, Commodores, Martina McBride, and Bret Michaels. Fab Morvan, one of the original performers in Milli Vanilli, originally confirmed his attendance, but cancelled days later. By the end of May, only one of the announced acts, Vanilla Ice, had committed to performing the event.

On June 4, 2026, Trump announced that the concert series would be cancelled and replaced with one rally featuring a speech he will give himself and performances by singers Lee Greenwood and Christopher Macchio.

On June 26, 2026, Vanilla Ice's scheduled performance at Great American State Fair would be cancelled due to bad weather. In addition C+C Music Factory, who were originally billed as performing together with Young MC before Young MC withdrew from the event, were now no longer billed to perform at the fair either. However, despite the group being billed for the Great American State Fair, C+C Music Factory co-founder Robert Clivillés previously made clear that he had no intention of performing at the fair, with Freedom Williams being the only member of C+C Music Factory who was willing to perform.

On July 1, 2026, Chris Tomlin's performance at the United States Semiquincentennial event in Washington, D.C. was met with widespread ridicule due to a lack of fans and a mostly-empty event established by the White House Task Force on Celebrating America's 250th Birthday.

Flo Rida did perform, as the only one left from the original lineup. On the same day, he publicly endorsed Democratic congressional candidate Bernard Taylor for Florida's 21st congressional district.

== Criticism ==
The New York Times described events held by Trump's Freedom 250 as having "lacked connection to American history", and were described as "tailored to Mr. Trump's political agenda and his penchant for spectacle, personal branding and legacy". The Associated Press described it as focused on "splashy events" compared to America250's focus on civic engagement and history. The Times described the organization as taking on a "Trumpian flare" and overshadowing years of planning work done by America250.

Trump's formation of Task Force 250 was criticized by Democrats and some historians as an attempt to politicize the celebrations, with conservative author and political scientist John J. Pitney describing them as "an opportunity for people to curry Trump's favor" through donations. John Dichtl, president of the American Association for State and Local History criticized Task Force 250's decision to host a UFC fight on the White House lawn, writing "What does a (UFC) fight have to do with America's greatness?" A June 21 letter by Democrats on the bipartisan America250 commission questioned its relationship to the Trump-led Task Force 250 and its events.

The task force has received criticism from historians for its partnership with PragerU and its "Founders Museum" exhibit for blurring history with AI-generated fiction and having historical characters repeat the phrase "facts don't care about your feelings" popularized by conservative commentator Ben Shapiro. The White House said it has sent letters to state governors and ambassadors to display its exhibit in capitals, schools, and embassies. Freedom 250's "Freedom Trucks" exhibit received criticism for being designed by conservative Hillsdale College and PragerU and prominently featuring quotes by Trump and a video he filmed inside the Oval Office.

== See also ==
- United States Semiquincentennial Commission
- America First Policy Institute
