= Directo USA =

US television program

- Screen logo
- Genre: News magazine
- Presented by: Juan Carlos Lopez
- Country of origin: United States
- Original language: Spanish

Production
- Production locations: Washington, D.C.
- Running time: One hour

Original release
- Network: CNN en Español
- Release: November 22, 2010

Directo USA is a daily news program on CNN en Español hosted by Juan Carlos Lopez. Directo USA covers the hottest events in the United States with in-depth interviews and analysis of how they affect the Americas.

== History ==
The television show was first broadcast on November 22, 2010 as part of a makeover for the CNN en Español network. The show was one of three full-hour format news magazines added to the prime-time news schedule of the network, hosted by Juan Carlos Lopez. As of 2013 the show also featured a weekly segment entitled Directo a la Tecnología, co-hosted by Silvina Moschini. Other segments on the show include the "Immigration" segment that focuses on immigration issues, the "Census" segment that focuses on economic and other social issues that affect viewers, the "Latinos in America" segment that focuses on the Latino identity in America, and the "Success" segment that focuses on how Hispanics are positively impacting the US.

== Interviews ==
The television show interviews individuals ranging from people at the center of current events to business leaders and celebrities. For example, in December 2010 Secretary General of the Organization of American States José Miguel Insulza appeared, discussing how isolationist laws in individual Latin American nations can negatively affect economic cooperation between nations. The show also interviewed Ricardo Martinelli, the President of Panama.

In January 2011 Lopez interviewed Joaquim de Almeida for the show, covering his film resume and career decisions. In October 2011 US Secretary of State Hillary Clinton was interviewed. She trumpeted the importance of free trade agreements between the US and Latin American nations, spoke about domestic immigration laws in the US, and discussed the government policies of Mexico and other nations. In May 2013 the show aired an exclusive interview with Pedro Castro and Onil Castro, brothers of Ariel Catro, kidnapper in the 2013 Cleveland missing trio case.
