= KMGI =

KMGI may refer to:

- KMGI (FM), a radio station (102.5 FM) licensed to Pocatello, Idaho, United States
- KMGi Group, a holding company for Internet technology related firms
