= Unicorn Hunters =

American reality TV series

- Genre: Reality
- Judges: Steve Wozniak; Lance Bass; Moe Vela; Silvina Moschini; Alex Konanykhin; Scott Livingston; Rosa Rios
- Country of origin: United States
- Original language: English
- No. of seasons: 2
- No. of episodes: 16

Production
- Executive producer: Craig Plestis

Original release
- Release: May 10, 2021

Unicorn Hunters is a reality television series that debuted in 2021 on Amazon Prime.

== Series overview ==
The series features a group of investors called the “Circle of Money” and groups of entrepreneurs that pitch their businesses to the group in search of investment funds. The viewing audience also has the ability to invest in the same companies as the investors on the show. Season one consisted of sixteen episodes. The Washington Post has described the series as “the only show that can make you rich”.

=== Circle of Money ===
In the shows first season, the members of the Circle of Money included Steve Wozniak, Lance Bass, Moe Vela, Silvina Moschini, Alex Konanykhin, Scott Livingston, and Rosa Rios.

== Production ==
The show was produced by Craig Plestis and premiered on May 10, 2021 on Amazon Prime.

Unicorn Hunters also eventually made a home on the online streaming platform Binge Networks.

As of September 2024, the show was seeking entrepreneurs to be featured on the second season.

== Unicoin ==
In 2022, the founders of the company behind the show developed a cryptocurrency called “Unicoin”. The currency was developed for investors to fund new “high growth” companies according to co-founder Silvina Moschini.

Fellow co-founder Konanykhin has also stated that the “coin was backed by venture capital investments in scaleups”. Companies backing unicoin have included the healthcare company Mymee. By May 2022 Unicoin was invested in five different companies, with $25 million unicoins sold. Owners of unicoin have a stake in the cryptocurrency, but not the companies that the Unicorn Hunters themselves have stakes within.

In December 2024, the U.S. Securities and Exchange Commission sent Unicoin a Wells Notice to inform Unicoin of the SEC's intent to file a lawsuit for "violations related to fraud, deceptive practices, and the offering and sale of unregistered securities".

== See also ==
- Dragons' Den
- Shark Tank
