= WNS =

WNS, or wns, is an acronym for:

- WADP Numbering System, a worldwide reference system for postal stamps
- West Nairobi School, a school in Kenya
- Westside Neighborhood School, Los Angeles
- White nose syndrome, a poorly understood disease of bats
- Windows Notification Service, a service developed by Microsoft for the Microsoft Windows and Microsoft Windows Mobile platforms
- WNS Global Services, a business process outsourcing company
- WNS, the IATA code for Nawabshah Airport, Sindh, Pakistan
- WNS, the National Rail code for Winnersh railway station, Berkshire, UK
- WNS, the station identifier for the US Storm Prediction Center
- World Netball Series
