= Alex Konanykhin =

Entrepreneur and former banker

- Александр Конаныхин
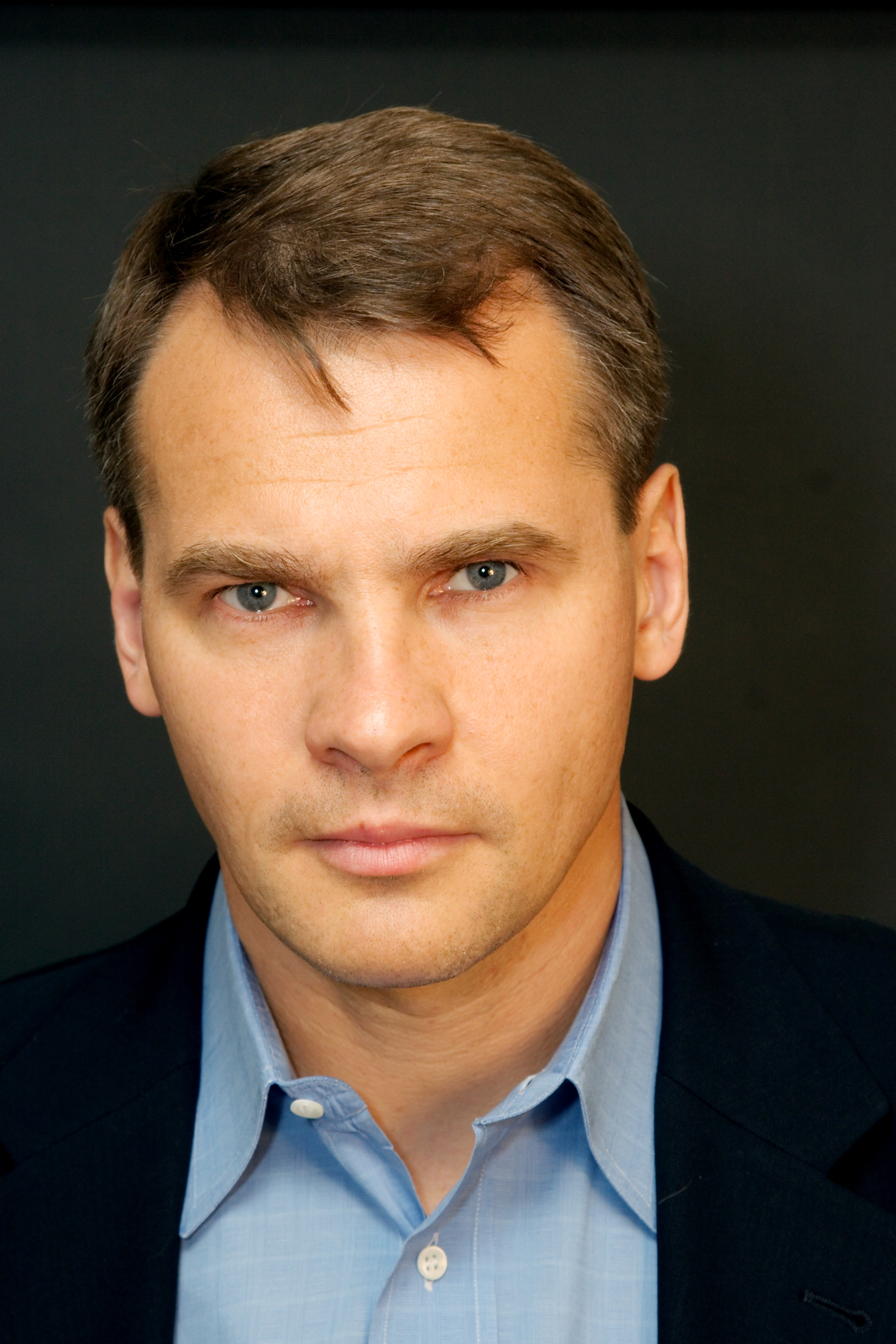
- Konanykhin in 2006
- Born: September 25, 1966 (age 60); Ostashkov, USSR
- Citizenship: Russia, Italy, and Argentina
- Occupations: KMGi, TransparentBusiness
- Known for: Entrepreneur, former banker
- Awards: 2004 New York Businessman of the Year, Republican National Committee; 2011 WW IT Visionary Award from CIO Magazine

Alex Konanykhin (born Alexander Pavlovich Konanykhin (Russian: Александр Павлович Конаныхин; September 25, 1966) is an entrepreneur and former banker. He started his career by founding a private bank in Russia towards the end of communist rule. Konanykhin is sometimes spelled as Konanykhine.

Konanykhin and his wife left Russia in 1992, and seven years later were granted political asylum in the United States. The asylum grants were reversed in 2004, but reinstated in 2007. He spent his business career largely in the United States, being a citizen of Italy, Russia, and Argentina. He has founded companies including KMGi Group and TransparentBusiness.

== Early life ==
Konanykhin studied at the Department of Space Research at the Moscow Institute of Physics and Technology to pursue a career in engineering. In 1986, he was expelled from MIPT for running a small business during his summer vacation. After his expulsion, he took advantage of the loosening business climate during Mikhail Gorbachev's economic reforms (perestroika). Within a few years, he became the head of a $30 million construction enterprise.

== Career in Russia ==
In 1991, Konanykhin was the founder, co-owner, and President of the Russian Exchange Bank, which became the first institution to receive a currency-trading license from the Yeltsin government. In 1992, he was one of the delegates to accompany Yeltsin to Washington, D.C., where they met with President George H. W. Bush, and afterwards, in Canada with Prime Minister Brian Mulroney. Richard Sakwa named him the wealthiest person in Russia at that time, with an estimated $300 million in net worth. He had developed about 100 different companies within Russia by this time, when he was twenty-five years old.

In 1992 he was kidnapped while on a business trip to Budapest, during which time his business assets in Russia were seized. This account is according to Alex himself. Russian sources have a different account of events, based on a US court case. Konanykhin claims he fled to New York where he delivered protest letters to senior Moscow officials and members of the press warning of the looming "mafiocracy". This prompted an investigation by the Moscow-based military prosecutor's office, and Konanykhin soon found himself under investigation. The prosecutor, Alexander Volevodz (Волеводз), now charged Konanykhin with illegally wiring $8.1 million from the Russian Exchange Bank to overseas accounts, and many other crimes, and demanded his extradition to Russia. All charges were later dropped.

As hearings in American federal court would later show, during this time the FBI had opened a division in Moscow; because American prosecutors and FBI officials were anxious to develop a relationship with Russian law enforcement officials, they had agreed to assist Volevodz in his request for Konanykhin's deportation. However, as Russia and the United States do not have an extradition treaty, Justice Department officials agreed to try to deport him for violating immigration laws under a minor visa violation. The allegation was later proven false and dismissed during Konanykhin's first grant of asylum in 1999.

== First immigration trial ==
On June 27, 1996, Immigration and Naturalization Service (INS) agents along with Russian federal prosecutors arrested Konanykhin and his wife, Elena Gratcheva, at their Watergate apartment in Washington, D.C. The couple was taken to Arlington County, and charged in federal immigration court with violating the conditions of their temporary U.S. visas. Between July 19 and August 2, 1996, hearings were held by Judge John M. Bryant to determine if, as Konanykhin claimed, his deportation was being masterminded by Russian prosecutor Volevodz for political reasons, and if Konanykhin's life and/or freedom were in danger. The trial touched upon issues as to whether the secret police had taken over the Russian banking industry, and also if the United States government had been fooled into going after Konanykhin. (Note: Yuri Shvets allegedly provided assistance during this 1996 INS investigation.)

In court Konanykhin testified he was being targeted by Volevodz and the Russian government because of his anti-corruption campaign, and his lawyers argued that he had transferred money to private accounts to prevent it from being stolen. Appearing as witnesses at the trial were FBI agents who testified that the Russian mafia had previously taken out a contract on Konanykhin's life. Also appearing were former INS prosecutor, Antoinette Rizzi, who had previously been in charge of the government's case against Konanykhin, and former KGB agent Yuri Shvets. Both Rizzi and Shvets testified that they had serious doubts about the charges filed against Konanykhin by Volevodz and the American government.

On August 26, 1997, in federal court in Arlington County, a settlement agreement was reached between Konanykhin, who had spent more than 13 months in INS custody, although Gratcheva had been released on supervision, and the District Director of the Arlington INS District Office, and endorsed by District Judge T. S. Ellis III. Judge Ellis stated that he found the testimonies of Yuri Shvets and Antoinette Rizzi in Konanykhin's immigration case "credible and somewhat disturbing". ordered the INS to pay $100,000 of Konanykhin's legal fees to pro bono counsel at Arent Fox Kintner Plotkin & Kahn. The settlement also ordered Assistant U.S. Attorney Robert Spencer to confirm within 30 days that there would be an internal probe by the Department of Justice into the conduct of INS lawyers at the hearing.

== Libel lawsuits and political asylum ==
In a lawsuit filed in February 1997 with the Arlington County Circuit Court, Konanykhin alleged defamation against the daily Russian newspaper Izvestia which had reported that Konanykhin was involved in various criminal acts. The suit claimed that the information was erroneous and published with "reckless disregard for its truth or actual malice." An Arlington County Circuit Court jury recommended Konanykhin be awarded $33.5 million. Soon thereafter the same court awarded him an additional $3 million in a libel case against the Russian financial journal Kommersant. According to The Sunday Times, in 2010 the amount remained the largest amount ever awarded to an individual in a libel suit.

On February 23, 1999, Judge Bryant granted political asylum to Konanykhin and Gratcheva, saying the former banker faced persecution and possible death if returned to Russia to face embezzlement charges. In his decision, Bryant wrote that testimony from several experts had convinced him that Konanykhin was being targeted for prosecution for political reasons.

Temporarily freed from his trials with the Russian and American governments, Konanykhin and Gratcheva went on to develop a $100 million Internet startup in New York City called KMGi, among other businesses. On November 20, 2003, however, the Board of Immigration Appeals revoked Konanykhin's political asylum and ordered him returned to Russia. The ruling came less than a month (October 25, 2003) after the arrest of Mikhail Khodorkovsky, Konanykhin's former banking rival in Russia and business partner during his exile. Konanykhin had served as vice president for the international development of Khodorkovsky's bank, Menatep.

== Second immigration trial ==
Konanykhin and Gratcheva fled to the Canada–United States border to evade immigration authorities. There, on December 18, 2003, they were arrested by several Department of Homeland Security agents at the Peace Bridge. Konanykhin and Gratcheva were saved from deportation at the last minute by a series of emergency hearings in Federal Court. On January 26, 2004, Judge Ellis delivered his ruling, which found the arrest unlawful, and allowed the couple to stay in the United States temporarily until appeals in their immigration case were exhausted.

For the second time the Department of Justice was ordered to pay compensation to Konanykhin for unlawful arrest. In 2005, all charges against him in Russia were dropped.

On September 18, 2007, in a federal courtroom in Alexandria, Virginia, Konanykhin was granted asylum for the second time.

== Career in America ==
He and his first wife established the Internet firms KMGi (an advertising agency), Publicity Guaranteed (a public relations firm), and The Syndicated News, an online marketplace. In 2004, Konanykhin was named "New York Businessman of the Year" by the Republican National Committee.

His firm, KMGi established a subsidiary, WikiExperts.us, a business centered around creating Wikipedia articles for companies. Paid editing of Wikipedia has sparked considerable debate due to conflicts of interest. Konanykhin has called for a boycott of Wikipedia fundraising campaigns, "We believe that boycotting fundraising efforts of Wikipedia might compel it to raise billions via advertising and develop content of significantly better quality." His company WikiExperts.us, which offers editing services on Wikipedia, was banned from editing on the online encyclopedia on October 17, 2013.

In 2011 Konanykhin was named the winner of the WW IT Visionary Award by CIO Magazine (in Spanish: WW IT Visionary 2011 de CIO America Latina). In 2011 Konanykhin's firm KMGi founded TransparentBusiness, which allows employers or clients to monitor the activity of those working for them on computers. As of 2017 the software was in use in 98 countries. In 2018, Konanykhin began working with legislators in states including Rhode Island in order to introduce bills such as H-7788 and S-2660 to try to mandate government contractors to verify the hours they billed to the government. He also worked with the New Jersey State Assembly on draft bill NJ A3989, in addition with other states such as Missouri, Illinois, and Minnesota, with twenty-two states having proposed bills for billing verification as of February 2019. In 2018 the company opened a $10 million 506(c) offering for a ten percent stake, following a $1.5 million early investment round. In 2019 Konanykhin appeared on the City & State "New York Tech Power 50" list.

== Unicorn Hunters ==
In 2021 Konanykhin became one of seven entrepreneurs to form the "Circle of Money" on the streaming television series Unicorn Hunters. The television panel also includes Steve Wozniak, Lance Bass, Rosa Gumataotao Rios, Moises Vela, Scott Livingston, and Silvina Moschini. According to Real Screen the show intends to, "show mixes entertainment with the potential for consumers to back select pre-IPO investment opportunities, thereby democratizing wealth creation." The show streamed on Amazon Prime, in addition to other platforms. While the seven investors represented on the panel choose to invest or not as prospective companies pitch their businesses, viewers of the show are also able to invest their own funds in the businesses featured.

=== Unicoin ===
The company behind the television show released the cryptocurrency unicoin in February 2022. According to fellow founder Steve Wozniak, the coin is tied to the financial results of the companies that the Unicorn Hunters and the show’s viewers have invested in, making it an asset backed cryptocurrency. When investing with unicoin, investors won’t own a stake in the companies themselves, but unicoin will hold the stake, allowing for it to increase in value with the value of the investment. Soon after its founding it became considered a securities token by the SEC. $25 million in unicoins had been sold by May 2022. On May 20, 2025, the SEC sued Konanykhin and two others for making misleading statements to Unicoin’s investors on the value of investments made by Unicoin in physical assets; in August of 2025, Unicoin issued a filing in court to have the charges dismissed as they claimed they mischaracterized their work.

== Bounty on Putin's head ==
On March 1, 2022, shortly after the 2022 Russian invasion of Ukraine, Konanykhin announced on social media that he was offering a $1 million bounty for the arrest of Vladimir Putin with the text "Wanted: Dead or Alive. Vladimir Putin for mass murder". Despite the wording of his online poster, Konanykhin subsequently re-iterated that he was not advocating assassination, but admitted that he would celebrate Putin's death.

== Published works ==
- Defiance: How to Succeed in Business Despite Being Hounded by the FBI, the KGB, the INS, the Department of Homeland Security, the Department of Justice, Interpol, and Mafia Hitmen Renaissance Publishing, 2006; ISBN 978-0-9727377-0-8

== Personal life ==
Brian Haig's book, The Hunted (ISBN 0-446-19559-6), is a novel based on the life of Alex Konanykhin and Elena Gratcheva. The book is dedicated to the late Gratcheva.
