= Intuic =

Social media company

- Company type: Public Relations
- Founded: 2002
- Founder: Silvina Moschini
- Headquarters: United States

Intuic is a social media company founded by entrepreneur and media contributor Silvina Moschini in 2003, that focuses on brand visibility.

== Company history ==
The company advises companies and individuals as to how to use social media outlets and how to avoid the negative ramifications that can arise from the misuse or ignoring of social media. The company was founded after Moschini relocated from Latin America to the United States. Moschini first worked as a waitress before working in public relations positions with Compaq and Grupo Santander, then vice president of corporate communications for Visa International. The company was founded in 2002.

Before the rise of social media, the company began working with corporations on their public websites to deal with the pre- and post-sale parts of e-commerce. After establishing itself in the United States, Intuic began to shift its focus to also include Latin American companies, including those from Moschini's native Argentina. Intuic has advised corporate clients on their social media strategies including Twitter, Google, MasterCard, Microsoft, Cisco, Computer Associates, Millicom, Hewlett Packard, and BMW.
