= Garden in Transit =

Public art exhibit on New York City taxicabs

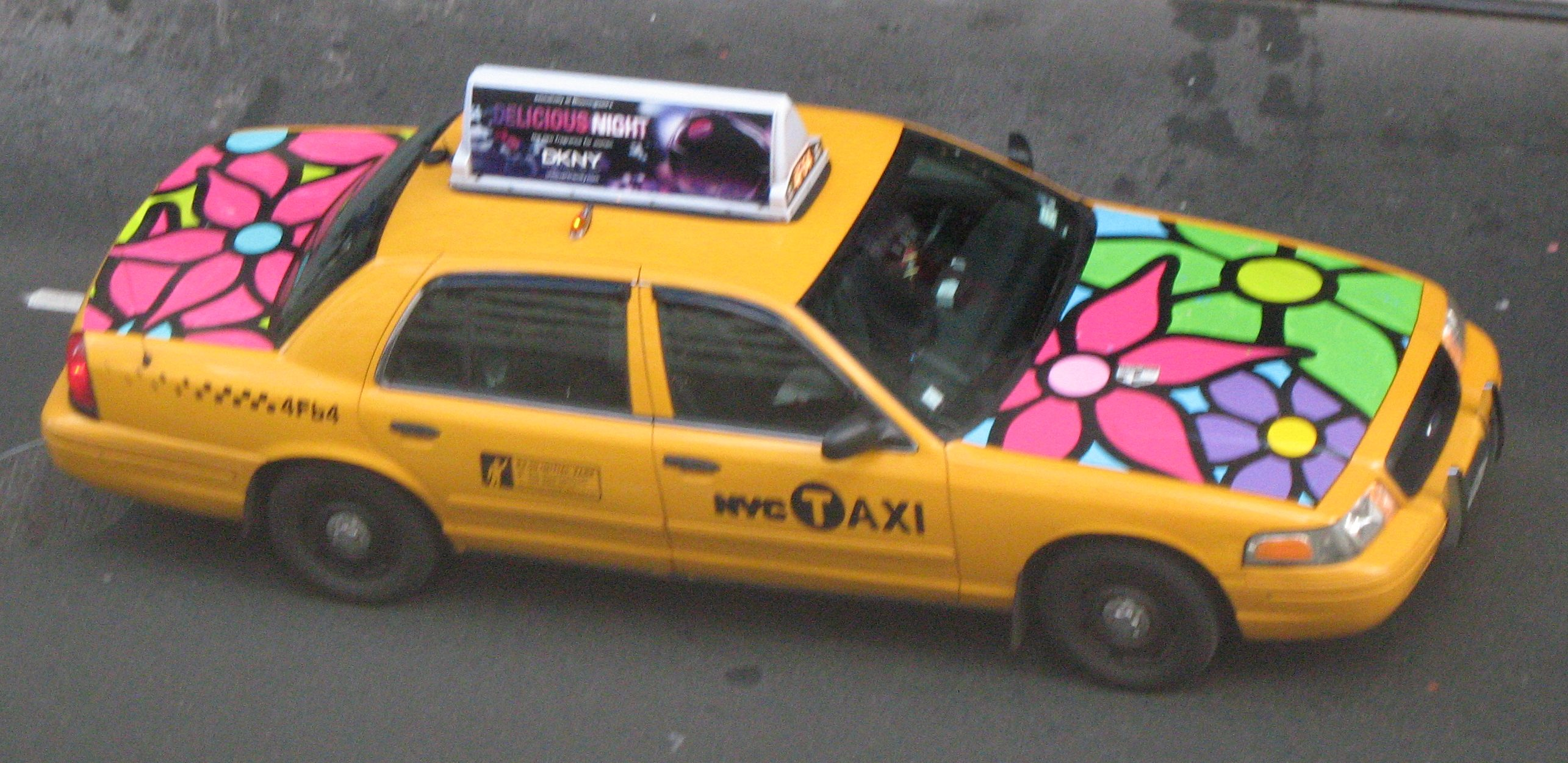

Garden in Transit was a public art exhibit displayed on New York City taxicabs between September 2007 and December 2007. Adhesive, weatherproof paintings of flowers painted by children in schools and hospitals were applied to the exteriors of New York City taxicabs. The paintings were mostly made by New York City children, with some being made by children in New Jersey, Philadelphia, Atlanta, Cleveland, and Los Angeles. The project was organized by Ed Massey and his brother Bernie .

The 'Flower Taxis' were part of a series of public art projects that the Masseys have done with children in their Portraits of Hope project since its founding in 1995. Each of the projects has a corporate sponsor. Its other large-scale projects include:

- The Tower of Hope in Sweden in 2000
- Soaring Dreams Airship – a blimp in 2005
- Soaring Dreams – NASCAR cars in 2006
- Chelsea Piers Project at Chelsea Piers
- Control Tower Paneling the Long Beach Airport Control Tower in 2007
