= Binge Networks =

Video streaming service

Binge Networks is a subscription-based video streaming service. It was founded by Bonnie Bruderer, who is its CEO.

== Background ==
Binge Networks headquarters is located in Florida and provides distribution and licensing services for producers, filmmakers, and content creators. It has built into over 100 smart TV networks allowing content creators to syndicate and monetize. Some of Binge's streaming partners are Apple, Roku, and Amazon apps.

== Selected Programming ==
- Unicorn Hunters
- DreamOWay (hosted by Selena Gomez), TBA
- Better Than Gossip: Ageless Advice for Timeless Women
- The Girlfriend Hour!
- Anyone But Me
- Daily Flash Network
- Mr. Biz Network
- Homeless Sam & Sally
- Iron Dragon TV
- Cyber Life
- Alaska Outdoors Magazine
- Chef Eric’s Culinary Classroom
- United Fight Alliance
- Trace Sport Stars
- Let’s Go See
- Tokens, stayed on Binge for the first season and was later sold to Urbanflix TV
- ChimneySwift11
