= KMGi Group =

Advertising company

KMGi
- Type: Advertising agency
- Industry: Internet advertising
- Founded: 1997
- Founder: Alex Konanykhin
- Headquarters: New York City
- Key people: Alex Konanykhin; Silvina Moschini; Nikolai Mentchokov; Elena Gratcheva
- Services: Internet commercials, web presentations, website design, commercial software
- Subsidiaries: Publicity Guaranteed; WikiExperts.us; TransparentBusiness

KMGi Group is an online advertising Internet company that includes WikiExperts.

== History ==
Founded in 1997 in New York City by Alex Konanykhin, Nikolai Mentchokov, and Elena Gratcheva as an advertising agency. The company later shifted focus to work primarily on website design. The company name is based on the initials of the founders' last names. The company's first headquarters were located in the Empire State Building. At that time, many of the company's employees were Russian. The company began with 35 employees based in one physical location, but has since moved to the use of a virtual office, using employees from different countries instead of just one location.

== Webmercials ==
In 1998, KMGi introduced the use of Macromedia’s Flash Technology for online advertising. Alex Mentchoukov, the agency's chief creative officer, created a way of using vector-based graphics for Web advertisements without using as much bandwidth as pixel-based graphics. From this work, KMGi became one of the first companies to create animated, television-style "webmercials" for the Internet. In August 2000, KMGi partnered with Unicast to move from using the interstitial format for its commercials to the superstitial format, which reduced the slowdown effect of browser downloads. In 2002 the KMGi website then became the first to be carried entirely in Flash Lingo. KMGi's webmercial and other services clients have included Volvo, Pfizer, DuPont, Best Western, Verizon, and Macromedia. In addition, the agency has produced advertisements for companies including Coca-Cola, Lexus, and the New York Post.

== Software and services ==
In 2000, the company began selling retail software and by 2004, KMGi had $1.4 million in sales of software. Part of the company's marketing plan included the distribution of free anti-spam software to consumers who watched a 30-second commercial. KMGi also created WebPresentations, a producer of online product demonstrations. In 2004 KMGi released SeePassword, a program that allowed users to recover hidden or lost passwords from Internet Explorer. In 2005, KMGi formed a subsidiary called Publicity Guaranteed, public relations firm. In 2010, KMGi then formed a subsidiary called WikiExperts, which says that it creates and repairs English Wikipedia articles for companies, or advises them on how to create articles themselves. At the time of WikiExperts' creation, Konanykhin suggested that Wikipedia should use advertising to generate more revenue and pay "qualified experts" to improve its content.

In 2011 KMGi released TransparentBusiness software, which allows employers or clients to monitor the activity of those working for them on computers via a cloud-supported activity monitor and screenshots. In 2012 TransparentBusiness received the PC World Latin America Rising Star Award for the Best Cloud Computing Solution for Enterprise.
