= Farzad Nazem =

Iranian-born American businessman (born 1961)

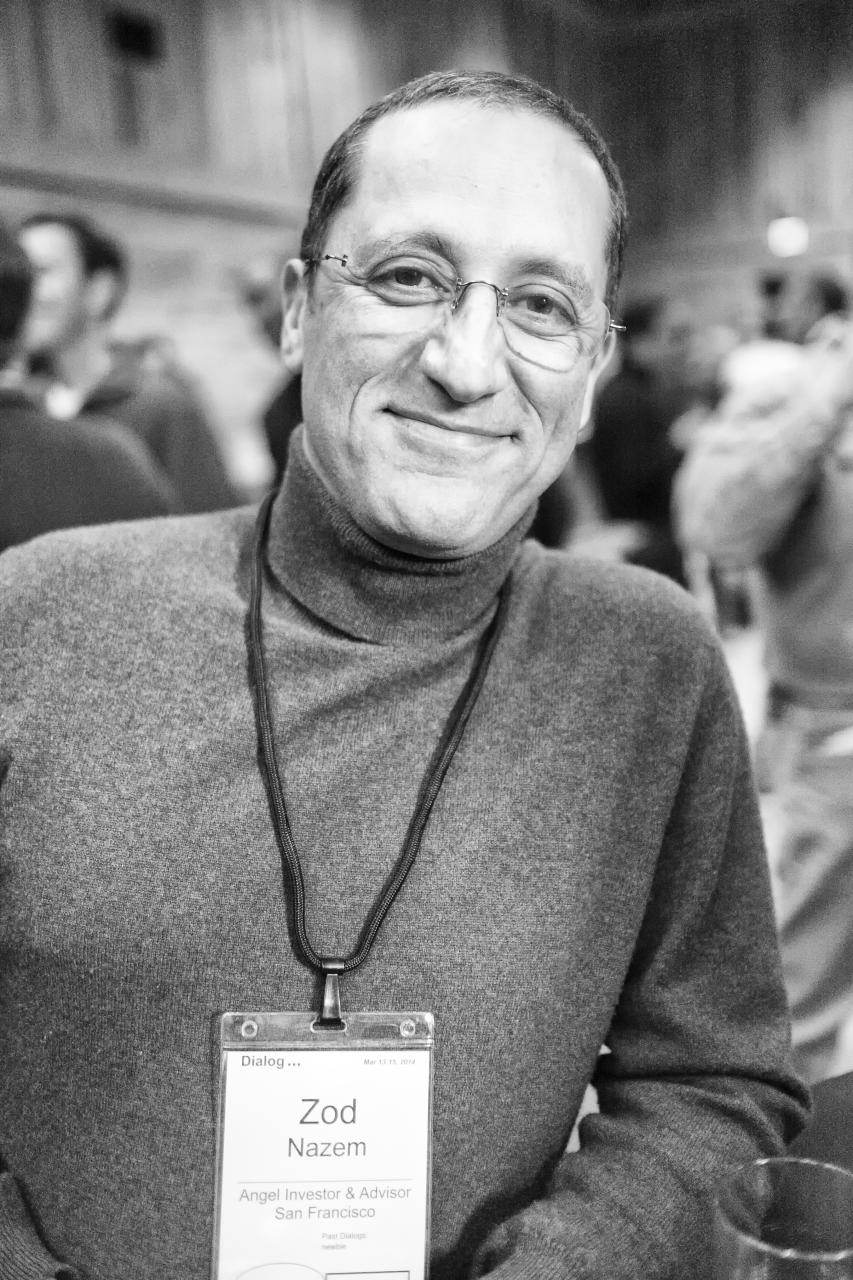
- Farzad Nazem photographed by Christopher Michel in 2014
- Born: 1961 (age 64–65); Tehran, Pahlavi Iran (now Iran)
- Other name: Zod Nazem
- Education: California Polytechnic State University, San Luis Obispo (BS)
- Spouse: Noosheen Hashemi
- Children: 2

Farzad Nazem (Persian: فرزاد ناظم; born 1961), also known as Zod Nazem, is an Iranian-born American executive and businessman. He was Yahoo!'s chief technology officer, and one of its longest-serving executives. On May 30, 2007, at age 45, he announced that he would retire and leave Yahoo! in June of that year. Since retirement, Nazem has spent most of his time on investments, and philanthropy.

== Early life ==
Farzad Nazem was born in 1961, in Tehran, Pahlavi Iran (now Iran). He began working at the young age of 13 and paid his way through college.

At the age of 19, he graduated with a B.S. degree in computer science with high honors from the California Polytechnic State University, San Luis Obispo.

== Career highlights ==
Nazem started his technical career in the VLCBX Division at Rolm Corporation, producing large, computer-based telephone switches. He was soon recruited to join Sydis Inc., a spin-off of Rolm, as a senior engineer. Sydis was positioning itself to become the leading provider of hybrid telephony and computer platform of the early 1980s.

In 1985, Nazem joined Oracle Corporation, what was then a small pre-IPO company. He spent a little over 10 years at Oracle working closely with its CEO, Larry Ellison, on strategic projects like the creation of the “Information Super Highway.” This effort of the early 1990s was meant to bring information and entertainment to consumers’ homes by providing the software platforms for Video Serving and other services to Telcos. By the time Nazem left Oracle, the company had grown from 350 to around 35,000 employees.

When Nazem was recruited by Yahoo! in 1996, the company was less than a year old and had yet to go public. At the time, Lycos, Infoseek and Excite were considered established and more popular internet search engines while Yahoo! was better described as an internet directory. Nazem was brought to Yahoo! to build the engineering organization, take over site operation, and complete the executive team in preparation for the company's public debut.

Under Nazem, Yahoo! became an internet giant. Nazem led several initiatives that helped Yahoo! grow rapidly and distinguish itself from competitors including a very scalable infrastructure composed of farms of small generic servers with a free operating system (FreeBSD). The cost effectiveness and the scalability translated to a more reliable user experience while having the highest profit margins in the industry. In 1997, Yahoo! entered the crowded email market and quickly added hundreds of millions of users, becoming the most popular mail server. Additionally, through all the innovations, Yahoo! became a web portal and originator of the personalized web experience, My Yahoo.

Throughout Yahoo!’s surge, Nazem spearheaded over 50 company acquisitions, which helped in building out the different services offered by Yahoo!. Almost all of the acquisitions were technology companies and he was in charge of the integration of the people and the services.

Because of its dedication to innovation and Nazem’s strong and effective leadership, Yahoo! was one of three companies (the other two being eBay and Amazon.com) that survived the internet bubble burst of 2000 and 2001. Collectively these companies were dubbed the “3 horsemen of the Internet.” Particularly significant, Nazem was the only remaining executive from the first phase who remained through the burst and into the second phase of Yahoo!’s growth. As such, he provided stability and continuity and set the groundwork for continual innovation. On May 30, 2007, at age 45, he announced that he would retire and leave Yahoo! in June of that year. After he left Yahoo! the company named Terry Semel as the CEO days later, due to disgruntled investors.

== Post-Yahoo! ==
Upon his retirement from day to day operations at Yahoo!, Nazem released an official statement on Yahoo’s corporate blog, Yodel Anecdotal. In this statement, he wrote “After spending the last 26 years in this fast-paced technology industry, I’ve finally decided it's time to slow down. I'll be retiring in early June. After joining tiny little start-ups like Oracle and then Yahoo!, I never imagined things would take off the way they have. And looking back on my eleven years here at Yahoo!, I’m amazed at all that this company has accomplished. Yahoo! has played such a significant role in building the Internet into what it is today and I’m incredibly proud to have been a part of such a talented team.”

Nazem's dedication to Yahoo and the technical community, as well as his influence and impact, continued long after his retirement. While at Yahoo!, Nazem mentored many Yahoo! alumni who have gone on to found, lead, and invest in numerous companies. Now, Nazem spends his time coaching entrepreneurs on technical architecture, market strategy, fundraising, talent development, and mergers and acquisitions. Since 2010, he has invested in more than 60 technology-driven companies in the areas of big data, cloud, health, and medical. His investments have yielded several successful exits, including acquisitions by Google, Yahoo!, Apigee, Twitter, and Cisco.

== Other activities ==
Nazem, his wife Noosheen Hashemi, and two children live in the San Francisco Bay Area.

In 2003, Nazem and his wife, Noosheen Hashemi, co-founded a private family foundation, the Hand Foundation in Menlo Park, California. He serves on its board of directors. Nazem is also on the Board of Trustees of The Nueva School.

Nazem holds a few patents in the area of information technology.
