= United States Semiquincentennial Commission =

Commission on US 250th anniversary

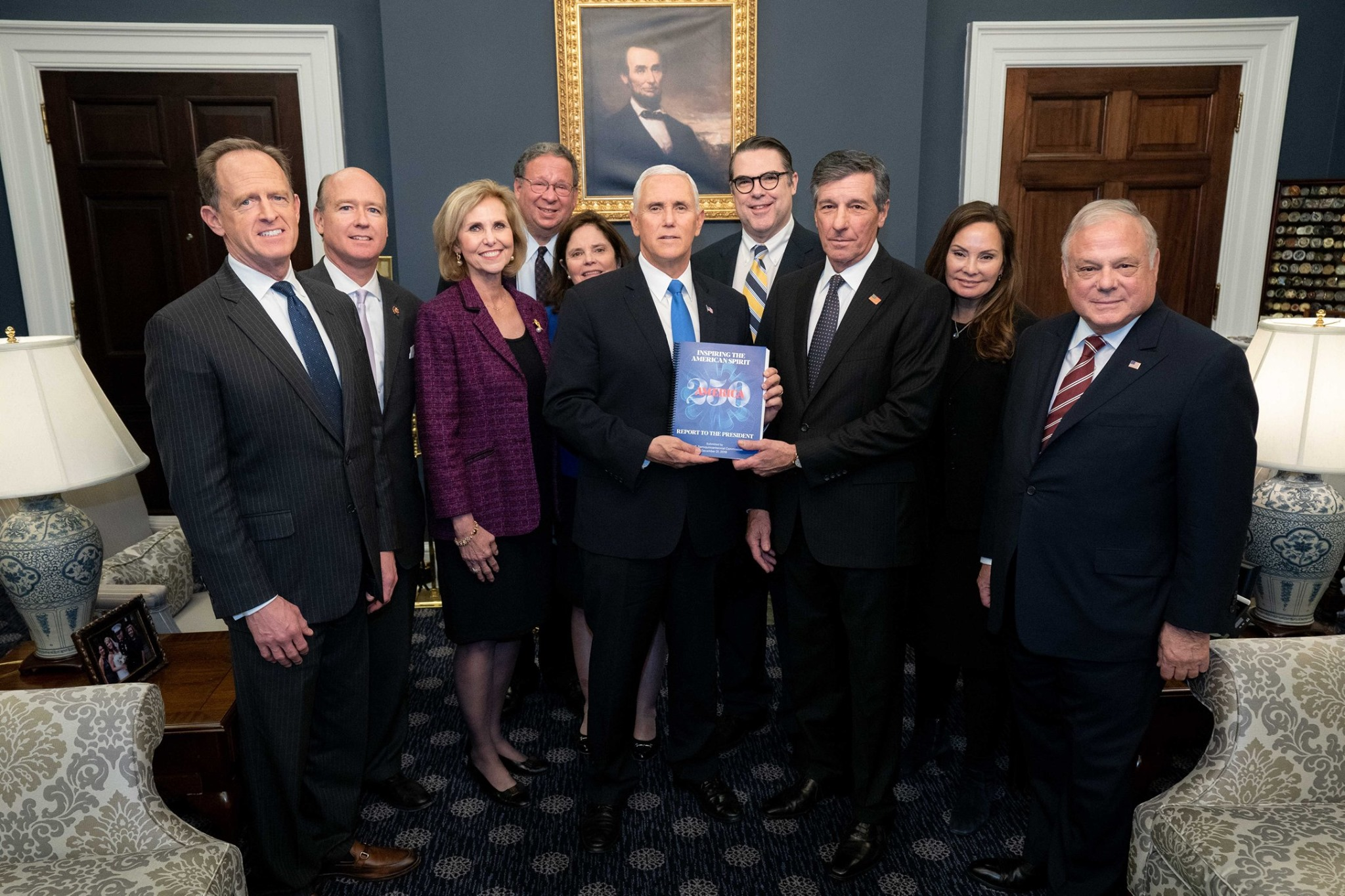
Members of the Semiquincentennial Commission present then-vice president Mike Pence with a copy of a congressionally-required report in front of a Lincoln portrait by George Henry Story, on January 15, 2020, at the Vice President's Office in the West Wing of the White House. From left to right: Senator Pat Toomey, Rep. Robert Aderholt, Lynn Forney Young, David L. Cohen, Cathy Gillespie, Vice President Mike Pence; James L. Swanson, Dan DiLella, Rosie Gumataotao Rios, and Frank Giordano, executive director of the commission.

The United States Semiquincentennial Commission is the congressionally appointed body in charge of promoting and coordinating the United States Semiquincentennial. It was created in 2016 as a bipartisan initiative signed into law by President Barack Obama. The commission has been chaired by Rosie Rios since July 2022.

The commission, going by the branding America250, is separate from the Donald Trump-aligned White House Task Force on Celebrating America's 250th Birthday, going by the branding Freedom 250. In 2025, federal resources were diverted away from America250 and the Interior Department instructed its staff to make Freedom 250 the "primary branding" for all national events. The change led to confusion by artists and the public over their connection to the Trump administration, and was described as "overshadowing" the commission's plans.

== Formation ==
The commission was created by Pub. L. 114–196 (text) (PDF), 130 Stat. 685, enacted July 22, 2016, and signed by President of the United States Barack Obama. The act was amended by Pub. L. 116–282 (text) (PDF), 130 Stat. 685, enacted December 31, 2020, to allow the commission to accept congressional funding, alter the non-voting ex officio membership, and to make other technical changes, such as not requiring all meetings to be held in Philadelphia, and instead requiring only one be held each year in that city.

The commissioners, who are designated by the party leaders of the United States Senate and the House, count a total of eight from Congress, of which, two from each chamber will be designated by their party leader, respectively. In addition, the law provides for the appointment of private citizens, defined as those who are neither employees nor offices of any federal or state or local government. These are appointed by the aforementioned party leadership, with each leader naming four, for a total of sixteen. Among these sixteen, the President of the United States designates a chairperson.

On November 16, 2018, the then-33 members, of the commission, who are referred to as commissioners, were sworn in at Independence Hall in Philadelphia, which was chosen by Congress "to honor the historical significance of the building as the site of deliberations and adoption of both the United States Declaration of Independence and Constitution," and convened their first organizing meeting to begin eight years of planning and organizing for the 250th national birthday celebration. Chairman DiLella, designated as such by President Donald Trump, estimated that the group would meet three or four times a year. The new commission originally consisted of 16 private citizens, including chairman DiLella, eight members of Congress and nine federal officials. In 2020, the organic law was amended to increase the number of non voting ex officio federal officials to a total of 12, including a member designated by the chief justice of the United States, increasing the overall body's membership to 36.

All commission work, which consists of "inclusion — geographic, demographic — [as] a core theme," shall cease by its termination, on December 31, 2027.

As determined by its organic law, the United States secretary of the interior held a competitive application process to select "the nonprofit partner that [would] serve as Administrative Secretariat for the...Commission." On May 4, 2018, the then-Civil War Trust, now known as the American Battlefield Trust, was chosen. The Administrative Secretariat's responsibilities include housing the commission, raising funds for it and preparing reports to Congress on behalf of the commission. Additionally, the commission works in tandem with the America250 Foundation, "its private, nonprofit partner," which was founded in 2019 by the commission and trust themselves, and is "the primary service provider to the [commission]," under a master service agreement enacted in May 2020. The commission and foundation both "share a website" and work and identify themselves under America250 banner, in addition to having the DiLella as chairman in both organizations. In addition, the commission helped create a congressional caucus, the Congressional America250 Caucus to act as a liaison between commission and Congress.

On November 2, 2020, Donald Trump, through Executive Order 13958, determined that the 1776 Commission shall "advise and offer recommendations to the president and the United States Semiquincentennial Commission regarding the federal government's plans to celebrate the 250th anniversary of American independence and coordinate with relevant external stakeholders on their plans." On the following January 20, the aforesaid executive order was rescinded by Joe Biden, through Executive Order 13985, on his first day in office. It was re-established by Trump upon his re-election in January 2025.

== Funding ==
Under its 2016 original enabling legislation, "[a]ll expenditures of the commission shall be made solely from donated funds," however, the 2020 amendments permitted that "[a]ll expenditures of the commission shall be made from donations, earned income, and any funds made available."The Office of Management and Budget's (OMB) PAYGO 2020 annual report details a net PAYGO impact of $0 even after its planned life course up until 2030. The OMB did not originally score the $8 million contribution under Public Law 116–260, labeling it "as a non-expenditure development transfer," regardless, they corrected the error afterwards.For its work in the immediate four-year run-up to the Semiquincentennial, the commission requested that their appropriations be almost doubled, from $8 million to $15 million. Per the proposed budget for fiscal year 2023:

As the Commission approaches 2026, increased activities will require escalating funding levels from the public and private sector to fulfill its mission. The Commission will be reviewing, approving and adopting a number of Commemorative National Signature Programs and National Partner Programs during calendar year 2022. The ability to execute these programs during the primary years from July 4, 2024, through July 4, 2026, will require initial operational funding. This early operational program funding will be used to mobilize 10–15 national programs. This funding will be critical to begin the implementation and execution phases of these America250 signature programs. The Commission envisions needing a minimum of one year or longer to build out the initial infrastructure and operational plan for each program to include but not be limited to; staffing, contracting, operational, and fundraising support. For FY 2023, the Commission requests $15,000,000 to continue necessary expenses and to initiate the execution of national programs and operational plans.

— The Budget for Fiscal Year 2023

In February 2022, it was reported that "[t]he commission [had] received some $12 million in federal appropriations so far, most of which it has turned over to the America250 Foundation," however, the following month, per Commissioner James L. Swanson, the amount ascended to "$20 million so far," probably due to the approval of an additional $8 million in the days following his statement.

According to an internal finance report, the foundation was primarily funded by the commission, which transferred $11.8 million of congressional appropriations, as of December 2021. The second-highest donor was catalogued as an unnamed "national sponsor" that contributed $2 million, which was later revealed to be Facebook, under a June 2021 agreement that provides for a total of $10 million to be paid in instalments.

Congress has designated the following amounts:

Federal appropriations
FY	Amount	Enabling legislation	Ref.
2019	$500,000 (Note: As the 2020 Amendments had not been enacted yet, which provided for federal appropriations for the Commission, the funds were destined "notwithstanding section 9(a)" of the 2016 Act and were specifically destined for use of the Administrative Secretariat, as stated that it "shall be provided to the organization selected under section 9(b) of [the United States Semiquincentennial Commission Act of 2016],")	Pub. L. 116–6 (text) (PDF), 133 Stat. 212, enacted February 15, 2019	
2020	$3,300,000	Pub. L. 116–94 (text) (PDF), 133 Stat. 2692, enacted December 20, 2019	
2021	$8,000,000	Pub. L. 116–260 (text) (PDF), 134 Stat. 1483, enacted December 27, 2020	
2022	$8,000,000	Public Law No: 117–103	
2023	$15,000,000	Projected (Note: The FY2022 Budget Policy forecasted the following appropriations: 2023 $8,000,000; 2024 $8,000,000; 2025 $9,000,000; 2026 $9,000,000; 2027 $9,000,000; with funding past the Commission's termination, with $9 million for FYs 2028 and 2029 and $10 million for FYs 2030 and 2031. In a similar manner the FY2023 Budget Policy estimates subsidies amounting to $17 million for FYs 2028 and 2029, with an increase to $18 million for FYs 2030 through 2032.)	
2024	$15,000,000	Projected	
2025	$16,000,000	Projected	
2026	$16,000,000	Projected	
2027	$16,000,000	Projected	

== Concerns and incidents ==
During the months of February and March 2022, through a series of Wall Street Journal exposés, the commission, along with the America250 Foundation, were "accused . . . of a variety of misdeeds (including discrimination, which the foundation denies)," even though the foundation had stated that in its presidential and CEO job opening that it was "committed to an inclusive environment where diverse thinking and opinions are shared in a supportive, team-oriented environment."

- The federal commission charged with
- commemorating America's
- semiquincentennial is at war with
- itself over allegations of
- featherbedding, favoritism and
- misappropriation of taxpayer funds.

— Jess Bravin, The Wall Street Journal

=== Sexism allegations ===
In September 2021, both Anna Laymon, who had served as vice president of programs and planning, as well as Keri Potts, then-vice president of communications and publications, resigned. The former stated that, among "bouts of organizational instability and mismanagement," there was also a lack of "women in any of the most important positions of power and influence at America250," with her appointment being "used as window dressing with each layer of higher level leadership positions being filled with men."

The following December, both Renee Burchard, then-chief administration officer and chief of staff, and Garlock, who had served as the foundation's chief legal officer, resigned on the same day.

A letter that was sent to Burchard the following month was cause for an inquiry by the office of Commissioner Bonnie Watson Coleman, one of two Democratic Representatives in the commission. The day after being contacted by Rep. Watson Coleman's office, "Chairman...DiLella, who serves as chairman of both the commission and the foundation, emailed other leaders saying that "four former senior members raised certain concerns." He promised "a thorough, impartial investigation into the issues raised, to be conducted by a third-party." However, as of March 2022, chief communications officer Michael Frazier stated "that no one had yet been selected to conduct such an investigation."

Burchard's eleven-page resignation letter alleged that the foundation's legal counsel had determined that Jesse Askew, vice president of branding and marketing, should have been terminated for submitting "fraudulent expense report and unauthorized invoices" totaling $30,000 of federally-appropriated money, which, nevertheless, had been subsequently approved. Since Askew is Black, then-interim foundation president, Scott Hommel, determined that September to not fire him. Burchard reported that Hommel's decision boiled down to the public relations implications, and, that a soon-to-be employee who happened to be Black should fire Askew, as Hommel declared "when a black guy fires a black guy, then it's not that bad and would be viewed differently."

Askew alleged that Garlock had approved said invoices, however, she stated that "[a]s chief legal officer, I never had the authority to approve, ratify or sign contracts on behalf of the foundation. These agreements, if executed, were entered into over strong and continuous objections."

After the initial news report, three commissioners, Senator Robert Casey, as well as representatives Dwight Evans and Watson Coleman, wrote to DiLella, citing the article, as well as their concerns relating that the misuse of funds "or any discriminations in any way involved in their expenditure in unacceptable." In response, DiLella stated that they allegations were taken "seriously," they had knowledge of the complaints," there would be "plans to hire n outside firm to investigate the allegations," and that he believed that the ensuing results of the investing would entirely vindicate the commission.

On February 25, the four former executives filed a lawsuit in the United States District Court for the District of Columbia against the commission, the foundation, and the America Battlefield Trust, "alleging mismanagement and discrimination drove them from their jobs." The suit also alleges that both the commission and the Trust failed in their oversight roles of the foundation, with accusing leadership of "cronyism, self-dealing, mismanagement of funds, potentially unlawful contracting practices and wasteful spending." In addition, it states that DiLella had repeatedly named associates of him to positions of importance, some of the appointments starting off on a voluntary basis and then being transferred to being compensated, a practice, which, in turn created "a 'boys club,' freezing out the women who were given titles and large responsibilities, but no authority or input into key decisions of the foundation," since, "[f]rom the creation of the foundation until December 2021, only four women served in executive leadership roles," who, coincidentally, were the four plaintiffs.

The requested redress are lost wages, as well as "a Court-mandated full forensic investigation of the foundation and Commission with respect to pay practices, employment policies and financial transactions and contracts." By March 7, Frazier publicly expressed his and DiLella's hopes of commencing a review in the following 30 days.

=== Facebook ===
In March 2022, the foundation entered into an agreement with Meta Platforms, "giving Facebook's parent an inside role in producing and promoting the Semiquincentennial commemoration in exchange for $10 million." The agreement, which was approved by Chairman DiLella, was criticized for providing Facebook with "too much influence," as well as privileges that might discourage other potential sponsors. Per Commissioner Andrew Hohns, the commission's rules require that all "contracts that include the use of the commission's...identity" need prior approval by the commission, nonetheless, none had been, nor had the details of the Facebook contract been made known to the whole of the commission.

Meta had been "reviewing its association" after the resignation and discrimination reports were made public, nonetheless, they went ahead, becoming America250's exclusive "social connectivity partner, helping "to plan and present the commemorations," as well as appointing Meta CEO Mark Zuckerberg to its advisory Corporate Leader Council. Furthermore, America250 will support Facebook's Occulus VR in their pursuit to fly drones over federal property "to catalog National Parks and Landmarks," requesting the organization to coordinate meetings between the company and Department Interior staff, as well as "outsourcing some Semiquincentennial observances to Meta."

The deal, which was brokered by 21 Sports and Entertainment Marketing Group Inc. and entitled to a 17% commission, was considered by Anna Laymon, then-vice president of programs and planning, in a recording as "seems...to give Facebook special access to a federal agency," while Rob Prazmark, an officer of the aforementioned broker, revealed that it "had been approved by Thomas McGarrigle, a friend of Mr. DiLella who is serving as the foundation's counsel."

At a September 2021 executive meeting, Renee Burchard, a former-employee like Laymon, "warned that Facebook's involvement could be a deal breaker for other companies," when discussing strategies to lure in other potential corporate sponsors such as Walmart, which has allegedly declined sponsorship invitations.

=== Centralization ===
As was expected, on Wednesday, March 9, 2022, in a closed-door meeting, the commission voted to increase DiLella's power, in response to a meeting the previous September where "three members challenged [his] leadership," which was catalogued as "a lack of decorum and respect for fellow commissioners." These "dissenting commissioners" charged DiLella with "improperly transferring the body's functions and federal appropriations to the private America250 Foundation, which he and his allies control."

Commissioner Frazier had stated that "[t]he Governance Committee spent more than 100 hours, including 14 hours in meetings deliberating on comments and suggestions." Some of the changes, which were approved by a 12–10 margin in a Zoom meeting where it was "proceeded to a vote without debate," included "[giving] DiLella a stronger control over the commission, with power to appoint officers and committee members, limit commissioners' participation in meetings and withhold information from both the public and other commissioners," in tune with DiLella's allege wish that the federal agency "operate more like a business."

In addition, the commission endorsed DiLella's actions during the previous years that had not received commission authorization by giving blanket approval. For his part, Joseph Crowley, who had served as a Representative in the commission, and afterwards as a private citizen, had previously declared that he was "not comfortable with rubber stamping everything that has been done over the past three years." On the March 9 meeting, Crowley, who decried it as "very authoritarian and not at all in the Spirit of '76," and representatives Robert Aderholt and Bonnie Watson Coleman, the lattermost of whom held up a sign that read "I Demand to Be Heard," all requested to speak and were ignored by DiLella.

=== Politicization ===
The second presidency of Donald Trump was criticized for attempting to exert more control over the non-partisan organization amid fears of politicization. Trump installed Fox News hosts and Trump campaign officials as the head of the organization, and dropped contractors with ties to Democrats. In May 2025, the group was criticized for partnering with a cryptocurrency event in Las Vegas that featured Trump's two older sons. It also partnered with conservative organizations such as PragerU to provide educational materials for festivities. The "America250" brand was allowed at Trump rallies, added pictures of Trump to the organization's website, removed mentions of Democratic officials involved in the effort, and partnered with conservative organization Moms for Liberty. A letter to Rios and Abergel by all of the Democratic lawmakers on the commission wrote that: "Unfortunately, recent America250 funded and branded events have been partisan and have not served America250's purpose and mission of uniting us as a nation." It also questioned its relationship to the Trump-led Task Force 250 and its events.

It also received criticism for allowing Trump's political fundraiser, Meredith O'Rouke, to raise money for a similarly named "America250 Inc." foundation at the behest of the commission to receive donations "from a list of companies with executives close to Trump who stand to benefit from his presidency".

In July, Trump's top political appointee and former Fox News producer Ariel Abergel sought to remove four Republican commissioners to make way for new Trump appointees. The request was reiterated by House Speaker Mike Johnson, who applied pressure on one appointee at the request of the White House. According to The Atlantic, the move backfired, and set off "a struggle for control of the organization". Members of the commission interviewed stated that they believed the request for resignations was to remove "apolitical historical boosters and academics" with individuals more loyal to Trump and one of whom could then be elevated by Trump to replace Rosie Rios, although the White House denied this and stated it could replace Rios at any time. Appointees described Rios allowing the White House to appoint Ariel as executive director in 2025, following which Ariel and the executive committee approved America250's brand and nonprofit to be used in the Army 250 parade in June and at Trump rallies. Rios then signaled all decisions would be made with the full committee.

In September 2025, the commission fired Ariel Abergel. A spokesperson wrote that he was fired "after he initiated a security breach of a commission social-media account, attempted to procure the resignations of multiple commissioners by misrepresenting himself as acting on behalf of Congressional leadership, and engaged in multiple other serious and repeated breaches of authority and trust", which they described as threatening the "Commission's operations and reputation" to include defying directives from the executive committee and independently approving programming, finances, and communications without permission. Sources told The Wall Street Journal that Abergel attempted to steer the theme of events towards honoring Trump. Abergel disputed the characterizations, calling them "malicious lies" meant to "distract from the truth" and asserted he was fired for using the commission's social media accounts to honor Charlie Kirk following his death.

==== Des Moines, Iowa speech ====
Trump was criticized for using America250 events to promote his agenda and criticize Democrats. During the opening announcement for America250 in Des Moines, Iowa on July 3, 2025, Trump criticized Democrats and said those who voted against his One Big Beautiful Bill Act "hate our country". He also mocked former president Joe Biden's speaking style, repeated his lie of a stolen 2020 election, criticized the "fake news" media, and engaged in campaign-style rhetoric praising his accomplishments and suggesting he was the greatest president in United States history. The Associated Press called Trump as viewing "patriotism as inseparable from his own agenda". Ambassador Monica Crowley was criticized for delivering "an ode" to Trump before the speech, describing him as the inheritor of the country's original revolutionary spirit. The event also featured large amounts of pro-Trump campaign gear and memorabilia.

==== Diverted funding ====
By the end of 2025, $10 million worth of funding towards America250 was diverted to Freedom 250's "Freedom Trucks". In early 2026, Representative Bonnie Watson Coleman stated that America250 had only received $25 million of its congressionally appropriated $150 million, and was concerned the remainder would be reallocated to the Trump-aligned Freedom 250. The 250 Commission stated that it had enough money to continue with its original programming, which include "America's Field Trip" asking students across the country what America means to them, and the national volunteering effort "America Gives". During a 2026 congressional hearing, Representative Maxine Dexter expressed concerns that the Trump-aligned Freedom 250 was using public money and mixing it with private donations, and that the structure of the organization made it difficult to trace where the money came from. The Interior Department has stated that the U.S. Semiquincentennial Commission receives money through an interagency agreement with the National Park Service, but did not respond to questions regarding the distribution of federal money to America250.

=== Confusion between Freedom 250 and America250 ===
Differences between the events and initiatives hosted by the bipartisan America 250 and the Trump-aligned Freedom 250 organizations caused public confusion by artists and performers over their association with the Trump administration. The Associated Press reported that Trump's own celebrations had "overshadowed" the bipartisan commission.

== List of commissioners of the United States Semiquincentennial ==
Year	Members of Congress								Private citizens																Non voting ex officio	
Year	Senate				House				Senate								House								Non voting ex officio	
Year	Democrat		Republican		Democrat		Republican		Democrat				Republican				Democrat				Republican				Non voting ex officio	
Year	Democrat		Republican		Democrat		Republican		* indicates Chairperson, as designated by the President.																Non voting ex officio	
2016	Bob Casey Jr.	Jeanne Shaheen	Vacant	Vacant	Vacant	Vacant	Vacant	Vacant	David L. Cohen	Andrew Hohns	Heather Murren (Note: Resigned before being sworn in.)	James L. Swanson	Vacant	Vacant	Vacant	Vacant	Vacant	Vacant	Vacant	Vacant	Vacant	Vacant	Vacant	Vacant	Continuous	Secretary of the Interior
2017	Bob Casey Jr.	Jeanne Shaheen	Tom Cotton	Pat Toomey	Vacant	Vacant	Vacant	Vacant	David L. Cohen	Andrew Hohns	Heather Murren	James L. Swanson	Daniel DiLella	Cathy Gillespie	Lucas Morel	Thomas Walker, Jr.	Vacant	Vacant	Vacant	Vacant	Vacant	Vacant	Vacant	Vacant	Continuous	Secretary of the Interior
2017	Bob Casey Jr.	Jeanne Shaheen	Tom Cotton	Pat Toomey	Vacant	Vacant	Robert Aderholt	Pat Meehan	David L. Cohen	Andrew Hohns	Heather Murren	James L. Swanson	Daniel DiLella	Cathy Gillespie	Lucas Morel	Thomas Walker, Jr.	Vacant	Vacant	Vacant	Vacant	Val Crofts	Jim Koch	Wilfred M. McClay	Lynn Forney Young	Continuous	Secretary of the Interior
2017	Bob Casey Jr.	Jeanne Shaheen	Tom Cotton	Pat Toomey	Bob Brady	Joe Crowley	Robert Aderholt	Pat Meehan	David L. Cohen	Andrew Hohns	Heather Murren	James L. Swanson	Daniel DiLella	Cathy Gillespie	Lucas Morel	Thomas Walker, Jr.	Vacant	Vacant	Vacant	Richard Trumka	Val Crofts	Jim Koch	Wilfred M. McClay	Lynn Forney Young	Continuous	Secretary of the Interior
2017	Bob Casey Jr.	Jeanne Shaheen	Tom Cotton	Pat Toomey	Bob Brady	Joe Crowley	Robert Aderholt	Pat Meehan	David L. Cohen	Andrew Hohns	Resigned	James L. Swanson	Daniel DiLella	Cathy Gillespie	Lucas Morel	Thomas Walker, Jr.	Grant Hill	Noah Griffin	Amy Gutmann	Richard Trumka	Val Crofts	Jim Koch	Wilfred M. McClay	Lynn Forney Young	Continuous	Secretary of the Interior
2018	Bob Casey Jr.	Jeanne Shaheen	Tom Cotton	Pat Toomey	Bob Brady	Joe Crowley	Robert Aderholt	Pat Meehan	David L. Cohen	Andrew Hohns	Vacant	James L. Swanson	Daniel DiLella	Cathy Gillespie	Lucas Morel	Thomas Walker, Jr.	Grant Hill	Noah Griffin	Amy Gutmann	Richard Trumka	Val Crofts	Jim Koch	Wilfred M. McClay	Lynn Forney Young	Continuous	Secretary of the Interior
2018	Bob Casey Jr.	Jeanne Shaheen	Tom Cotton	Pat Toomey	Bob Brady	Joe Crowley	Robert Aderholt	Pat Meehan	David L. Cohen	Andrew Hohns	* Rosa Gumataotao Rios	James L. Swanson	Daniel DiLella	Cathy Gillespie	Lucas Morel	Thomas Walker, Jr.	Grant Hill	Noah Griffin	Amy Gutmann	Richard Trumka	Val Crofts	Jim Koch	Wilfred M. McClay	Lynn Forney Young	Continuous	Secretary of the Interior
2018	Bob Casey Jr.	Jeanne Shaheen	Tom Cotton	Pat Toomey	Bob Brady	Joe Crowley	Robert Aderholt	Resigned	David L. Cohen	Andrew Hohns	* Rosa Gumataotao Rios	James L. Swanson	Daniel DiLella	Cathy Gillespie	Lucas Morel	Thomas Walker, Jr.	Resigned	Noah Griffin	Resigned	Richard Trumka	Val Crofts	Jim Koch	Wilfred M. McClay	Lynn Forney Young	Continuous	Secretary of the Interior
2018	Bob Casey Jr.	Jeanne Shaheen	Tom Cotton	Pat Toomey	Bob Brady	Joe Crowley	Robert Aderholt	Vacant	David L. Cohen	Andrew Hohns	* Rosa Gumataotao Rios	James L. Swanson	Daniel DiLella	Cathy Gillespie	Lucas Morel	Thomas Walker, Jr.	Vacant	Noah Griffin	Vacant	Richard Trumka	Val Crofts	Jim Koch	Wilfred M. McClay	Lynn Forney Young	Continuous	Secretary of the Interior
2019	Bob Casey Jr.	Jeanne Shaheen	Tom Cotton	Pat Toomey	Bob Brady	Joe Crowley	Robert Aderholt	George Holding	David L. Cohen	Andrew Hohns	* Rosa Gumataotao Rios	James L. Swanson	Daniel DiLella	Cathy Gillespie	Lucas Morel	Thomas Walker, Jr.	Vacant	Noah Griffin	Vacant	Richard Trumka	Val Crofts	Jim Koch	Wilfred M. McClay	Lynn Forney Young	Continuous	Secretary of State
2019	Bob Casey Jr.	Jeanne Shaheen	Tom Cotton	Pat Toomey	Finished term	Finished term	Robert Aderholt	George Holding	David L. Cohen	Andrew Hohns	* Rosa Gumataotao Rios	James L. Swanson	Daniel DiLella	Cathy Gillespie	Lucas Morel	Thomas Walker, Jr.	Bob Brady	Noah Griffin	Vacant	Richard Trumka	Val Crofts	Jim Koch	Wilfred M. McClay	Lynn Forney Young	Continuous	Secretary of State
2019	Bob Casey Jr.	Jeanne Shaheen	Tom Cotton	Pat Toomey	Vacant	Vacant	Robert Aderholt	George Holding	David L. Cohen	Andrew Hohns	* Rosa Gumataotao Rios	James L. Swanson	Daniel DiLella	Cathy Gillespie	Lucas Morel	Thomas Walker, Jr.	Bob Brady	Noah Griffin	Vacant	Richard Trumka	Val Crofts	Jim Koch	Wilfred M. McClay	Lynn Forney Young	Continuous	Attorney General
2019	Bob Casey Jr.	Jeanne Shaheen	Tom Cotton	Pat Toomey	Dwight Evans	Vacant	Robert Aderholt	George Holding	David L. Cohen	Andrew Hohns	* Rosa Gumataotao Rios	James L. Swanson	Daniel DiLella	Cathy Gillespie	Lucas Morel	Thomas Walker, Jr.	Bob Brady	Noah Griffin	Vacant	Richard Trumka	Val Crofts	Jim Koch	Wilfred M. McClay	Lynn Forney Young	Continuous	Attorney General
2019	Bob Casey Jr.	Jeanne Shaheen	Tom Cotton	Pat Toomey	Dwight Evans	Bonnie Watson Coleman	Robert Aderholt	George Holding	David L. Cohen	Andrew Hohns	* Rosa Gumataotao Rios	James L. Swanson	Daniel DiLella	Cathy Gillespie	Lucas Morel	Thomas Walker, Jr.	Bob Brady	Noah Griffin	Vacant	Richard Trumka	Val Crofts	Jim Koch	Wilfred M. McClay	Lynn Forney Young	Continuous	Secretary of Defense
2019	Bob Casey Jr.	Jeanne Shaheen	Tom Cotton	Pat Toomey	Dwight Evans	Bonnie Watson Coleman	Robert Aderholt	George Holding	David L. Cohen	Andrew Hohns	* Rosa Gumataotao Rios	James L. Swanson	Daniel DiLella	Cathy Gillespie	Lucas Morel	Thomas Walker, Jr.	Bob Brady	Noah Griffin	Vacant	Richard Trumka	Val Crofts	Jim Koch	Wilfred M. McClay	Lynn Forney Young	Continuous	Secretary of Education
2019	Bob Casey Jr.	Jeanne Shaheen	Tom Cotton	Pat Toomey	Dwight Evans	Bonnie Watson Coleman	Robert Aderholt	George Holding	David L. Cohen	Andrew Hohns	* Rosa Gumataotao Rios	James L. Swanson	Daniel DiLella	Cathy Gillespie	Lucas Morel	Thomas Walker, Jr.	Bob Brady	Noah Griffin	Vacant	Richard Trumka	Val Crofts	Jim Koch	Wilfred M. McClay	Lynn Forney Young	Continuous	Librarian of Congress
2019	Bob Casey Jr.	Jeanne Shaheen	Tom Cotton	Pat Toomey	Dwight Evans	Bonnie Watson Coleman	Robert Aderholt	George Holding	David L. Cohen	Andrew Hohns	* Rosa Gumataotao Rios	James L. Swanson	Daniel DiLella	Cathy Gillespie	Lucas Morel	Thomas Walker, Jr.	Bob Brady	Noah Griffin	Vacant	Richard Trumka	Val Crofts	Jim Koch	Wilfred M. McClay	Lynn Forney Young	Continuous	Secretary of the Smithsonian Institution
2019	Bob Casey Jr.	Jeanne Shaheen	Tom Cotton	Pat Toomey	Dwight Evans	Bonnie Watson Coleman	Robert Aderholt	George Holding	David L. Cohen	Andrew Hohns	* Rosa Gumataotao Rios	James L. Swanson	Daniel DiLella	Cathy Gillespie	Lucas Morel	Thomas Walker, Jr.	Bob Brady	Noah Griffin	Vacant	Richard Trumka	Val Crofts	Jim Koch	Wilfred M. McClay	Lynn Forney Young	Continuous	Archivist of the United States
2020	Bob Casey Jr.	Jeanne Shaheen	Tom Cotton	Pat Toomey	Dwight Evans	Bonnie Watson Coleman	Robert Aderholt	George Holding	David L. Cohen	Andrew Hohns	* Rosa Gumataotao Rios	James L. Swanson	Daniel DiLella	Cathy Gillespie	Lucas Morel	Thomas Walker, Jr.	Bob Brady	Noah Griffin	Vacant	Richard Trumka	Val Crofts	Jim Koch	Wilfred M. McClay	Lynn Forney Young	Removed in 2020	Presiding officer of the Federal Council on the Arts and the Humanities
2020	Bob Casey Jr.	Jeanne Shaheen	Tom Cotton	Pat Toomey	Dwight Evans	Bonnie Watson Coleman	Robert Aderholt	George Holding	David L. Cohen	Andrew Hohns	* Rosa Gumataotao Rios	James L. Swanson	Daniel DiLella	Cathy Gillespie	Lucas Morel	Thomas Walker, Jr.	Bob Brady	Noah Griffin	Vacant	Richard Trumka	Val Crofts	Jim Koch	Wilfred M. McClay	Lynn Forney Young	Added in 2020	Chairperson of the National Endowment for the Arts
2021	Bob Casey Jr.	Jeanne Shaheen	Tom Cotton	Pat Toomey	Dwight Evans	Bonnie Watson Coleman	Robert Aderholt	George Holding	David L. Cohen	Andrew Hohns	* Rosa Gumataotao Rios	James L. Swanson	Daniel DiLella	Cathy Gillespie	Lucas Morel	Thomas Walker, Jr.	Bob Brady	Noah Griffin	Vacant	Died	Val Crofts	Jim Koch	Wilfred M. McClay	Lynn Forney Young	Added in 2020	Chairperson of the National Endowment for the Arts
2021	Bob Casey Jr.	Jeanne Shaheen	Tom Cotton	Pat Toomey	Dwight Evans	Bonnie Watson Coleman	Robert Aderholt	Finished term	David L. Cohen	Andrew Hohns	* Rosa Gumataotao Rios	James L. Swanson	Daniel DiLella	Cathy Gillespie	Lucas Morel	Thomas Walker, Jr.	Bob Brady	Noah Griffin	Vacant	Vacant	Val Crofts	Jim Koch	Wilfred M. McClay	Lynn Forney Young	Added in 2020	Chairperson of the National Endowment for the Arts
2021	Bob Casey Jr.	Jeanne Shaheen	Tom Cotton	Pat Toomey	Dwight Evans	Bonnie Watson Coleman	Robert Aderholt	Vacant	David L. Cohen	Andrew Hohns	* Rosa Gumataotao Rios	James L. Swanson	Daniel DiLella	Cathy Gillespie	Lucas Morel	Thomas Walker, Jr.	Bob Brady	Noah Griffin	Vacant	Vacant	Val Crofts	Jim Koch	Wilfred M. McClay	Lynn Forney Young	Added in 2020	Chairperson of the National Endowment for the Arts
2021	Bob Casey Jr.	Jeanne Shaheen	Tom Cotton	Pat Toomey	Dwight Evans	Bonnie Watson Coleman	Robert Aderholt	Maria Elvira Salazar	David L. Cohen	Andrew Hohns	* Rosa Gumataotao Rios	James L. Swanson	Daniel DiLella	Cathy Gillespie	Lucas Morel	Thomas Walker, Jr.	Bob Brady	Noah Griffin	Vacant	Vacant	Val Crofts	Jim Koch	Wilfred M. McClay	Lynn Forney Young	Added in 2020	Chairperson of the National Endowment for the Arts
2021	Bob Casey Jr.	Jeanne Shaheen	Tom Cotton	Pat Toomey	Dwight Evans	Bonnie Watson Coleman	Robert Aderholt	Maria Elvira Salazar	David L. Cohen	Andrew Hohns	* Rosa Gumataotao Rios	James L. Swanson	Daniel DiLella	Cathy Gillespie	Lucas Morel	Thomas Walker, Jr.	Bob Brady	Noah Griffin	Joe Crowley	Vacant	Val Crofts	Jim Koch	Wilfred M. McClay	Lynn Forney Young	Added in 2020	Chairperson of the National Endowment for the Arts
2022	Bob Casey Jr.	Jeanne Shaheen	Tom Cotton	Pat Toomey	Dwight Evans	Bonnie Watson Coleman	Robert Aderholt	Maria Elvira Salazar	David L. Cohen	Andrew Hohns	* Rosa Gumataotao Rios	James L. Swanson	Daniel DiLella	Cathy Gillespie	Lucas Morel	Thomas Walker, Jr.	Bob Brady	Noah Griffin	Joe Crowley	Vacant	Val Crofts	Jim Koch	Wilfred M. McClay	Lynn Forney Young	Added in 2020	Chairperson of the National Endowment for the Arts
2022	Bob Casey Jr.	Jeanne Shaheen	Tom Cotton	Pat Toomey	Dwight Evans	Bonnie Watson Coleman	Robert Aderholt	Maria Elvira Salazar	David L. Cohen	Andrew Hohns	* Rosa Gumataotao Rios	James L. Swanson	Daniel DiLella	Cathy Gillespie	Lucas Morel	Thomas Walker, Jr.	Bob Brady	Noah Griffin	Joe Crowley	Vacant	Val Crofts	Jim Koch	Wilfred M. McClay	Lynn Forney Young	Added in 2020	Chairperson of the National Endowment for the Humanities
2022	Bob Casey Jr.	Jeanne Shaheen	Tom Cotton	Pat Toomey	Dwight Evans	Bonnie Watson Coleman	Robert Aderholt	Maria Elvira Salazar	David L. Cohen	Andrew Hohns	* Rosa Gumataotao Rios	James L. Swanson	Daniel DiLella	Cathy Gillespie	Lucas Morel	Thomas Walker, Jr.	Bob Brady	Noah Griffin	Joe Crowley	Vacant	Val Crofts	Jim Koch	Wilfred M. McClay	Lynn Forney Young	Added in 2020	Director of the Institute of Museum and Library Services
2022	Bob Casey Jr.	Jeanne Shaheen	Tom Cotton	Pat Toomey	Dwight Evans	Bonnie Watson Coleman	Robert Aderholt	Maria Elvira Salazar	David L. Cohen	Andrew Hohns	* Rosa Gumataotao Rios	James L. Swanson	Daniel DiLella	Cathy Gillespie	Lucas Morel	Thomas Walker, Jr.	Bob Brady	Noah Griffin	Joe Crowley	Vacant	Val Crofts	Jim Koch	Wilfred M. McClay	Lynn Forney Young	Added in 2020	Anthony Kennedy (as designated by the Chief Justice of the United States)
2025	Alejandro Padilla	Jeanne Shaheen	Shelley Moore Capito	Lisa Murkowski	Dwight Evans	Bonnie Watson Coleman	Robert Aderholt	Maria Elvira Salazar	Reginald Browne	Tonio Burgos	* Rosa Gumataotao Rios	Paul R. Tetreault	Daniel DiLella	Cathy Gillespie	Lucas Morel	Kellyanne Conway	Bob Brady	Noah Griffin	Joe Crowley	Jack Schlossberg	Val Crofts	James W. Rane	Wilfred M. McClay	Lynn Forney Young		

== See also ==
- Abraham Lincoln Bicentennial Commission
- United States Semiquincentennial
- White House Task Force on Celebrating America's 250th Birthday (Task Force 250)
- America First Policy Institute
