= Ed Massey =

American visual artist

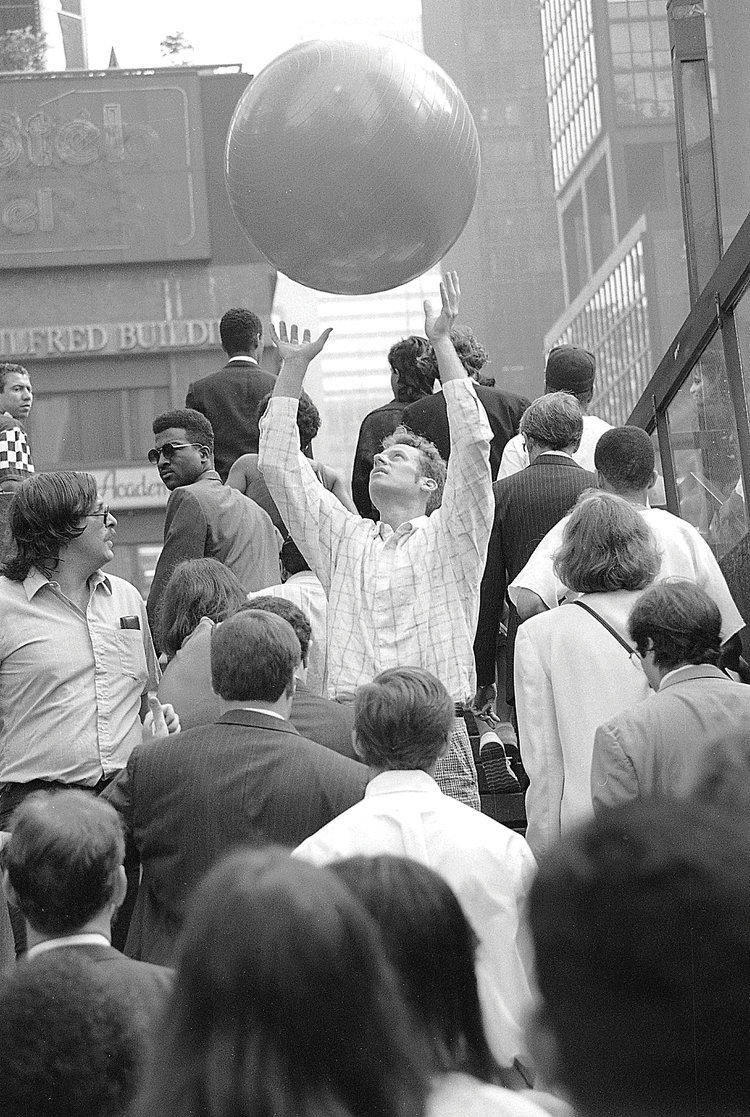
- Born: Los Angeles, California, United States
- Spouse: Dawn Harris Massey
- Website: edmassey.com

Ed Massey is an American visual artist and activist who creates sculptures, large scale paintings, and site-specific mural works as public art that critique social issues and support environmental awareness. His artworks have been exhibited internationally.

Massey is also the artist and creator of Portraits of Hope (POH), a non-profit specializing in large-scale, public-art projects that revitalize under-served areas. Copyrighted designs have covered lifeguard stations, New York City taxi cabs, and air traffic control towers, among others.

== Early life and career ==
Massey graduated from the University of California, Los Angeles (B.A., 1987) and Columbia University (M.F.A., 1990). Massey was originally a sociology major at university, but switched to art for his graduate work.

== Public work ==
=== Sculptures ===
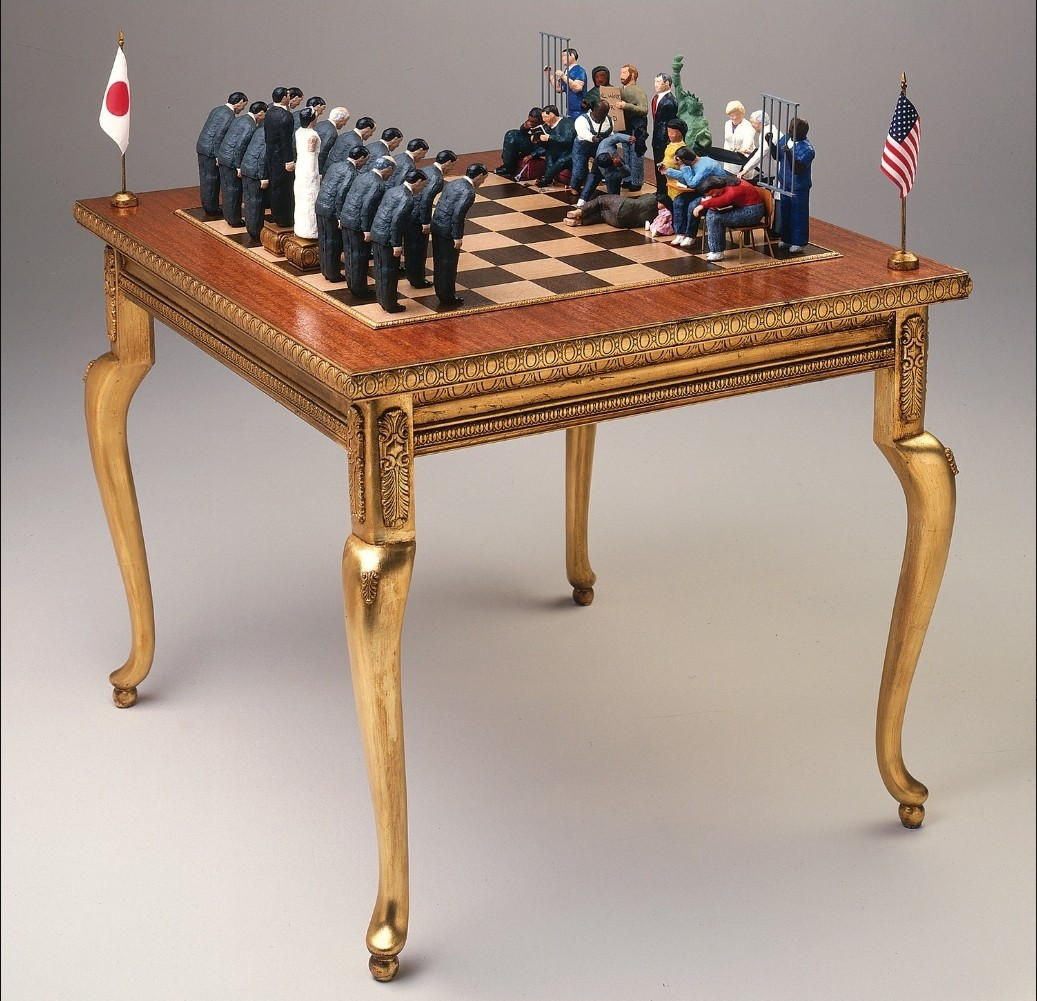
"Checkmate," by Ed Massey

Massey's sculptures have appeared in print media including in The Wall Street Journal, and Fortune Magazine.

The Wedding Dress (1998) was created for Massey's bride, Dawn Harris, a 200 lb (91 kg) sculpted dress with a five-foot train and 1,060 roses draped on a steel mesh form. The Los Angeles Times called it "wildly romantic"; and is displayed at the Skirball Cultural Center.

Corporate Ladder (1990), a 19 1/2 foot creation displayed in Columbia, Maryland, seeks to confront the inequities within company cultures. Stereotypical corporate employees were sculpted aggressively scaling the corporate ladder, or "greasy pole". A successful white male is precariously perched atop the ladder at the expense of minorities, including women clambering to break through the proverbial glass-ceiling. The exhibit drew much disagreement as to what it takes to get to the top with some arguing it was "a slap in the face to businesses". The Wall Street Journal noted that “They could give some thought to installing it (Corporate Ladder) bottom end up.”

Checkmate (1992), a.k.a. Ōte in Japanese, continued Massey's social critiques. Sculpted on a gilded chessboard, on one side are disparate Americans including lazy students, a jobless man, in-fighting employees, and scrambling scientists who are "losing to the disciplined and homogeneous Japanese," posed as the opposing threat. A stereotypical sentiment of the era, Massey's creation moved the dialog needle forward in a Tokyo Broadcast System 2-Part Special.

Morality/Mortality (1994) is a controversial sculpture offering a graphic window into rape. This was Massey's first national campaign exhibition. A simultaneous, 5-city showing, Morality/Mortality garnered national headlines, affecting traffic on street-corners in Los Angeles, Chicago, New York, Washington DC, and Miami. Each installation included a confrontational artist's note, “The frequent and undeniable horror of sexual assault dictates that the sculpture be exhibited boldly, forthrightly and without apology. ... Few people outside law enforcement officers ever see the immediate aftermath of a sexual assault.” The Los Angeles Times captioned Morality/Mortality, “A Public Forum for a Private Horror.” Los Angeles Times' Suzanne Muchnic editorialized, "Artist Ed Massey and feminist activist Peg Yorkin have joined forces to provoke a coast-to-coast discussion," and "Massey is a veteran of socially critical art."

In the Image (2019) is a 7-foot sculpture of a homeless man draped in baggy clothes that was displayed in Santa Monica, California. The statue is for the public to, "contemplate their view and elevate their discourse on the issue." John Phillips of KABC/AM790 editorialized in the Los Angeles Daily News that, "The sculpture is actually the perfect monument to the "slactivism" exhibited by our local leaders."

=== Paintings ===
Syncopation (2004) is a 7,500 square foot, 11-section mural that beautified the Culver City Gateway community outside of Sony Pictures Studios and Kirk Douglas Theater in Los Angeles, California from 2004 to 2012. Called a “signature visual landmark” by The San Francisco Gate, Syncopation was created using mops as paintbrushes. When the mural was scheduled for demolition by property redevelopment, the Westside Neighborhood School won the bid to carefully relocate the mural to their new educational facility in Del Rey, California.

Inertia in Motion on Sunset Boulevard (2011) injects color and dimension to the Chabad-Lubavitch Community Center. Located in Pacific Palisades, California, Massey's 120 foot-long mural adorns the building's entrance. The San Francisco Chronicle said the mural “unleash[es] a new hip look” to the former Getty-Trust property, “a colorburst on the Sunset Boulevard façade to greet drivers, joggers, walkers, and Chabad visitors.”

=== Portraits of Hope ===
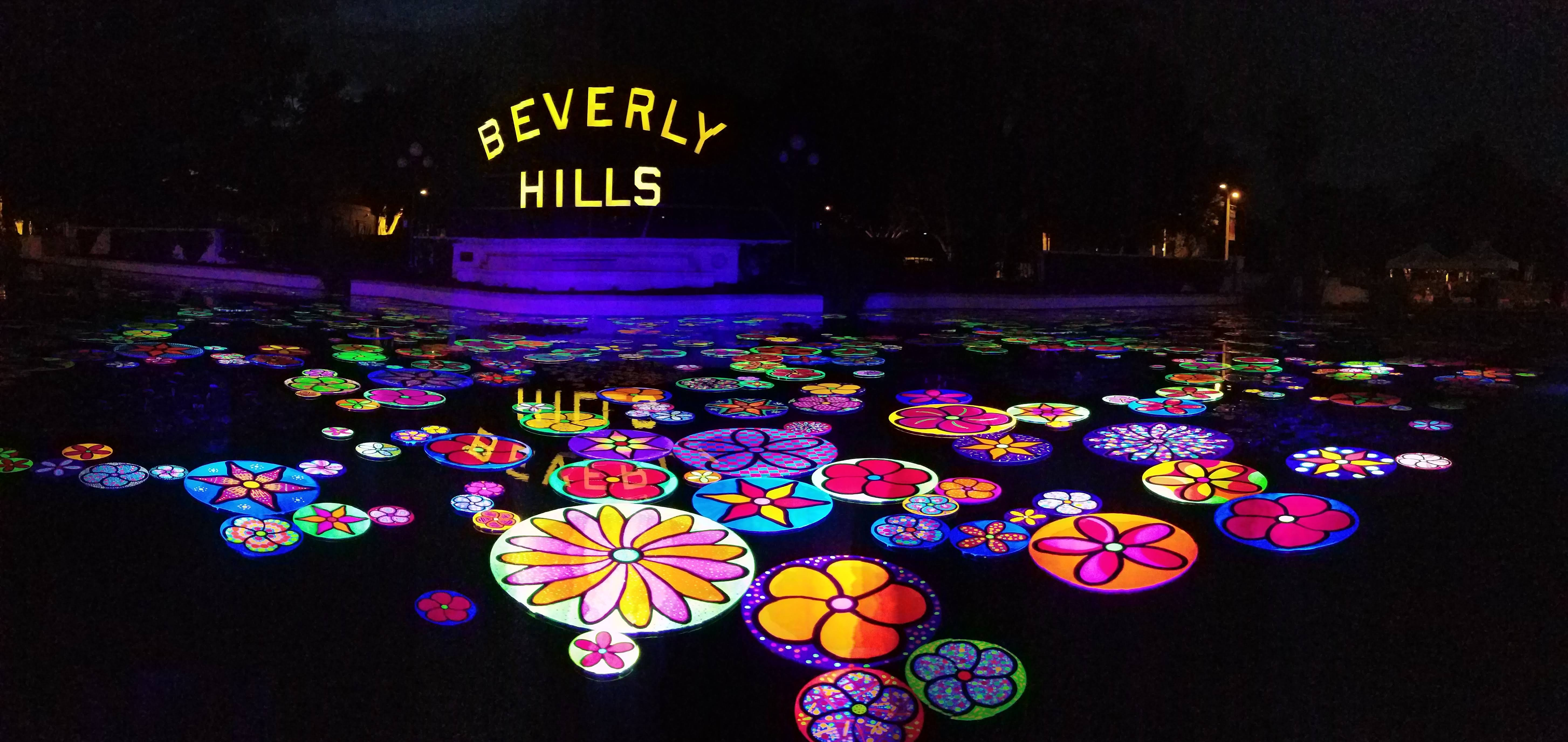
Portraits of Hope's "Neon Nights in 3D" at the Lily Pond in Beverly Hills, CA (by Ed Massey)

Portraits of Hope (POH) (1995), co-founded by the Massey brothers, began as a volunteer-driven, non-profit, creative art-therapy program for children in pediatric facilities. A collaborative effort for social good, Portraits of Hope started with hospital visits and grew to an ongoing, large-scale, social-art experience.

Portraits of Hope has completed over 15 projects including 1997's Tower of Hope and Summer of Color. 2019 projects include the Didi Hirsch Suicide Prevention Center mural for a suicide crisis facility, and Shaping LA.

Massey holds several patented and/or patent-pending art brushes developed to enable painting for children who have difficulty using a hand-held paintbrush.

Massey's 1995 children's book, Milton, deals with youthful imagination and creativity. This book, along with his second publication, Jedlo: Defender of the Deep, were the impetuses for Portraits of Hope.

== Personal life ==
In 1998 Massey married Dawn Harris. The couple have two children.

== See also ==
- Garden in Transit
