= Patriot Games (event) =

2026 American sporting event

President Trump in the 2026 Patriot Games

The Patriot Games was a sporting event founded by the Trump administration, held from August 9 to August 11, 2026. Each US state and territory sent one male and female high school student to compete in the games. The Patriot Games was first announced in July 2025.

== Planning ==
The Patriot Games was a sporting event founded by President Donald Trump in his second term, and was first announced in July 2025. President Donald Trump announced plans for the event on December 18, 2025, in a video published by Freedom 250. Trump stated in his announcement that he would not let transgender athletes compete. The event was initially planned to be held in Washington D.C., but, in July 2026, the event was moved to SPIRE Academy in Geneva, Ohio.

The games were a part of the United States' Semiquincentennial celebrations, with the games hosted by the Freedom 250 from August 9 through August 11, 2026. The prize for each winner was $125,000 in scholarships. Each state and territory were to send one male student and one female student selected by The Patriot Games to compete.

== The games ==
The event included skills initially tested by the Presidential Fitness Test, a military-esque boot camp course, and an obstacle course.

All participants were between the ages of 14 and 17 and were United States citizens or legal residents. Several selected participants represented states that they do not live in, and the body of selected participants as a whole was described by CNN as "overwhelmingly white" with many participants coming from Christian schools. Transgender athletes were forbidden to compete.

The event was broadcast live on ESPN networks and streamed on ESPN+.

On August 13th 2026, a one-hour highlights program on ABC drew in 1.21 million viewers, losing the 9pm hour in the ratings to encore episodes of Georgie & Mandy's First Marriage on CBS, Best Medicine on Fox, and The Americas on NBC.

Kennadi Fuhrman, a competitor from Kansas, won the female category and Rockwell Myers, a competitor from Utah, won the male category.

== Response ==
Eric Cannon, writing for the Indiana Daily Student, compared the event to a Nickelodeon Kids' Choice Awards event. Governor Jeff Landry asked students in his state of Louisiana to apply.

The X account for the Democratic Party quoted The Hunger Games: "And so it was decreed that, each year, the various districts of Panem would offer up, in tribute, one young man and woman to fight to the death in a pageant of honor, courage and sacrifice." (The Hunger Games, 2012)" Saturday Night Live made a similar comparison to that of the Democratic Party.

Writing for The Guardian after the event concluded, Adam Gabbatt summarized the games as "something which allowed a vainglorious president to put himself front and center of something which was supposed to be a celebrating of the country".
