= Trace Sport Stars =

Television channel

Trace Sports HD
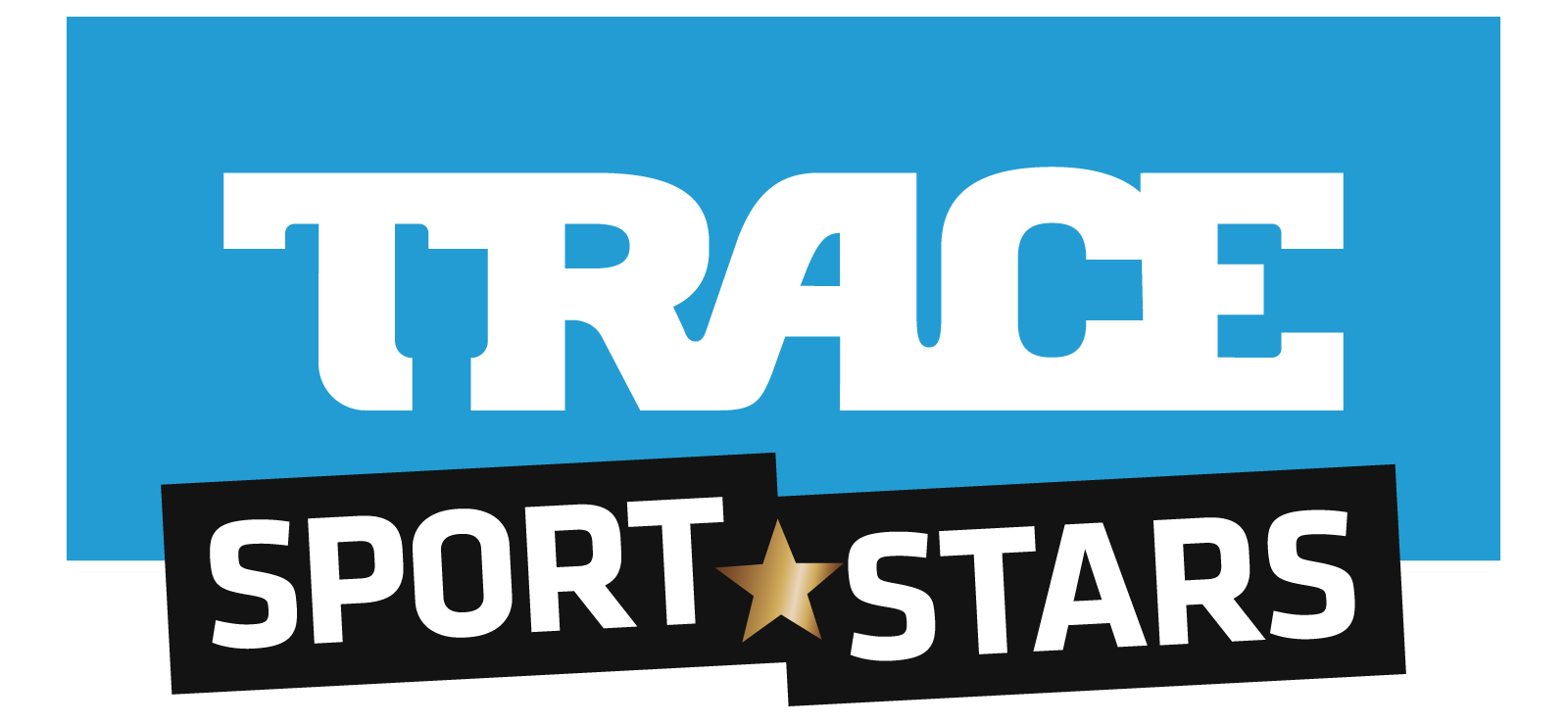
- Broadcast area: Worldwide

Programming
- Picture format: 1080i HDTV

History
- Launched: 3 August 2010

Trace Sports or Trace Sport Stars is a global entertainment television channel about the lives of sports stars.

The channel can be viewed on streaming platforms such as Binge Networks.
