= Silvina Moschini =

Argentine entrepreneur (born 1972)

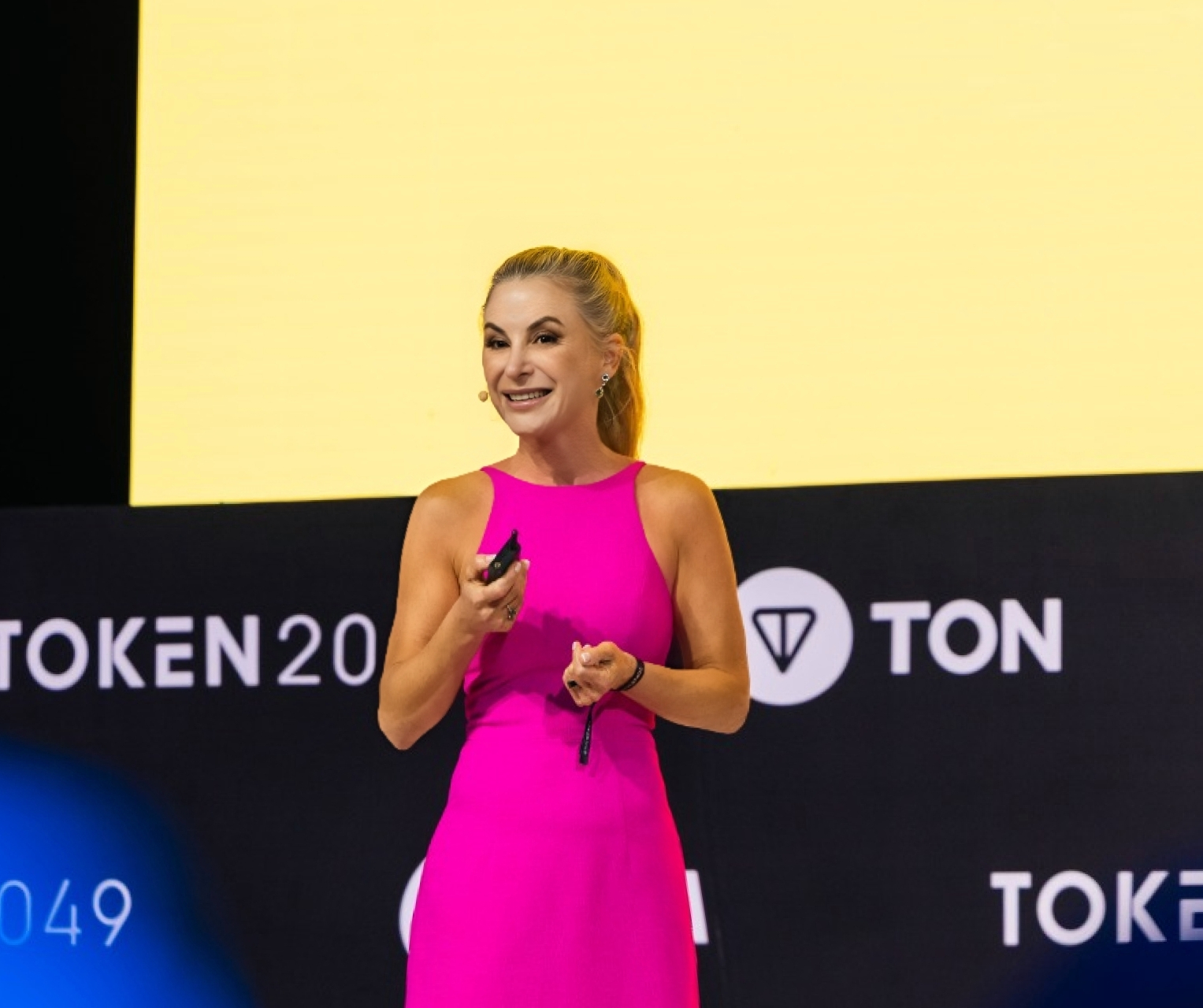
- Born: 1972 (age 53–54); Azul, Argentina
- Occupations: CEO: Unicorns Inc. President: TransparentBusiness; Founder: Unicoin; Producer: Unicorn Hunters; Founder: SheWorks!
- Spouse: Alex Konanykhin
- Website: silvinamoschini.com

Silvina Moschini (born 1972) is an Argentine entrepreneur and investor. She is co-founder and chief strategy officer of Unicoin, a public reporting company, and CEO of Unicorns Inc. She is also a producer for the investment reality series Unicorn Hunters.

== Early life and education ==
Moschini was born in Azul, Argentina. She holds a BA in public relations from Universidad Argentina de la Empresa, a degree in marketing from New York University, and a master’s degree in public relations from the University of Houston. She also studied management and social networking web communications at the Libera Università di Lingue e Comunicazione and the Università Commerciale Luigi Bocconi.

== Career ==
Moschini’s career began in the corporate sector. She led the Latin American public relations department of Compaq, held positions at Patagon.com and Grupo Santander Central Hispano before becoming vice president of corporate communications for Visa International. Moschini then co-founded TransparentBusiness, a platform for managing remote teams. In 2020, the company reached a valuation of US$1 billion. According to the BBC, this made her the first Latin American woman to lead a company to unicorn status.

=== Unicorn Hunters ===
Moschini launched Unicorn Hunters, serving as executive producer and panelist. Unicorn Hunters debuted in 2021 as a reality television series where experts stress-test entrepreneurs to evaluate companies, aiming to democratize access to wealth.

The judging panel has included Steve Wozniak, Moe Vela, Lance Bass, Alex Konanykhin, Scott Livingston, and Rosie Rios, alongside Moschini.

=== Unicoin ===
In 2022, Moschini co-founded Unicoin, a digital asset company.

== Personal life ==
Moschini has advocated for the potential of tokenization and Web3 technologies to reduce the gender investment gap and foster financial autonomy. In 2025 she created Unicoin Women, a program providing educational content, community support, and investment guidance for women.

== Recognition ==
In 2019 SheWorks!, a company founded by Moschini, received the EQUALS In Tech Award in the leadership category, the global initiative of the United Nations. In 2020 she was named a Woman of the Decade by the Women Economic Forum and received a Women in Tech Lifetime Achievement Award from Women in Tech. In 2023 she was named to the Latina Powerhouse Top 100 list, by Hola! USA.
