= Noosheen Hashemi =

American technology executive and philanthropist

Noosheen Hashemi is an Iranian-born American entrepreneur, philanthropist, and the founder and CEO of January.ai, a health company based in Menlo Park, California. She was previously vice president of finance and administration at Oracle Corporation.

== Early life and education ==
Noosheen Hashemi was born in Pahlavi Iran (now Iran) in 1963. Hashemi immigrated to the United States as a teenager in 1977.

She earned a Bachelor of Science degree in economics from San Jose State University in 1984, and a Master of Science degree in management from Stanford University in 1993.

== Career ==
Early in her career, Hashemi joined Oracle Corporation, ascending to the position of vice president of finance and administration. Subsequently, Hashemi ventured into entrepreneurship and philanthropy, founding January.ai, a company using machine learning to advance preventive healthcare, particularly for individuals on the diabetes spectrum.

Hashemi is also president and co-founder of the Hand Foundation, focusing on philanthropic efforts that address the needs of the vulnerable and disenfranchised.

In 2010, she was recognized with the Carnegie Corporation Great Immigrants Award. In 2011, she was the recipient of the United Nations Convention on the Elimination of All Forms of Discrimination Against Women (CEDAW) Human Rights Award for Philanthropy

== Personal life ==
She is married to Farzad Nazem, former chief technology officer of Yahoo!. Together they have two children.
