= Moises Vela =

American attorney and political advisor

Moe Vela
- Born: Moises V. Vela Jr. Harlingen, Texas, U.S.
- Education: University of Texas at Austin (BA); St. Mary's University School of Law (JD)
- Occupations: Attorney, political advisor
- Relatives: Filemon Vela Sr. (uncle)

Moises V. "Moe" Vela Jr. is an American attorney and political advisor. Vela is the CEO and president of The Vela Group, LLC, a global business development consulting firm based in Washington, D.C. He is also of counsel at the law firm of Stein Mitchell Beato & Missner.

Vela is the first Hispanic to serve in two senior executive roles in the White House, first during the Clinton administration as Chief Financial Officer and Senior Advisor for Latino Affairs in the Office of Vice President Al Gore, and later during the Obama administration as Director of Administration for Vice President Joe Biden.

== Early life and education ==
Vela is a native of Harlingen, Texas, graduating from Harlingen High School in 1980. His father, Moises Vela, was a Cameron County judge, and his uncle, Filemon Vela Sr., was a judge on the United States District Court for the Southern District of Texas. Vela is a graduate of the University of Texas at Austin and St. Mary's University School of Law.

Vela is gay.

== Political career ==
In 1993, President Bill Clinton appointed Vela to the U.S. Department of Agriculture as an assistant to the administrator of the Agricultural Marketing Service. While there, Vela advanced the department's employee diversity recruitment program. In 1996 he took on the position of chief financial officer and senior policy advisor/coordinator of Hispanic outreach activities at the Office of the Vice President.

During the Obama administration, Vela was named the Director of Administration for Vice President Joe Biden. He became the first openly gay person and the first Hispanic-American to serve twice in the White House in a senior role.

== Advocacy career ==
After serving on the staff of Vice President Al Gore, Vela helped launch a cyberspace company, later creating the consulting company "Diverse Directions," supporting the development of Latino marketing strategies and community outreach. In 2001 he was hired as the head of Strategia Hispanic Marketing.

In 2004 he began work as a housing advocate. Vela also created the El Centro Legal Latino in Birmingham, Alabama, which educates members of the Southeastern United States United States Latino community on their legal rights. He also founded and served as first chair of the Alabama Hispanic Chamber of Congress. Vela also served as executive director of the "National Association of Hispanic Real Estate Professionals," an organization that includes over 12,000 members from 48 states. He later served as senior vice president of Multicultural Strategies at United Dominion Realty Trust, and then president of his own consulting business, Comunidades LLC.

Vela has worked as a staff member in the Texas House of Representatives, serving as committee clerk and legislative director for Representative René Oliveira, and then committee clerk for Senator Eddie Bernice Johnson, working to support the Interim Committee on Minority and Women Business Ownership Opportunities.

After his second stint with the White House, Vela worked as a partner in the Public Policy & Regulation Group of Holland & Knight. He also began work as a lobbyist until 2017, when he took on the role of president and CEO of MoeVela LLC. He is now a board member of and the chief transparency officer for TransparentBusiness. In April 2021, Vela became a panelist for the new TV series Unicorn Hunters, a business investment show from the makers of the series The Masked Singer. In November 2022, Vela joined the board of Easy Energy Systems Inc, in a senior advisor role.

== Professional awards and honors ==
Recognition for Vela has included being named to the Top 100 Most Influential People for Hispanics in the Nation's Capitol by El Tiempo Latino in 2017; one of the Top 101 Latino Leaders by Latino Leaders Magazine in both 2010 and 2011; one of the Top 300 Washington, D.C. Insiders by National Journal in 2010, and one of the Top 100 Hispanics in America by Hispanic Business in 2009.
