= Westside Neighborhood School =

Coordinates: 33.977659°N 118.425154°W

- Los Angeles, California; United States

Information
- Type: Preschool, Elementary School, Middle School, Co-ed, Nonprofit
- Motto: Leading with Purpose. Learning with Heart.
- Established: 1980
- Head of School: Brad Zacuto
- Enrollment: 650
- Student to teacher ratio: 7:1 Early Childhood Center, 9:1 Kindergarten, 13:1 1st - 8th
- Website: https://wns-la.org/

Westside Neighborhood School is a private independent school in Los Angeles, California. Founded in 1980, the school operates preschool, elementary school, and middle school grades (PS-8).

WNS is notable for a program of "Family Groups," collections of students from all grades who meet several times a year during school hours to work as a team on projects such as dramatic programs, organizing school functions, and work on community service projects. These joint efforts unite the students into a community unlimited by age and grade levels. Students stay in the same Family Group as long as they attend WNS, eventually leading their groups in their graduation years.

Through the school year ending in 2005, WNS was Westchester Neighborhood School, located in south Westchester directly under the final approaches of aircraft landing at Los Angeles International Airport (LAX), hence the "Jets" nickname used by the school's athletic teams. In September 2005 classes resumed in a vastly improved 50,000-square-foot (4,600 m^{2}) facility in Playa Vista. WNS added a second building to its campus in 2010 featuring additional space for performing arts, Spanish, and choral music. The school's third campus building will provide 26,000 additional square feet will instructional space for the preschool, a full-sized gymnasium, and middle school STEAM Academic Complex.

== New campus at 5340 Alla Road ==
In 2025, the school announced the acquisition of a new campus building at 5340 Alla Road, sitting on 5 acres of land in Playa Vista, which would become the permanent home to the school's DK-8th grade students. WNS opened the doors to 5340 Alla Road on September 4, 2026, with a ribbon cutting and community celebration.

The acquisition and transformation of the new campus building represented an approximate $90M investment, funded by tax-exempt bonds.

The campus includes an athletic complex with soccer field, basketball courts, golf simulator, and gymnasium, along with technology centers including a robotics suite, digital art studio, and a Fabrication Lab (FabLab).
