= Rosa Gumataotao Rios =

American politician (born 1965)

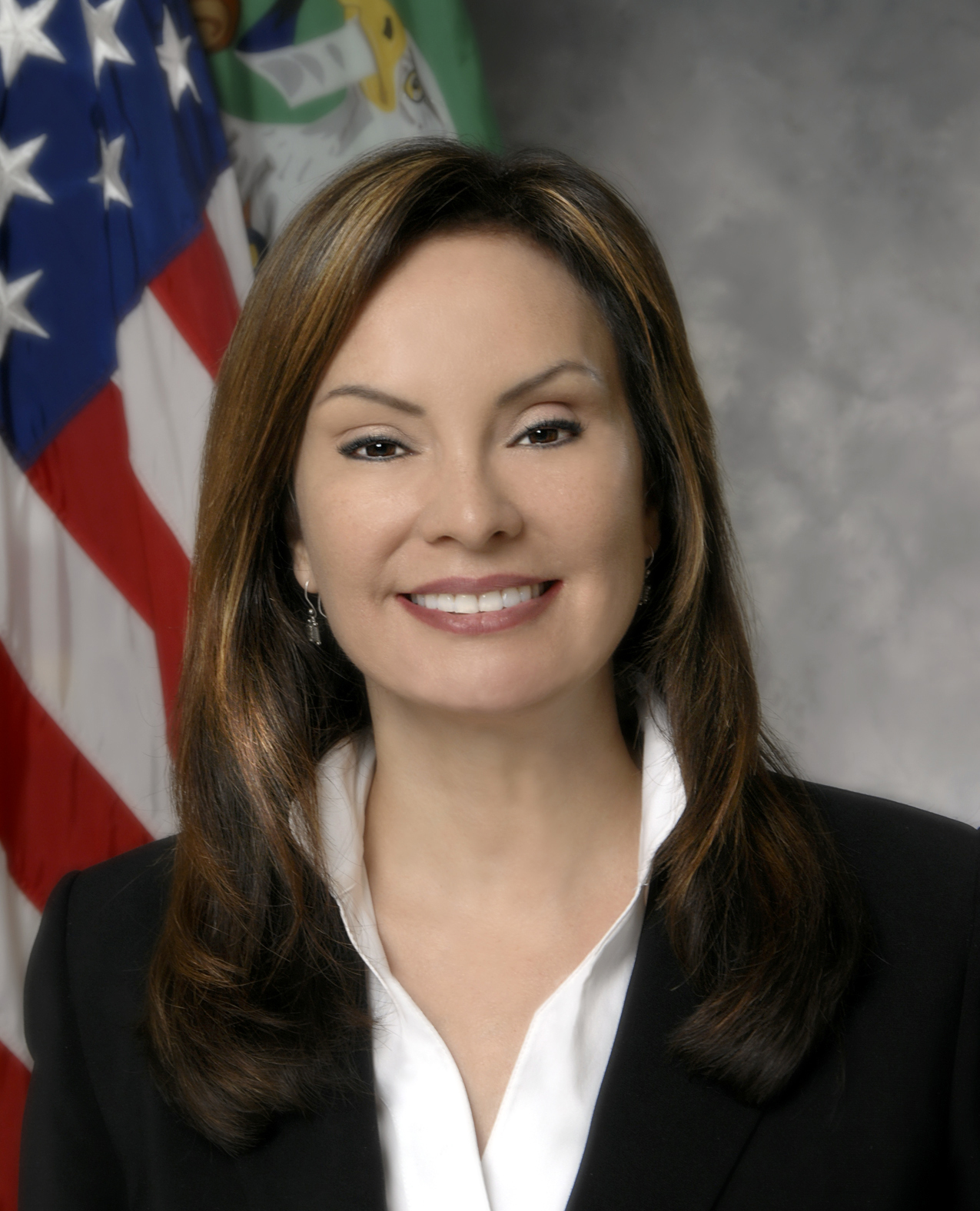
- Official portrait, 2009

Chairwoman of the United States Semiquincentennial Commission
- Incumbent
- Assumed office 2022
- Appointed by: Joe Biden
- Preceded by: Dan DiLella

43rd Treasurer of the United States
- In office August 6, 2009 – July 11, 2016
- President: Barack Obama
- Preceded by: Anna Escobedo Cabral
- Succeeded by: Jovita Carranza

Personal details
- Born: Rosa Rios; July 17, 1965 (age 61) Hayward, California, U.S.
- Party: Democratic
- Spouse: Joe Gumataotao
- Children: 2
- Education: Harvard University

Rosa Gumataotao Rios (born July 17, 1965) is a Mexican-American business leader who served as the 43rd Treasurer of the United States from 2009 to 2016, and was a visiting scholar at the Radcliffe Institute for Advanced Study at Harvard University in the late 2010s. In 2022, Joe Biden appointed her as the chairwoman of the United States Semiquincentennial Commission.

== Early life and education ==
Rios was born the sixth of nine children in Hayward, California. Her father, who was from Mexico, was a seasonal migrant worker at the Hunt's tomato factory. Rios' mother, also an immigrant from Mexico, raised all nine children on her own and with the support of their church, sent all of her children to Catholic schools and off to college. All nine children worked at a young age. Rios worked beginning in her freshman year of high school at the office headquarters for the Alameda County Library System. Rios stated that she "had won the lottery with this job" as she had access to any book she ever wanted to read and that her experience and reading during this period led in part to her acceptance to Harvard University. Of working as a student in the Harvard libraries, she reported, "To go from the county library in my hometown of Hayward to Widener Library was like winning the lottery.”

Rios went to Saint Clement and Rios soon graduated from Moreau Catholic High School in 1983. She attended Harvard, and graduated in 1987 with high honors. with a double major in Sociology and Romance Languages and Literatures. She received the Dean's Award as the founder of Cultural Rhythms and is one of the few U.S. recipients of the Silver Medal Award from the Royal Society of Arts in Britain. Rios was hired by General Reinsurance Corporation as a Commercial Property Underwriter to analyze the risks of commercial investments.

== Public career ==
Rios was hired in 1994 by the City of San Leandro as a development specialist. She developed strong roots in business and government in Northern California and became an expert in economic development and redevelopment for the cities of Union City, and Fremont before moving on to Oakland in 2003 as the director of redevelopment and economic development for the City of Oakland. She has been a member, then chair, of the U.S. Semiquincentennial Commission since 2016.

== Consulting career ==
In 2003, Rios became a principal partner at Red River Associates, a consulting firm specializing in economic development and project management. While at Red River, she teamed with the assistant general manager of infrastructure to restructure the San Francisco Public Utilities Commission in preparation for the seismic retrofit of the Hetch Hetchy water system, one of the nation's largest capital improvement programs.

Robert Bobb, who at that time was serving as the city administrator for Washington DC, recruited Rios to assist with the recruitment of the Montreal Expos to become the Washington Nationals in 2005 including the revitalization of the Anacostia River waterfront. The following year, Rios became managing director of investments for MacFarlane Partners, a real estate investment firm based in San Francisco. While there, she was responsible for the firm's urban investment and development programs throughout Northern California and consulting with local municipalities.

In 2008, Rios was invited to collaborate in the efforts of the Obama campaign to secure the state of Virginia in the 2008 presidential elections. She developed a strategy using the fan base of the DC United soccer team to register Latinos in Virginia. Many have said that this was a key tipping point necessary for the victory of then-Senator Barack Obama to win the democratic vote for the first time since 1964 in his campaign to become the president of the United States. Rios was asked to be one of 23 finance professionals to join the Treasury-Federal Reserve transition team during the 2008 financial crisis.

== Treasurer of the United States ==
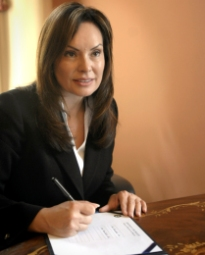
Treasurer Rios signs her name officially at her swearing-in ceremony

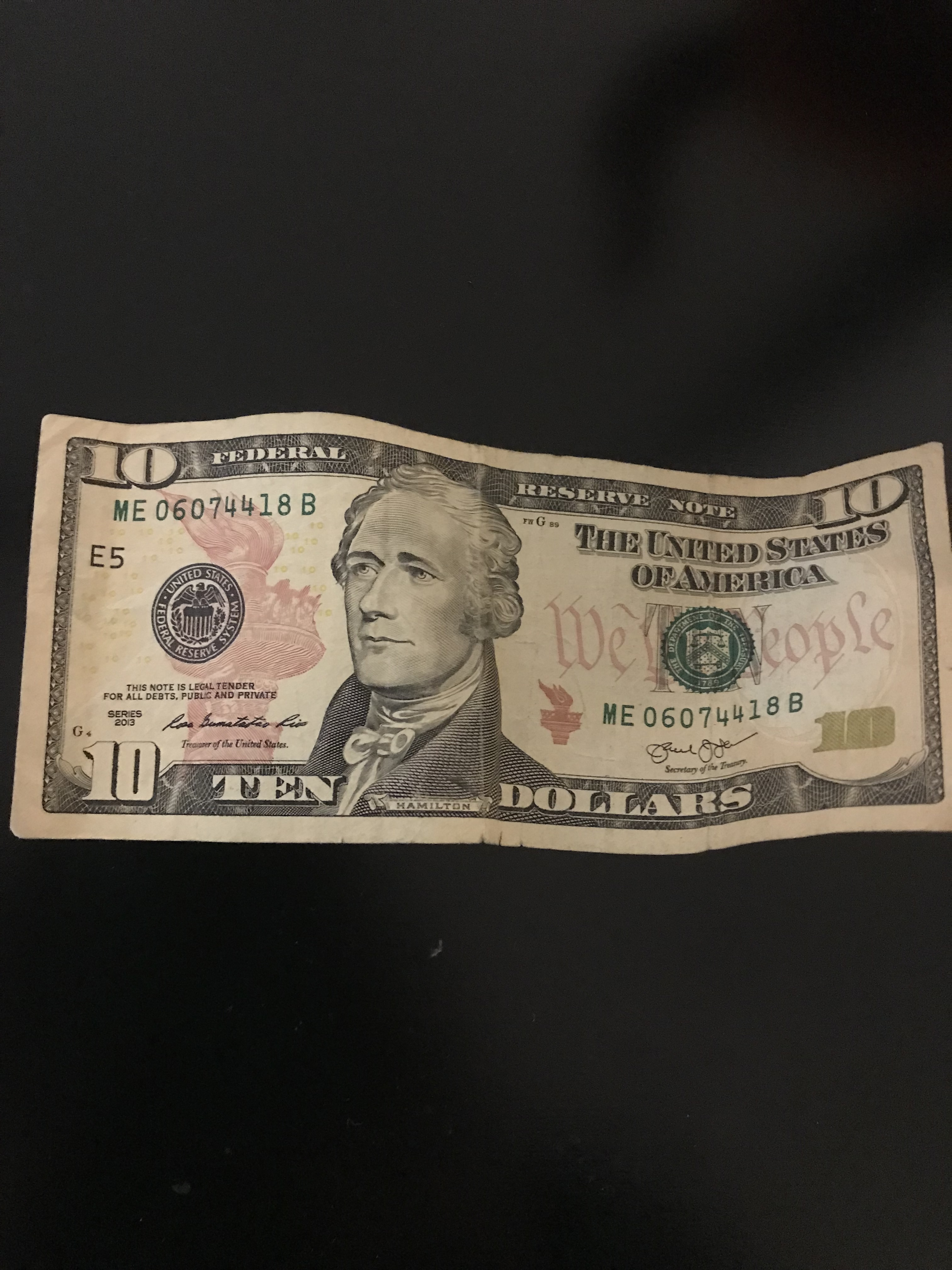
A United States ten-dollar bill with the signature of Rios.

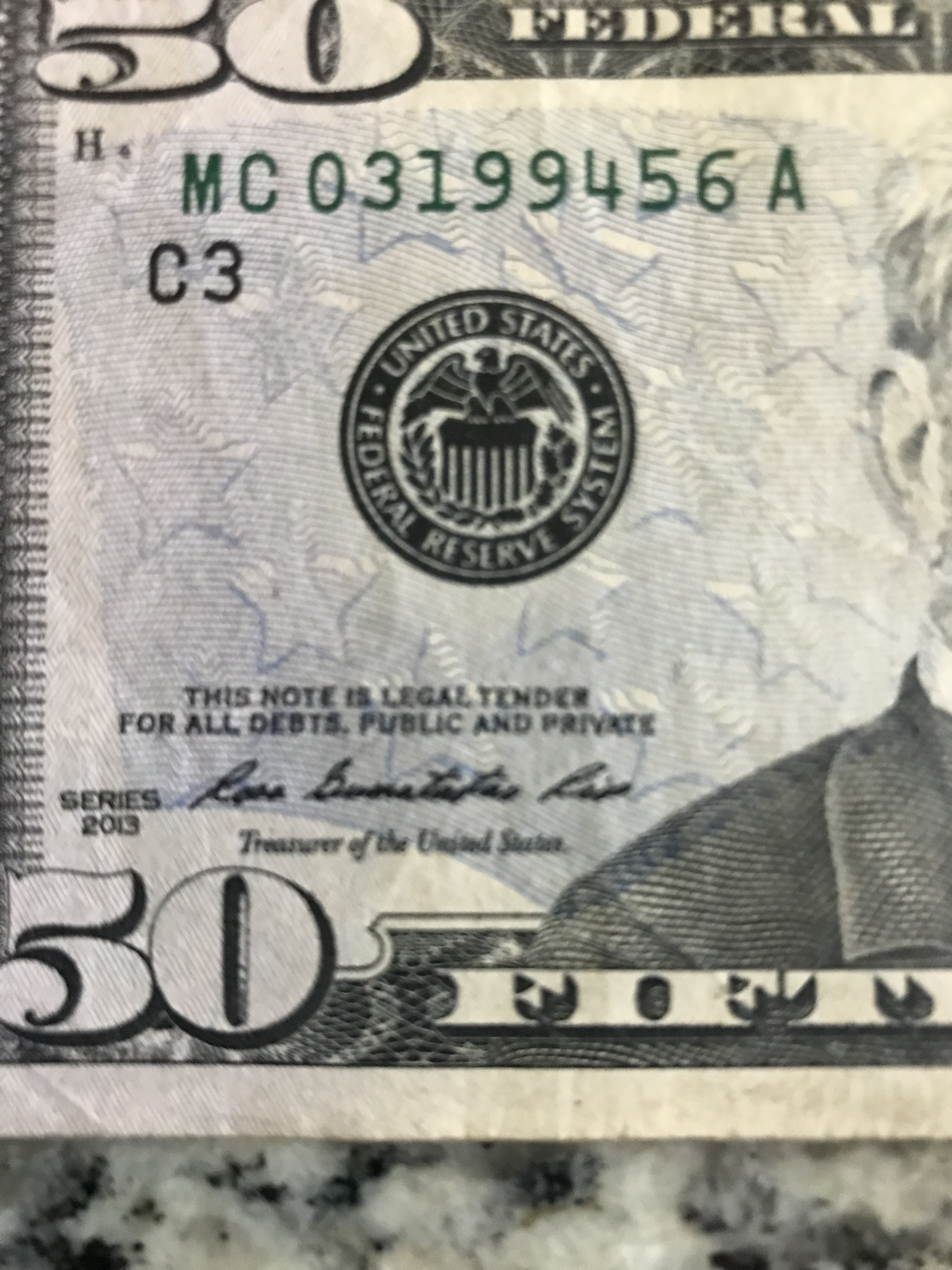
A close-up of the signature of Rios on a United States fifty-dollar bill.

On May 18, 2009, President Obama nominated Rios to be Treasurer of the United States and was confirmed by the Senate unanimously on July 24, 2009. Rios was sworn in on August 20, 2009. Her signature was initially taken on her first day of the job (August 6), and first appeared on US paper currency the day after Thanksgiving 2009. Rios was also a part of the team that implemented the American Recovery and Reinvestment Act with an emphasis on the Build America Bonds (BAB) program. Rios convened and trained state and local government officials and other stakeholders on how to access and utilize Build America Bonds to fund major infrastructure projects during the economic recovery. Rios was the chief executive officer of the Bureau of Engraving and Printing and the United States Mint. She oversaw all currency and coin production activities. Rios was the first treasurer to have her portfolio which also included the chair of the Advanced Counterfeiting Deterrence Steering Committee and Senior Advisor to the Secretary of the Treasury in the areas of community development and public engagement. Her signature currently appeared on $1.2 trillion out of the $1.4 trillion in circulation worldwide when she stepped aside.

Her almost eight-year effort to redesign the nation's currency included the first-ever nationwide public engagement process in the history of the federal government using a social media portal, roundtables and town halls. Rios began pushing for the change soon after she joined the Obama administration in 2009. Her presentation to then-Treasury secretary Tim Geithner went so well, she told CNN afterwards, that she left the room convinced the cause was sailing forward. Rios stepped down as treasurer; her last day in office was July 11, 2016. Rios was the longest-serving Senate-confirmed Treasury official beginning with her time on the Treasury/Federal Reserve Transition Team in November 2008 during the 2008 financial crisis.

== Later career ==
After the end of her tenure at Treasury, Rios launched an organization called Empowerment 2020 at the Radcliffe Institute for Advanced Study, where she was working as a visiting scholar. In November 2020, Rios was named a volunteer member of the Joe Biden presidential transition Agency Review Team to support transition efforts related to the United States Department of Treasury. In May 2021, Rios joined the board of directors at Ripple Labs. That year she also joined the cast of judges/investors on the streaming series Unicorn Hunters, where entrepreneurs pitch investing in their businesses and the audience at home can also choose to invest alongside the judges. Fellow judges on the show include Lance Bass and Steve Wozniak.

On January 11, 2018, Rios was named a commissioner of the United States Semiquincentennial Commission. She was appointed chair of the commission by President Joe Biden in July 2022, succeeding Dan DiLella.

== Awards and honors ==
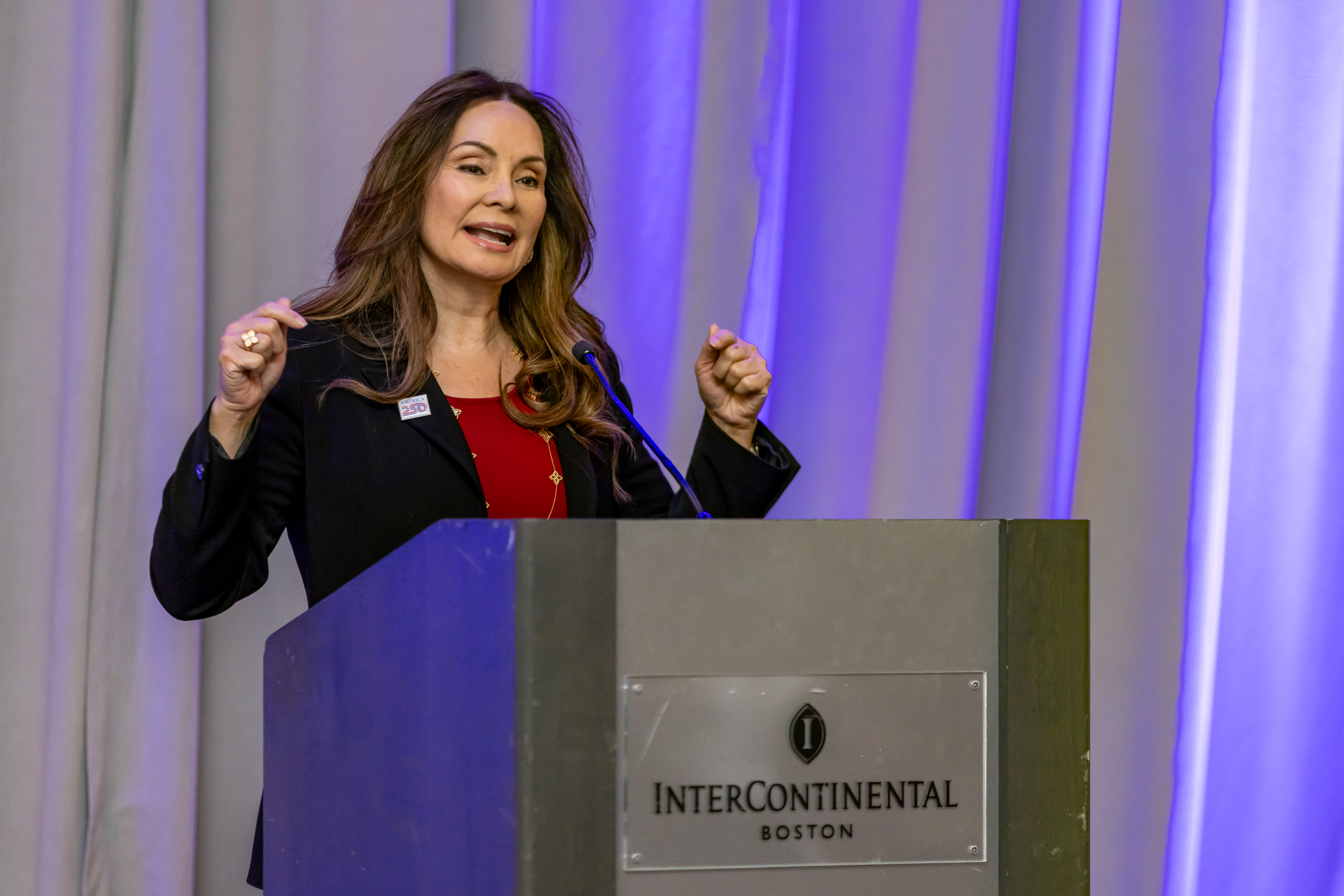
Rios in 2023

Upon her resignation in 2016, Rios received the Hamilton Award, the highest honor bestowed in the U.S. Department of the Treasury. In April 2015, a portrait of Rios was unveiled at Winthrop House at Harvard University, where she lived as an undergraduate—the first portrait of a Hispanic female to hang on a wall in Harvard College. Rios was inducted into the Maryland Women's Hall of Fame in 2019. In 2020 she was named among Maryland's "Women of the Century" by USAToday.

On June 25, 2025, she was presented with a Certificate of Appreciation by President General Pamela Rouse Wright of the Daughters of the American Revolution for her service on the Semiquincentennial Commission.

== Personal life ==
Rios has two children, Joey and Brooke.

Political offices
Preceded by Anna Escobedo Cabral	Treasurer of the United States; 2009–2016	Succeeded by Jovita Carranza
