= 2026 State of the Union Address =

Speech by US president Donald Trump

- Full video of the speech as published by the White House
- Date: February 24, 2026
- Time: 9:12 p.m. EST
- Duration: 1 hour, 47 minutes, 40 seconds
- Venue: House Chamber, United States Capitol
- Location: Washington, D.C.; 38°53′19.8″N 77°00′32.8″W
- Type: State of the Union address
- Participants: Donald Trump; JD Vance; Mike Johnson
- Footage: C-SPAN
- Previous: 2025 joint session speech

2026 State of the Union Address
Donald Trump delivers his sixth State of the Union address on February 24, 2026.

Donald Trump, the 47th president of the United States, delivered a State of the Union address on February 24, 2026, at 9:12 p.m. EST, in the chamber of the United States House of Representatives to the 119th United States Congress. It was Trump's first State of the Union address and his second speech to a joint session of the United States Congress in his second term. Overall, it was Trump's fourth State of the Union Address and sixth speech to a joint session of the United States Congress. Presiding over this joint session was House Speaker Mike Johnson, accompanied by Vice President JD Vance, in his capacity as the president of the Senate.

Lasting 1 hour, 47 minutes, and 40 seconds, it was the longest State of the Union address in American history, surpassing Bill Clinton's 2000 speech by 20 minutes. It is also the longest speech to ever be given before a joint session of Congress, surpassing Trump's own previous record from the year prior. The address drew an audience of 32.6 million viewers, down from the 36.6 million who watched Trump's 2025 speech to a joint session of Congress.

== Background ==
The United States Constitution requires that the president of the United States "from time to time give to the Congress information of the state of the union". The State of the Union address is traditionally delivered as a speech, usually between January 3 and February 2. President Donald Trump, who was elected in the 2024 presidential election, previously addressed a joint session of the United States Congress in March 2025; the speech was not considered a State of the Union address.

=== Topics of context leading up to the address ===
On February 20, four days before the address, the Supreme Court ruled in Learning Resources, Inc. v. Trump that President Trump exceeded his authority in imposing tariffs on products entering the United States under the International Emergency Economic Powers Act, a 1977 federal law. The ruling invalidated many, but not all of the enacted tariffs. In response, Trump announced a day after the ruling via Truth Social that he would increase global tariffs to 15%.

The 2026 Iran–United States crisis shadowed prior to the address, as President Trump weighed military options, including advice from general Dan Caine that a sustained campaign with Iran would turn into a drawn-out engagement requiring additional American troops and resources. Beginning in January 2026, the United States began amassing air and naval assets in the region at a level not seen since the outset of the 2003 invasion of Iraq.

The address took place during the aftermath of files released following the signing of the Epstein Files Transparency Act, where Attorney General Pam Bondi was criticized on February 15 for stating all files had been released.

The address was also held during a partial government shutdown surrounding the Department of Homeland Security that began on February 14, 2026. Prior to the address, the Department of Homeland Security announced on February 22 they would suspend TSA PreCheck and Global Entry as a result of the shutdown. The suspension of TSA PreCheck was reversed hours later. However, it was also announced later the same day that courtesy escorts at airports and non-disaster responses from FEMA had been suspended.

== Planning ==
=== Invitation and preparation ===
On January 7, 2026, speaker of the House Mike Johnson formally invited president Donald Trump to deliver a State of the Union address on February 24. The speech was set to be delivered amid an impending partial government shutdown affecting the Department of Homeland Security. According to Politico, some Republicans and officials within the Trump administration expressed concern that the shutdown would evoke a weak image from Republicans. Hours before the address was set to begin, the White House's YouTube channel started a livestream with Trump's previous speeches as president, including his inaugural address, his speech to a joint session of Congress, and his commencement speech at the University of Alabama.

=== Speechwriting ===
The State of the Union address was primarily written by Ross Worthington, the White House director of speechwriting, with assistance from Susie Wiles, the White House chief of staff; Stephen Miller, the White House deputy chief of staff for policy; Karoline Leavitt, the White House press secretary; Steven Cheung, the White House director of communications; and Vince Haley, the director of the Domestic Policy Council. Prior to the address, Trump stated that it would be a "long speech, because we have so much to talk about".

=== Designated survivors ===
Secretary of Veterans Affairs Doug Collins was again named the Republican government designated survivor. House minority leader Hakeem Jeffries appointed California representative Mike Thompson as the Democratic designated survivor, marking the sixth consecutive time that he had been named as such.

== Address ==
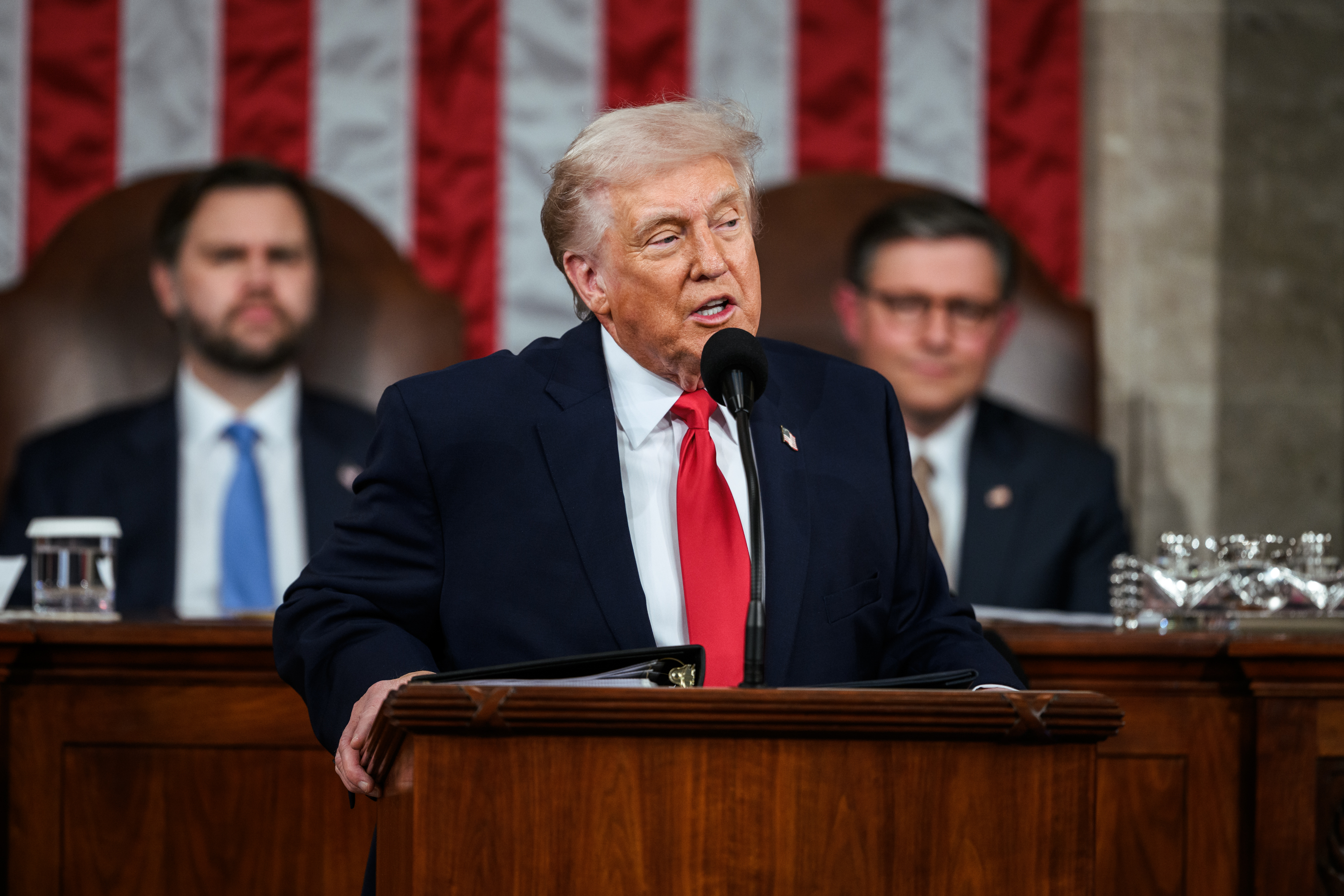
President Donald Trump delivers the address, with Vice President JD Vance and House Speaker Mike Johnson behind him.

Trump started delivering his State of the Union address at 9:12 p.m. EST on February 24, 2026. His speech began by covering the economy. Trump introduced the United States Olympic men's hockey team and said he would give the Presidential Medal of Freedom to the team's goalie, Connor Hellebuyck. He presented U.S. Coast Guard rescue swimmer Scott Ruskan with the Legion of Merit for his actions in the aftermath of the July 2025 Central Texas floods.

According to The Wall Street Journal, the theme of the speech was "America at 250: Strong, Prosperous and Respected", referring to the United States Semiquincentennial. Trump's speech included sections discussing his economic policy, including the One Big Beautiful Bill Act, and he requested that Congress codify his healthcare framework. The speech also discussed Trump's peace through strength approach to foreign policy amid the Iran–United States crisis. Trump stated that he prefers a diplomatic solution with Iran, but he will not allow Iran to get nuclear weapons. He furthermore alleged that 32,000 protesters had been killed during the 2026 Iran massacres, and claimed that the Iranian government is developing missiles that could eventually reach the U.S. He also criticized "affordability", calling it a "dirty, rotten lie" perpetuated by Democrats. Trump celebrated the recent military intervention in Venezuela calling it a "absolutely colossal victory for the security of the United States", and later gave the Medal of Honor to a helicopter pilot that participated and was injured during the mission. He touted an influx of "80 million" barrels of oil from "our new friend and partner Venezuela".

The New York Times described the first minutes of the speech being traditional, but that the better part of two hours quickly turned into name-calling, insults, and invective towards Democrats, with Trump casting them as the villains. It described it as "spectacle as survival strategy", noting that he did not introduce any new policy initiatives and blamed every problem on Democrats. During the speech, Trump was described as "setting a trap" for Democrats and attempting to create a viral social media moment by demanding they stand up if they agree that "The first duty of the American government is to protect American citizens, not illegal aliens". When Democrats remained seated, Trump castigated them to cheers from Republicans. The Times described the moment as transforming the speech from "what had been a mostly dutiful State of the Union address" suddenly morphing "into full-blown political theater". When not highlighting graphic and violent crimes committed by illegal immigrants, The Times described Trump as "slamming the Democrats as 'sick,' America-hating, election-meddling thieves", frequently calling them "crazy" and saying they were "destroying our country", while spreading baseless conspiracy theories about election fraud. During the speech, Trump faced heckling and various forms of protests from some Democratic members of congress.

=== False and misleading statements ===
Before the address, media outlets and fact-checkers described Trump's expected falsehoods, mostly about the economy. During and after the event, news media and fact-checkers declared that Trump made multiple false and misleading statements.

Some reporters, including plaintiffs from National Urban League v. Trump, noticed the president claimed that he had "ended" diversity, equity, and inclusion.

== Invitees ==
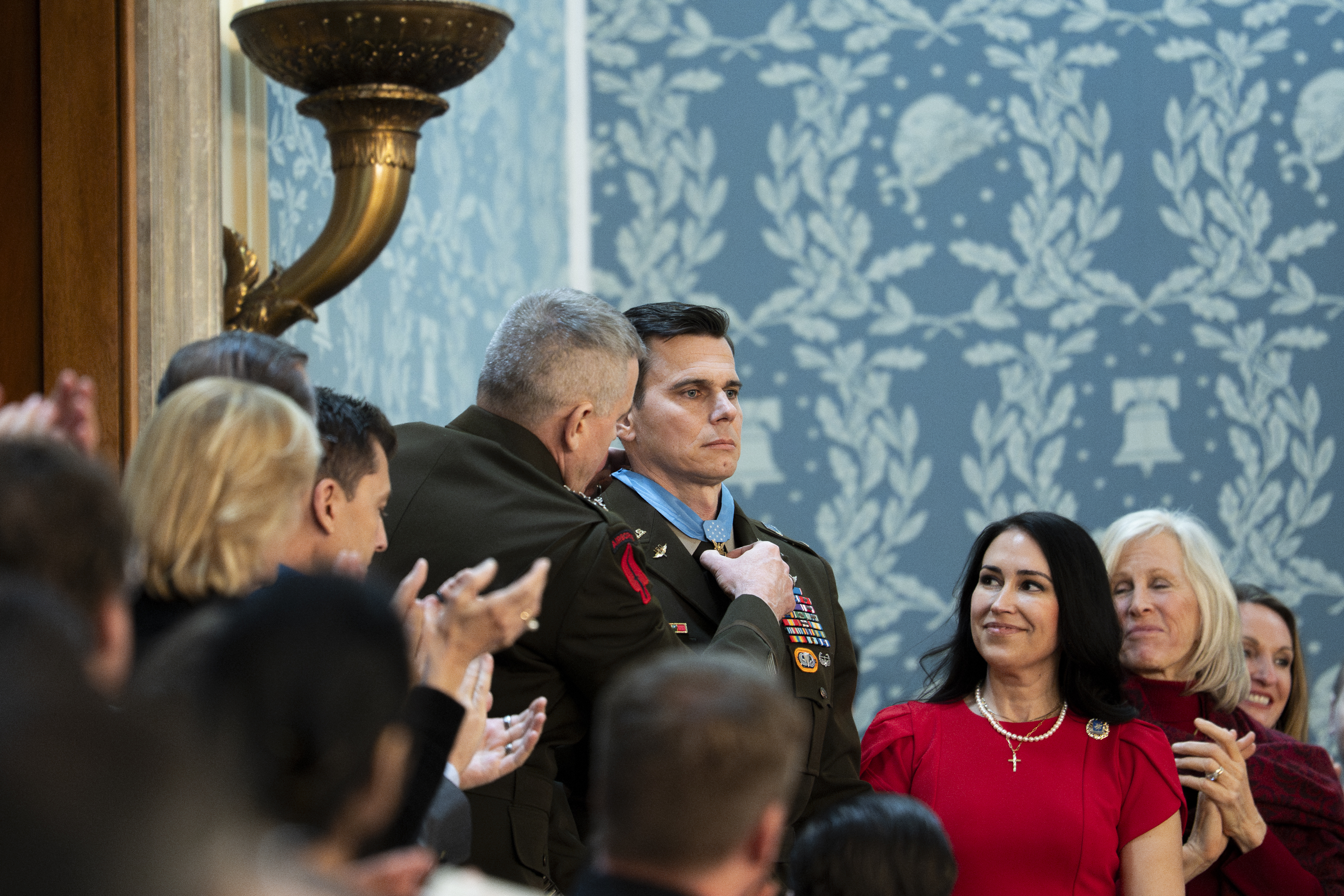
Army Chief Warrant Officer Eric Slover receives the Medal of Honor during the address for his actions during Operation Absolute Resolve.

Trump invited Erika Kirk, the widow of the political activist Charlie Kirk, who was assassinated in September 2025, as a special guest. Speaker of the House Mike Johnson invited Claire Lai, the daughter of the Hong Kong businessman Jimmy Lai, who was sentenced in February 2026 to twenty years in prison for his role in operating the tabloid Apple Daily.

House minority leader Hakeem Jeffries invited the family of Jesse Jackson, a civil rights activist who died the week prior to the speech. Other guests include Marimar Martinez, a Chicago woman who was shot by a Border Patrol agent, an invitee of Illinois representative Chuy García; Aliya Rahman, a Minneapolis woman who was detained by ICE, an invitee of Minnesota representative Ilhan Omar, and Bernie Narvaez, a member of the Napa city council and an invitee of California representative Mike Thompson. At least half a dozen House Democrats invited survivors of Jeffrey Epstein prior to the speech. Ukraine's ambassador to the U.S., Olga Stefanishyna, also attended the State of the Union address.

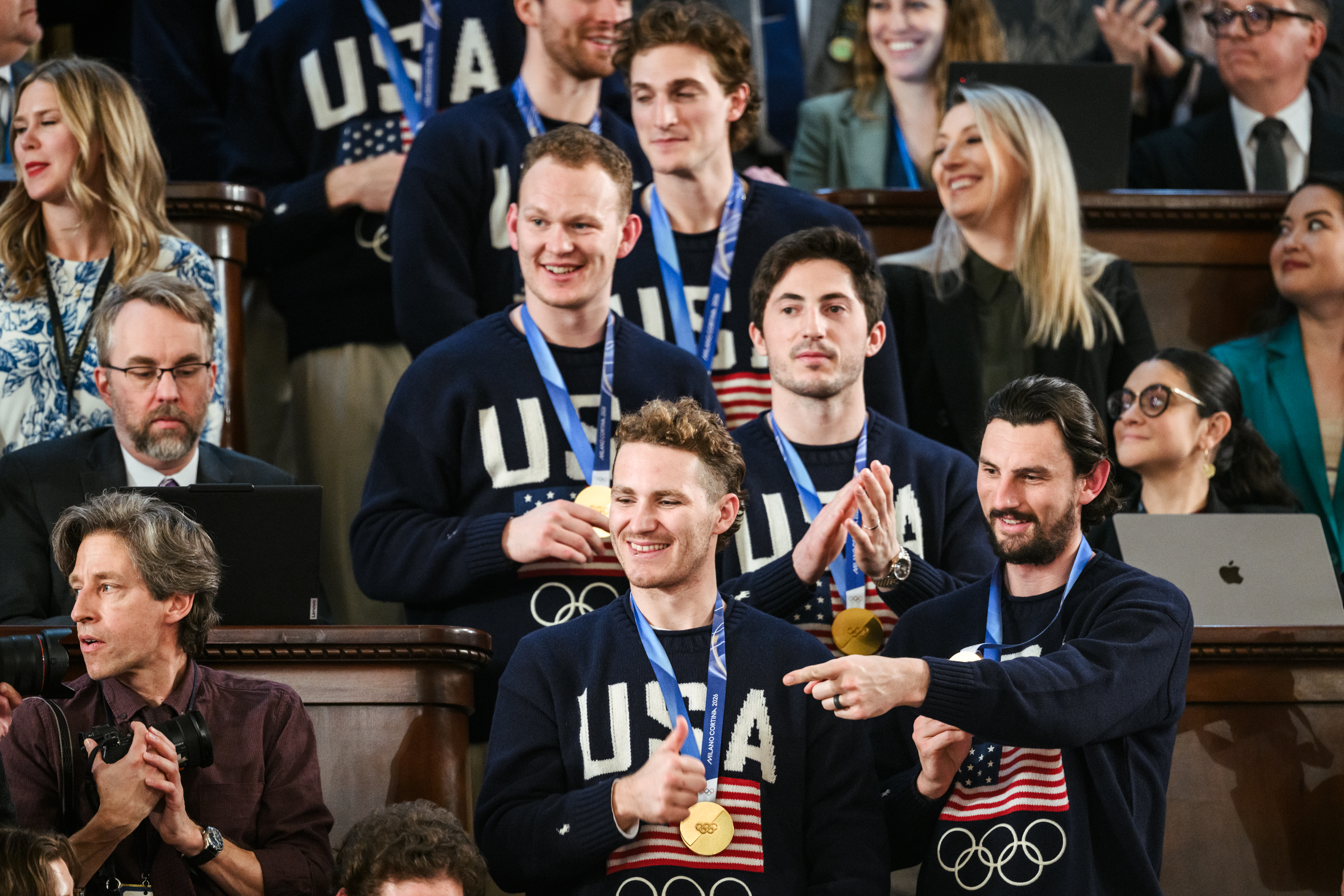
Goalie Connor Hellebuyck (bottom right) attending the address with members of the US Men’s Olympic hockey team. Trump announced during the address that Hellebuyck would receive the Presidential Medal of Freedom.

Venezuelan opposition politician Enrique Márquez, released from prison in a prisoner release in Venezuela after the United States intervention in Venezuela was invited to reunite with his niece. Trump said: "Since the raid we have worked with the new leadership and they have ordered the closure of that vile prison and released hundreds of political prisoners already, with more to come."

After the U.S. Men's Olympic Ice Hockey game, Trump called the men's team and invited the players to the address and to visit the White House with transportation via a military flight. Trump also joked that he would also have to invite the U.S. Women's Olympic team, or he would be impeached. House Speaker Mike Johnson stated that House officials were working to find ways to accommodate both teams as there is no way to have special guests on the floor of Congress, as it is a session of Congress. The women's team rejected the invite on February 23, citing timing and previously scheduled academic and professional commitments. Of the men's team five members of the team: Jake Guentzel, Jake Oettinger, Brock Nelson, Kyle Connor, and Jackson LaCombe did not attend.

President Trump awarded a Purple Heart and two Medals of Honor during the State of the Union Address.

The ruling in the Supreme Court case Learning Resources, Inc. v. Trump, which vacated many of Trump's tariffs, occurred days before the State of the Union address. Trump joked to reporters that the justices who ruled against him were "barely invited". Chief Justice John Roberts and associate Justices Elena Kagan, Brett Kavanaugh and Amy Coney Barrett attended the Address.

== Responses ==
=== Democratic Party response ===
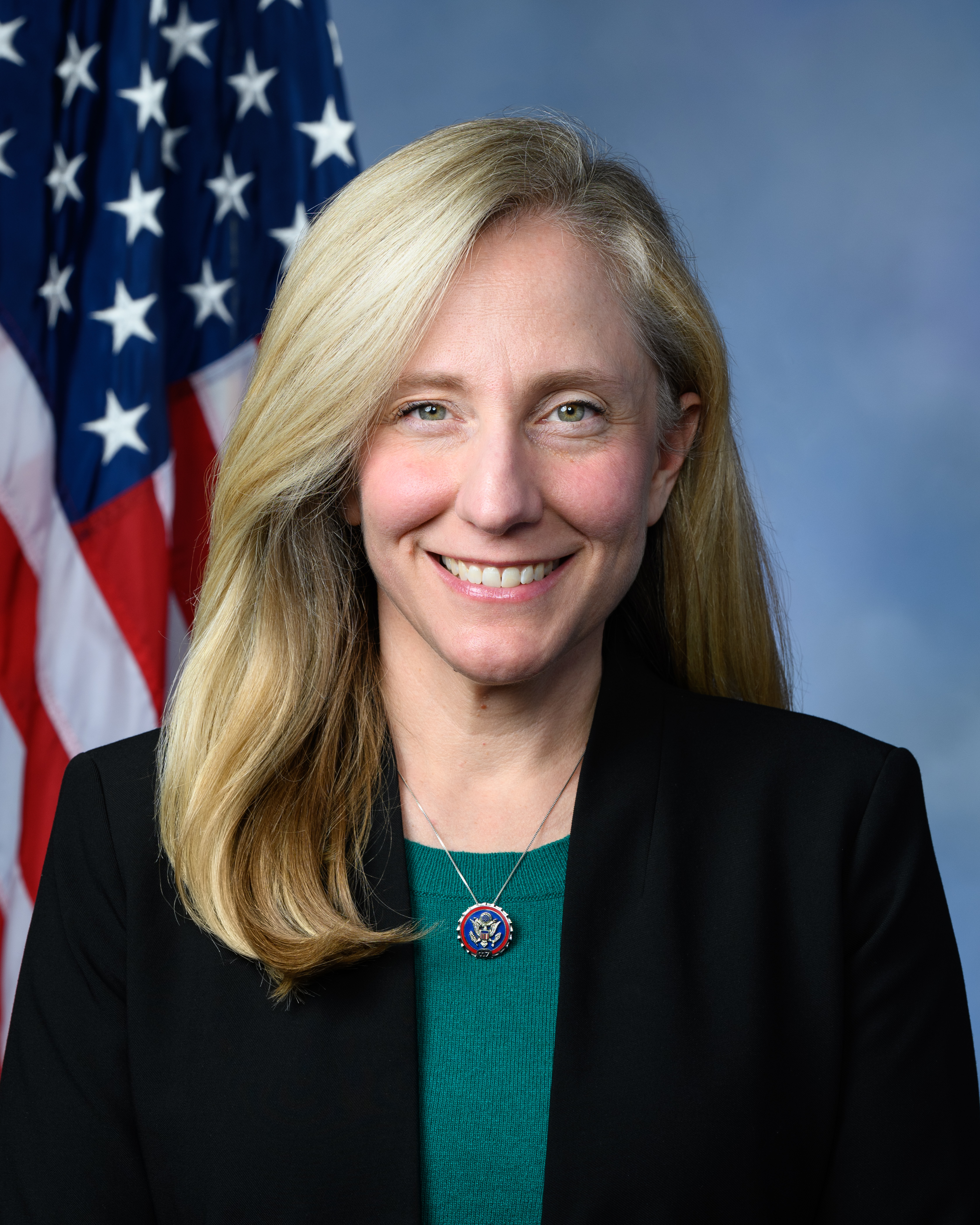
Abigail Spanberger

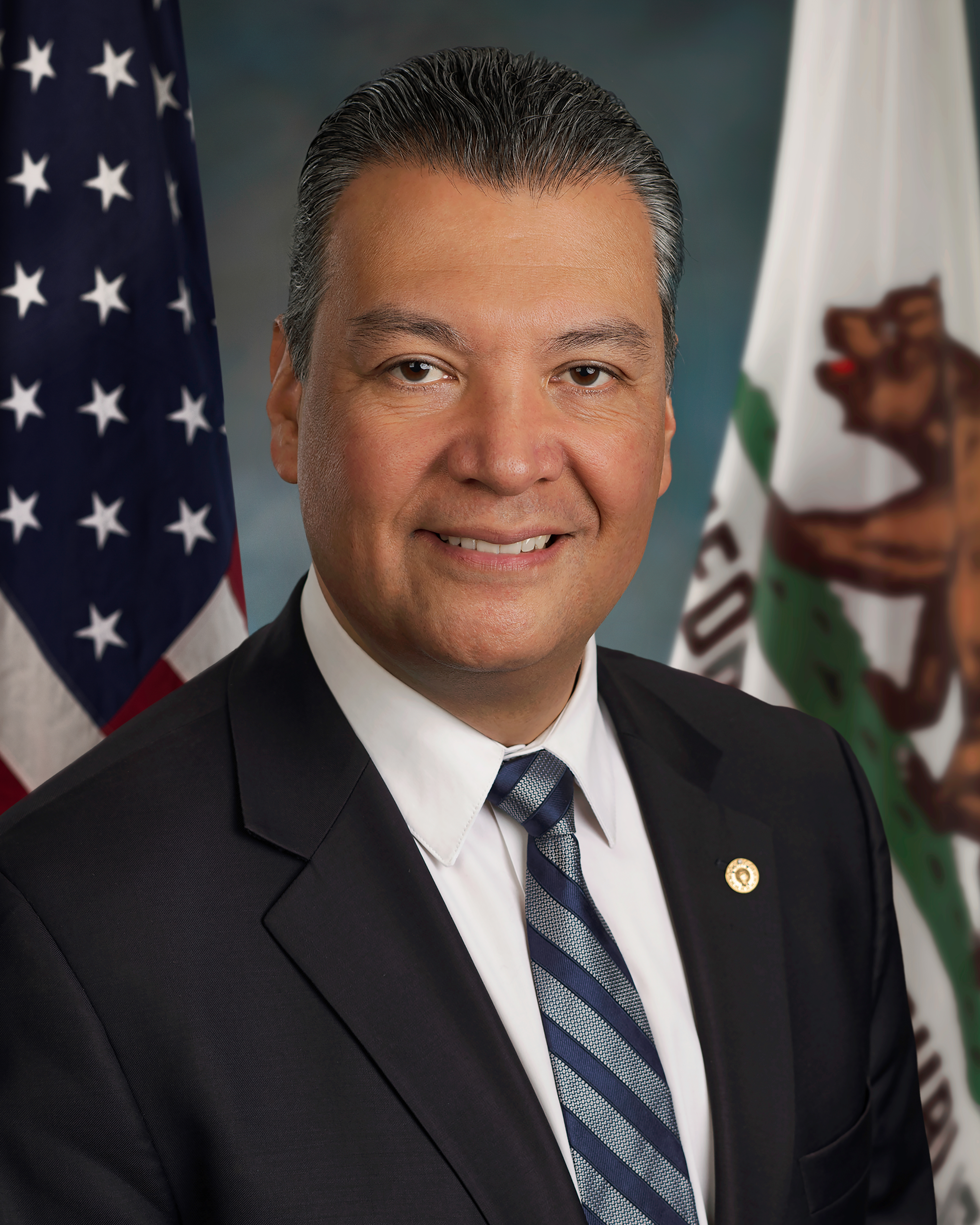
Alex Padilla

Spanberger and Padilla delivered the Democratic response in English and Spanish, respectively.

Abigail Spanberger, the governor of Virginia, gave the official Democratic response in English from the chamber of the House of Burgesses in the reconstructed Capitol in Colonial Williamsburg in Williamsburg, Virginia, while California senator Alex Padilla delivered a response in Spanish. The New York Times described the response as focusing on affordability and stating that Trump was ignoring the concerns of everyday Americans.

=== Other responses ===
Democratic representative Summer Lee, who boycotted the address, delivered the Working Families Party response.

=== Protests, boycotts and disruptions ===
Ahead of the address, House minority leader Hakeem Jeffries, seeking a stoic opposition, told Democrats in the House that members could either boycott the address, or sit in "silent defiance". According to Axios, discussions within the House Democratic Caucus about disrupting the speech had been minimal. Several Democrats told Axios that they intended to protest regardless, though no mass demonstration had been organized. Approximately 50 Democratic lawmakers in the House and Senate intended to boycott the speech, according to The Wall Street Journal, including representatives Alexandria Ocasio-Cortez, Jahana Hayes, and Katherine Clark.

Texas representative Al Green was removed for holding a sign reading, "Black people aren't apes!", a critique of a Truth Social video posted by Trump depicting former president Barack Obama and former first lady Michelle Obama as apes.

Ilhan Omar, a Somali-American Minnesota representative, and Rashida Tlaib, a Michigan representative, heckled the president from the House floor. As Trump spoke about illegal immigration and a fraud investigation into the Somali community in Minnesota; he stated that Democrats should be "ashamed" to which Omar shouted, "You should be ashamed!" back at the president, while Tlaib yelled "Liar!". The two representatives grew increasingly vocal as the speech progressed, with fellow Democrat Rep. Sarah McBride also shouting at Trump. Their outrage was partly fueled by the January killings of U.S. citizens Renee Good and Alex Pretti by immigration agents in Minneapolis, as well as by the treatment, that same month, by the U.S. Immigration and Customs Enforcement (ICE) agents of Minnesotan Aliya Rahman, a U.S. citizen with disabilities. Rahman was present as a guest of representative Omar, and was removed and arrested, while other guests also stood. Fellow Democrat Rep. Norma Torres also drew attention to the two deceased U.S citizens by holding a sign bearing their photos during the address.

An event held at the National Press Club that was sponsored by an organization affiliated with Miles Taylor was attended by lawmakers including Dan Goldman, Ron Wyden and April McClain Delaney as well as Minneapolis mayor Jacob Frey.

A counter-event known as the "People's State of the Union" was held, beginning at 8 pm EST and running to 11 pm EST on February 24, 2026. Attendees included:

- Jim Himes
- John Larson
- Ed Markey
- Jeff Merkley
- Chris Murphy
- Adam Schiff
- Tina Smith

=== Iranian reaction ===
In response to what Trump said about Iran, the Iranian Foreign Ministry accused him of telling "big lies" about the nuclear program and death tolls.

== Public opinion ==
According to a CNN/SSRS poll, based on a sample of 482 respondents, viewership of the address was 13% more Republican than the general public. Among viewers, 64% of viewers rated Trump's address positively, while 36% were negative. Women rated Trump's address more positively, at 67%, compared to 61% among men.

== George Santos prediction market investigation ==
George Santos—a convicted fraudster who had recently been expelled from the U.S. House of Representatives—had posted on social media that he would attend the address, but had also placed bets on the prediction market Kalshi that he would not attend. Kalshi detected the trades and reported them to the United States Department of Justice and the United States Commodity Futures Trading Commission (CFTC). Santos did not attend and turned a profit.

Two months after opening the investigation, the CFTC announced that it had determined Santos "engag[ed] in manipulative activity" and ordered him to pay the agency the profit he made from the trade along with a nearly equal civil penalty, totaling around $35,000. He was also banned from trading for three years. On August 31, Kalshi penalized Santos over $70,000 and banned him from the platform for life; this was the first time Kalshi ever imposed a lifetime ban.

== See also ==
- List of joint sessions of the United States Congress
- Timeline of the second Trump presidency (2026 Q1)

Preceded by 2025 joint session speech	State of the Union addresses 2026	Succeeded by
