= Kill or capture =

Kill or capture may refer to:

- Kill or Capture (Alexander book), a 2011 book by Matthew Alexander
- Kill or Capture (Klaidman book), a 2012 book by Daniel Klaidman
- United States kill or capture strategy in Iraq, a 2007 United States strategy/policy
- Joint Prioritized Effects List, a list of individuals who coalition forces in Afghanistan try to capture or kill

== See also ==
- Wanted Dead or Alive (disambiguation)
