= Matthew Alexander =

Matthew Alexander may refer to:

- Matthew Alexander (writer), pseudonymous author of the book How to Break a Terrorist (2008) and Kill or Capture (2011)
- Matthew Alexander (footballer) (born 2002), English League One football player
- Matthew Alexander (video game designer), co-designer of the Apple game Hard Hat Mack
- Matt Alexander (born 1947), retired Major League baseball player
- Matt Alexander (politician), Colorado politician
- Matt Alexander (rugby union) (born 1966), South African rugby union player
- Matthew Alexander, Victim of the Indianapolis FedEx shooting
