= Vinay Reddy =

Indian-American speechwriter and political advisor

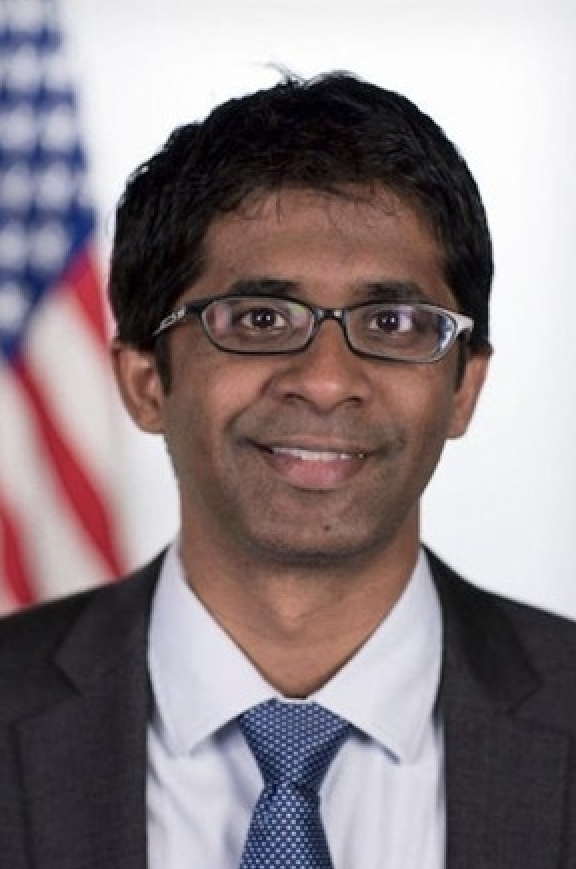

White House Director of Speechwriting
- In office January 20, 2021 – January 20, 2025
- President: Joe Biden
- Preceded by: Stephen Miller
- Succeeded by: Ross Worthington

Personal details
- Born: 1979 (age 46–47) Kansas City, Kansas, U.S.
- Party: Democratic
- Children: 2
- Education: Miami University (BA); Ohio State University (JD)

Vinay Reddy is an American speechwriter and political advisor who served as the White House Director of Speechwriting from 2021 to 2025 under President Joe Biden. Reddy was Chief Speechwriter to Biden during his second term as Vice President of the United States. After the Obama–Biden administration and before rejoining the Biden White House, Reddy worked as Vice President of Strategic Communications for the National Basketball Association.

== Early life and education ==
The son of Telugu immigrants from India, Reddy was born in Kansas City, Kansas and raised in Dayton, Ohio. He has roots in Pothireddypeta, a village in the Karimnagar district of Telangana, India. He earned a bachelor's degree from Miami University and a juris doctor from the Ohio State University Moritz College of Law.

== Career ==
Reddy worked as a speechwriter for U.S. Senator Sherrod Brown. He was Chief Speechwriter to Joe Biden during his second term as Vice President of the United States. During the Obama–Biden administration, Reddy was a senior speechwriter for officials of the United States Environmental Protection Agency and the United States Department of Health and Human Services. After the Obama–Biden administration, Reddy worked as the Vice President of Strategic Communications for the National Basketball Association.

Reddy served as a senior advisor and speechwriter during the Joe Biden 2020 presidential campaign and the presidential transition. On December 22, 2020, Biden designated Reddy as the incoming White House Director of Speechwriting. Reddy is the first Asian American to hold the position of White House Director of Speechwriting in history.

== Personal life ==
Reddy and his wife have two daughters.
