= Stuart E. Eizenstat =

American diplomat and attorney (born 1943)

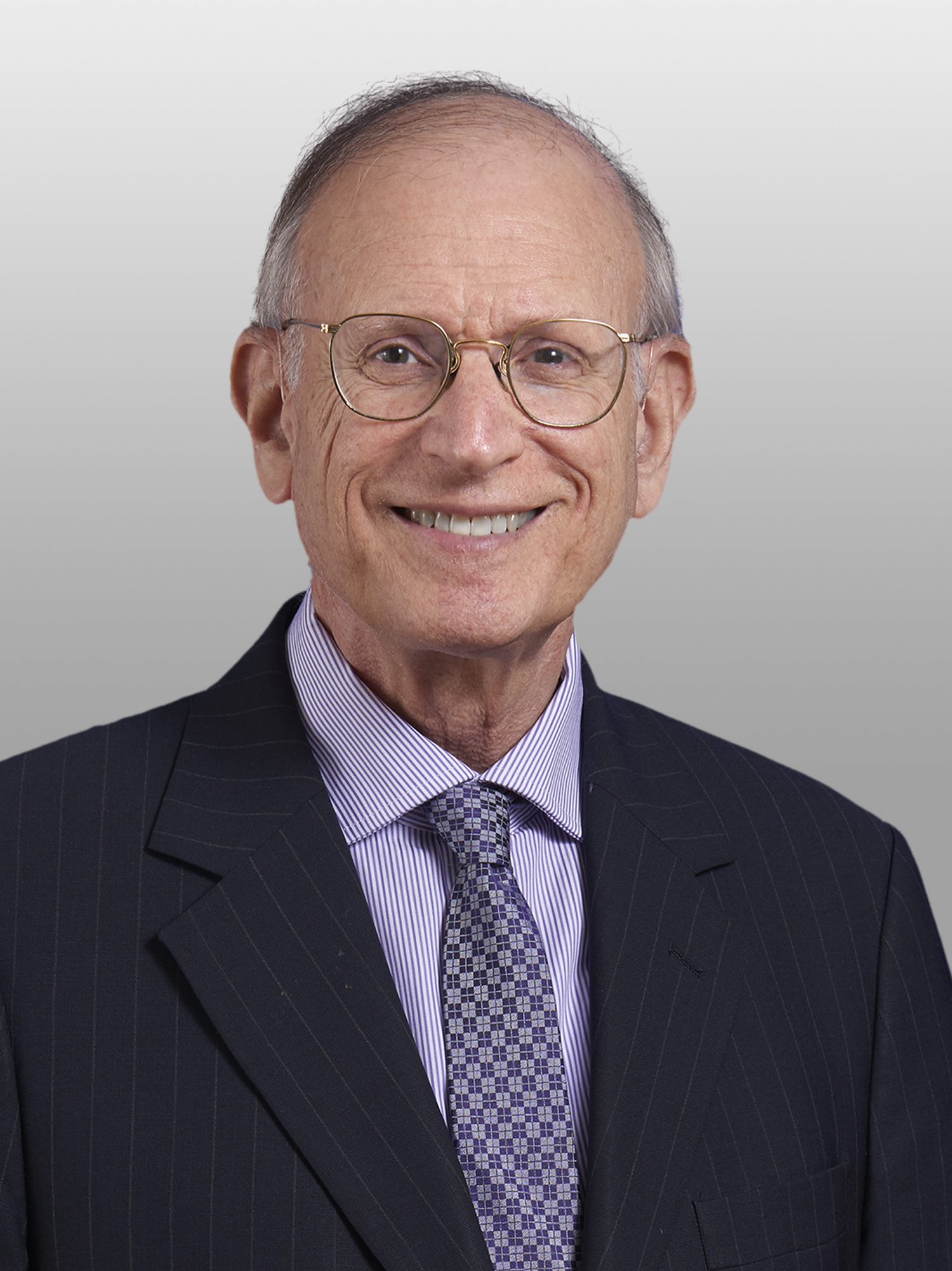
- Official portrait, 2014

Special Advisor for Holocaust Issues
- Incumbent
- Assumed office December 18, 2013
- President: Barack Obama; Donald Trump; Joe Biden; Donald Trump
- Preceded by: Position established

8th United States Deputy Secretary of the Treasury
- In office July 16, 1999 – January 20, 2001
- President: Bill Clinton
- Preceded by: Larry Summers
- Succeeded by: Kenneth Dam

14th Under Secretary of State for Economic, Business, and Agricultural Affairs
- In office June 6, 1997 – July 16, 1999
- President: Bill Clinton
- Preceded by: Joan Spero
- Succeeded by: Alan Larson

Under Secretary of Commerce for International Trade
- In office April 1996 – June 6, 1997
- President: Bill Clinton
- Preceded by: Timothy Hauser (acting)
- Succeeded by: David L. Aaron

United States Ambassador to the European Union
- In office August 2, 1993 – April 1996
- President: Bill Clinton
- Preceded by: James Dobbins
- Succeeded by: Vernon Weaver

White House Domestic Affairs Advisor
- In office January 20, 1977 – January 20, 1981
- President: Jimmy Carter
- Preceded by: James Cannon
- Succeeded by: Ralph Bledsoe (1985)

Personal details
- Born: Stuart Elliott Eizenstat; January 15, 1943 (age 83) Chicago, Illinois, U.S.
- Party: Democratic
- Spouse: Frances Eizenstat
- Education: University of North Carolina at Chapel Hill (BA); Harvard University (JD)

Stuart Elliott Eizenstat (born January 15, 1943) is an American diplomat and attorney. He served as the United States Ambassador to the European Union from 1993 to 1996 and as the United States Deputy Secretary of the Treasury from 1999 to 2001. For many years, and currently (as of 2025) he has served as a partner and Senior Counsel at the Washington, D.C.–based law firm Covington & Burling and as a senior strategist at APCO Worldwide.

== Biography ==
=== Early life ===
Stuart E. Eizenstat was born on January 15, 1943, in Chicago and raised in Atlanta; he was an all-city and honorable-mention All-America basketball player in high school. He earned an A.B. cum laude and Phi Beta Kappa, in political science from the University of North Carolina at Chapel Hill where he was a brother of the Alpha Pi chapter of Zeta Beta Tau fraternity. He received his Juris Doctor degree from Harvard Law School in 1967. Eizenstat attended Blue Star Camps in Hendersonville, North Carolina, as a youth.

=== Career ===
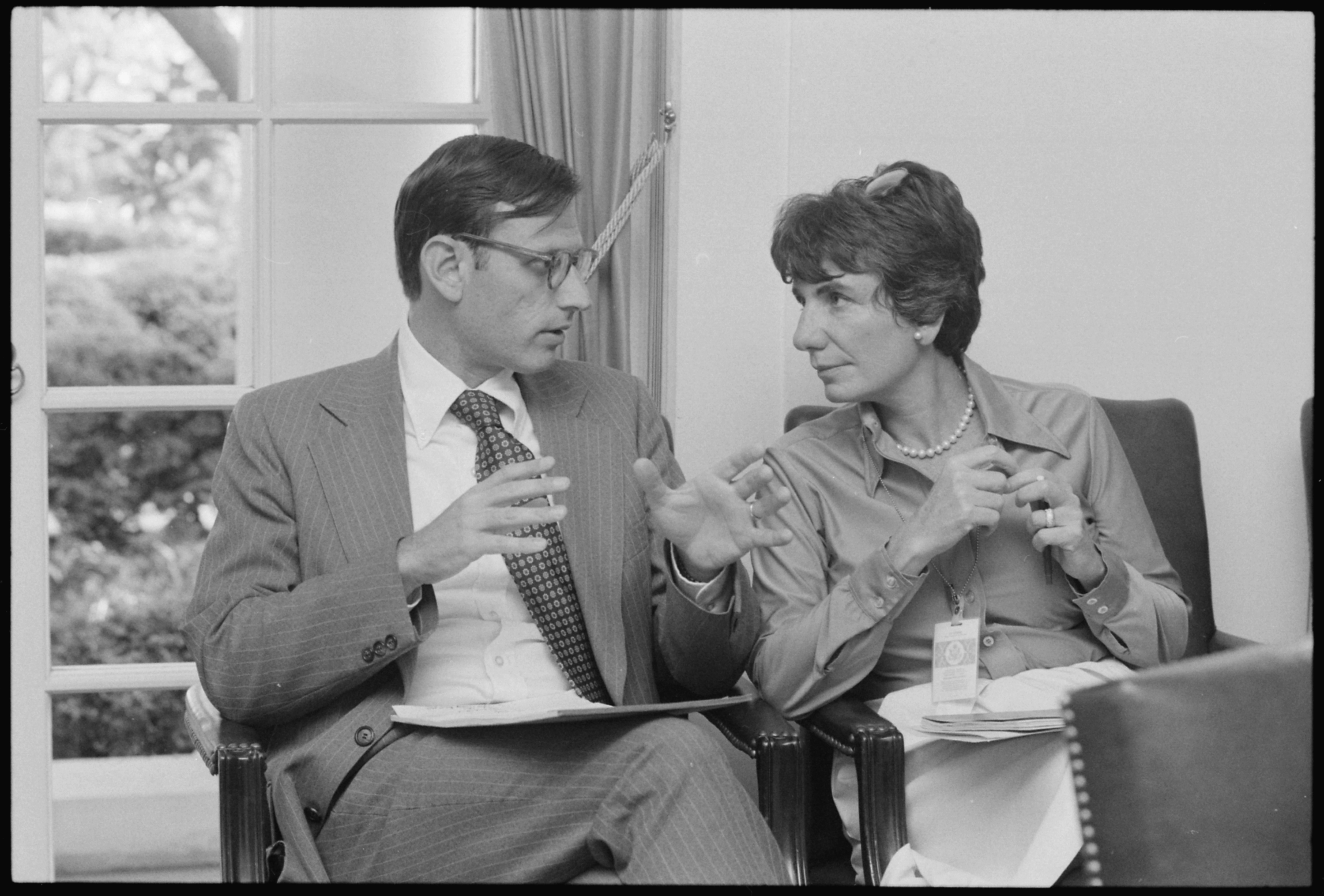
Stuart Eizenstat and Anne Wexler, August 10, 1978

He served as a law clerk for the Honorable Newell Edenfield of the United States District Court for the Northern District of Georgia.

Eizenstat worked as the issues director of Jimmy Carter's 1970 gubernatorial campaign.

Eizenstat worked on Carter's 1976 presidential campaign. He served as his point man in the drafting of the 1976 party platform and headed the issues operations of Carter's campaign.

From 1977 to 1981, he was President Carter's Chief Domestic Policy Adviser, and Executive Director of the White House Domestic Policy Staff.

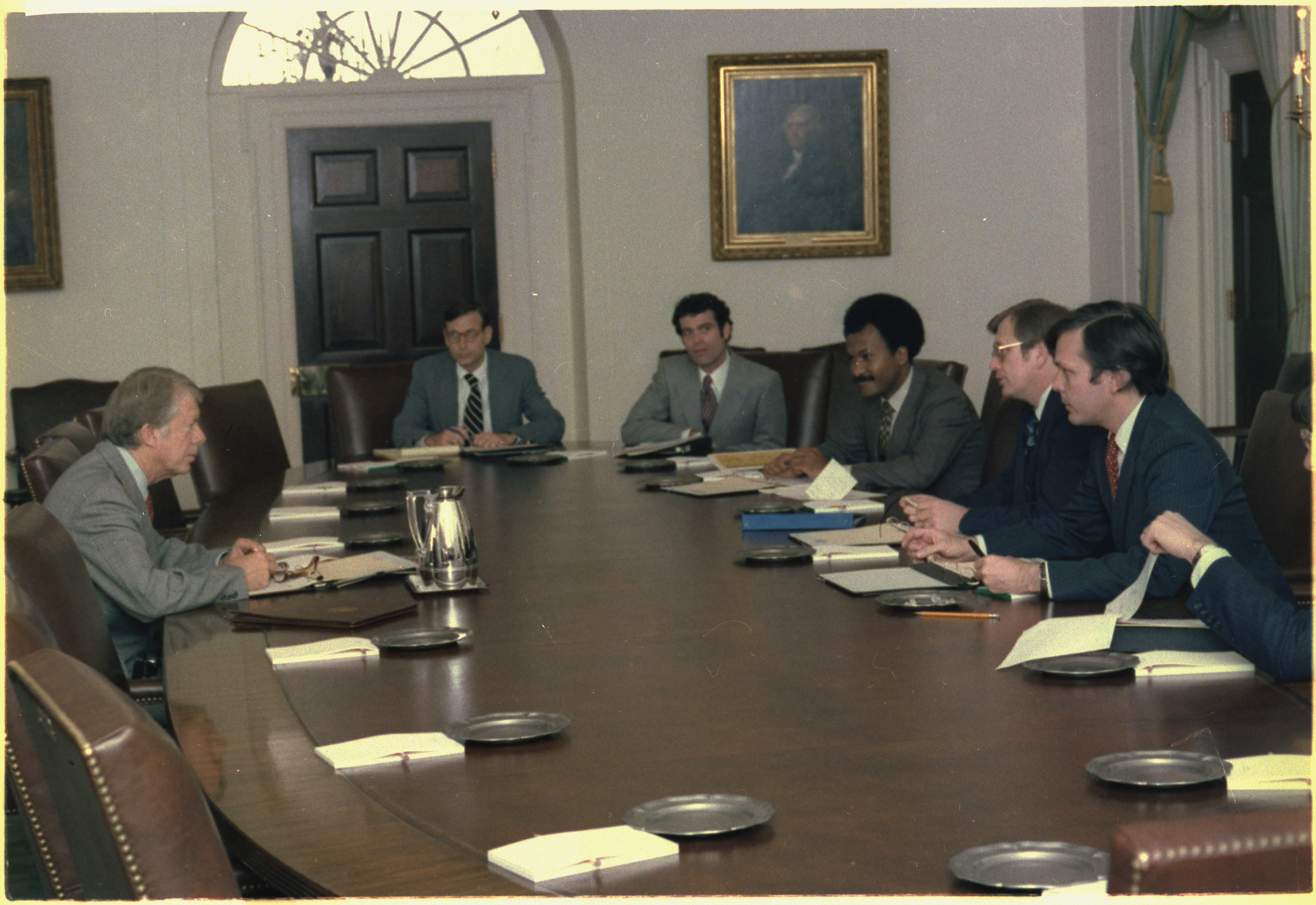
Jimmy Carter hosts budget meeting with Eizenstat, Jack Watson, James McIntyre and other White House aides.

In 1983, he wrote for Quarante magazine an article entitled "The Quiet Revolution". He was the first to describe the "feminization of poverty". He was President Bill Clinton's Deputy Secretary of the Treasury (1999–2001), Under Secretary of State for Economic, Business, and Agricultural Affairs (1997–1999), and also served as the Under Secretary of Commerce for International Trade at the International Trade Administration (ITA) from 1996 to 1997.

In 1984, Eizenstat was elected as a fellow of the National Academy of Public Administration.

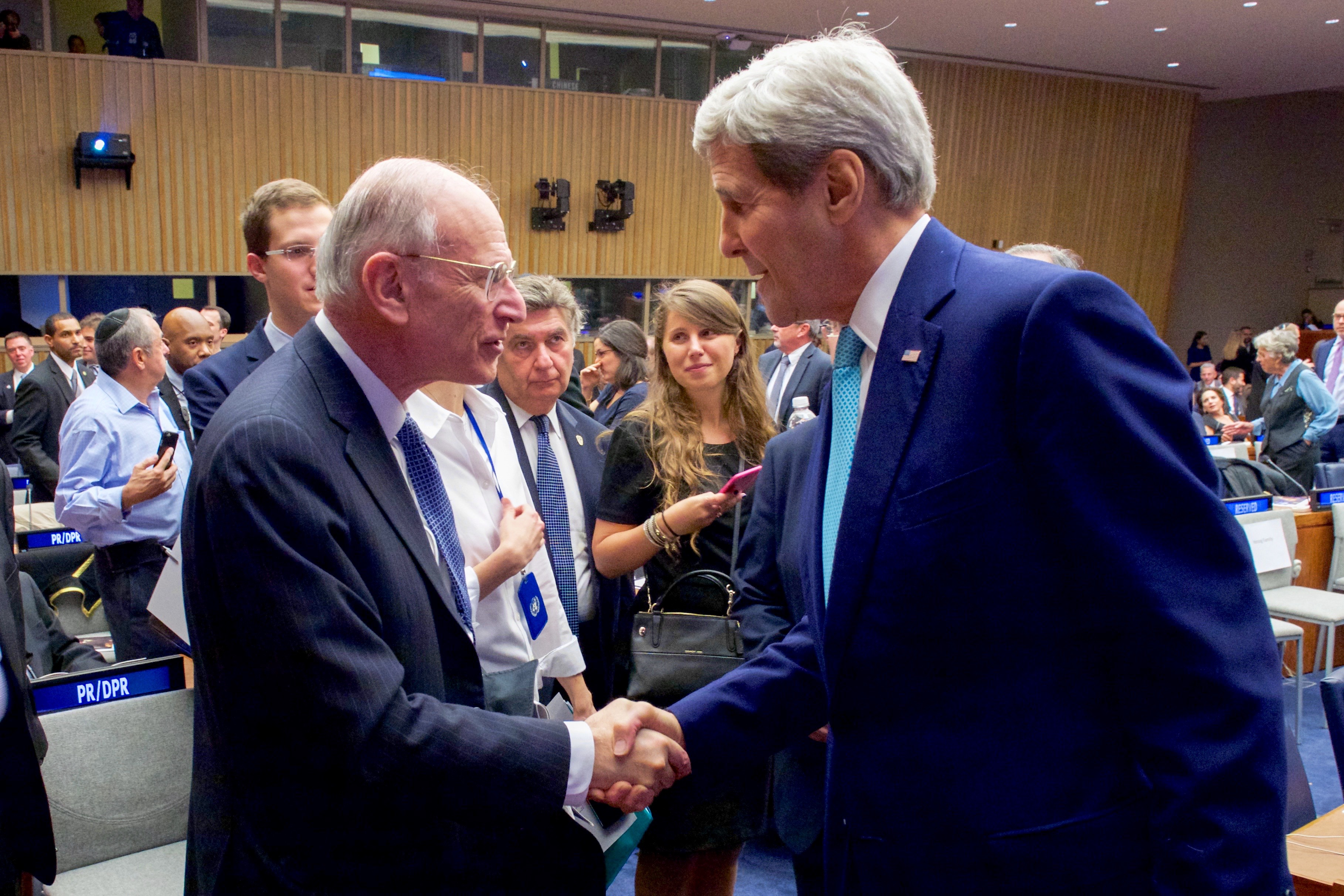
US Secretary of State Kerry Greets Eizenstat before delivering speech at U.N., 2015

He served as the United States Ambassador to the European Union from 1993 to 1996 and as co-chairman of the European-American Business Council (EABC). Additionally, he is a member of the Board of Advisors of the Global Panel Foundation.

Eizenstat led the U.S. delegation at the Third Conference of the Parties in Kyoto, Japan, which concluded by adopting the Kyoto Protocol and military exemptions to emissions controls.

In 2008, the Ambassador Stuart E. Eizenstat Distinguished Professorship in Jewish history and culture was endowed in Eizenstat's honor at the University of North Carolina at Chapel Hill. For his work he has received the Courage and Conscience Award from the Government of Israel, the Knight Commander's Cross (Badge and Star) of the Order of Merit of the Federal Republic of Germany, the French Legion of Honor from the Government of France, and the International Advocate for Peace Award from the Cardozo Journal of Conflict Resolution.

Eizenstat is also a member of the Atlantic Council's Board of Directors.

On January 9, Eizenstat gave a eulogy for Carter upon the event of his 2025 state funeral. His stated purpose was to dispel the myth that Carter was an unsuccessful president but was successful in the years of his post-presidency.

=== Holocaust restitution ===
Eizenstat has devoted much effort to various aspects of Holocaust restitution. This has included partial recompense for slave and forced labor, and most recently in 2018 for the trauma suffered by Kindertransport. It has also included restitution of Holocaust-era assets to their original owners or their heirs. Initially, he did this as President Clinton's "Special Representative of the President and Secretary of State on Holocaust-Era Issues." In this position, he took a leadership role for many nations. In this role, he was approached by Turkish ambassador Şükrü Elekdağ who told him that "Turkey could no longer guarantee the safety of the Jews in Turkey" if there was any mention of the Armenian genocide in the United States Holocaust Memorial Museum. Eizenstat has continued this role as a private citizen. In 1998, he organized the Washington Conference on Holocaust Era Assets, resulting in the Washington Principles on Nazi-Confiscated Art.

Eizenstat acted on many occasions as a negotiator to gain payments by the current German government to Holocaust survivors, or their heirs. He also negotiated major agreements with the Swiss, Austrian, French, and other European governments, concerning slave and forced labor, which included life insurance policy payments to heirs of victims of the Holocaust; and restitution of Holocaust victim bank account assets, as well as of artworks which had been looted by the Nazis to their original owners, or their heirs. (Many such artworks had been acquired at a later date by National museums or important private museums.) One such piece is Gustav Klimt's Lady in Gold which was returned to Maria Altmann.

In 2018, he helped negotiate a symbolic payment of 2,500 euros to those who had survived the Holocaust by having escaped it through the Kindertransport program, which had been assisted by the British government. This followed the precedent established in 2014 when Child Survivors negotiated a symbolic payment of 2,500 euros to child Holocaust survivors. The Kindertransport survivors were also Holocaust survivors, since they had been separated from their parents, often as very young children, and nearly all of them later discovered that their parents had died as victims of the Nazis. Eizenstat wrote about his restitution efforts in his book Imperfect Justice: Looted Assets, Slave Labor, and the Unfinished Business of World War II (2009).

In 2013 Eizenstat was appointed "Special Advisor for Holocaust Issues" to Secretary of State Hillary Clinton. He served as Expert Advisor on Holocaust Issues during the first Trump administration, and in 2021 he was appointed by the Biden administration to serve as Special Advisor on Holocaust Issues.

=== Personal life ===
He was married to the late Frances Eizenstat and has two sons and eight grandchildren.

== Honors ==
- Leo Baeck Medal (2013)

== Publications ==
- Imperfect Justice: Looted Assets, Slave Labor, and the Unfinished Business of World War II. PublicAffairs. 5 August 2009. ISBN 978-0-7867-5105-1.
  - Justicia Imperfecta. Berg Institute. Spain. ISBN 978-84-948528-4-8.
- The Future of the Jews: How Global Forces are Impacting the Jewish People, Israel, and Its Relationship with the United States. Rowman & Littlefield Publishers. 3 May 2012. ISBN 978-1-4422-1629-7.
- President Carter: The White House Years. Thomas Dunne Books. 24 May 2018. ISBN 978-1-2501-0455-7.
- The Art of Diplomacy: How American Negotiators Reached Historic Agreements That Changed The World. Rowman & Littlefield Publishers. 28 May 2024. ISBN 978-1538167991.

== See also ==
- Christoph Meili

Political offices
Preceded by James Cannon	White House Domestic Affairs Advisor; 1977–1981	Vacant Title next held by Ralph Bledsoe
Preceded by Timothy Hauser (Acting)	Under Secretary of Commerce for International Trade; 1996–1997	Succeeded by David Aaron
Preceded by Joan Spero	Under Secretary of State for Economic, Business, and Agricultural Affairs; 1997–1999	Succeeded by Alan Larson
Preceded by Larry Summers	United States Deputy Secretary of the Treasury; 1999–2001	Succeeded by Kenneth Dam
Diplomatic posts
Preceded by James Dobbins	United States Ambassador to the European Union; 1993–1996	Succeeded by Vernon Weaver
New office	Special Advisor for Holocaust Issues; 2013–present	Incumbent
