= William McGurn =

American writer

Bill McGurn
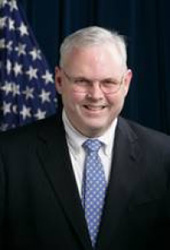

White House Director of Speechwriting
- In office June 14, 2006 – December 14, 2007
- President: George W. Bush
- Preceded by: Michael Gerson
- Succeeded by: Marc Thiessen

Personal details
- Born: December 4, 1958 (age 66) San Diego, California, U.S.
- Political party: Republican
- Spouse: Julie Hoffman
- Children: 3
- Education: University of Notre Dame (BA); Boston University (MA)

William McGurn (born December 4, 1958) is an American political writer. He was the chief speechwriter for President George W. Bush from June 2006 until February 2008, replacing Michael Gerson.

== Early life ==
McGurn was born December 4, 1958, in San Diego. He received his bachelor's degree in philosophy from the University of Notre Dame in 1981; he later earned a master's degree in communications from Boston University.

== Career ==
He began his career as the managing editor at the American Spectator. In 1989, he moved to National Review where he was the Washington Bureau Chief until 1992. From 1992 to 1998, McGurn served as the senior editor of the Far Eastern Economic Review. He then became Chief Editorial Writer for The Wall Street Journal. He joined the White House as a speechwriter in February 2005. He became the Chief Speechwriter for President George W. Bush in 2006. In February 2008 he departed to become a visiting fellow at Hillsdale College. Early in 2009 he joined News Corporation, which had bought The Wall Street Journal in August 2007, as the speechwriter for News Corp. CEO Rupert Murdoch. In December 2012, he became Editorial Page Editor of the New York Post. He rejoined The Wall Street Journal in April 2015 and now writes the Main Street column; he is also an executive at its parent company.

On January 23, 2023, two days after the 2023 Monterey Park Shooting, McGurn published an op-ed titled, "Are There “Too Many Asians”?" in the Wall Street Journal opinion section. Its headline was criticized for its supposed insensitivity. The article was later renamed "China and the Population Bomb That Wasn’t". The article in fact criticized the long-term Western policies and perspectives that were instrumental in forming the Chinese "one child" policy. The article ended by decrying the fact that recognitions of the harms inherent in such a policy came 50 years too late.

== Personal life ==
McGurn and his wife, Julie Hoffman, live in Madison, New Jersey. They previously lived in Hong Kong where they adopted three daughters from China.
