= Ralph Bledsoe =

American academic administrator, businessman, and political advisor

Director of the Domestic Policy Council
- In office June 20, 1985 – March 30, 1987
- President: Ronald Reagan
- Preceded by: Stuart E. Eizenstat (1981)
- Succeeded by: Ken Cribb

Personal details
- Born: October 10, 1933 (age 92) Waco, Texas, U.S.
- Education: Texas A&M University (BBA); University of California, Los Angeles (MBA); University of Southern California (DPA)

Ralph C. Bledsoe (born October 10, 1933) is an American academic administrator, businessman, and political advisor who served as assistant to President Ronald Reagan and director of the United States Domestic Policy Council from 1985 to 1987.

== Early life and education ==
A native of Waco, Texas, Bledsoe earned a Bachelor of Business Administration degree from Texas A&M University, a Master of Business Administration from the University of California, Los Angeles, and a Doctor of Public Administration from the University of Southern California.

== Career ==
From 1958 to 1971, Bledsoe worked for the System Development Corporation. He worked as a faculty member of the Federal Executive Institute and director of the Emergency Management Institute. In 1981, Bledsoe joined the Office of Policy Development and later served as the associate director of the Office of Planning and Evaluation in the White House Office. In 1982, he was appointed special assistant to the president and executive secretary for the Council on Management and Administration. From 1982 to 1985, he served as associate director of the Office of Policy Development for Management and Administration. In 1984 and 1985, he was the executive director of the Federal Property Review Board. From 1985 to 1987, he served as assistant to President Ronald Reagan and director of the United States Domestic Policy Council.

In 1988, Bledsoe was selected as the director of the Ronald Reagan Presidential Library and Museum. He also worked as an administrator at the University of Southern California.

Bledsoe is a Fellow of the National Academy of Public Administration (United States).
