= Marc Thiessen =

American conservative author

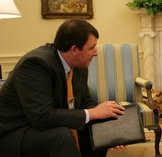
- Thiessen in 2007

White House Director of Speechwriting
- In office December 14, 2007 – January 20, 2009
- President: George W. Bush
- Preceded by: William McGurn
- Succeeded by: Jon Favreau

Personal details
- Born: Marc Alexander Thiessen; January 13, 1967 (age 59) New York City, New York, U.S.
- Party: Republican
- Spouse: Pamela Thiessen
- Children: 4
- Education: Vassar College (AB); Naval War College (attended)

Marc Alexander Thiessen (born January 13, 1967) is an American political columnist, speechwriter, and political commentator. He is a columnist for The Washington Post, a Fox News contributor, and a resident fellow at the American Enterprise Institute. From 2004 to 2009, he was a member of President George W. Bush’s speechwriting team, serving as chief speechwriter in the final years of the administration. Earlier, he was chief speechwriter for Secretary of Defense Donald Rumsfeld and a longtime aide to Senator Jesse Helms.

In 2010, Thiessen published Courting Disaster, a book defending the CIA’s use of enhanced interrogation techniques, which became a New York Times bestseller and drew significant criticism. He has also co-founded a communications firm and has been affiliated with the Hoover Institution as a visiting fellow.

== Early life and education ==
Thiessen was born on January 13, 1967. He grew up on the Upper East Side in Manhattan, where both his parents were doctors and "left-of-center liberal Democrat types". His mother grew up in Poland and fought as a teenager in the Warsaw Uprising, a military struggle in which his grandfather died.

Thiessen is a graduate of the Taft School (1985), a private prep school in Watertown, Connecticut. He earned a Bachelor of Arts degree from Vassar College in 1989 and has done graduate studies at the Naval War College.

== Career ==
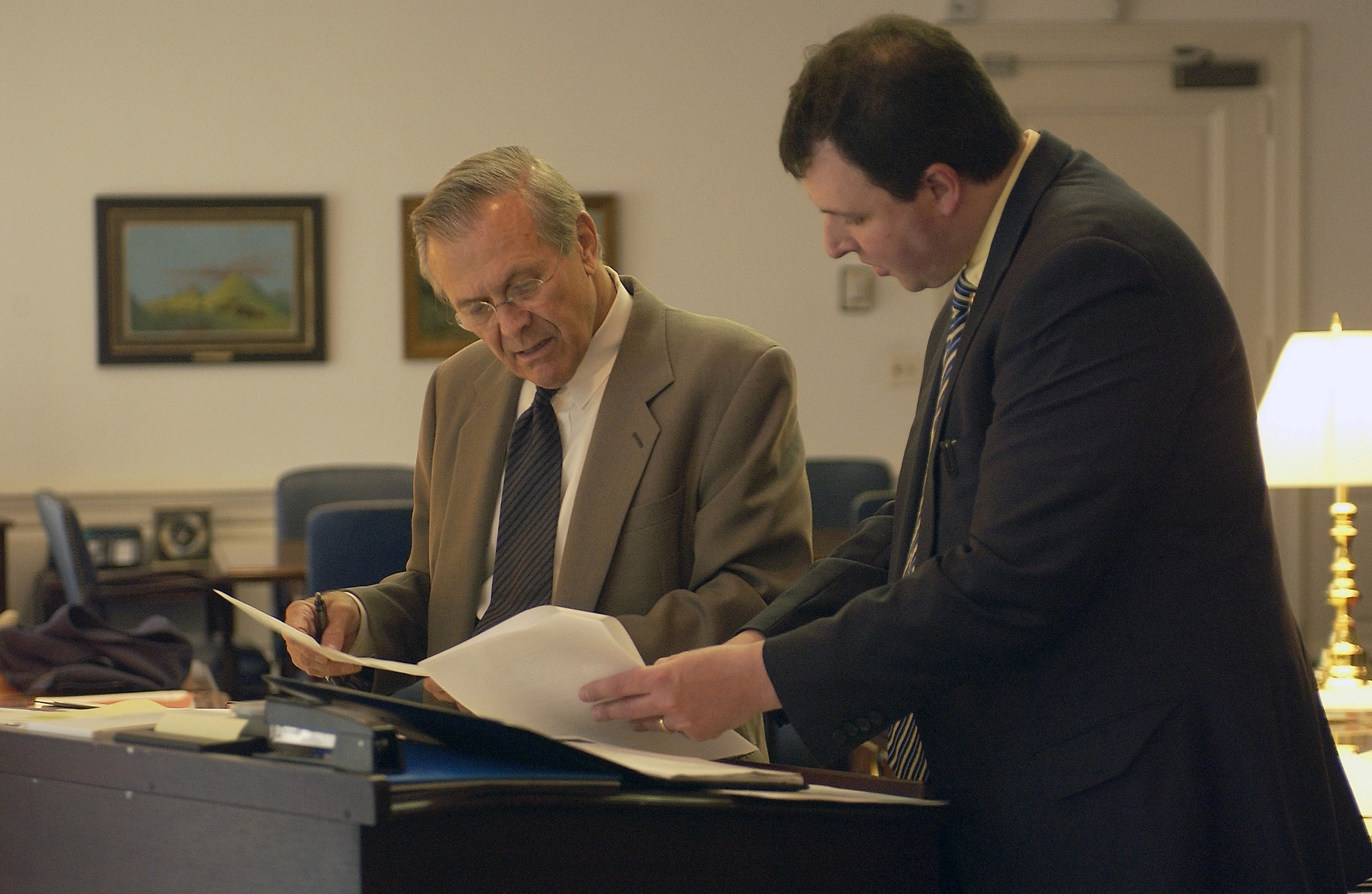
Thiessen with Secretary of Defense Donald Rumsfeld in 2003

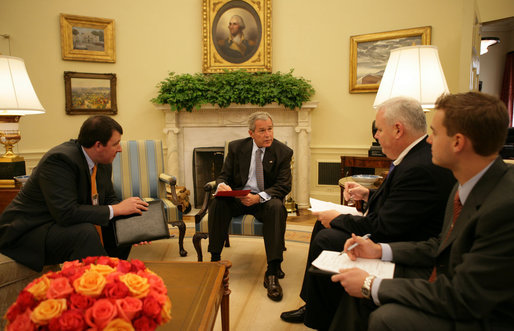
Thiessen with President George W. Bush, William McGurn, and Christopher Michel in 2007

After graduating from college, Thiessen moved to Washington, D.C., where he has worked for many years, starting at the lobbying firm Black, Manafort, Stone and Kelly (BMSK) from 1989 to 1993. From 1995 to 2001, he served on Capitol Hill as spokesman and senior policy advisor to Senate Foreign Relations Committee Chairman Jesse Helms (R-NC).

He joined the George W. Bush administration as Chief Speechwriter for Secretary of Defense Donald Rumsfeld in 2001. He worked in the Pentagon, and was there during the September 11th attack on the Pentagon. He later moved over to Bush's speechwriting team in 2004. In February 2008, he became chief speechwriter when William McGurn resigned.

In March 2009, Thiessen and Peter Schweizer founded the communications firm Oval Office Writers LLC.

Since 2009, Thiessen has been a visiting fellow at the Hoover Institution. He is also a resident fellow at the American Enterprise Institute.

Thiessen has been a columnist for The Washington Post since March 2010. In his columns, he criticized the Obama administration and advocated against the Iran nuclear deal. In 2020, he defended President Donald Trump’s decision to assassinate Iranian General Qasem Soleimani, saying it was "defensive, preemptive, and lawful."

He also serves as a Fox News commentator.

== Courting Disaster (2010) ==
In 2010, he published the book Courting Disaster: How the C.I.A. Kept America Safe and How Barack Obama Is Inviting the Next Attack, which defended the use of the torture technique waterboarding during the George W. Bush administration, arguing that it was not torture. He also wrote that the Obama administration's rejection of torture might lead to American deaths.

Thiessen's first book, Courting Disaster: How the CIA Kept America Safe and How Barack Obama Is Inviting the Next Attack, was published by Regnery Publishing in January 2010. In the book he argued that the CIA's systematic use of enhanced interrogation techniques was effective, lawful, and moral. The book was endorsed by the former Vice President Dick Cheney, former Secretary of Defense Donald Rumsfeld, and former Attorney General Michael Mukasey. It reached the No. 9 spot on the New York Times Best Sellers list for hardcover nonfiction in February 2010.

Jane Mayer, author of The Dark Side, heavily criticized Courting Disaster; in a book review in the New Yorker, Mayer wrote that Thiessen's book was "based on a series of slipshod premises" and was "better at conveying fear than at relaying the facts." In the book, Thiessen writes, "In the decade before the C.I.A. began interrogating captured terrorists, Al-Qaeda launched repeated attacks against America. In the eight years since the C.I.A. began interrogating captured terrorists, Al-Qaeda has not succeeded in launching one single attack on the homeland or American interests abroad." Mayer wrote, "This is not exactly a textbook demonstration of causality", and noted that Thiessen's claim was false anyway; Al-Qaeda had launched numerous attacks targeting Americans since the start of the torture program. Mayer ended her review with a criticism of the Obama administration for not convening a commission on the Bush administration's torture, thus allowing Thiessen and other proponents of torture to whitewash history.

The 6,700-page Senate Intelligence Committee report on CIA torture found that the CIA's enhanced interrogation program was not an effective method of gathering intelligence. The report was approved with seven Democrats, one Independent, and one Republican voting in favor, and six Republicans voting against.

A pseudonymous former military interrogator and author of How to Break a Terrorist, writing for Slate, characterized Thiessen's book as "a literary defense of war criminals" and criticized Thiessen for relying solely on the opinions of CIA interrogators.

== Personal life ==
Thiessen lives in Alexandria, Virginia, with his wife Pamela, who is the staff director of the United States Senate Republican Policy Committee. They have four children. He is a Catholic.
