= Carol Rasco =

American political aide (born 1948)

Director of the Domestic Policy Council
- In office January 20, 1993 – December 20, 1996
- President: Bill Clinton
- Preceded by: Roger B. Porter
- Succeeded by: Bruce Reed

Personal details
- Born: Carol Hampton; January 13, 1948 (age 78) Columbia, South Carolina, U.S.
- Party: Democratic
- Spouse: Terry Rasco
- Children: 2
- Education: Hendrix College (attended); University of Arkansas, Fayetteville (BS); University of Central Arkansas (MS)

Carol Rasco (née Hampton; born January 13, 1948) is an American political aide and advocate for disability rights, literacy, and children who served as Director of the Domestic Policy Council under President Bill Clinton from 1993 to 1996. She has been described as a trusted aide to the former president and governor and, during his absence due to his presidential campaign, was credited with running Arkansas' daily business. She cites her life experiences as the mother of a child with a disability as motivation for her political advocacy and influence and has most recently worked most with literacy projects.

== Early life and education ==
Rasco was born in Columbia, South Carolina, in 1948, to Frank Barnes Hampton, a pharmacist, and Ruby Hampton, a stay-at-home mother. The family returned to DeWitt, Arkansas, after Barnes returned to take over his family's drugstore.

Rasco skipped the 12th grade and enrolled in Hendrix College, though she would later transfer to the University of Arkansas, where she would graduate. She began as a drama major but later changed her major to education due to an interest in children's psychology. On campus, she became a member of Alpha Delta Pi sorority and also displayed an interest in politics. She was involved in fellow student Mack McLarty's campaign for student body president, who would become Clinton's chief of staff under the same administration in which she would work. She married husband Terry Rasco in 1969; the Rasco's were divorced in the fall of 1993.

After teaching for several years, Rasco went to the University of Central Arkansas for her master's degree in Elementary Couseling and Psychology, graduating in 1972. In Bryant, Arkansas, she set up a psychological counseling system for the public school system, where she would continue working when her first son was born.

== Career ==
=== Activism ===
In 1973, Rasco's son was born with cerebral palsy and brain damage, which she believed may possibly have been prevented if the hospital staff had been less inattentive and performed a Caesarean section to prevent a traumatic and extended labor. She states that working with her son's disability and development gave her "empathy with those who were reliant on government, from the elderly to young mothers on welfare." In 1981, she gave birth to a daughter. Rasco stated that, "as I began to learn about all the different agencies and entities you have to try to coordinate to raise a child like this, I became very interested in how we could better design systems to help children and families."

During her early career, Rasco taught elementary school in the public school system and was a middle school counselor. She volunteered with arts organizations, disability rights groups, and the United Methodist Church. In 1976, she met the Clintons during a coffee chat as Bill ran for state Attorney General, and she would later work with disability rights coalitions to lobby the Arkansas legislature to integrate and provide education for disabled children in school.

In 2001, she joined Reading Is Fundamental (RIF), the largest literacy non-profit organization in the United States, as its president and CEO that November. She had previously become familiar with the organization while implementing the America Reads Challenge, and while at the organization, its communications department encouraged her to start blogging. During her leadership, the organization experienced federal budget cuts, carried out significant research on summer reading loss and celebrated its 50th anniversary. In 2016, she retired from Reading Is Fundamental.In 2013, Rasco was recognized for her literacy work in the eighth annual Carle Honors.

=== Politics ===
Rasco began as the Director of Policy for the Arkansas Governor's Office, serving for ten years from the beginning of 1983 to the end of 1992. From 1985 to 1992, she served as Liaison to the National Governor's Association under Bill Clinton's terms as Arkansas governor; in this position, she worked primarily on child care, welfare reform, and healthcare reform, but in a profile by The New York Times, she was described as running "much of the state's daily business" during the year Clinton was absent campaigning for president. During these terms, she helped create consensus on welfare legislation and managed the state's human service policies during a federal lawsuit on insufficient and failing child welfare programs.

From 1993 to 1996, Rasco then served as Director of the Domestic Policy Council under President Clinton and also served on the United States Department of Education's Education Goals Panel. As a trusted aide to President Clinton, she played a role in immunization policy and continued to push for a more helpful government, especially towards families and for disability rights. She also influenced other areas of policy, such as family preservation, immigration, and healthcare coverage, and emphasized to her staff that policy should not forget individuals and reasons behind why individuals may be affected by an issue.

From 1997 to 2000, she became the senior adviser to United States Secretary of Education Richard Riley and became the director of Clinton's childhood literacy initiative, the America Reads Challenge, which she and Riley designed and implemented.

In 2001, Rasco briefly worked for College Board as a consultant on government relations before joining RIF.

Political offices
Preceded by Roger B. Porter	Director of the Domestic Policy Council; 1993–1996	Succeeded by Bruce Reed
