= Kill or Capture (Alexander book) =

2011 book by Matthew Alexander

Kill or Capture: How a Special Operations Task Force Took Down a Notorious al Qaeda Terrorist
- First edition
- Author: Matthew Alexander
- Publisher: Macmillan Publishing
- Publication date: 2011
- Publication place: United States
- Media type: Print
- Pages: 304
- ISBN: 9780312656874

Kill or Capture: How a Special Operations Task Force Took Down a Notorious al Qaeda Terrorist is a book published by Macmillan Publishing in early 2011. The author, a former interrogator, criticizes the use of "extended interrogation techniques". The author, who wrote under the pseudonym Matthew Alexander, was interviewed on National Public Radio on February 14, 2011.

He said

"The first step of any interrogation is to understand your detainee, understand what uniquely motivates them as an individual," [You have to understand] why they joined al-Qaida or another insurgent group, why they decided to pick up arms. And if you can analyze them and figure out those motivations, then you can craft an appropriate approach and incentive, but not until you've done that."

Alexander is also the author of How to Break a Terrorist: The U.S. Interrogators Who Used Brains, Not Brutality, to Take Down the Deadliest Man in Iraq. According to Jeff Stein, writing in The Washington Post, the author's real name was Anthony Camerino, a major in the United States Air Force Reserve. Steven E. Levingston, also writing in the Washington Post, asserted that the book describes how bad intelligence routinely lead to targeting the wrong individuals.
