= How to Break a Terrorist =

2008 book

How to Break a Terrorist: The US Interrogators Who Used Brains, Not Brutality, to Take Down the Deadliest Man in Iraq
- Author: Matthew Alexander (pseudonym)
- Publisher: St. Martin's Griffin
- Pages: 304
- ISBN: 9780312675110

How to Break a Terrorist: The US Interrogators Who Used Brains, Not Brutality, to Take Down the Deadliest Man in Iraq is a 2008 book written by an American airman who played a key role in tracking down Abu Musab al-Zarqawi.

== Background ==
The interrogator who wrote the book published it under the pen name Matthew Alexander, for security reasons. The author wrote the book as a pseudonymous officer in the US Air Force who had served for fourteen years. Alexander's real name has been sealed by court order by the District of Columbia District Court. Alexander makes television appearances under his pseudonym. According to Jeff Stein, writing in The Washington Post, the author's real name was Anthony Camerino, a Major in the United States Air Force Reserve. In an op-ed published in The Washington Post, Alexander wrote that after his arrival in Iraq in 2006 he found:

The Army was still conducting interrogations according to the Guantanamo Bay model: Interrogators were nominally using the methods outlined in the U.S. Army Field Manual, the interrogators' bible, but they were pushing in every way possible to bend the rules – and often break them.

The author has stated that when the Pentagon vetted the book they initially made 93 redactions.

I sued the Department of Defense first to review the book and then to argue the redactions, because they had redacted obvious unclassified material, things that I had taken straight out of the unclassified field manual and also some items that were directly off the Army's own website. So, eventually they acquiesced on eighty of the ninety-three redactions.

Alexander is an outspoken opponent of torture. He refutes the effectiveness of torture for interrogation, citing its negative long-term effects such as recruiting for Al-Qaeda. He also argues that torture is contrary to the American principles of freedom, liberty, and justice, and that should they resort to torture, American interrogators become the enemy they serve to defeat. Similar arguments have been made by other former interrogators from the U.S. military, FBI, and the CIA, including Colonel Steven Kleinman. In an interview with human rights lawyer Scott Horton for Harper's Magazine, Alexander said

The American public has a right to know that they do not have to choose between torture and terror. There is a better way to conduct interrogations that works more efficiently, keeps Americans safe, and doesn't sacrifice our integrity. Our greatest victory to date in this war, the death of Abu Musab Al Zarqawi (which saved thousands of lives and helped pave the way to the Sunni Awakening), was achieved using interrogation methods that had nothing to do with torture. The American people deserve to know that.

Alexander described Marc Thiessen's 2010 book Courting Disaster, which defended the use of torture (referred to euphemistically as enhanced interrogation techniques), as "a literary defense of war criminals".
