= T. Kenneth Cribb Jr. =

American activist (born 1948)

Ken Cribb
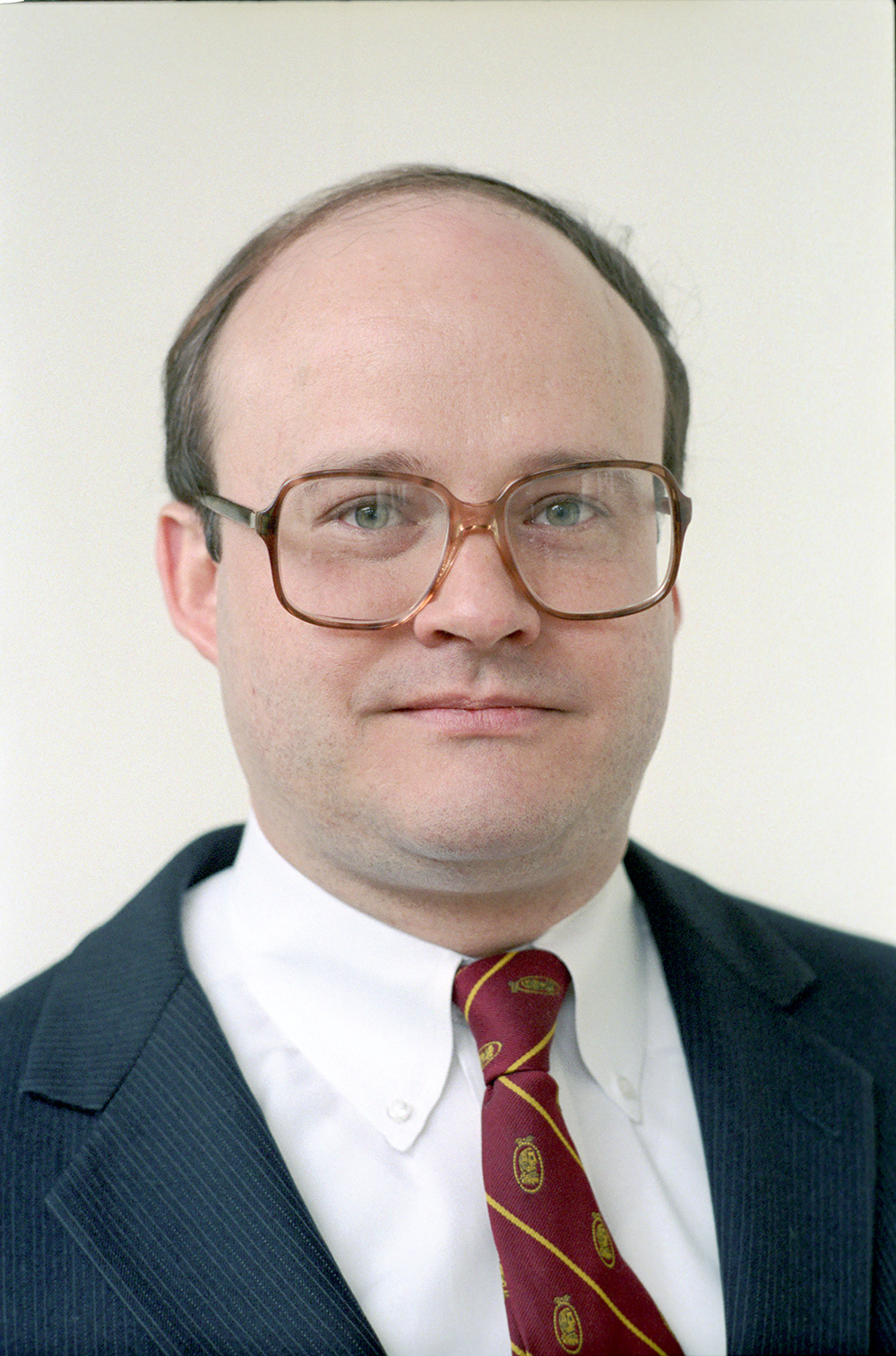

Director of the Domestic Policy Council
- In office March 30, 1987 – December 2, 1987
- President: Ronald Reagan
- Preceded by: Ralph Bledsoe
- Succeeded by: David McIntosh

Personal details
- Born: August 7, 1948 (age 77); Spartanburg, South Carolina, U.S.
- Political party: Republican
- Education: Washington and Lee University (BA); University of Virginia (JD)

Troy Kenneth "Ken" Cribb Jr. is a former presidential advisor to President Ronald Reagan.

== Early life and education ==
Cribb was born August 7, 1948, in Spartanburg, South Carolina. His parents were T. Kenneth Cribb Sr. and Dicksie Brown Cribb. His father was an agribusinessman, merchandising and marketing expert, civic and religious leader, a trustee of Clemson University, and held an honorary doctorate from the Universidad Francisco Marroquin.

Cribb attended Washington and Lee University, where he graduated in 1970. From 1971 to 1977, Cribb served as national director of the Intercollegiate Studies Institute. After that, he attended the University of Virginia Law School, where he graduated in 1980.

== Career ==
He was deputy to the chief counsel of the Reagan campaign the same year. After working as a Wall Street lawyer, he served as a counselor to the Attorney General and then as Assistant to the President for Domestic Affairs in the Reagan Administration.

He was president of the Intercollegiate Studies Institute from 1989 to 2011 and served on its board until May 2012. During his tenure, ISI expanded its educational programs. He also served as vice chairman of the Fulbright Foreign Scholarship Board from 1989 to 1992. He was also president of the Collegiate Network, an association of alternative college newspapers; president of the Council for National Policy, a conservative umbrella organization; member of the board of advisors for the Foundation for Individual Rights in Education; is counselor to the Federalist Society for Law and Public Policy, a conservative legal organization. Cribb also serves on the board of advisors of the Russell Kirk Center for Cultural Renewal, an educational organization that continues the intellectual legacy of noted conservative icon Russell Kirk, and on the Board of Visitors of Ralston College, a start-up liberal arts college in Savannah. He also served as president of the Philadelphia Society.

Cribb has been published in National Review, The American Spectator, The Intercollegiate Review, Modern Age, and Human Events.

Edwin Feulner, co-founder and former president of The Heritage Foundation, stated that "the conservative movement had no better friend in the highest councils of state during the Reagan era than Ken Cribb".

== Sources ==
- T. Kenneth Cribb Jr.: All American Colleges. Top Schools for Conservatives, Old-fashioned Liberals, And People of Faith, ISI Books 2006. ISBN 1-932236-88-0

Political offices
Preceded by Ralph Bledsoe	Director of the Domestic Policy Council; 1987	Succeeded by David McIntosh
