= Dan Crippen =

Director of the Congressional Budget Office (born 1952)

5th Director of the Congressional Budget Office
- In office February 3, 1999 – January 3, 2003
- Preceded by: Robert Reischauer
- Succeeded by: Douglas Holtz-Eakin

Director of the Domestic Policy Council
- In office September 8, 1988 – January 20, 1989
- President: Ronald Reagan
- Preceded by: David McIntosh
- Succeeded by: Roger Porter

Personal details
- Born: March 18, 1952 (age 74) Canistota, South Dakota, U.S.
- Party: Republican
- Education: University of South Dakota (BS); Ohio State University (MA, PhD)

Dan Crippen (born March 18, 1952, in Canistota, South Dakota) was the executive director of the National Governors Association from 2011 to 2015. A member of the Republican Party, he served as the director of the Congressional Budget Office from 1999 to 2003, and director of the Domestic Policy Council from 1988 to 1989.

== Reagan years ==
From 1981-1985 Crippen served as chief counsel and economic policy advisor for Senate Majority Leader Howard Baker. When Baker became President Reagan's Chief of Staff in 1987, Crippen followed Baker to the White House as Deputy Assistant to the President for Domestic Policy from 1987-1988 and Domestic Policy Advisor and Assistant to the President for Domestic Policy from 1988-1989. Republicans hoped that Crippen would be a strong proponent of Reagan's appropriations bills and that he could mend relations with Congress. After Reagan left office in 1989, Crippen turned to the private sector, as a principal of Washington Counsel (1996-1999), a law and lobbying firm; Merrill Lynch as an executive director; and The Duberstein Group, a public relations consulting firm, as founder and vice president.

== Congressional Budget Office ==
He was Director of the Congressional Budget Office from 1999-02-01 to 2003. Republican leaders selected Crippen as a somewhat moderate candidate, drawing the ire of members of both parties, who sought a more ideological director. A 2003 article in The Wall Street Journal suggested that he may have lost his chance at reappointment for failing to support dynamic scoring, a practice inspired by supply-side economics.

== NASA and present day ==
On July 28, 2004 NASA Administrator Sean O'Keefe selected him to serve on NASA's Aerospace Safety Advisory Panel (ASAP).

He was also a member of the Stafford-Covey Return to Flight Task Group, which helped set policies to return the Space Shuttle to flight after the Space Shuttle Columbia disaster.

In February 2005, he was briefly mentioned as a possible NASA Administrator.

Crippen still works in the private sector, largely focusing on healthcare issues, and does some public speaking. In a 2005 editorial in The Washington Post, Crippen called for increased use of technology to reduce healthcare costs, altering the service structure by delegating more services to nurses and other hospital staff, and studying the subset of the Medicare population which uses the majority of the resources. In early 2011, Crippen was named executive director of the National Governors Association. He served in that position until 2015. He also served on the board of directors of the Committee for a Responsible Federal Budget.

In 2012 Crippen was elected a fellow of the National Academy of Public Administration.

== Notes or references ==
Political offices
Preceded by David McIntosh	Director of the Domestic Policy Council; 1988–1989	Succeeded by Roger Porter
Government offices
Preceded by James Blum; Acting	Director of the Congressional Budget Office; 1999–2003	Succeeded by Barry Anderson; Acting
