= Roger B. Porter =

American professor

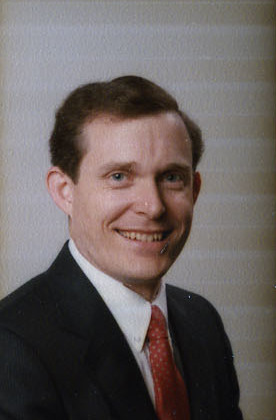
- Porter in 1983

Director of the Domestic Policy Council
- In office January 20, 1989 – January 20, 1993
- President: George H. W. Bush
- Preceded by: Dan Crippen
- Succeeded by: Carol Rasco

Personal details
- Born: Roger Blaine Porter; June 19, 1946 (age 79) Provo, Utah, U.S.
- Party: Republican
- Spouse: Ann Robinson
- Children: Rob Porter
- Education: Brigham Young University, Utah (BA); Queen's College, Oxford (BPhil); Harvard University (MA, PhD)

Roger Blaine Porter (born June 19, 1946) is an American professor, who served as of 2011 as the IBM Professor of Business and Government at Harvard University. He was the master of Dunster House, one of the twelve undergraduate houses or colleges at Harvard. He was also a senior scholar at the Woodrow Wilson International Center for Scholars in Washington, D.C. As of 2018 he was on the board of directors of Zions Bancorporation, a large bank holding company headquartered in Salt Lake City, Utah.

== Early life ==
Porter grew up in Utah, Iowa, and New York and attended Brigham Young High School in Provo, Utah. He attended Brigham Young University (BYU) for two years and was a member of the varsity men's tennis team before serving a mission for the Church of Jesus Christ of Latter-day Saints in the United Kingdom. He received his B.A. from BYU and was selected as a Rhodes Scholar and a Woodrow Wilson Fellow earning a B.Phil. from Oxford University. He earned his M.A. and Ph.D. from Harvard University.

== Career ==
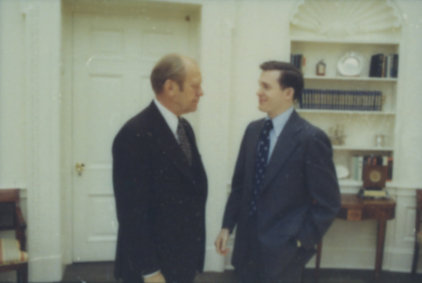
Porter with Gerald Ford in 1976

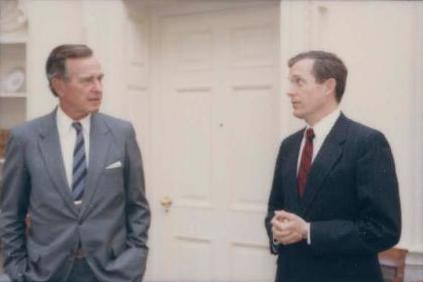
Porter with George H. W. Bush in 1990

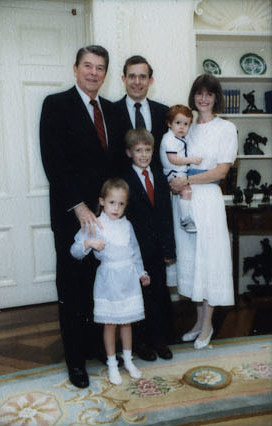
The Porter family with Ronald Reagan in 1985

Porter was selected as a White House Fellow (1974–75) and served as Special Assistant to the President and Executive Secretary of the President's Economic Policy Board (1974–77) in the Ford White House. He joined the faculty at Harvard Kennedy School at Harvard University in 1977.

Porter returned to government service at the beginning of Ronald Reagan's administration, serving as executive secretary of the Cabinet Council on Economic Affairs and as director of White House Office of Policy Development. He rejoined the Harvard faculty in the fall of 1985 as the IBM Professor of Business and Government and faculty chair of the Senior Managers in Government Program. He returned to the White House at the beginning of George H. W. Bush's administration, where he served as Assistant to the President for Economic and Domestic Policy from 1989 to 1993.

Porter has twice served as director of the Mossavar-Rahmani Center for Business and Government at Harvard (1995–2000 and 2008–11). His teaching and research interests range widely. In 1987 he began teaching Harvard's course on "The American Presidency" pioneered by Richard Neustadt and later taught by Doris Kearns Goodwin; he has taught the course ever since except for the years when he was serving in the White House. He also teaches a large graduate course on "The Business-Government Relationship in the United States" as well as courses and modules on managing policy development, decision making, and economic policy.

His books include Presidential Decision Making, The U.S.-U.S.S.R. Grain Agreement, and edited volumes on Efficiency, Equity, and Legitimacy: The Multilateral Trading System at the Millennium, and most recently, New Directions in Financial Services Regulation.

He is a member of the President's Commission on White House Fellows, a member of the board of directors of the White House Historical Association, a trustee of the Gerald R. Ford Foundation, and a member of the advisory board of The Bush School of Government and Public Service at Texas A&M University.

== Personal life ==
Porter's son is Rob Porter, former staff secretary in the Trump Administration, who was ousted in February 2018 due to domestic violence allegations.

== Works ==
- Presidential Decision Making
- The U.S.-U.S.S.R. Grain Agreement
- Foreign Economic Policymaking in the United States: An Approach for the 1990s (with Raymond Vernon)
- Seattle, the WTO, and the Future of the Multilateral Trading System (edited with Pierre Sauve)
- Efficiency, Equity, Legitimacy: The Multilateral Trading System at the Millennium (edited with Pierre Sauve, Arvind Subramanian and Americo Beviglia Zampetti)
- New Directions in Financial Services Regulation (edited with Robert R. Glauber and Thomas J. Healey)

Political offices
| Preceded by Dan Crippen | Director of the Domestic Policy Council; 1989–1993 | Succeeded by Carol Rasco |
