= Ross Worthington =

American speechwriter (born 1988/1989)

White House Director of Speechwriting
- Incumbent
- Assumed office January 20, 2025
- President: Donald Trump
- Preceded by: Vinay Reddy

Personal details
- Born: Ross Worthington; 1988 or 1989 (age 37–38)
- Party: Republican
- Education: Brown University (BA)

Ross Worthington (born 1988 or 1989) is an American speechwriter who has served as the White House director of speechwriting since 2025.

Worthington graduated from Brown University in 2011. He worked for Newt Gingrich's 2012 presidential campaign as his deputy communications director and co-wrote a book with Gingrich in 2013. In December 2016, Worthington was hired as a speechwriter for President-elect Donald Trump. With Vince Haley, he co-wrote several of Trump's speeches in his first term, including the 2018, 2019, and 2020 State of the Union Addresses. Worthington worked for Trump's 2024 presidential campaign and helped him prepare for debates.

In January 2025, Trump named Worthington as the White House director of speechwriting.

== Early life and education (1988/1989–2011) ==
Ross Worthington was born in 1988 or 1989. He graduated from Brown University in 2011.

== Career ==
=== Deputy communications director (2011–2012) ===
Worthington served as the deputy communications director for Newt Gingrich's 2012 presidential campaign.

=== Trump speechwriter (2017–2021) ===
In December 2016, Politico reported that Worthington had been hired as a speechwriter for president-elect Donald Trump. In the Trump administration, he and Vince Haley proposed the idea of cities chartered on federal land. With Haley, Worthington assisted Stephen Miller and Rob Porter in writing the 2018 State of the Union Address. Haley and Worthington co-wrote the 2019 State of the Union Address—with Miller working to develop the speech in Trump's voice—and the 2020 State of the Union Address. Worthington helped draft the speech that Trump delivered prior to the January 6 Capitol attack; he was later subpoenaed by the House Select Committee to Investigate the January 6th Attack on the United States Capitol. By April 2022, Worthington had testified before the committee.

=== Post-government work (2021–2024) ===
By January, Haley and Worthington were on the payroll for Trump's 2024 presidential campaign. They largely wrote Agenda 47, Trump's agenda that includes provisions expanding presidential authority. Worthington helped Trump prepare for his debate with President Joe Biden, as well as with Vice President Kamala Harris, and helped write the Republican National Committee's platform.

=== White House director of speechwriting (2025–present) ===
In January 2025, Politico reported that Trump had named Worthington as the White House director of speechwriting. With Haley, he co-wrote Trump's inaugural address and Trump's speech to a joint session of Congress.

== Views ==
Worthington co-wrote Breakout: Pioneers of the Future, Prison Guards of the Past, and the Epic Battle That Will Decide America's Fate (2013) with Newt Gingrich.

In an article for The Federalist in 2014, Worthington criticized liberalism on university campuses. During his deposition by the House Select Committee to Investigate the January 6th Attack on the United States Capitol, he stated that he believed the January 6 Capitol attack was a "protest that got out of control."

== Works cited ==
- Arnsdorf, Isaac; Stein, Jeff (April 21, 2023). "Trump touts authoritarian vision for second term: 'I am your justice'". The Washington Post.
- Broadwater, Luke; Feuer, Alan (January 11, 2022). "Jan. 6 Panel Seeks to Debunk Unfounded Theory About F.B.I. Role in Riot". The New York Times.
- Cai, Sophia; Burns, Dasha (January 14, 2025). "Trump hires policy-focused head speechwriter". Politico.
- Faulders, Katherine; Scott, Rachel (March 3, 2025). "Trump prepares 'Renewal of the American Dream' speech". ABC News.
- Haberman, Maggie; Broadwater, Luke (April 14, 2022). "Jan. 6 Panel Presses Stephen Miller on Whether Trump Sought to Incite Crowd". The New York Times.
- Haberman, Maggie; Swan, Jonathan (June 14, 2024). "Trump Participates in His Form of Debate Prep, Readying to Face Biden". The New York Times.
- McGowan, Dan (January 15, 2025). "Trump's top speechwriter is a Brown University graduate". The Boston Globe.
- McGraw, Meridith; Ward, Myah; Cadelago, Christopher; Schneider, Elena (September 10, 2024). "Trump confronts his 'weak spot' at the debate". Politico.
- Orr, Gabby; Restuccia, Andrew (January 31, 2019). "Trump to throw spotlight on abortion in State of the Union". Politico.
- Piper, Jessica; McGraw, Meridith (January 31, 2023). "Trump committee burns through cash in early months, new filings show". Politico.
- Restuccia, Andrew (January 21, 2018). "Shutdown politics weigh on State of the Union preparations". Politico.
- Rogers, Katie (February 3, 2020). "The State of the Union Is Trump's Biggest Speech. Who Writes It?". The New York Times.
- Sherman, Jake; Palmer, Anna; Lippman, Daniel (December 29, 2016). "Who gets credit for Sprint's new U.S. jobs". Politico.
- Siders, David (January 19, 2025). "Why Trump supporters see sunshine in Trump's dark and foreboding speeches". Politico.
- Swan, Jonathan; Savage, Charlie; Haberman, Maggie (July 17, 2023). "Trump and Allies Forge Plans to Increase Presidential Power in 2025". The New York Times.
- Swan, Jonathan; Goldmacher, Shane; Haberman, Maggie (July 18, 2024). "How Trump Dominated His Own Party on a New G.O.P. Platform". The New York Times.
