= Kill or Capture (Klaidman book) =

2012 book by Daniel Klaidman

Kill or Capture: The War on Terror and the Soul of the Obama Presidency
- First edition
- Author: Daniel Klaidman
- Language: English
- Publisher: Houghton Mifflin Harcourt
- Publication date: 2012
- Pages: 304
- ISBN: 978-0-547-54789-3

Kill or Capture: The War on Terror and the Soul of the Obama Presidency is a book by Daniel Klaidman, published in June 2012. The book describes the United States Government's tactics for dealing with individuals suspected of a role in supporting terrorists who have targeted or plan to target the United States.

According to Michael Petrou, writing in Maclean's magazine, "This book is about the clash between President Barack Obama’s pre-election idealism on matters of security and terrorism, and the more pragmatic realities of office.".

Commenting on President Barack Obama's decision to authorize the killing United States citizen Anwar Awlaki via a missile fired by an unmanned aerial vehicle Steve Coll wrote:

Klaidman has reported what would appear to be the first instance in American history of a sitting President speaking of his intent to kill a particular U.S. citizen without that citizen having been charged formally with a crime or convicted at trial.
