= Vince Haley =

American speechwriter and political advisor

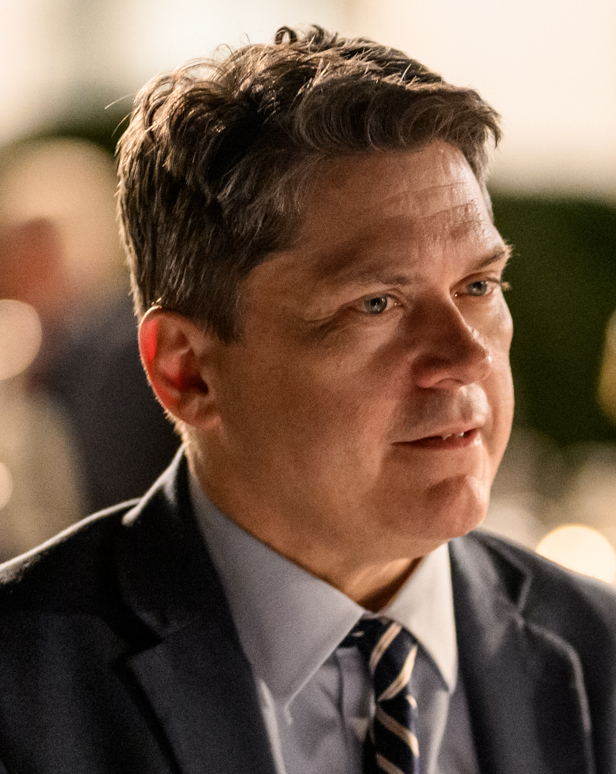
- Haley in 2025

Director of the Domestic Policy Council
- Incumbent
- Assumed office January 20, 2025
- President: Donald Trump
- Preceded by: Neera Tanden

Personal details
- Born: 1966 or 1967 (age 59–60) Virginia, U.S.
- Party: Republican
- Education: College of William and Mary (BA); University of Virginia (MA, JD); College of Europe (LLM)

Vince Haley (born 1966 or 1967) is an American speechwriter and political advisor. He is the current director of the Domestic Policy Council and assumed office in January 2025 as part of the second Donald Trump administration.

== Early life and education ==
Haley was born in 1966 or 1967 in Virginia, as the youngest of 11 children; he has a twin sister. He attended the College of William & Mary where he received a bachelor's degree, and later earned a Juris Doctor degree and a master's degree from the University of Virginia, as well as a Master of Laws degree from the College of Europe.

== Career ==
After receiving his education, Haley practiced law in New York and San Francisco. He left law to work in politics following the September 11 attacks in 2001. He worked closely for over a decade with former Speaker of the House Newt Gingrich. He served as the vice president of policy for Gingrich's American Solutions organization and also worked as a research director for the American Enterprise Institute and as a researcher for the National Republican Senatorial Committee.

Haley co-authored multiple books with Gingrich and also worked on his documentary film Ronald Reagan: Rendezvous with Destiny, serving as an associate producer. When Gingrich ran for president in 2012, Haley served as his campaign manager. Haley also served as vice president of special projects at the Gingrich Productions media company.

Haley ran for the Virginia Senate in 2015 to succeed the retiring Republican Walter Stosch. He received 22% of the vote in the Republican primary and was defeated by Siobhan Dunnavant. In 2016, he worked for Donald Trump's presidential campaign. After Trump won the election, Haley was appointed to his White House policy team, working under senior advisor Stephen Miller in the role of advisor for policy, strategy and speechwriting. Haley and Ross Worthington served as the two main speechwriters for Trump during his presidency, including developing Trump's State of the Union addresses.

Haley and Worthington remained Trump's main speechwriters by 2024, working for his 2024 presidential campaign. After Trump won the 2024 election, Haley was appointed to be the director of the United States Domestic Policy Council, a post that "oversees the development and implementation of the president's domestic policies across the federal government." In a press release, Trump described Haley as "very well-educated and [having] a brilliant mind for policies that work for the American people."

On December 16, 2025, Trump announced that Haley was to be in charge of the Memorial Circle arch project.

== Personal life ==
Haley lives in Henrico County, Virginia, and is married, having four children with his wife, Bethany.

Political offices
Preceded by Neera Tanden	Director of the Domestic Policy Council; 2025–present	Incumbent
