= United States Domestic Policy Council =

US presidential advisory body for social and human rights issues

Domestic Policy Council

Agency overview
- Formed: August 16, 1993
- Jurisdiction: Federal Government of the United States
- Headquarters: Eisenhower Executive Office Building
- Employees: 25
- Agency executive: Vince Haley, Assistant to the President for Domestic Policy
- Parent agency: Office of White House Policy, Executive Office of the President of the United States
- Website: Official website

The Domestic Policy Council (DPC) is the principal forum used by the president of the United States for the consideration of domestic policy matters and senior policymaking, and includes Cabinet members and White House officials. The council is part of the Office of Policy Development, which itself is within the Executive Office of the President of the United States.

Since the establishment of the Council in 1993, under the administration of President Bill Clinton, its purpose is to coordinate the domestic policy-making process, coordinate domestic policy advice to the president, ensure that domestic policy decisions and programs are consistent with the president’s stated goals, ensure that those goals are being effectively pursued, and monitor the implementation of the president’s domestic policy agenda.

The Domestic Policy Council differs from the National Economic Council, which is used to consider economic policy for the president. The Domestic Policy Council focuses on issues of domestic policy, which exclude economic policy matters. The council is also the principal arm of the president when coordinating domestic policy measures throughout the executive branch.

The Domestic Policy Council is headed by the assistant to the president for domestic policy and director of the Domestic Policy Council. Since January 20, 2025, that position has been held by Vince Haley.

== History and mission ==
The Domestic Policy Council was established on August 16, 1993 by Executive Order 12859, under President Clinton. The first director of the Domestic Policy Council was Carol Rasco, who was appointed by Clinton in 1993. The council oversees development and implementation of the president’s domestic policy agenda and ensures coordination and communication among the heads of relevant Federal offices and agencies.

Prior to the creation of the National Economic Council, economic policy staff had existed since the 1960s. President Lyndon Johnson assigned a senior aide to develop and organize domestic policy, of which economic policy was included. In 1970, President Richard Nixon issued an executive order which created the Office of Policy Development. President Clinton split the responsibilities of the Domestic Policy Council with the National Economic Council.

The council is composed of various Cabinet officials, who advise the president on domestic policy issues and matters.

== Assistants to the President for Domestic Policy ==
Denotes acting capacity.

Image	Name	Start	End	President
	Joe Califano	July 26, 1965	January 20, 1969	Lyndon B. Johnson (1963–1969)
	Pat Moynihan; Urban Affairs	January 23, 1969	November 4, 1969	Richard Nixon (1969–1974)
	John Ehrlichman	November 4, 1969	April 30, 1973	Richard Nixon (1969–1974)
	Mel Laird	May 1, 1973	January 8, 1974	Richard Nixon (1969–1974)
	Ken Cole	January 8, 1974	February 28, 1975	Richard Nixon (1969–1974)
	Ken Cole	January 8, 1974	February 28, 1975	Gerald Ford (1974–1977)
	James Cannon	February 28, 1975	January 20, 1977	Gerald Ford (1974–1977)
	Stu Eizenstat	January 20, 1977	January 20, 1981	Jimmy Carter (1977–1981)
Vacant		January 20, 1981	June 20, 1985	Ronald Reagan (1981–1989)
	Ralph Bledsoe	June 20, 1985	March 30, 1987	Ronald Reagan (1981–1989)
	Ken Cribb	March 30, 1987	December 2, 1987	Ronald Reagan (1981–1989)
	David McIntosh	December 2, 1987	September 8, 1988	Ronald Reagan (1981–1989)
	Dan Crippen	September 8, 1988	January 20, 1989	Ronald Reagan (1981–1989)
	Roger Porter	January 20, 1989	January 20, 1993	George H. W. Bush (1989–1993)
	Carol Rasco	January 20, 1993	December 20, 1996	Bill Clinton (1993–2001)
	Bruce Reed	December 20, 1996	January 20, 2001	Bill Clinton (1993–2001)
	John Bridgeland	January 20, 2001	January 30, 2002	George W. Bush (2001–2009)
	Margaret Spellings	January 30, 2002	January 5, 2005	George W. Bush (2001–2009)
	Claude Allen	January 5, 2005	February 9, 2006	George W. Bush (2001–2009)
	Karl Zinsmeister	May 24, 2006	January 20, 2009	George W. Bush (2001–2009)
	Melody Barnes	January 20, 2009	January 10, 2012	Barack Obama (2009–2017)
	Cecilia Muñoz	January 10, 2012	January 20, 2017	Barack Obama (2009–2017)
	Andrew Bremberg	January 20, 2017	February 2, 2019	Donald Trump (2017–2021)
	Joe Grogan	February 2, 2019	May 24, 2020	Donald Trump (2017–2021)
	Brooke Rollins; Acting	May 24, 2020	January 20, 2021	Donald Trump (2017–2021)
	Susan Rice	January 20, 2021	May 26, 2023	Joe Biden (2021–2025)
	Neera Tanden	May 26, 2023	January 20, 2025	Joe Biden (2021–2025)
	Vince Haley	January 20, 2025	Incumbent	Donald Trump (2025–present)
