= Steven Kleinman =

United States Air Force officer

- Kleinman in 2007
- Military career
- Allegiance: United States
- Branch: United States Air Force
- Rank: Colonel

Steven Kleinman served as an intelligence officer and is a recognized expert in the fields of human intelligence, special operations, and special survival training.

During his nearly 30 years of active and Reserve military service, he became widely recognized as one of the most accomplished human intelligence officers in the Department of Defense (DoD) with expertise and experience that spanned the scope of the discipline. His deployments include Operation Just Cause, Operation Desert Shield/Storm, Operation Iraqi Freedom, and the Global War on Terrorism. Kleinman was assigned as a senior intelligence officer at several Air Force and Joint commands, including as the Director of Intelligence at the Personnel Recovery Academy (a unit of the Joint Personnel Recovery Agency — JPRA — that is the as DoD agency responsible for Survival, Evasion, Resistance, and Escape — SERE — training for U.S. military personnel) and as a Reserve Senior Intelligence Officer at the Air Force Special Operations Command (AFSOC) and Central Command (CENTCOM).

In 2003, he was chosen to lead a JPRA team to assist a task force involved in the questioning of Iraqi insurgents. Upon his arrival, he encountered the systematic employment of a coercive interrogation tactics. A Senate Armed Services report released in 2008 lauded then Lieutenant Colonel Kleinman for being the only officer who took action to stop the use of these tactics.

Kleinman was the first military officers to offer a strong public case against the use of coercive interrogation practices. He offered a systematic argument—based on moral, legal, and operational considerations—that torture had no place in American intelligence doctrine.

The colonel has worked continuously to change American interrogation protocols for more than a decade. During his deployment to Iraq in 2003, when the Iraqi insurgency was growing and the Pentagon demanded better intelligence, he witnessed firsthand how the system began to promote "brutal and humiliating measures." Kleinman has argued that a central reason for the push beyond previous legal and moral boundaries stems from the critical shortcomings in the Army Field Manual on interrogation. Many of the methods set forth in the manual, he contends, lack any measure of objective evidence to substantiate their effectiveness in eliciting reliable information. While the Bush Administration moved to update the manual in 2006—and added new restrictions on abusive treatment of detainees—there was, Kleinman maintains, "no effort to objectively test the efficacy of the approaches.” Colonel Kleinman testified before Congress in 2007 in an effort to call attention to this enduring problem and insisted that the interrogation manual be replaced. His proposals, however, were largely ignored.

Kleinman testified before the Senate Armed Services Committee of the United States Senate about the use of interrogation techniques which exceeded those allowed by law. He specifically cited the employment of harsh interrogation methods that were previously reserved for use in programs designed to train U.S. military personnel to resist interrogation if held by countries that were not signatories to the Geneva Convention. Those techniques, to include forced nudity, sleep deprivation, and painful shackling, were being used on Iraqi detainees. "It had morphed into a form of punishment for those who wouldn't cooperate," he told the Senate panel. Discovering the use of such measures in Iraq in 2003 prompted him to order a stop to such interrogations and to warn his superiors that these interrogation practices were abusive and, in his opinion, illegal.

Kleinman was a senior advisor for a major study into interrogation commissioned by the Intelligence Science Board, a research entity under the Office of the Director of National Intelligence, and wrote two of the chapters that appeared in the study's final report. The findings set forth in this report described the harsh interrogation techniques used again detainees since 9/11 as "outmoded, amateurish, and unreliable.

Colonel Kleinman has observed that while the U.S. Government has spent billions on spy satellites, very little has been invested in a formal study of the art and science of interrogation. This, he has noted, is in spite of the fact that there is a broad consensus that interrogation might be the best source of information on an elusive, low-tech, stateless foe like Al Qaeda.

On November 8, 2007 Kleinman testified before the Committee on the Judiciary Subcommittee on Constitution, Civil Rights, and Civil Liberties of the US House of Representatives:

"[M]any Americans, understandably angry and seeking some manner of revenge after the vicious attacks of 9/11, have fallen prey to the proposition that excessive physical, psychological, and emotional pressures are necessary to compel terrorists or insurgents to answer an interrogator's questions. Further, this form of interrogation is too often viewed as an inevitable and appropriate means of punishment the detainees deserve for their malicious acts. Such beliefs are equally untrue... [C]oercion is decidedly ineffective. Coercive interrogation methods are wholly counterproductive in winning the hearts and minds of detainees and, I might add, the populations from which they emerge. Instead, coercive methods are almost certain to create what is perhaps the most callous form of degradation one human can inflict upon another: humiliation. Humiliation is an inevitable product of any form of torture".

In July 2013, Colonel Kleinman was awarded the 2013 "Practitioner Excellence" award by the International Investigative Interviewing Research Group (iIIRG) during that organization's conference held in Maastricht, the Netherlands. This award recognized both his "outstanding achievements to the area of ethical investigative interviewing" and his emphatic public stance against torture and coercion.

Since 2003, Colonel Kleinman has worked continuously to change the American interrogation protocol to one that is evidence-based, operationally sound, and human rights compliant. To achieve that objective, he has called for a complete review and revision of the Army Field Manual on interrogation. While the latest version published in 2006 placed restrictions on abuse, he asserts "there was no effort to objectively test the efficacy of the approaches [interrogaton strategies]." He supported passage of the McCain-Feinstein amendment to the National Defense Authorization Act in June 2015, which includes provisions that require a complete review of the Army Field Manual on interrogation and ensures representatives of the International Committee of the Red Cross have access to all detainees in U.S. custody, because ″passing strongly worded legislation that would stand as a bulwark against torture is the single most important step we must take.″.

In 2014, Colonel Kleinman was named one of "Nine Heroes Who Stood Up Against Torture" by Human Rights First.
