= White House Director of Speechwriting =

Political aide to the U.S. President

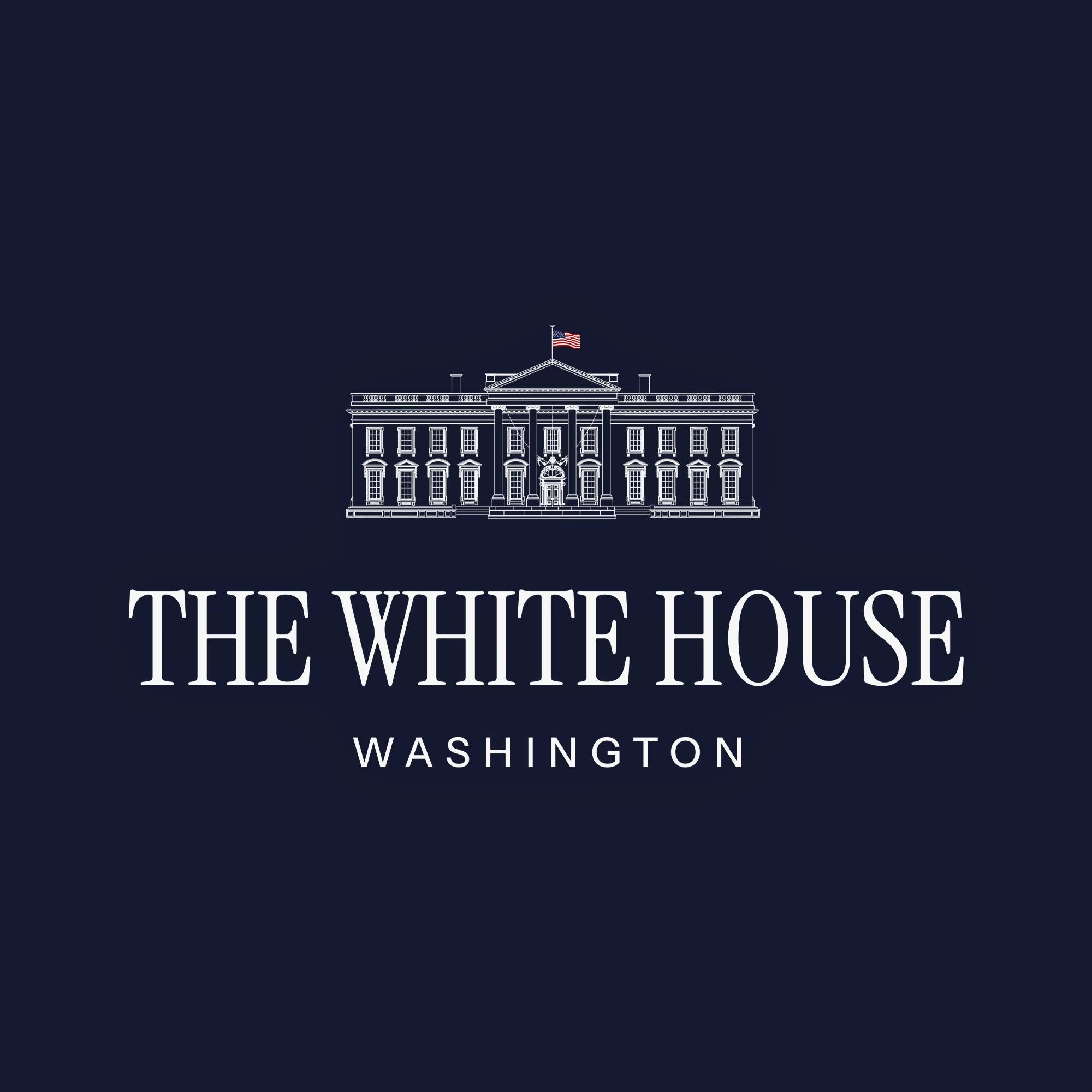
- Incumbent; Ross Worthington since January 20, 2025
- Executive Office of the President; White House Office
- Appointer: President of the United States

The White House director of speechwriting is a role within the Executive Office of the President of the United States. The officeholder serves as senior advisor and chief speechwriter to the president of the United States. They are also responsible for managing the Office of Speechwriting within the Office of Communications.

== List ==
Denotes acting capacity.

| Image | Name | Start | End | President |
|---|---|---|---|---|
| | Stephen Harmelin | 1964 | 1965 | Lyndon Johnson (1963–1969) |
| | Harry McPherson | October 26, 1967 | January 20, 1969 | Lyndon Johnson (1963–1969) |
| | Jim Keogh | January 20, 1969 | December 31, 1970 | Richard Nixon (1969–1974) |
| | Ray Price | December 31, 1970 | February 6, 1973 | Richard Nixon (1969–1974) |
| | David Gergen | February 6, 1973 | August 9, 1974 | Richard Nixon (1969–1974) |
| | Bob Hartmann | August 9, 1974 | January 20, 1977 | Gerald Ford (1974–1977) |
| | Jim Fallows | January 20, 1977 | November 24, 1978 | Jimmy Carter (1977–1981) |
| | Bernie Aronson | November 24, 1978 | January 20, 1981 | Jimmy Carter (1977–1981) |
| | Ken Khachigian | January 20, 1981 | May 3, 1981 | Ronald Reagan (1981–1989) |
| | Tony Dolan | May 3, 1981 | November 17, 1981 | Ronald Reagan (1981–1989) |
| | Tony Dolan | November 17, 1981 | January 20, 1989 | Ronald Reagan (1981–1989) |
| | Aram Bakshian | November 17, 1981 | October 19, 1983 | Ronald Reagan (1981–1989) |
| | Ben Elliott | October 19, 1983 | June 6, 1986 | Ronald Reagan (1981–1989) |
| | Chriss Winston | January 20, 1989 | February 19, 1991 | George H. W. Bush (1989–1993) |
| | Tony Snow | February 19, 1991 | January 20, 1993 | George H. W. Bush (1989–1993) |
| | David Kusnet | January 20, 1993 | March 9, 1994 | Bill Clinton (1993–2001) |
| | Don Baer | March 9, 1994 | August 14, 1995 | Bill Clinton (1993–2001) |
| | Michael Waldman | December 22, 1995 | August 9, 1999 | Bill Clinton (1993–2001) |
| | Terry Edmonds | August 9, 1999 | January 20, 2001 | Bill Clinton (1993–2001) |
| | Mike Gerson | January 20, 2001 | June 14, 2006 | George W. Bush (2001–2009) |
| | Bill McGurn | June 14, 2006 | December 14, 2007 | George W. Bush (2001–2009) |
| | Marc Thiessen | December 14, 2007 | January 20, 2009 | George W. Bush (2001–2009) |
| | Jon Favreau | January 20, 2009 | March 1, 2013 | Barack Obama (2009–2017) |
| | Cody Keenan | March 1, 2013 | January 20, 2017 | Barack Obama (2009–2017) |
| | Stephen Miller | January 20, 2017 | January 20, 2021 | Donald Trump (2017–2021) |
| | Vinay Reddy | January 20, 2021 | January 20, 2025 | Joe Biden (2021–2025) |
| | Ross Worthington | January 20, 2025 | Incumbent | Donald Trump (2025–present) |
