= Jeff Stein (author) =

American editor and journalist

- Born: February 13, 1944 (age 82); Philadelphia, Pennsylvania, U.S.
- Occupations: Investigative reporter, columnist, non-fiction author
- Writing career
- Period: 1973–present
- Genres: U.S. intelligence, defense and foreign policy issues

Jeff Stein (born February 13, 1944) is the editor-in-chief of SpyTalk, a newsletter covering U.S. intelligence, defense and foreign policy, on the Substack platform. Previously, he was the SpyTalk columnist (and national security correspondent) at Newsweek, and before that, the SpyTalk blogger at The Washington Post. From 2002 to 2009, he was the founding editor of CQ/Homeland Security, and later national security editor at Congressional Quarterly, where he first launched his SpyTalk column. He had already covered the spy agencies and national policy topics for decades.

== Biography ==
Stein was born in Philadelphia but grew up in New England, moving with his family to Maine in 1954. After attending school in Providence, Rhode Island, he moved to Hingham, Massachusetts, where he graduated from high school in 1962. Following high school, he attended Boston University, earning a bachelor's degree in American history. Stein then attended the University of California, Berkeley, for a master's degree in China studies. He entered the U.S. Army in 1967 and served with U.S. Army Intelligence as a case officer from 1968 to 1969. While stationed in Vietnam, he was awarded a Bronze Star.

Stein began his journalism career at a suburban Washington, D.C. weekly. He reported for NPR during its early years, while freelancing for major newspapers and magazines. In 1981, he briefly edited the Washington City Paper before founding his own paper, The Washington Weekly, which folded in 1984, after a year of publication. He then joined United Press International (UPI), rising to deputy foreign editor. During this period he also wrote his first book, The Vietnam Factbook, published in 1987. In 1992, Stein followed up with A Murder in Wartime, a book which detailed a Green Beret murder case that occurred during the Vietnam War.

In the 1990s, Stein began writing for Salon.com eventually becoming a national security correspondent. In 2000, alongside Khidhir Hamza, a scientist who worked on Saddam Hussein's nuclear program before defecting in 1994, Stein wrote Saddam's Bombmaker. In 2002, Congressional Quarterly hired Stein to launch and edit CQ/Homeland Security which was nominated for an award in its first year of existence.

In 2005, Stein began writing a weekly column for CQ, entitled "SpyTalk", which evolved into a daily blog. In October 2006, Stein wrote in The New York Times that many top counter-terrorism officials and members of the House Intelligence Committee did not know the difference between Sunnis and Shiites. In April 2009, Stein, writing for CQ Politics, broke the story that Representative Jane Harman had been wiretapped discussing aid for AIPAC defendants. The scandal brought additional attention to the NSA warrantless surveillance controversy and implicated a number of other figures.

In addition to his SpyTalk work, Stein continues to write op-ed pieces and book reviews for The New York Times and The Washington Post. He has also written for other publications, including Esquire, Vanity Fair, GQ, Playboy, The New Republic, The Nation and The Christian Science Monitor. He also appears on CBS, CNN, MSNBC, NPR and BBC, among others, to comment on U.S. national security issues.

== Personal life ==
Stein resides in Northwest Washington, DC, in a restored Victorian era farmhouse. He is a member of both the Association of Former Intelligence Officers and Investigative Reporters and Editors.

== Books ==
- Saddam's Bombmaker:The Daring Escape of the Man Who Built Iraq's Secret Weapon — 2000 (with Khidhir Hamza) ISBN 0-7432-1135-9
- A Murder in Wartime: The Untold Spy Story That Changed the Course of the Vietnam War — 1992 ISBN 0-312-92919-6
- The Vietnam Factbook — 1987 ISBN 0-440-19336-2
