= List of The Masked Singer (American TV series) episodes =

The Masked Singer is an American reality singing competition television series based on the South Korean television program King of Mask Singer. The show, which involves celebrities singing anonymously in elaborate full-body costumes, was developed by Craig Plestis and is hosted by Nick Cannon. During most episodes, three to six celebrities each perform covers of famous songs in costume in front of a studio audience and panelists Ken Jeong, Jenny McCarthy Wahlberg, Rita Ora, Robin Thicke, and formerly Nicole Scherzinger. After the audience and panelists vote for their favorite performance, the celebrity with the fewest votes is eliminated from the competition and takes off their mask, revealing their identity.

The series has been broadcast on Fox since January 2, 2019, and has aired fourteen seasons thus far. Plestis and Izzie Pick Ibarra have served as executive producers since the first season; Rosie Seitchik and Cannon have also done so since the second and third, respectively. As the highest-rated entertainment series in the adults 18–49 key demographic both television seasons it has aired, the program's ratings have remained consistently high. Owing to its success, an aftershow, The Masked Singer: After the Mask, was formed as a spin-off. The series's costume designer has won a Costume Designers Guild Award in the Excellence in Variety, Reality-Competition, Live Television category, and has received two Primetime Emmy Award for Outstanding Costumes for a Variety, Nonfiction, or Reality Programming nominations. Aside from double-length episodes, most run for about 43 minutes.

== Series overview ==
| Season | Episodes | Originally released | |
| Season | Episodes | First released | Last released |
|---|---|---|---|
| 1 | 10 | January 2, 2019 | February 27, 2019 |
| 2 | 13 | September 25, 2019 | December 18, 2019 |
| 3 | 17 | February 2, 2020 | May 20, 2020 |
| 4 | 12 | September 23, 2020 | December 16, 2020 |
| 5 | 11 | March 10, 2021 | May 26, 2021 |
| 6 | 13 | September 22, 2021 | December 15, 2021 |
| 7 | 11 | March 9, 2022 | May 18, 2022 |
| 8 | 12 | September 21, 2022 | November 30, 2022 |
| 9 | 14 | February 15, 2023 | May 17, 2023 |
| 10 | 11 | September 27, 2023 | December 20, 2023 |
| 11 | 13 | March 6, 2024 | May 22, 2024 |
| 12 | 12 | September 25, 2024 | December 18, 2024 |
| 13 | 13 | February 12, 2025 | May 7, 2025 |
| 14 | 12 | January 7, 2026 | April 1, 2026 |
| Specials | 12 | September 15, 2019 | December 12, 2023 |

== Episodes ==
=== Season 1 (2019) ===
List of season 1 episodes
| No. overall | No. in season | Title | Original release date | Prod. code | U.S. viewers (millions) | Rating/share (18–49) |
|---|---|---|---|---|---|---|
| 1 | 1 | "Season Premiere: Mask On Face Off" | January 2, 2019 | MS-101 | 9.37 | 3.0/12 |
| 2 | 2 | "New Masks on the Block" | January 9, 2019 | MS-102 | 7.08 | 2.3/10 |
| 3 | 3 | "Five Masks No More" | January 16, 2019 | MS-103 | 6.95 | 2.3/9 |
| 4 | 4 | "Another Mask Bites the Dust" | January 23, 2019 | MS-104 | 7.15 | 2.3/9 |
| 5 | 5 | "Mix and Masks" | January 30, 2019 | MS-105 | 7.88 | 2.6/11 |
| 6 | 6 | "Touchy Feely Clues" | February 6, 2019 | MS-106 | 7.14 | 2.2/9 |
| 7 | 7 | "All Together Now" | February 13, 2019 | MS-107 | 7.85 | 2.4/11 |
| 8 | 8 | "Semi Finals: Double Unmasking" | February 20, 2019 | MS-108 | 8.28 | 2.7/11 |
| 9 | 9 | "Road to the Finals" | February 27, 2019 | MS-109 | 8.59 | 2.6/12 |
| 10 | 10 | "Season Finale: The Final Mask is Lifted" | February 27, 2019 | MS-110 | 11.48 | 3.6/15 |

=== Season 2 (2019) ===
List of season 2 episodes
| No. overall | No. in season | Title | Original release date | Prod. code | U.S. viewers (millions) | Rating/share (18–49) |
|---|---|---|---|---|---|---|
| 11 | 1 | "Return of the Masks: Groups A & B" | September 25, 2019 | MS-201/2 | 8.03 | 2.5/12 |
| 12 | 2 | "Return of the Masks: Group C" | October 2, 2019 | MS-203 | 6.99 | 2.0/10 |
| 13 | 3 | "Return of the Masks: Group D" | October 9, 2019 | MS-204 | 7.12 | 2.0/10 |
| 14 | 4 | "Once Upon a Mask" | October 16, 2019 | MS-205 | 7.42 | 2.2/11 |
| 15 | 5 | "Mask Us Anything" | November 6, 2019 | MS-206 | 7.12 | 2.0/10 |
| 16 | 6 | "Mask-ish" | November 6, 2019 | MS-207 | 7.12 | 2.0/10 |
| 17 | 7 | "Triumph Over Masks" | November 13, 2019 | MS-208 | 5.59 | 1.7/8 |
| 18 | 8 | "Mask and You Shall Receive" | November 20, 2019 | MS-209 | 6.70 | 1.9/9 |
| 19 | 9 | "Clash of the Masks" | December 4, 2019 | MS-210 | 6.60 | 1.8/9 |
| 20 | 10 | "A Pain in the Mask" | December 10, 2019 | MS-211 | 5.79 | 1.6/9 |
| 21 | 11 | "Two Masks Take It Off: Holiday Semi-Finals" | December 11, 2019 | MS-212 | 6.91 | 1.9/10 |
| 22 | 12 | "Road to the Finals" | December 18, 2019 | MS-213 | 6.21 | 1.6/9 |
| 23 | 13 | "Season Finale: And The Winner Takes It All and Takes It Off" | December 18, 2019 | MS-214 | 8.37 | 2.2/11 |

=== Season 3 (2020) ===
List of season 3 episodes
| No. overall | No. in season | Title | Original release date | Prod. code | U.S. viewers (millions) | Rating/share (18–49) |
|---|---|---|---|---|---|---|
| 24 | 1 | "The Season Kick off Mask Off: Group A" | February 2, 2020 | MS-301 | 23.78 | 8.1/36 |
| 25 | 2 | "The Playoffs: Group A" | February 5, 2020 | MS-302 | 7.46 | 2.0/10 |
| 26 | 3 | "Masking for a Friend: Group A Championships" | February 12, 2020 | MS-303 | 6.64 | 1.8/10 |
| 27 | 4 | "A Brand New Six Pack: Group B Kickoff!" | February 19, 2020 | MS-304 | 7.13 | 2.0/10 |
| 28 | 5 | "Mask-Matics: Group B Playoffs" | February 26, 2020 | MS-305 | 6.75 | 1.8/9 |
| 29 | 6 | "Friends in High Places: Group B Championships" | March 4, 2020 | MS-306 | 6.82 | 1.8/10 |
| 30 | 7 | "Last But Not Least: Group C Kickoff!" | March 11, 2020 | MS-307 | 7.25 | 1.9/10 |
| 31 | 8 | "It Never Hurts to Mask: Group C Playoffs" | March 18, 2020 | MS-308 | 8.02 | 2.2/10 |
| 32 | 9 | "Old Friends, New Clues: Group C Championships" | March 25, 2020 | MS-309 | 8.03 | 2.2/10 |
| 33 | 10 | "The Super Nine Masked Singer Special: Groups A, B & C" | April 1, 2020 | MS-310/311 | 8.90 | 2.4/12 |
| 34 | 11 | "The Mother of All Final Face Offs, Part 1" | April 8, 2020 | MS-312 | 7.94 | 2.1/11 |
| 35 | 12 | "The Mother of All Final Face Offs, Part 2" | April 22, 2020 | MS-313 | 8.14 | 2.1/11 |
| 36 | 13 | "The Battle of The Sixes: The Final 6" | April 29, 2020 | MS-314 | 7.81 | 2.1/11 |
| 37 | 14 | "A Quarter Mask Crisis: The Quarter Finals" | May 6, 2020 | MS-315 | 7.29 | 1.8/10 |
| 38 | 15 | "A Day In the Mask: The Semi Finals" | May 13, 2020 | MS-316 | 7.24 | 1.9/10 |
| 39 | 16 | "The Masked Singer: Road to the Finals" | May 19, 2020 | MS-317 | 4.26 | 1.0/6 |
| 40 | 17 | "Couldn't Mask For Anything More: The Grand Finale!" | May 20, 2020 | MS-318 | 9.01 | 2.3/14 |

=== Season 4 (2020) ===
List of season 4 episodes
| No. overall | No. in season | Title | Original release date | Prod. code | U.S. viewers (millions) | Rating (18–49) |
|---|---|---|---|---|---|---|
| 41 | 1 | "The Season Premiere - The Masks Return" | September 23, 2020 | MS-401 | 5.92 | 1.6 |
| 42 | 2 | "The Group B Premiere - Six More Masks" | September 30, 2020 | MS-402 | 6.94 | 1.9 |
| 43 | 3 | "The Group A Play Offs - Famous Masked Words" | October 7, 2020 | MS-403 | 6.01 | 1.5 |
| 44 | 4 | "The Group B Play Offs - Cloudy with a Chance of Clues" | October 14, 2020 | MS-404 | 6.50 | 1.7 |
| 45 | 5 | "The Group C Premiere - Masked But Not Least" | October 28, 2020 | MS-405 | 6.20 | 1.6 |
| 46 | 6 | "The Group C Play Offs - Funny You Should Mask" | November 4, 2020 | MS-406 | 6.57 | 1.7 |
| 47 | 7 | "The Group A Finals - The Masked Frontier" | November 11, 2020 | MS-407 | 6.07 | 1.6 |
| 48 | 8 | "The Group B Finals - The Mask Chance Saloon" | November 18, 2020 | MS-408 | 6.42 | 1.7 |
| 49 | 9 | "The Group C Finals - The Masks Give Thanks" | November 26, 2020 | MS-409 | 11.42 | 3.5 |
| 50 | 10 | "The Semi Finals - The Super Six" | December 2, 2020 | MS-410/411 | 6.57 | 1.6 |
| 51 | 11 | "Road to the Finals" | December 16, 2020 | MS-413 | 5.44 | 1.3 |
| 52 | 12 | "The Season 4 Finale - Last Mask Standing" | December 16, 2020 | MS-414 | 7.41 | 1.8 |

=== Season 5 (2021) ===
List of season 5 episodes
| No. overall | No. in season | Title | Original release date | Prod. code | U.S. viewers (millions) | Rating/share (18–49) |
|---|---|---|---|---|---|---|
| 53 | 1 | "Season 5 Premiere - Return of the Masks" | March 10, 2021 | MS-501 | 5.66 | 1.3/9 |
| 54 | 2 | "Group B Premiere - Shamrock and Roll" | March 17, 2021 | MS-502 | 5.12 | 1.2/9 |
| 55 | 3 | "Group A Wildcard Round - Enter The Wildcards!" | March 24, 2021 | MS-503 | 5.20 | 1.2/8 |
| 56 | 4 | "Group B Wildcard Round - Rule of Claw!" | March 31, 2021 | MS-504 | 5.05 | 1.2/9 |
| 57 | 5 | "Group B Finals - The Ulti 'Mutt' Wildcard!" | April 7, 2021 | MS-505 | 4.79 | 1.1/8 |
| 58 | 6 | "Group A Finals - In the Nick of Time!" | April 14, 2021 | MS-506 | 5.17 | 1.2/8 |
| 59 | 7 | "Super 8 - The Plot Chickens!" | April 21, 2021 | MS-507/508 | 5.08 | 1.2/8 |
| 60 | 8 | "The Spicy 6 - The Competition Heats Up!" | May 5, 2021 | MS-510 | 4.71 | 1.1/8 |
| 61 | 9 | "The Quarter Finals - Five Fan Favorites" | May 12, 2021 | MS-511 | 4.77 | 1.1/8 |
| 62 | 10 | "Semifinals" | May 19, 2021 | MS-512 | 5.23 | 1.2/8 |
| 63 | 11 | "Finale" | May 26, 2021 | MS-513 | 5.51 | 1.4/9 |

=== Season 6 (2021) ===
List of season 6 episodes
| No. overall | No. in season | Title | Original release date | Prod. code | U.S. viewers (millions) | Rating/share (18–49) |
|---|---|---|---|---|---|---|
| 64 | 1 | "2 Night Season Premiere, Part 1: Group A Premiere" | September 22, 2021 | MS-601 | 4.74 | 1.1/8 |
| 65 | 2 | "2 Night Season Premiere, Part 2: Back to School" | September 23, 2021 | MS-602 | 4.65 | 1.0/7 |
| 66 | 3 | "Group B Premiere" | September 29, 2021 | MS-603 | 4.55 | 1.0/7 |
| 67 | 4 | "House Party" | October 6, 2021 | MS-604 | 4.35 | 0.9/6 |
| 68 | 5 | "Date Night" | October 13, 2021 | MS-605 | 4.60 | 1.0/7 |
| 69 | 6 | "Time Warp" | October 20, 2021 | MS-606 | 4.53 | 1.0/7 |
| 70 | 7 | "Giving Thanks" | November 3, 2021 | MS-608 | 4.20 | 0.9/7 |
| 71 | 8 | "Group A Semi-Final" | November 10, 2021 | MS-609 | 3.96 | 0.9/6 |
| 72 | 9 | "Group B Semi-Final" | November 17, 2021 | MS-610 | 4.64 | 1.0/8 |
| 73 | 10 | "Group A Finale" | December 1, 2021 | MS-611 | 4.17 | 0.9/6 |
| 74 | 11 | "Group B Finale" | December 8, 2021 | MS-612 | 4.32 | 0.9/6 |
| 75 | 12 | "2 Hour Grand Finale Part 1" | December 15, 2021 | MS-613 | 4.41 | 0.8/6 |
| 76 | 13 | "2 Hour Grand Finale Part 2" | December 15, 2021 | MS-614 | 5.08 | 1.0/7 |

=== Season 7 (2022) ===
List of season 7 episodes
| No. overall | No. in season | Title | Original release date | Prod. code | U.S. viewers (millions) | Rating/share (18–49) |
|---|---|---|---|---|---|---|
| 77 | 1 | "Masks Back - The Good, The Bad & The Cuddly - Round 1" | March 9, 2022 | MS-701 | 4.15 | 0.9/7 |
| 78 | 2 | "Masks at Dawn - Round 1" | March 16, 2022 | MS-702 | 4.03 | 0.7/6 |
| 79 | 3 | "The Double Unmasking - Round 1 Finals" | March 23, 2022 | MS-703 | 4.17 | 0.7/6 |
| 80 | 4 | "Masking For It - The Good, The Bad & The Cuddly - Round 2" | March 30, 2022 | MS-704 | 4.39 | 0.8/7 |
| 81 | 5 | "Masking for a Duel - Round 2" | April 6, 2022 | MS-705 | 3.97 | 0.7/6 |
| 82 | 6 | "The Double Mask Off - Round 2 Finals" | April 13, 2022 | MS-706 | 3.97 | 0.7/6 |
| 83 | 7 | "Don't Mask, Don't Tell - The Good, The Bad & The Cuddly - Round 3" | April 20, 2022 | MS-707 | 3.83 | 0.6/5 |
| 84 | 8 | "The Mask of Least Resistance - Round 3" | April 27, 2022 | MS-708 | 4.17 | 0.7/6 |
| 85 | 9 | "One Mask Hurrah - Round 3 Finals" | May 4, 2022 | MS-709 | 4.06 | 0.7/6 |
| 86 | 10 | "Road to the Finals" | May 11, 2022 | MS-710 | 3.00 | 0.5/4 |
| 87 | 11 | "Season Finale: I'm Team Good, Thanks for Masking" | May 18, 2022 | MS-711 | 4.19 | 0.7/6 |

=== Season 8 (2022) ===
List of season 8 episodes
| No. overall | No. in season | Title | Original release date | Prod. code | U.S. viewers (millions) | Rating/share (18–49) |
|---|---|---|---|---|---|---|
| 88 | 1 | "A Royal Season Premiere" | September 21, 2022 | MS-801 | 3.70 | 0.6/6 |
| 89 | 2 | "Vegas Night" | September 28, 2022 | MS-802 | 3.89 | 0.7/6 |
| 90 | 3 | "TV Theme Night" | October 5, 2022 | MS-803 | 4.17 | 0.7/6 |
| 91 | 4 | "Andrew Lloyd Webber Night" | October 19, 2022 | MS-804 | 2.52 | 0.4/3 |
| 92 | 5 | "Muppets Night" | October 26, 2022 | MS-805 | 4.20 | 0.7/6 |
| 93 | 6 | "90s Night" | November 6, 2022 | MS-806 | 2.78 | 0.5/4 |
| 94 | 7 | "Hall of Fame Night" | November 9, 2022 | MS-807 | 3.16 | 0.6/5 |
| 95 | 8 | "Comedy Roast Night" | November 16, 2022 | MS-808 | 3.71 | 0.6/5 |
| 96 | 9 | "Fright Night" | November 23, 2022 | MS-809 | 3.67 | 0.6/6 |
| 97 | 10 | "Battle of the Semi Finals" | November 24, 2022 | MS-810 | 7.86 | 2.2/15 |
| 98 | 11 | "Two Hour Epic Finale Pt. 1" | November 30, 2022 | MS-811 | 3.52 | 0.6/5 |
| 99 | 12 | "Two Hour Epic Finale Pt. 2" | November 30, 2022 | MS-812 | 4.18 | 0.7/6 |

=== Season 9 (2023) ===
List of season 9 episodes
| No. overall | No. in season | Title | Original release date | Prod. code | U.S. viewers (millions) | Rating/share (18–49) |
|---|---|---|---|---|---|---|
| 100 | 1 | "Season 9 Premiere" | February 15, 2023 | MS-901 | 3.71 | 0.6/6 |
| 101 | 2 | "ABBA Night" | February 22, 2023 | MS-902 | 3.83 | 0.6/6 |
| 102 | 3 | "New York Night" | March 1, 2023 | MS-903 | 3.68 | 0.6/5 |
| 103 | 4 | "DC Superheroes Night" | March 8, 2023 | MS-904 | 4.02 | 0.7/6 |
| 104 | 5 | "Sesame Street Night" | March 15, 2023 | MS-905 | 4.01 | 0.7/6 |
| 105 | 6 | "Country Night" | March 22, 2023 | MS-906 | 3.68 | 0.5/5 |
| 106 | 7 | "'80s Night" | March 29, 2023 | MS-907 | 3.91 | 0.7/6 |
| 107 | 8 | "WB Movie Night" | April 5, 2023 | MS-908 | 3.69 | 0.6/6 |
| 108 | 9 | "Masked Singer in Space" | April 12, 2023 | MS-909 | 3.78 | 0.5/5 |
| 109 | 10 | "Supreme Six" | April 19, 2023 | MS-910 | 3.45 | 0.5/5 |
| 110 | 11 | "Battle of the Saved" | April 26, 2023 | MS-911 | 3.40 | 0.5/5 |
| 111 | 12 | "Quarter Finals" | May 3, 2023 | MS-912 | 3.41 | 0.5/5 |
| 112 | 13 | "Semi-Finals" | May 10, 2023 | MS-913 | 3.54 | 0.5/5 |
| 113 | 14 | "Finale" | May 17, 2023 | MS-914 | 3.73 | 0.6/5 |

=== Season 10 (2023) ===
List of season 10 episodes
| No. overall | No. in season | Title | Original release date | Prod. code | U.S. viewers (millions) | Rating/share (18–49) |
|---|---|---|---|---|---|---|
| 114 | 1 | "Season 10 Premiere" | September 27, 2023 | MS-1002 | 3.22 | 0.5/6 |
| 115 | 2 | "NFL Night" | October 4, 2023 | MS-1003 | 3.51 | 0.5/6 |
| 116 | 3 | "2000s Night" | October 11, 2023 | MS-1004 | 3.25 | 0.4/4 |
| 117 | 4 | "A Celebration of Elton John" | October 18, 2023 | MS-1005 | 3.56 | 0.5/5 |
| 118 | 5 | "Harry Potter Night" | October 25, 2023 | MS-1006 | 3.54 | 0.5/5 |
| 119 | 6 | "One Hit Wonders Night" | November 8, 2023 | MS-1007 | 3.15 | 0.4/4 |
| 120 | 7 | "Trolls Night" | November 15, 2023 | MS-1008 | 3.31 | 0.4/5 |
| 121 | 8 | "Disco Night" | November 29, 2023 | MS-1009 | 3.02 | 0.4/4 |
| 122 | 9 | "I Wanna Rock" | December 6, 2023 | MS-1010 | 3.20 | 0.4/4 |
| 123 | 10 | "Soundtrack to My Life" | December 13, 2023 | MS-1013 | 2.98 | 0.4/4 |
| 124 | 11 | "Season 10 Finale" | December 20, 2023 | MS-1014/1015 | 3.76 | 0.5/6 |

=== Season 11 (2024) ===
List of season 11 episodes
| No. overall | No. in season | Title | Original release date | Prod. code | U.S. viewers (millions) | Rating/share (18–49) |
|---|---|---|---|---|---|---|
| 125 | 1 | "Season 11 Premiere: Rita We Love Your Ora" | March 6, 2024 | MS-1101 | 3.29 | 0.4/5 |
| 126 | 2 | "Group B Premiere: The Wizard of Oz Night" | March 13, 2024 | MS-1102 | 3.44 | 0.4/5 |
| 127 | 3 | "Group C Premiere: Billy Joel Night" | March 20, 2024 | MS-1103 | 3.19 | 0.4/5 |
| 128 | 4 | "TV Theme Night" | March 27, 2024 | MS-1104 | 3.24 | 0.4/5 |
| 129 | 5 | "Group C Finals: Shower Anthems Night" | April 3, 2024 | MS-1105 | 3.36 | 0.4/5 |
| 130 | 6 | "Transformers Night" | April 10, 2024 | MS-1106 | 3.43 | 0.5/6 |
| 131 | 7 | "Group A Finals: Queen Night" | April 17, 2024 | MS-1107 | 3.44 | 0.4/5 |
| 132 | 8 | "Girl Group Night" | April 24, 2024 | MS-1108 | 3.41 | 0.4/5 |
| 133 | 9 | "Group B Finals: Soundtrack Of My Life" | May 1, 2024 | MS-1109 | 2.95 | 0.4/5 |
| 134 | 10 | "Quarter Finals: Final Four" | May 8, 2024 | MS-1110 | 3.01 | 0.4/4 |
| 135 | 11 | "Road to the Semi Finals" | May 15, 2024 | MS-1111 | 2.77 | 0.4/4 |
| 136 | 12 | "Semi Finals: Then There Were Three" | May 15, 2024 | MS-1112 | 2.91 | 0.4/4 |
| 137 | 13 | "Finale: One Mask Takes It All" | May 22, 2024 | MS-1113 | 2.99 | 0.4/4 |

=== Season 12 (2024) ===
List of season 12 episodes
| No. overall | No. in season | Title | Original release date | Prod. code | U.S. viewers (millions) | Rating/share (18–49) |
|---|---|---|---|---|---|---|
| 138 | 1 | "Season 12 Premiere: Who Can It Be Now?" | September 25, 2024 | MS-1201 | 2.90 | 0.5/6 |
| 139 | 2 | "Footloose Night" | October 2, 2024 | MS-1202 | 2.86 | 0.4/5 |
| 140 | 3 | "Group A Finals: Soundtrack of My Life" | October 9, 2024 | MS-1203 | 2.60 | 0.4/4 |
| 141 | 4 | "Group B Premiere: Sports Night" | October 16, 2024 | MS-1204 | 2.81 | 0.4/5 |
| 142 | 5 | "Barbie Night" | October 23, 2024 | MS-1205 | 2.77 | 0.3/4 |
| 143 | 6 | "Group B Finals: '60s Night" | November 6, 2024 | MS-1206 | 2.91 | 0.4/5 |
| 144 | 7 | "Group C Premiere: Who Are You Fest" | November 13, 2024 | MS-1207 | 2.98 | 0.4/5 |
| 145 | 8 | "Miley Cyrus Night" | November 20, 2024 | MS-1208 | 2.69 | 0.3/4 |
| 146 | 9 | "Group C Finals: A Peanuts Thanksgiving" | November 28, 2024 | MS-1209 | 5.16 | 1.2/11 |
| 147 | 10 | "Quarter Finals: Merging of the Masks" | December 4, 2024 | MS-1210 | 2.76 | 0.3/5 |
| 148 | 11 | "Semi-Finals: The Final Three" | December 11, 2024 | MS-1211 | 3.12 | 0.4/5 |
| 149 | 12 | "Finale: A Champion Is Crowned" | December 18, 2024 | MS-1212 | 3.16 | 0.4/5 |

=== Season 13 (2025) ===
List of season 13 episodes
| No. overall | No. in season | Title | Original release date | Prod. code | U.S. viewers (millions) | Rating/share (18–49) |
|---|---|---|---|---|---|---|
| 150 | 1 | "Lucky Season 13: Group A Premiere" | February 12, 2025 | MS-1301 | 3.06 | 0.4/5 |
| 151 | 2 | "Shrek Night" | February 19, 2025 | MS-1302 | 3.02 | 0.4/6 |
| 152 | 3 | "Group A Finals: A Rat Pack Tribute Night" | February 26, 2025 | MS-1303 | 2.93 | 0.4/5 |
| 153 | 4 | "Group B Premiere: Voices of Olympus" | March 5, 2025 | MS-1304 | 2.61 | 0.3/5 |
| 154 | 5 | "Ghostbusters Night" | March 12, 2025 | MS-1305 | 2.90 | 0.4/5 |
| 155 | 6 | "Group B Finals" | March 19, 2025 | MS-1306 | 2.61 | 0.4/5 |
| 156 | 7 | "Group C Premiere: Carnival Night" | March 26, 2025 | MS-1307 | 2.67 | 0.3/5 |
| 157 | 8 | "Boy Band Night" | April 2, 2025 | MS-1308 | 2.85 | 0.3/4 |
| 158 | 9 | "Group C Finals: Decades Night" | April 9, 2025 | MS-1309 | 3.02 | 0.3/4 |
| 159 | 10 | "The Lucky 6: Merging of the Masks" | April 16, 2025 | MS-1310 | 2.84 | 0.4/6 |
| 160 | 11 | "Quarter Finals: Soundtrack Of My Life Night" | April 23, 2025 | MS-1311 | 2.79 | 0.4/5 |
| 161 | 12 | "The Semi-Finals: Head-To-Head Battles" | April 30, 2025 | MS-1312 | 2.75 | 0.3/4 |
| 162 | 13 | "The Two-Hour Lucky Season 13 Finale" | May 7, 2025 | MS-1313 | 2.89 | 0.4/5 |

=== Season 14 (2026) ===
List of season 14 episodes
| No. overall | No. in season | Title | Original release date | Prod. code |
|---|---|---|---|---|
| 163 | 1 | "Premiere" | January 7, 2026 | MS-1401/1402 |
| 164 | 2 | "Fear Night" | January 14, 2026 | MS-1403 |
| 165 | 3 | "Clueless Night" | January 21, 2026 | MS-1404 |
| 166 | 4 | "Teenage Mutant Ninja Turtles Night" | January 28, 2026 | MS-1405 |
| 167 | 5 | "Red, White and Clue Celebration of America's 250th Birthday" | February 4, 2026 | MS-1406 |
| 168 | 6 | "Twilight Night" | February 11, 2026 | MS-1407 |
| 169 | 7 | "Spice Girls Night" | February 25, 2026 | MS-1408 |
| 170 | 8 | "Ozzfest Night" | March 4, 2026 | MS-1409 |
| 171 | 9 | "Care Bears Night" | March 11, 2026 | MS-1410 |
| 172 | 10 | "Star Trek Night" | March 18, 2026 | MS-1411 |
| 173 | 11 | "Semi-Finals" | March 25, 2026 | MS-1412 |
| 174 | 12 | "Finale" | April 1, 2026 | MS-1413/1414 |

== Specials ==
List of special episodes
| No. | Title | Original release date | Prod. code | U.S. viewers (millions) | Rating/share (18–49) |
|---|---|---|---|---|---|
| 1 | "Super Sneak Peek" | September 15, 2019 | SP-2004 | 4.53 | 1.4/6 |
| 2 | "The Masked Singer: Sing-Along Spectacular" | April 15, 2020 | MS-300 | 6.87 | 1.8/9 |
| 3 | "Special Season Four Sneak Peek" | September 13, 2020 | MS-400 | 5.57 | 1.6/9 |
| 4 | "The Holiday Sing-a-Long" | December 9, 2020 | MS-412 | 4.89 | 1.1/7 |
| 5 | "The Sing-A-Long: The Maskie Awards" | April 28, 2021 | MS-509 | 3.62 | 0.8/6 |
| 6 | "The Masked Singer & Alter Ego Sneak Peek" | September 12, 2021 | SP-2203 | 2.94 | 0.9/6 |
| 7 | "All-Time Countdown" | October 25, 2021 | MS-607 | 2.28 | 0.4/3 |
| 8 | "The Masked Singer Christmas Singalong" | December 22, 2021 | MS-615/616 | 2.07 | 0.3/2 |
| 9 | "The Masked Singer Sneak Peek" | February 20, 2022 | SP-2216 | 2.26 | 0.5/5 |
| 10 | "Masked Singer Seasonal Sing-A-Long Spectacular!" | December 7, 2022 | MS-813 | 2.04 | 0.3/3 |
| 11 | "Season 10 Kickoff" | September 10, 2023 | MS-1001 | 3.98 | 0.9/7 |
| 12 | "Holiday Sing-along" | December 12, 2023 | MS-1011/1012 | 1.83 | 0.3/3 |

== The Masked Singer: After the Mask ==
List of The Masked Singer: After the Mask episodes
| No. | Title | Original release date | Prod. code | U.S. viewers (millions) | Rating/share (18–49) |
|---|---|---|---|---|---|
| 1 | "After the Mask: The Mother of All Final Face Offs, Part 2" | April 22, 2020 | MS-313A | 5.38 | 1.4/7 |
| 2 | "After the Mask: The Battle of The Sixes: The Final 6" | April 29, 2020 | MS-314A | 4.35 | 1.1/6 |
| 3 | "After the Mask: A Quarter Mask Crisis: The Quarter Finals" | May 6, 2020 | MS-315A | 3.79 | 0.9/5 |
| 4 | "After the Mask: A Day In the Mask: The Semi Finals" | May 13, 2020 | MS-316A | 3.58 | 0.8/4 |

== Viewership and ratings ==
In both 2019 and 2020, the show was named the "Hottest Reality/Competition Series" in the United States by Adweek. Excluding post-NFL game debuts, the program's premiere was the highest-rated for an unscripted television series in the country since The X Factor in 2011. Ratings grew toward the end of the first season, and The Masked Singer concluded the 2018–2019 American television season as the highest-rated new series in the key demographic of adults 18–49 and the first unscripted series to rank number one in the genre in its first season since Joe Millionaire in 2003. TV Guide named it the television season's "most underestimated show". During the following television season, the series was one of two non-NFL programs to charge over $200,000 per 30 seconds of advertising. Deadline Hollywood cited the second season as a major reason Fox—for the first time in the network's history—ranked number one in fall entertainment programming.

The premiere of the third season following Super Bowl LIV became the series' most-watched episode. Throughout the season's latter half which aired amid the COVID-19 pandemic in the United States, episodes experienced a rise in viewership compared to those broadcast before the outbreak. Although the 18–49 rating was lower than the first's, the show remained the top non-sports program in the demographic. During the 2020–2021 United States television season, ad prices for the show increased 12 percent to about $226,000 per 30 seconds. While the highest-rated entertainment broadcast since the third season's finale, the first episode of the fourth season tied for the series' lowest at the time. A broadcast following a Thanksgiving NFL game was the most-watched and highest-rated of the series excluding the post-Super Bowl episode since the first season's finale. With the fourth and fifth season's ratings, The Masked Singer remained the highest-rated entertainment program among adults 18–49 for the third consecutive television season.

=== Seasons 1-8 ===
The Masked Singer : U.S. viewers per episode (millions)

| Season | Episode number | | | | | | | | | | | | | | | | | Average |
| Season | 1 | 2 | 3 | 4 | 5 | 6 | 7 | 8 | 9 | 10 | 11 | 12 | 13 | 14 | 15 | 16 | 17 | Average |
|---|---|---|---|---|---|---|---|---|---|---|---|---|---|---|---|---|---|---|
| 1 | 9.37 | 7.08 | 6.95 | 7.15 | 7.88 | 7.14 | 7.85 | 8.28 | 8.59 | 11.48 | – | | | | | | | 8.18 |
| 2 | 8.03 | 6.99 | 7.12 | 7.42 | 7.12 | 7.12 | 5.59 | 6.70 | 6.60 | 5.79 | 6.91 | 6.21 | 8.37 | – | | | | 6.92 |
| 3 | 23.78 | 7.46 | 6.64 | 7.13 | 6.75 | 6.82 | 7.25 | 8.02 | 8.03 | 8.90 | 7.94 | 8.14 | 7.81 | 7.29 | 7.24 | 4.26 | 9.01 | 8.38 |
| 4 | 5.92 | 6.94 | 6.01 | 6.50 | 6.20 | 6.57 | 6.07 | 6.42 | 11.42 | 6.57 | 5.44 | 7.41 | – | | | | | 6.79 |
| 5 | 5.66 | 5.12 | 5.20 | 5.05 | 4.79 | 5.17 | 5.08 | 4.71 | 4.77 | 5.23 | 5.51 | – | | | | | | 5.12 |
| 6 | 4.74 | 4.65 | 4.55 | 4.35 | 4.60 | 4.53 | 4.20 | 3.96 | 4.64 | 4.17 | 4.36 | 4.41 | 5.08 | – | | | | 4.48 |
| 7 | 4.15 | 4.03 | 4.17 | 4.39 | 3.97 | 3.97 | 3.83 | 4.17 | 4.06 | 3.00 | 4.19 | – | | | | | | 3.99 |
| 8 | 3.70 | 3.89 | 4.17 | 2.52 | 4.20 | 2.78 | 3.16 | 3.71 | 3.67 | 7.86 | 3.52 | 4.18 | – | | | | | 3.95 |

Audience measurement performed by Nielsen Media Research (Note: The viewership statistics in the graph and table are sourced from the citations in the season-specific tables above.)

=== Seasons 9-14 ===
Viewers per episode (millions)

| Season | Episode number | | | | | | | | | | | | | | Average |
| Season | 1 | 2 | 3 | 4 | 5 | 6 | 7 | 8 | 9 | 10 | 11 | 12 | 13 | 14 | Average |
|---|---|---|---|---|---|---|---|---|---|---|---|---|---|---|---|
| 9 | 3.71 | 3.83 | 3.68 | 4.02 | 4.01 | 3.68 | 3.91 | 3.69 | 3.78 | 3.45 | 3.40 | 3.41 | 3.54 | 3.73 | 3.70 |
| 10 | 3.22 | 3.51 | 3.25 | 3.56 | 3.54 | 3.15 | 3.31 | 3.02 | 3.20 | 2.98 | 3.76 | – | | | 3.32 |
| 11 | 3.29 | 3.44 | 3.19 | 3.24 | 3.36 | 3.43 | 3.44 | 3.41 | 2.95 | 3.01 | 2.77 | 2.91 | 2.99 | – | 3.19 |
| 12 | 2.90 | 2.86 | 2.60 | 2.81 | 2.77 | 2.91 | 2.98 | 2.69 | 5.16 | 2.76 | 3.12 | 3.16 | – | | 3.06 |
| 13 | 3.06 | 3.02 | 2.93 | 2.61 | 2.90 | 2.61 | 2.67 | 2.85 | 3.02 | 2.84 | 2.79 | 2.75 | 2.89 | – | 2.84 |
| 14 | TBD | TBD | TBD | TBD | TBD | TBD | TBD | – | | | | | | | TBD |

Source: (Note: The viewership statistics in the graph and table are sourced from the citations in the season-specific tables above.)

=== Specials ===
Viewers per episode (millions)

| Season | Episode number | | | | | | | | | | | | Average |
| Season | 1 | 2 | 3 | 4 | 5 | 6 | 7 | 8 | 9 | 10 | 11 | 12 | Average |
|---|---|---|---|---|---|---|---|---|---|---|---|---|---|
| Specials | 4.53 | 6.87 | 5.57 | 4.89 | 3.62 | 2.94 | 2.28 | 2.07 | 2.26 | 2.04 | 3.98 | 1.83 | N/A |

Source: (Note: The viewership statistics in the graph and table are sourced from the citations in the season-specific tables above.)

== Glossary ==
Rating
The percentage of a group (e.g., households, persons age 18–49) in the United States with a television watching a program during any given minute of its broadcast, as measured by Nielsen Media Research.
Share
The percentage of a group (e.g., households, persons age 18–49) in the United States with a television in use watching a program during any given minute of its broadcast, as measured by Nielsen Media Research.
