= The Masked Singer (American TV series) =

American reality singing competition television series

- Genre: Reality competition
- Based on: King of Mask Singer by Munhwa Broadcasting Corporation
- Developed by: Craig Plestis
- Showrunners: Izzie Pick Ibarra; James Breen
- Directed by: Alex Rudzinski; Brad Duns
- Presented by: Nick Cannon
- Starring: Ken Jeong; Jenny McCarthy Wahlberg; Nicole Scherzinger; Robin Thicke; Rita Ora
- Opening theme: "Who Are You" by The Who
- Country of origin: United States
- Original language: English
- No. of seasons: 14
- No. of episodes: 186 (list of episodes)

Production
- Executive producers: Craig Plestis; Izzie Pick Ibarra; Rosie Seitchik; Nick Cannon; James Breen
- Running time: 41–85 minutes
- Production companies: Smart Dog Media; MBC Entertainment; Endemol Shine North America (season 1); Fox Entertainment Studios (seasons 2–14) (Note: Credited as Fox Alternative Entertainment for seasons 2–13); Eureka Productions (season 15)

Original release
- Network: Fox
- Release: January 2, 2019 – present

Related
- The Masked Singer: After the Mask; The Masked Dancer

The Masked Singer (abbreviated as TMS) is an American reality singing competition television series that premiered on Fox on January 2, 2019. It is part of the Masked Singer franchise that originated from the South Korean version of the show King of Mask Singer, which features celebrities singing songs while wearing head-to-toe costumes and face masks concealing their identities. Hosted by Nick Cannon, the program employs panelists who guess the celebrities' identities by interpreting clues provided to them throughout each season. Ken Jeong, Jenny McCarthy Wahlberg, Rita Ora, Robin Thicke, and previously Nicole Scherzinger appear in each episode and vote alongside an audience for their favorite singer after all performances have concluded. The first least popular is eliminated, taking off their mask to reveal their identity.

To prevent their identities from being revealed before each pre-recorded episode is broadcast, the program makes extensive use of code names, disguises, non-disclosure agreements, and a team of security guards. While television critics have had mixed reviews for the series and particularly negative opinions of its panelists, the costumes have attracted praise. Inspired by haute couture, they were designed in the first six seasons by Marina Toybina, who won a Costume Designers Guild Award and two Creative Arts Emmy Awards. Other production staff won or received nominations for various labor union awards, and the show has won or been nominated for awards presented by the Academy of Television Arts & Sciences, Critics Choice Association, and Hollywood Critics Association.

The first five seasons received the highest Nielsen ratings for a non-sports program in the key demographic of adults 18–49. Two spin-offs—an aftershow and a dance version, The Masked Dancer—followed as a result. The growth of the Masked Singer franchise has been credited to the show's success, as has an interest in adapting similar South Korean reality television series and other television formats centered on costumes. Media and merchandise associated with the series includes a podcast, clothing, accessories, NFTs, and a stage show.

The show's fourteenth season aired January–April 2026. In May 2026, the show was renewed for a fifteenth season.

== Format ==
Each season of The Masked Singer features a group of celebrity contestants. In a typical episode, four to six contestants anonymously in costume each sing a 90-second cover for panelists and an audience. Hints to their identities—known as the "clue package"—are given before and occasionally after each performs. The perennial format is a taped interview with a celebrity's electronically masked voice narrating a video showing cryptic allusions to what they are known for. During screenings of the clue packages, after performances, and before an elimination, the panelists are given time to speculate on each singer's identity out loud and write comments in note binders. They may ask questions and the host may offer additional clues. After performances conclude, the audience and panelists vote for their favorite singer using an electronic device. The show uses a weighted voting system; panelists' and audience members' votes are worth 50 percent each and combined to form a score. The least popular contestant then takes off their mask to reveal their identity. This process of elimination continues for a set number of episodes until three contestants remain in the season finale, and one is declared the winner after they perform again. The "Golden Mask" trophy is awarded as a prize.

Voting does not occur for certain performances; contestants in an episode might occasionally sing as a group, and each episode concludes with the eliminated celebrity singing an encore unmasked. Occasionally, the eliminated celebrity sings their signature song unmasked. To continue attracting viewers, producers often modify the format each season. Except in the first, fifth and sixth seasons, a "smackdown" round is featured in select episodes in which the two least popular competitors from their first performances sing one after another on the same stage, and a second, eliminating vote occurs. Since the second season, the contestants are initially divided and only compete in a designated subgroup. A "Golden Ear" trophy awarded to the panelist with the most correct first impression guesses at the end of a season was introduced for the fourth, and until the sixth, as was a reduction of performances and the audience viewing and voting remotely. These elements continued in the fifth seasons, and "wildcard" contestants who perform at the end of certain episodes competed for the first time.

=== Panelists and host ===
The permanent panel consists of actor and comedian Ken Jeong, television personality Jenny McCarthy Wahlberg, recording artist Nicole Scherzinger until season 10, and singer-songwriter Robin Thicke. A guest occasionally appears as a fifth panelist during an episode; Joel McHale has served as a guest panelist in almost every season, and previous seasons' winners have appeared. Nick Cannon hosts the show; his role was considered unclear in July 2020 after making anti-Semitic statements Fox said "inadvertently promoted hate". The network accepted Cannon's apology, and he pledged to donate his first paycheck from the fourth season to the Simon Wiesenthal Center after visiting with its officials. Niecy Nash acted as guest host for the first five episodes of the fifth season after Cannon tested positive for COVID-19. Recording artist Rita Ora, a panelist on the British version of the show, has substituted for Scherzinger since the eleventh season while Scherzinger appeared in the West End and Broadway revivals of Sunset Boulevard.

== Production ==
=== Conception and development ===
I turned around and all the diners were watching the TV screen. I saw a kangaroo in black pleather singing a pop song. At that moment I said, "Oh my gosh, I love this!" It was bizarre ... and it was still working. I found out that it was a hit format in Korea, it was a hit show in Thailand. And no one had the [U.S.] rights.

— Plestis on the creation of The Masked Singer.

The Masked Singer is based on the 2015 South Korean television series King of Mask Singer, which is the originator of the Masked Singer franchise. Executive producer Craig Plestis noticed the format in October 2017 at a Thai restaurant in Los Angeles. While waiting for dinner, he observed the other patrons staring at a television playing an episode of the Thai version of the show. Intrigued, Plestis researched the series online and contacted an executive of MBC America, a subsidiary of the producer and broadcaster of the South Korean program, Munhwa Broadcasting Corporation (MBC). With the help of his agent, Steve Wohl of Paradigm Talent Agency, Plestis secured the rights to produce an American adaptation from the company. Following the creation of a showreel, he pitched the series to several outlets, all of whom rejected the idea. Plestis then met with Fox executive Rob Wade who said he "responded ... right away" to the concept and considered its uniqueness among celebrity singing competitions a strength. After successfully pitching the program under the condition A-list celebrities participate, Plestis began developing it in November.

In January 2018, executive producer and showrunner Izzie Pick Ibarra became involved to help cast celebrities and Americanize the format. While The Masked Singer retains elements of the South Korean version, the structure and style are different. Rather than follow a tournament process in which singers perform against each other in multiple rounds, with the winner of the final round facing the previous episode's champion in an attempt to become the new "Mask King", Pick Ibarra opted to produce one elimination per episode, emphasize the clue package and guessing components, and have the celebrities wear more extravagant costumes. Plestis agreed, wanting to create a story arc throughout the episodes and—unlike the South Korean show—reuse the costumes. During performances, the production value is emphasized rather than panelists guessing which celebrity is singing.

On August 2, 2018, Fox ordered the series and released a trailer. Endemol Shine North America produced the first season due to Plestis' relationship with the studio. Following it, production transitioned to a new in-house studio, Fox Alternative Entertainment, which is more financially favorable for the network. Since the second and third seasons, respectively, Rosie Seitchik and Cannon have served as executive producers alongside Plestis. Pick Ibarra exited the series following the third and James Breen assumed her roles in subsequent seasons. Numerous production and format changes were implemented due to the COVID-19 pandemic, and testing and safety requirements increased the show's budget.

In May 2026, it was reported that Fox would be subcontracting production to Fremantle-owned Eureka Productions beginning with season 15. It was also reported that Eureka intended to relocate production from Los Angeles to New Jersey to take advantage of local tax credits for television production, and also enhance its ability to book New York City-based talent to appear on the show. It was later revealed that filming would relocate to the Meadowlands Arena in East Rutherford, New Jersey.

=== Casting ===
Since signing a deal with him in 2018, Fox offered Cannon multiple opportunities to host or produce other television programs, though none interested him. After being fascinated by the Masked Singer concept when presented with it, Cannon joined the show, believing it was "either going to be a huge failure or a huge hit". Pick Ibarra cited him as her number one choice for the role because of his personality and experience. Regarding the panelists, she said the production team was less concerned with selecting those with an ability to critique participants' singing abilities than creating a comedic tone for the series as one of their goals was to reassure celebrities they would not be ridiculed for appearing. Jeong was the first panelist to be signed on due to his humour and pre-existing knowledge of the South Korean version, followed by McCarthy Wahlberg and Thicke because of their enthusiasm regarding the concept, and Scherzinger for her positivity and experience as a singer. According to Plestis, he "only wanted [to cast] people who loved the program, not people who wanted to work on [it]". Unsure whether it would last more than one season, Jeong originally considered The Masked Singer a temporary job while he looked for a permanent role following the cancellation of his sitcom Dr. Ken. Thicke later questioned whether he would have taken the role "if [he had] still been No. 1 on the radio" and Scherzinger said she signed on to the show the day before filming began. In March 2019, Sharon Osbourne stated she was supposed to be signed on as a panelist, claiming those plans fell through when she was being contractually obligated to appear as a judge on The X Factor.

The show's producers reach out to celebrities via agents or vice versa. Wade said producers' goal is to cast celebrities of varying ages, genders, and backgrounds to appeal to as broad an audience as possible. In addition to "super big names", they prefer lesser-known celebrities because it is harder to guess them. To surprise viewers with an unknown talent when unmasked, those who are not professional singers are desired, though some must send producers recordings of them singing as a quasi-audition. All are given questionnaires before competing and asked if they have claustrophobia. Due to her strategy of sending potential participants sketches of costumes that might be featured, Pick Ibarra said casting for the first season "was not nearly as hard as [she] anticipated", though several celebrities were reluctant to compete. Following its success, an increased number were interested in participating in the second. By the third, Plestis said casting became "a lot easier".

=== Security ===
Before each participant is unmasked, the show's staff undertake significant security precautions to prevent the release of their identities. According to Plestis, the series has two bibles: one related to the format and a second, larger one for security measures. Everyone involved signs a non-disclosure agreement which prevents them from releasing information about the show until its broadcast. After a celebrity is confirmed to appear, they are allowed to inform a few others who also sign one. Outside of those, approximately 25 people know the contestants' real names during a season, though they never refer to them as such. Most are from Fox and the show's legal department; Cannon, the director, and the majority of the program's 150-person crew do not know who the celebrities are until they are unmasked. To prevent identities from being revealed in the event of a leak or hack, all documents except the contract only list participants' costume names. Although the contracts do give their real names, the series' name is unlisted. If a leak occurs, the network does not recognize it.

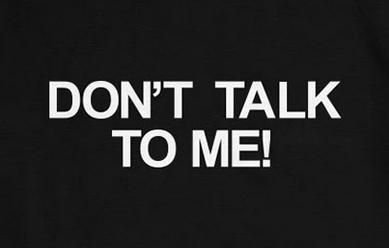
The front of hoodies celebrities wear while off camera

Before arriving on the show's set, celebrities and their family, friends, and agents are disguised and typically driven from a neutral location. If driven from their houses, chauffeurs are instructed to "take long, circuitous routes ... to throw off any would-be tails". The manager of Joey Fatone, "Rabbit" in the first season, said he was picked up at a 7-Eleven near Television City, given a disguise, and driven inside the gate. "Flamingo" in the second season, Adrienne Bailon-Houghton, stated she was taken to the set inside of an unmarked black car and only discussed her involvement on the show with producers in a "secret warehouse". When contestants arrive on the studio lot, personnel at the gate are not given their names. Each participant is escorted to and from their trailers outside of the set by security guards while disguised with a mask, visor, gloves, pants, and a hoodie to prevent their skin from showing. According to Scherzinger, they also escort panelists directly to their dressing rooms after arriving.

Due to the show's security, celebrities said they never encountered another masked participant on set, or if they did, could not speak to them. They are only allowed to communicate with those who wear a special cloth on the back of their clothing which is changed each season to prevent replication or those who wear a shirt with the words "Talk to Me". To do so, they use a portable voice changer or write on a whiteboard. Before performing, they are trained to use different body language and mannerisms than their own. The production crew is discouraged from using their phones during filming and the studio audience walks through a metal detector and has their phones placed in a Yondr magnetic pouch before entering the set. The panelists also forfeit their phones during tapings, and their note binders are placed "in a vault" after each to keep them private.

=== Design ===
==== Costumes ====
L–R: "Fox", "Butterfly", "Monster", "Kitty", and "Robot". "Robot" competed in an episode that won Toybina a Creative Arts Emmy Award.

The series' costumes are designed by Marina Toybina. In addition to her ideas, she considers celebrities' and producers' requests to formulate initial concepts. Each is designed to be dissimilar from those featured in previous seasons and other versions of the Masked Singer franchise by using different sewing and fabrication techniques. After researching "fur and skin textures, historical wardrobe, [and] anything that might be relevant to each character", Toybina sketches each concept with a pencil and works with an illustrator to create a digital version with a 3D effect. Producers review each design and note adjustments to be made. As a result, Toybina may sketch multiple versions before they collectively decide which will be featured during a season. Based on their background and what might suit them well, participants are presented with several to select from. Their reason for choosing a costume can differ; some have an emotional connection while others want to move around freely during performances.

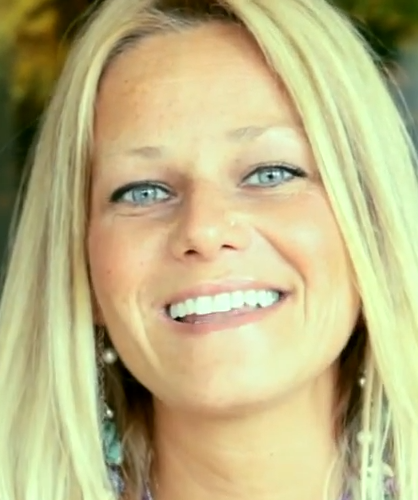
Marina Toybina designed the costumes in the first six seasons

After handpicking which fabrics and materials to use based on celebrities' mobility and performing abilities, Toybina collaborates with manufacturers and a team of about 15 people to custom-make each costume. They are created concurrently over two to three months, taking about two to four weeks per mask, and two to four weeks per costume. Beginning as a wire, foam is gradually added around each mask to create an easy-to-wear helmet shape for the performers and a chinstrap often accompanies each to prevent movement. As production time is limited, the team has no opportunity to experiment with different materials—"all garments are ... cut right away on the original fabric". Since "the draping and the handwork [are] all done the old school way", she cited couturiers such as Alexander McQueen, Thierry Mugler, and Hussein Chalayan as inspirations. 3D printing was used for the first time in the fourth season, and the first two-person costume, the first with animatronics, and the first puppet costume were featured. Although adjustments may be made to customize them to celebrities' likings, most costumes turn out identical to her sketches.

A maximum of two fittings are conducted with each celebrity at either the costume shop or Toybina's studio in which a "limited number of people" are present. Before filming occurs, Toybina conducts creative meetings with "every single department" of the show to discuss how to perfect the costumes' looks on camera. Contestants are in costume for no more than 30 minutes at once. During this time, they may wear cooling vests to limit heat exposure and hoods to absorb sweat. Hidden screens inside each mask help them breathe and sing clearly. For those who wear a mask detached from their costume's body, a face stocking, paint, or makeup is used to disguise their skin color. Costumes are sanitized between tapings and repaired if needed as no backups exist.

Toybina left her role following the sixth season, with Tim Chappel, who served as the costume designer for the Australian version of the show, taking her spot beginning in the seventh season.

==== Set ====
The stage as it appeared in the third season

According to its designer James Pearse Connelly, the set is based on the Thai version of the show and is inspired by the stage designs of electronic dance music festivals. The front is X-shaped and features an LED interior (allowing for video to be played) enclosed with smoked, tinted glass, while the back is made of shiny black laminate and contains space for trap doors and special effects underneath. The performance floor is flat to prevent tripping hazards and is bordered upstage by two 25-foot-tall (7.6 m) polygon faces with wide mouths as entrances and exits. A curved LED screen spans the space between the faces and a large logo of the show is hung above it.

The stage is surrounded by seats for about 300 audience members and the panelists are seated behind them on a raised platform at a mask-shaped desk. The panelists' placement away from the stage allows them to move around during performances, helping the director tell a story. Rather than sitting and speaking into a microphone attached to the desk which would limit their mobility, the panelists wear miniature headsets made by Shure. Many on-stage set pieces were replaced with virtual reality elements and the panelists' desk was lengthened due to social distancing requirements during filming in the COVID-19 pandemic. Backstage, a Batcave-inspired area contains costumes displayed like mannequins in a museum.

=== Song selection and rehearsals ===
Pick Ibarra said selecting which songs they sing is a collaborative process; both the performers and producers submit "ideas [which] merge as [the songs] go through the clearance process". While music publishers were reluctant to grant licenses for use in the first season as they were not told who would be performing their songs, this process became easier by the second. Producers gravitate towards songs "that help tell the overall story" of one's costume and ask those who are famous singers to select songs of a genre they are not known for so viewers will be surprised when they are revealed. Tyler "Ninja" Blevins, "Ice Cream" in the second season, stated he "definitely got to pick the songs", but producers wanted them to be mainstream so viewers would connect to them. Other contestants remarked they sometimes disagreed with producers' song choices. Multiple songs are chosen and practiced at the same time; some will not be performed if a contestant is eliminated.

Before the competition, vocal coaches and choreographers work with the celebrities for multiple days to determine their strengths and help improve their technique. Tori Spelling, "Unicorn" in the first season, said contestants are given three weeks to practice before their first performance, although only a couple of rehearsals are conducted before then, and the amount of practice time becomes shorter as the season progresses. According to director Alex Rudzinski, contestants generally practice in the week leading up to their performances. Their first rehearsals on stage occur for about half an hour the day before a taping, and a 10–15 minute "camera dress rehearsal sequence" is conducted several hours before filming. Celebrities may train on their own time to better compete and do cardio exercises to prepare for performances.

=== Filming ===
==== Clue packages ====
Each celebrity attends one or two voice-over sessions to record audio for their respective clue packages. Due to the length and varying filming locations of the video component, stand-ins are used to give them additional performance practice time. In describing their creation, Wade said "you have to plan stuff and at least drive people down avenues". They may reveal a contestant is an athlete, but not the sport they compete in. McCartney said contestants are interviewed every week of the competition and have their answers fact-checked by producers. Producers listen to podcasts and read contestants' books; if a fact is on Wikipedia, they try to avoid mentioning it. No physical filming occurred in the fourth season due to the COVID-19 pandemic; producers worked with Fox-owned Bento Box Entertainment to create animated videos.

==== Performances ====
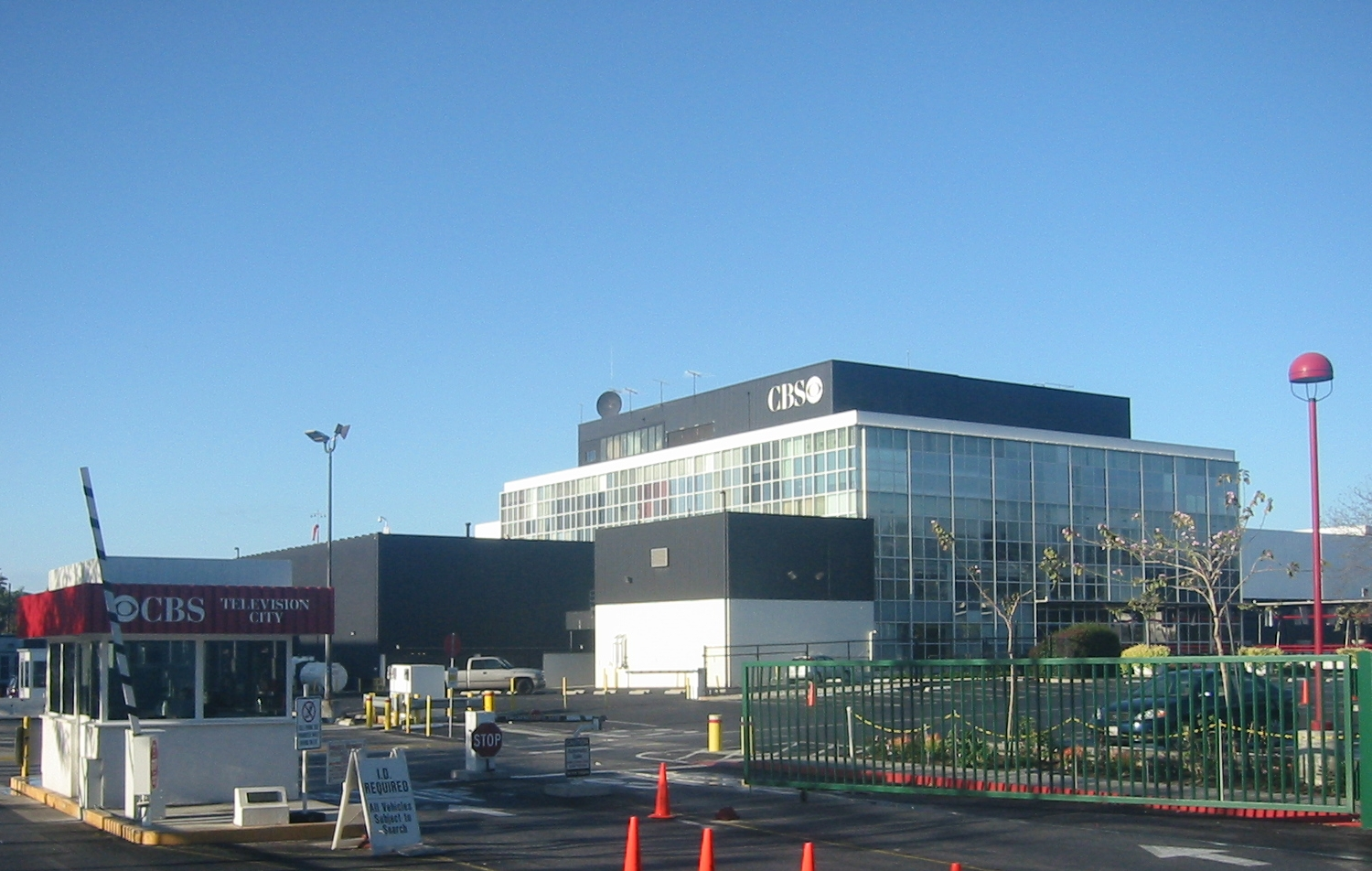
Television City, the filming location of the first three seasons

Filming of the first three seasons took place at Television City in Los Angeles, after which production moved to Red Studios Hollywood. With three episodes often filmed per week, the show has a much shorter filming schedule than others. Dates are selected to accommodate celebrities' other activities. Choosing to tape the series rather than broadcast it live was a difficult decision, Pick Ibarra said, but a necessary one because the time commitment would have prevented celebrities from participating. Following the third season, Rudzinski said while an entire season would unlikely be aired live as "being able to edit helps us tell [a] story", a live broadcast remains possible. Before performances occur, Rudzinski receives detailed musical breakdowns of the songs contestants will sing. Based on their beat and structure, he creates a storyboard for each performance. Brad Duns has also acted as director.

Except for the fourth and fifth seasons, during which the audience was virtual, a taping begins with them seated next to the stage and a warm-up comedian telling jokes to loosen them up. They are encouraged to act excited by clapping, cheering, and chanting the names of costumes while the production crew records their reactions for later use. Shortly thereafter, the panelists arrive, and the host introduces the first contestant. The clue package plays on the large screen in the studio, and the celebrity enters and performs with at least one background singer accompanying them offstage. They wear in-ear monitors and may use a headset inside of their mask to sing instead of a handheld microphone, opting to use one only as a prop on stage. A teleprompter displays song lyrics as an aid. According to Plestis, the contestants have one take to sing live. Rob Gronkowski, "White Tiger" in the third season, said this was true; after missing lyrics during a performance, he never received an offer from producers to re-record them afterwards. The contestants' vocals are intended to sound like the songs' original artists; if they used Auto-Tune processing, then such effects are applied in post-production.

After a celebrity sings, their performance is conducted again with background singers only, allowing producers additional audience reactions to film. During this time, they are allowed to cool down in one of the air-conditioned rooms backstage. After all performances and guesses conclude, the panelists and audience vote for their favorite singer. Except during the fourth and fifth seasons, the producers film the studio audience acting out how they would react to one's elimination, with less than two dozen "extremely well-vetted" people (either friends and family of the celebrity or the show's production crew) remaining on set during the actual reveal. The celebrity is allowed to have their hair and makeup fixed backstage before they are unmasked on camera. As they reveal themselves, the panelists and audience chant "take! it! off!" and "Who Are You" by the Who—which is also the show's opening theme song—plays in the background. Afterward, panelists are discouraged from researching possible answers to the clues presented to them for contestants remaining in the competition between episode tapings.

== Series overview ==
Series overview
Season	Contestants	Episodes	Originally released		Winner(s)	Runner(s)-up	Ref.
Season	Contestants	Episodes	First released	Last released	Winner(s)	Runner(s)-up	Ref.
1	12	10	January 2, 2019	February 27, 2019	T-Pain as "Monster"	Donny Osmond as "Peacock"	
2	16	13	September 25, 2019	December 18, 2019	Wayne Brady as "Fox"	Chris Daughtry as "Rottweiler"	
3	18	17	February 2, 2020	May 20, 2020	Kandi Burruss as "Night Angel"	Jesse McCartney as "Turtle"	
4	16	12	September 23, 2020	December 16, 2020	LeAnn Rimes as "Sun"	Aloe Blacc as "Mushroom"	
5	14	11	March 10, 2021	May 26, 2021	Nick Lachey as "Piglet"	JoJo as "Black Swan"	
6	16	13	September 22, 2021	December 15, 2021	Jewel as "Queen of Hearts"	Todrick Hall as "Bull"	
7 (Note: Also known as The Masked Singer: The Good, The Bad, and The Cuddly.)	15	11	March 9, 2022	May 18, 2022	Teyana Taylor as "Firefly"	Hayley Orrantia as "Ringmaster"	
8	22	12	September 21, 2022	November 30, 2022	Amber Riley as "Harp"	Wilson Phillips as "Lambs"	
9	21	14	February 15, 2023	May 17, 2023	Bishop Briggs as "Medusa"	David Archuleta as "Macaw"	
10	16	11	September 27, 2023	December 20, 2023	Ne-Yo as "Cow"	John Schneider as "Donut"	
11	16	13	March 6, 2024	May 22, 2024	Vanessa Hudgens as "Goldfish"	Scott Porter as "Gumball"	
12	15	12	September 25, 2024	December 18, 2024	Boyz II Men as "Buffalos"	Mario as "Wasp"	
13	15	13	February 12, 2025	May 7, 2025	Gretchen Wilson as "Pearl"	Andy Grammer as "Boogie Woogie"	
14	18	13	January 7, 2026	April 1, 2026	Ashlee Simpson as "Galaxy Girl"	Phillip Phillips as "Pugcasso"	
Specials	-	12	September 15, 2019	December 12, 2023	-	-	

== Broadcast history and release ==
The Masked Singer debuted on January 2, 2019, as a mid-season replacement to Star. A month before the season finale on February 27, 2019, Fox renewed the show for a second season. During its upfronts for the 2019–2020 United States television season in May 2019, the network renewed the series for a third season to launch as the lead-out of Super Bowl LIV. The second season premiered on September 25, 2019, and was preceded by a "Super Sneak Peek" episode which aired two Sundays prior. Before concluding on December 18, 2019, it was pre-empted for two weeks by the broadcast of the 2019 World Series. On February 2, 2020, the third season premiered following Super Bowl LIV. After a "Road to the Finals" episode aired the previous day, it culminated on May 20, 2020. Two weeks prior, the series was renewed for a fourth season to air during the 2020–2021 television season. Following a preview episode on September 13, it premiered on September 23, 2020. One week of the season was pre-empted due to the 2020 World Series. Two weeks before the finale on December 16, 2020, the series was renewed for a fifth season, which premiered on March 10, 2021. On May 17, 2021, Fox renewed the series for a sixth season a week before the fifth season's finale on May 26. The sixth season began airing starting with a two-night premiere on September 22 and 23, 2021. A seventh season premiered on March 9, 2022. On May 15, 2023, it was announced that the series was renewed for a tenth season. On May 7, 2025, it was announced that starting with season fourteen, the series would air annually in the winter; the season premiered on January 7, 2026. On May 8, 2026, it was announced that the series was renewed for a fifteenth season.

The program is aired by Fox in the United States and has been simulcasted by CTV in Canada since the second season. Fox Entertainment distributes the series in those countries while Propagate Content does so elsewhere. Outside of North America, it has aired on ITV in the United Kingdom, Network 10 in Australia, Three in New Zealand, M-Net in South Africa, and Channel 5 in Singapore, among others. Aside from double-length episodes, most run for about 43 minutes. They are available for streaming in the United States on Hulu, Fox's website, and the Fox Now mobile app through video on demand. The Masked Singer is also available on the American ad-supported service Tubi, where it became the most-watched series less than two months after its April 2020 debut and is used to attract new viewers to the platform. Episodes are available internationally on localized streaming services.

== Reception ==
=== Television viewership and ratings ===
Viewership and ratings per season of The Masked Singer. TV season ranks/averages include seven-day DVR playback.
Season	Timeslot (ET)	Episodes	First aired		Last aired		TV season	Viewership rank	Avg. viewers (millions)	18–49 rank	Avg. 18–49 rating
Season	Timeslot (ET)	Episodes	Date	Viewers (millions)	Date	Viewers (millions)	TV season	Viewership rank	Avg. viewers (millions)	18–49 rank	Avg. 18–49 rating
1	Wednesday 9:00 p.m.	10	January 2, 2019	9.37	February 27, 2019	11.48	2018–2019	13	11.57	3	3.8
2	Wednesday 8:00 p.m.	13	September 25, 2019	8.03	December 18, 2019	8.36	2019–2020	12	10.73	3	3.2
3	Wednesday 8:00 p.m.	17	February 2, 2020	23.70	May 20, 2020	9.01	2019–2020	12	10.73	3	3.2
4	Wednesday 8:00 p.m.	12	September 23, 2020	5.92	December 16, 2020	7.41	2020–2021	23	7.56	3	2.0
5	Wednesday 8:00 p.m.	11	March 10, 2021	5.66	May 26, 2021	5.51	2020–2021	23	7.56	3	2.0
6	Wednesday 8:00 p.m.	13	September 22, 2021	4.74	December 15, 2021	5.08	2021–2022	40	5.85	8	1.2
7	Wednesday 8:00 p.m.	11	March 9, 2022	4.15	May 18, 2022	4.19	2021–2022	40	5.85	8	1.2
8	Wednesday 8:00 p.m.	12	September 21, 2022	3.70	November 30, 2022	4.18	2022–2023	44	5.11	10	0.9
9	Wednesday 8:00 p.m.	14	February 15, 2023	3.71	May 17, 2023	3.73	2022–2023	44	5.11	10	0.9
10	Wednesday 8:00 p.m.	11	September 27, 2023	3.22	December 20, 2023	3.76	2023–2024	48	4.37	27	0.6
11	Wednesday 8:00 p.m.	13	March 6, 2024	3.29	May 22, 2024	2.99	2023–2024	48	4.37	27	0.6
12	Wednesday 8:00 p.m.	12	September 25, 2024	2.90	December 18, 2024	3.16	2024–2025	TBD	TBD	TBD	TBD
13	Wednesday 8:00 p.m.	13	February 12, 2025	3.06	May 7, 2025	2.89	2024–2025	TBD	TBD	TBD	TBD

In both 2019 and 2020, the show was named the "Hottest Reality/Competition Series" in the United States by Adweek. Excluding post-NFL game debuts, the program's premiere was the highest-rated for an unscripted television series in the country since The X Factor in 2011. Ratings grew toward the end of the first season, and The Masked Singer concluded the 2018–2019 American television season as the highest-rated new series in the key demographic of adults 18–49 and the first unscripted series to rank number one in the genre in its first season since Joe Millionaire in 2003. TV Guide named it the television season's "most underestimated show". During the following television season, the series was one of two non-NFL programs to charge over $200,000 per 30 seconds of advertising. Deadline Hollywood cited the second season as a major reason Fox—for the first time in the network's history—ranked number one in fall entertainment programming.

The premiere of the third season following Super Bowl LIV became the series' most-watched episode. Throughout the season's latter half which aired amid the COVID-19 pandemic in the United States, episodes experienced a rise in viewership compared to those broadcast before the outbreak. Although the 18–49 rating was lower than the first's, the show remained the top non-sports program in the demographic. During the 2020–2021 United States television season, ad prices for the show increased 12 percent to about $226,000 per 30 seconds. While the highest-rated entertainment broadcast since the third season's finale, the first episode of the fourth season tied for the series' lowest at the time. A broadcast following a Thanksgiving NFL game was the most-watched and highest-rated of the series excluding the post-Super Bowl episode since the first season's finale. With the fourth and fifth season's ratings, The Masked Singer remained the highest-rated entertainment program among adults 18–49 for the third consecutive television season. By the seventh season, the show's viewership declined to less than half of the first season's audience, though it is still considered above-average given similar trends for other programs.

Simulcasts of the show are popular in Canada; all of the premieres and finales have ranked within the top 10 most-watched programs in the weeks they aired according to audience measurement company Numeris. The post-Super Bowl LIV premiere of the third season was viewed by 2.35 million, the most for a Super Bowl lead-out in the country since 2012. During the 2019–2020 Canadian television season, it was the eighth most-watched series overall. In Australia, The Masked Singer debuted on September 30, 2020, to ratings significantly smaller than others in its timeslot. With 285,000 viewers, The Music attributed its low viewership to a culture barrier and that reveals are well-publicized by the time the series airs. After viewership fell to 125,000 a month later, the program was moved to a less favorable timeslot.

=== Critical response ===
The show received a mixed reception from television critics; their critiques were classified as "befuddled" by The Hollywood Reporter. Review aggregation website Rotten Tomatoes reported a 52 percent approval rating for the first season, with an average rating of 4 out of 10, based on 25 reviews. Its critical consensus states: "Defying all tropes of the reality competition genre, The Masked Singer manages to be both magnetically apocalyptic and inexplicably boring." Metacritic, which uses a weighted average, assigned the series a score of 36 out of 100 based on 10 critics reviewing the first season, indicating "generally unfavorable reviews".

==== Concept and appeal ====
Critics contrasted the series to other reality television programs in the United States. Entertainment Weekly's Joseph Longo considered it the most captivating competition series since The Voice premiered in 2011, and Stuart Heritage of The Guardian called it one of the best singing competition shows in a decade. Writing for NBC News' Think, Ani Bundel thought the series has an advantage over Dancing with the Stars and The Voice because voting bias is less likely when competitors are unknown. Kelly Lawler of USA Today agreed, praising the avoidance of overproduced backstories, harsh criticisms, and results episodes. The Daily Beast's Laura Bradley felt it was better than Dancing with the Stars because costumes can be used to generate interest instead of casting those "who seek to overplay their 15 minutes of fame". As she considered its format more complex than Top Chef or Dancing with the Stars, Erin Schwartz of The Nation considered The Masked Singer's success surprising.

The show received comparisons to the original version of the franchise. Despite its strong viewership indicating the "changes [between it and the South Korean version] seem to have worked", some felt the competition length is too slow in comparison, and makes reveals occur long after established consensuses, about who the celebrities are, have formed, nullifying the excitement surrounding them. While contestants on the South Korean series sing the same songs during a duet round, producers' decision not to do so in the American version was also thought of as an "ill-advised" decision by critics as they felt it inhibits fair comparisons. Conversely, for V's Hannah Hightman, the series "retains the bizarreness of King of Mask Singer but adds a distinctly American style, creating an infectiously fun reality TV classic". According to Drew Millard of The Outline, the show is better than previous American adaptations of Asian television series because it is "even crazier than the original".

Critics regarded the program as having a positive nature. John Doyle of The Globe and Mail cited it as a cultural change in the United States away from the competitive and often exploitative essence of reality shows like American Idol. Opining in The Washington Post, Sonia Rao thought the series' ethos is its support of eccentricity. Matt Zoller Seitz of Vulture named it the best example of escapism on television, and Variety's Daniel D'Addario called it a return to form for the medium as he thought it possesses the now-rare ability to uplift and unite people. Lawler agreed, remarking it was perhaps "the only reality TV show that doesn't manufacture its fun". Schwartz considered it "the rare show on television that allows viewers to turn off their brains, sit back, and enjoy" and felt panelists compliment competitors despite the quality of their performances. The way contestants are eliminated has garnered praise for being dignified, though those of "vocal legend[s]" such as Patti LaBelle, Dionne Warwick, and Chaka Khan have been criticized for being premature.

==== Performance and production ====
The costume designs have received praise for being inventive, intricate, and impressive. Opinions of the performances have differed; Variety's Caroline Framke described them as mediocre, The New Yorker's Emily Nussbaum thought the choreography was elaborate, and Entertainment Weekly's Kristen Baldwin said some celebrities sound professional while others are more karaoke-like. The way the show is edited has attracted criticism; guesses have been called repetitive, episodes excessive in length, and unmaskings slow. Writing for Decider, Joel Keller found the program's pacing overwhelming. To fix the "manufactured" feeling, Hanh Nguyen of IndieWire felt a live broadcast would add excitement, as did those from Gold Derby and E! Online. Viewers on the West Coast discover which celebrity is unmasked later than those on the East Coast because the show is not aired live across all time zones.

==== Cast and commentary ====
Reviewers referred to the status of celebrities competing. Rob Harvilla of The Ringer wrote that they are either stars of decades past or only have thin connections to actual celebrities and Ali stated the show's "idea of celebrity is fairly elastic". According to Hannah Hightman, the series is "a haven for B-list celebs". Alison de Souza of The Straits Times said the series has never featured an A-lister. With both traditional Hollywood celebrities and reality show stars participating, some indicated the hierarchies of fame are no longer as defined as they once were. Conversely, Adam White of The Daily Telegraph attributed the show's success in part to the "relative starriness of its participants" and BBC News' Neil Smith considered it a "particularly starry" version of the franchise. In her book Transnational Korean Television, the scholar Hyejung Ju argued almost all of the contestants are well-known. In contrast to the New Zealand edition, Jenni Mortimer of The New Zealand Herald said "the celebrity pull on the US version is huge". The series has received criticism for having politicians such as Sarah Palin and Rudy Giuliani as contestants, with the latter causing panelists Ken Jeong and Robin Thicke to walk out.

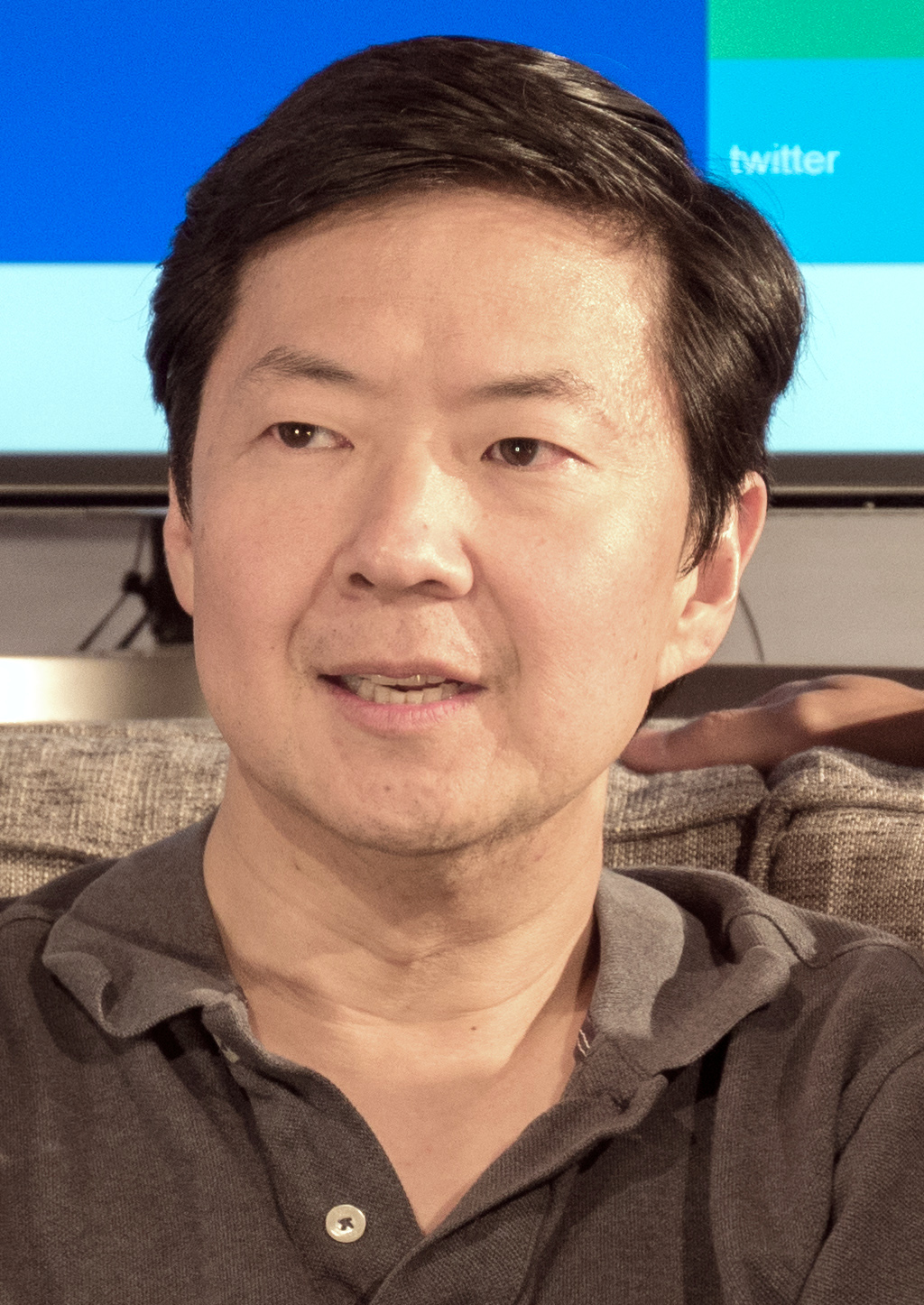
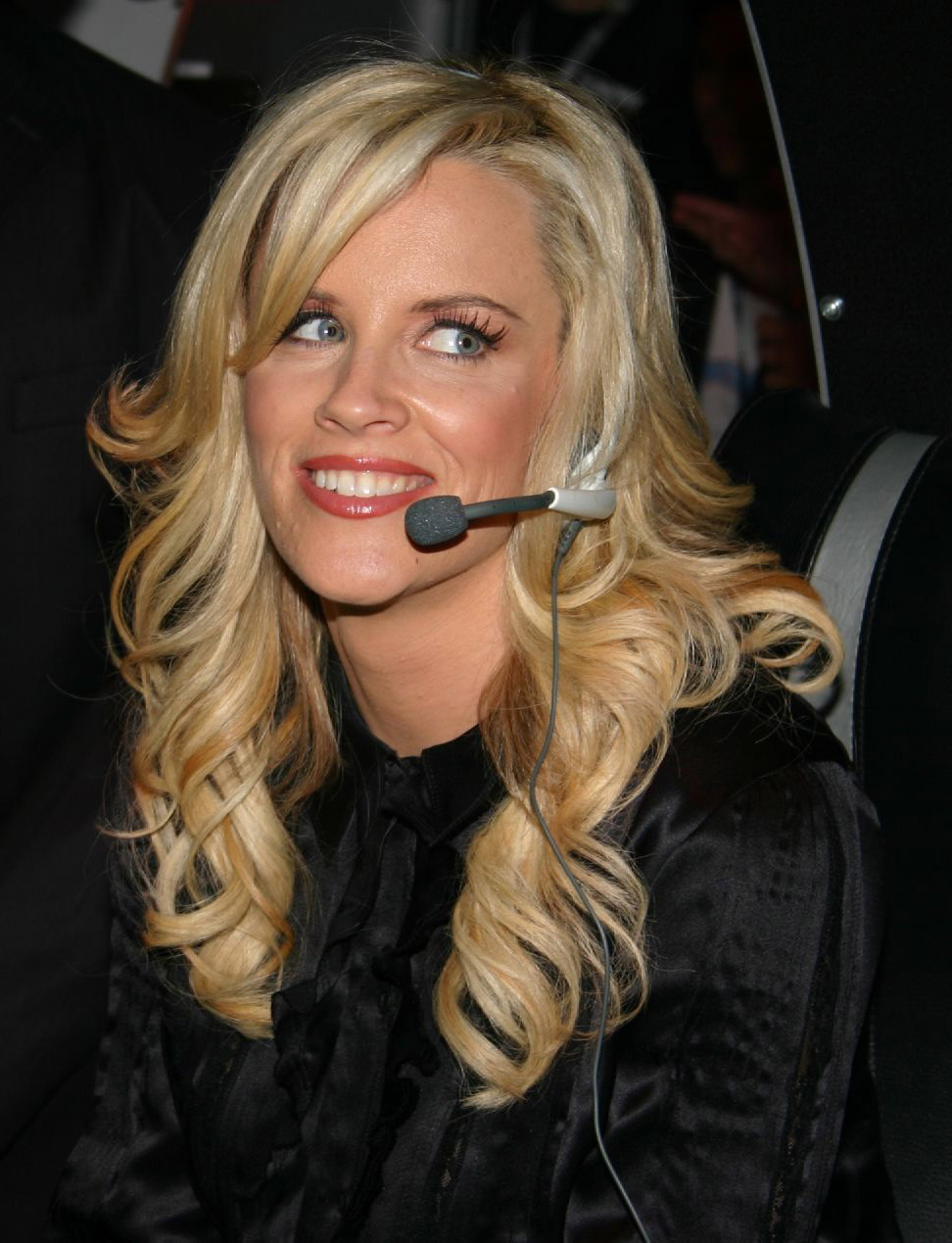
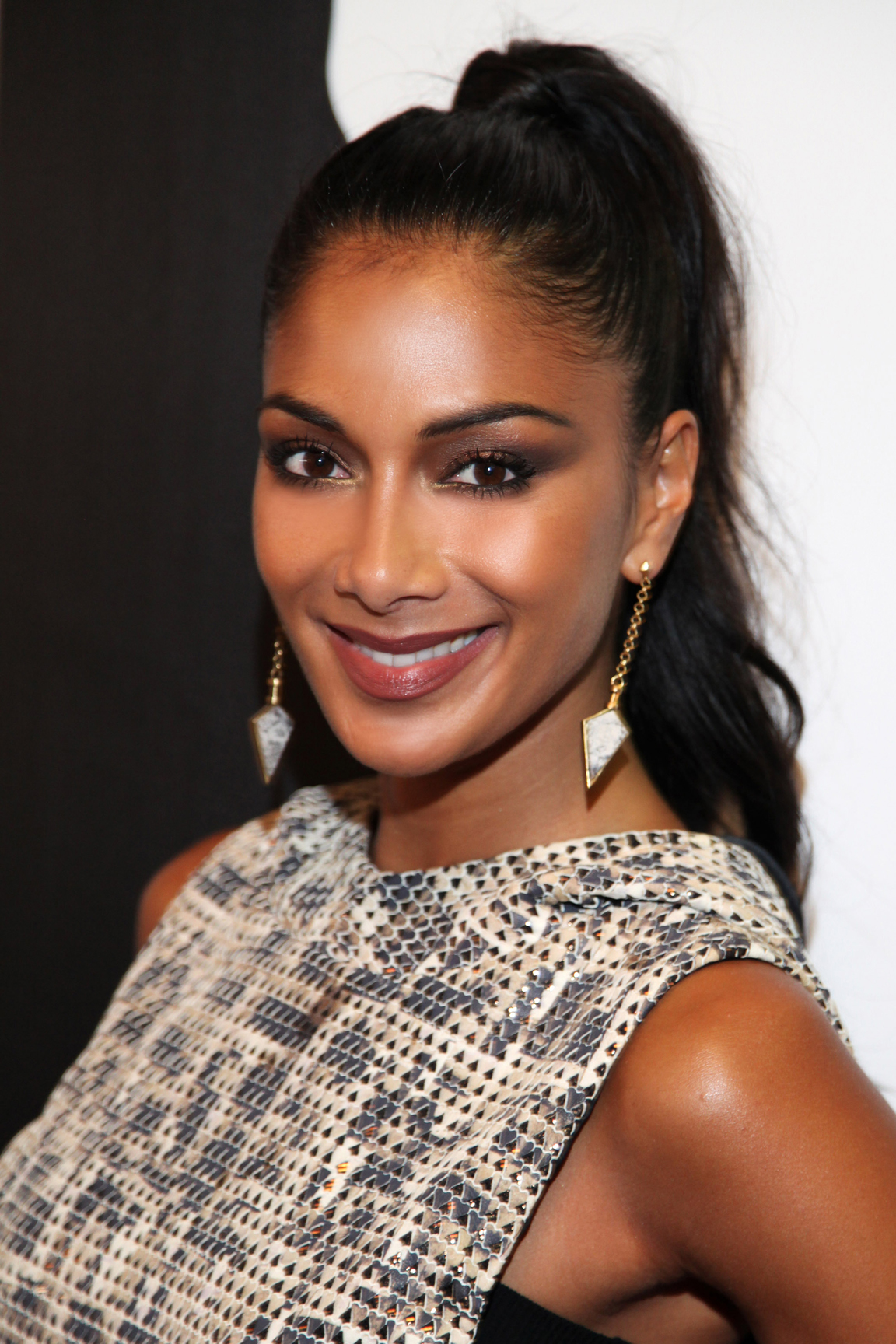
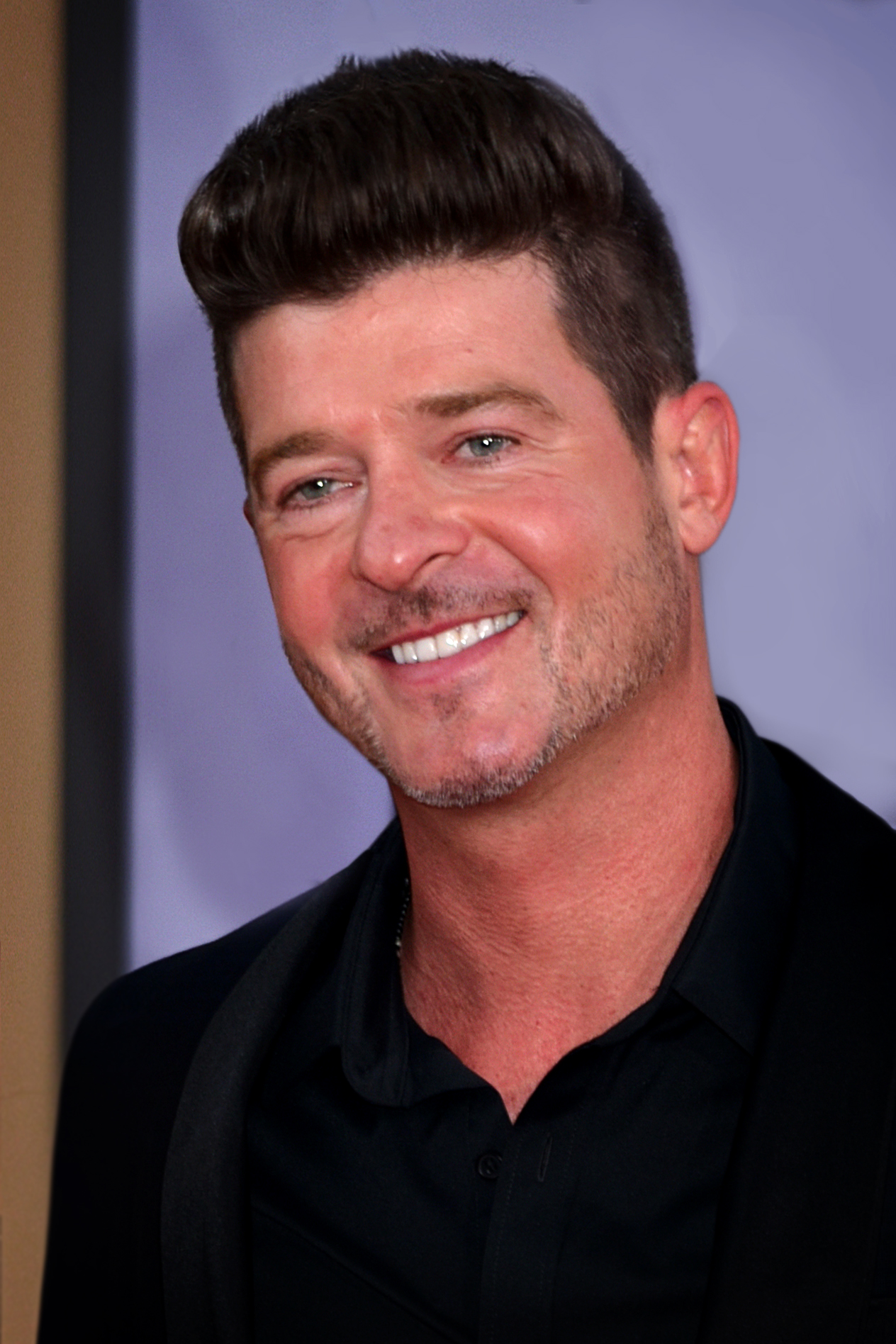
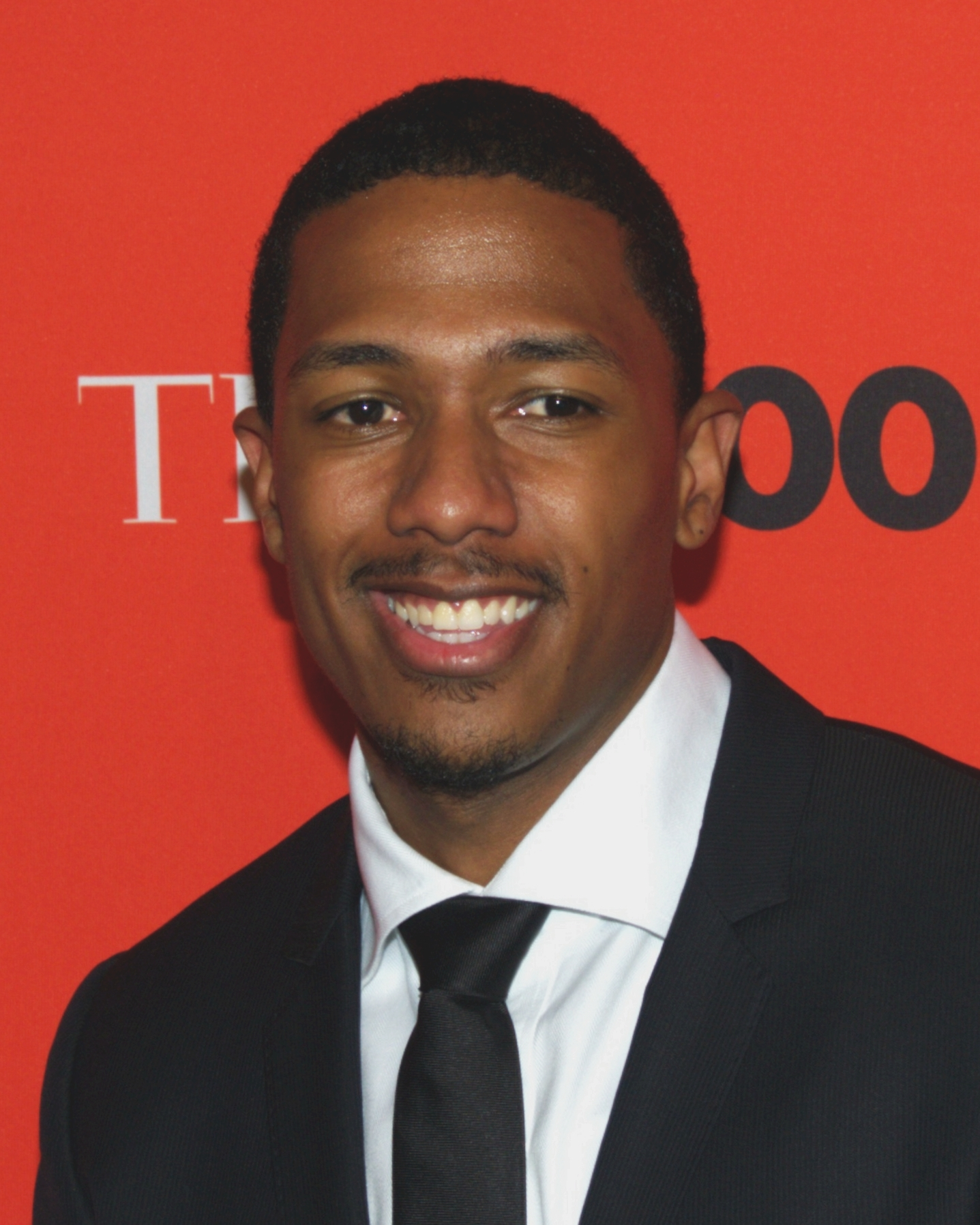
L–R: Ken Jeong, Jenny McCarthy Wahlberg, Nicole Scherzinger, Robin Thicke, Nick Cannon

Critics felt the panelists undermined the program with pointless statements and awkward interactions. Describing McCarthy Wahlberg as inexperienced, Scherzinger as dull, Jeong as over-the-top, and Thicke as too serious, Kelly Lawler named them the worst panel in reality television history. Rachel Desantis of the New York Daily News thought all except Jeong were unfunny; Miles Surrey of The Ringer disagreed, stating Jeong was annoying. Quartz's Adam Epstein predicted the panelists could be the show's downfall. Their guesses have been called stupid, absurd, worthless, and "the worst part of the [show]" by those who viewed them as implausible. In dissenting, The Daily Beast's Jordan Julian felt they made the panelists "surprisingly entertaining" and D'Addario compared the panelists favorably to the original American Idol judges who he perceived as non-experts in their fields.

Cannon's role on the series has divided critics. The Washington Post's Emily Yahr felt he "was made for" the show due to his years of experience in the same role "seeing oddities" on America's Got Talent, and Keller thought he "learned his lesson" from that program by being less distracting. Conversely, Doyle called Cannon "as inarticulate as a three-year-old" and Longo remarked he was overshadowed by the presence and commentary of McCarthy Wahlberg. McCarthy Wahlberg's role on the show was criticized by Seitz and Sam Barsanti of The A.V. Club due to her views on vaccines.

=== Cultural impact ===
The series' success is attributed to subsequent local adaptations of the Masked Singer franchise. It is part of the Korean wave and follows fellow late 2010s American television shows Better Late Than Never and The Good Doctor, which are also based on South Korean programs. International interest in adapting other costume-centered formats such as Wild Things and Sexy Beasts has been credited to the series' success, as has the debut of other guessing game shows on Fox. An American version of the South Korean game show I Can See Your Voice, which features contestants guessing whether singers are good or bad without hearing them sing for a chance to win money, began airing on the network in 2020. Jeong hosts along with a panel and a "musical superstar" who aid the contestant. It followed episodes of The Masked Singer's fourth season, creating a two-hour programming block based on South Korean formats and featuring Jeong. Game of Talents, another international guessing game adaptation, is hosted by season two winner Wayne Brady and aired after episodes of The Masked Singer's fifth season. In April 2021, an unofficial online fundraiser version of the show featuring Broadway performers titled Broadway's Masked Singer was held in support of Broadway Cares/Equity Fights AIDS.

The program has played a major role in Fox's success as an independent network and in-house production company Fox Alternative Entertainment. As a result, Wade described an increased openness to new ideas when shows are pitched. He also predicted more direct relationships between Asian production companies and American television networks would form. Masked Singer was MBC's first format sold to the United States market. Plestis subsequently signed a deal with Tokyo Broadcasting System to develop new television formats and launched an American edition of the South Korean game show My Little Television for TBS. Due in part to her success with The Masked Singer, British production company Studio Lambert signed a similar deal with Pick Ibarra.

=== Awards and nominations ===
Awards and nominations
Award	Year (Note: Indicates the year of ceremony)	Category	Nominee(s)	Result	Ref.
Art Directors Guild Awards	2021	Variety, Reality or Competition Series	James Pearse Connelly (Note: For "The Season Premiere – The Masks Return")	Nominated	
Costume Designers Guild Awards	2020	Excellence in Variety, Reality-Competition, Live Television	Marina Toybina (Note: For "Season Finale: And The Winner Takes It All and Takes It Off")	Won	
Costume Designers Guild Awards	2021	Excellence in Variety, Reality-Competition, Live Television	Marina Toybina (Note: For "The Semi Finals – The Super Six")	Nominated	
Costume Designers Guild Awards	2022	Excellence in Variety, Reality-Competition, Live Television	Marina Toybina, Gabrielle Letamendi (Note: For "2 Night Season Premiere, Part 2: Back to School")	Nominated	
Costume Designers Guild Awards	2024	Excellence in Variety, Reality-Competition, Live Television	Marina Toybina, Steven Norman Lee (Note: For "One Hit Wonders Night")	Nominated	
Costume Designers Guild Awards	2024	Excellence in Variety, Reality-Competition, Live Television	Tim Chappel (Note: For "'80s Night")	Nominated	
Critics' Choice Real TV Awards	2019	Best Competition Series: Talent/Variety	The Masked Singer	Won	
Critics' Choice Real TV Awards	2021	Best Competition Series: Talent/Variety	The Masked Singer	Won	
Critics' Choice Real TV Awards	2023	Best Competition Series: Talent/Variety	The Masked Singer	Nominated	
Critics' Choice Real TV Awards	2024	Best Competition Series: Talent/Variety	The Masked Singer	Nominated	
Gracie Awards	2020	Showrunner – Unscripted	Izzie Pick Ibarra	Won	
Guild of Music Supervisors Awards	2021	Best Music Supervision – Reality Television	Meryl Ginsberg (Note: For season three)	Won	
Hollywood Critics Association TV Awards	2021	Best Broadcast Network Reality Series, Competition Series, or Game Show	The Masked Singer	Won	
Hollywood Critics Association TV Awards	2022	Best Broadcast Network Reality Show or Competition Series	The Masked Singer	Nominated	
Kids' Choice Awards	2020	Favorite Reality Show	The Masked Singer	Nominated	
Kids' Choice Awards	2020	Favorite TV Host	Nick Cannon	Nominated	
Kids' Choice Awards	2021	Favorite Reality Show	The Masked Singer	Nominated	
Kids' Choice Awards	2022	Favorite Reality Show	The Masked Singer	Nominated	
Kids' Choice Awards	2023	Favorite Reality Show	The Masked Singer	Nominated	
Kids' Choice Awards	2025	Favorite Reality TV Show	The Masked Singer	Nominated	
MTV Movie & TV Awards	2019	Best Host	Nick Cannon	Nominated	
MTV Movie & TV Awards	2021	Best Competition Series	The Masked Singer	Nominated	
MTV Movie & TV Awards	2022	Best Competition Series	The Masked Singer	Nominated	
MTV Movie & TV Awards	2023	Best Host	Nick Cannon	Nominated	
People's Choice Awards	2019	The Competition Show of 2019	The Masked Singer	Nominated	
People's Choice Awards	2019	The Competition Contestant of 2019	T-Pain (Note: Competed as "Monster" in the first season)	Nominated	
People's Choice Awards	2020	The Show of 2020	The Masked Singer	Nominated	
People's Choice Awards	2020	The Competition Show of 2020	The Masked Singer	Nominated	
People's Choice Awards	2020	The Competition Contestant of 2020	Kandi Burruss (Note: Competed as "Night Angel" in the third season)	Nominated	
People's Choice Awards	2020	The Competition Contestant of 2020	Rob Gronkowski (Note: Competed as "White Tiger" in the third season)	Nominated	
People's Choice Awards	2021	The Competition Show of 2021	The Masked Singer	Nominated	
People's Choice Awards	2021	The Competition Contestant of 2021	JoJo (Note: Competed as "Black Swan" in the fifth season)	Nominated	
People's Choice Awards	2021	The Competition Contestant of 2021	Wiz Khalifa (Note: Competed as "Chameleon" in the fifth season)	Nominated	
People's Choice Awards	2022	The Competition Show of 2022	The Masked Singer	Nominated	
People's Choice Awards	2022	The Competition Contestant of 2022	Teyana Taylor (Note: Competed as "Firefly" in the seventh season)	Nominated	
People's Choice Awards	2024	The Host of the Year	Nick Cannon	Nominated	
Primetime Creative Arts Emmy Awards	2019	Outstanding Costumes for a Variety, Nonfiction, or Reality Programming	Marina Toybina, Grainne O'Sullivan (Note: For "Season Finale: The Final Mask is Lifted")	Nominated	
Primetime Creative Arts Emmy Awards	2020	Outstanding Costumes for a Variety, Nonfiction, or Reality Programming	Marina Toybina, Grainne O'Sullivan, Gabrielle Letamendi, Candice Rainwater (Note: For "The Season Kick off Mask Off: Group A")	Won	
Primetime Creative Arts Emmy Awards	2021	Outstanding Costumes for a Variety, Nonfiction, or Reality Programming	Marina Toybina, Grainne O'Sullivan, Gabrielle Letamendi, Lucia Maldonado (Note: For "Super 8 – The Plot Chickens! Part 2")	Won	
Primetime Creative Arts Emmy Awards	2021	Outstanding Production Design for a Variety, Reality or Competition Series	James Pearse Connelly, Ryan Suchor, Lisa Nelson (Note: For "The Season Premiere – The Masks Return")	Nominated	
Primetime Creative Arts Emmy Awards	2021	Outstanding Lighting Design/Lighting Direction for a Variety Series	Simon Miles, Cory Fournier, Maurice Dupleasis (Note: For "The Spicy 6 – The Competition Heats Up!")	Nominated	
Primetime Creative Arts Emmy Awards	2022	Outstanding Lighting Design/Lighting Direction for a Variety Series	Simon Miles, Cory Fournier (Note: For "Group A Semi-Final")	Nominated	
Primetime Creative Arts Emmy Awards	2022	Outstanding Technical Direction, Camerawork, Video Control for a Series	Christine Salomon, Nat Havholm, Mark Koonce, Brett Crutcher, Adam Margolis, Rob Palmer, Ron Lehman, Bert Atkinson, Bettina Levesque, Jeff Wheat, Kary D'Alessandro, Daryl Studebaker, John Goforth, Cary Symmons, Sean Flannery, Darin Gallacher, Chris Hill (Note: For "Masks Back — The Good, The Bad & The Cuddly — Round 1")	Nominated	
Primetime Creative Arts Emmy Awards	2024	Outstanding Technical Direction and Camerawork for a Series	Christine Salomon, Cary Symmons, Bert Atkinson, Brett Crutcher, Kary D'Allesandro, Jimmy Garcia, John Goforth, Sean Flannery, Bettina Levesque, Adam Margolis, Mark Koonce, Daryl Studebaker, James Sullivan, Rob Palmer (Note: For "New York Night")	Nominated	
Primetime Emmy Awards	2020	Outstanding Competition Program	The Masked Singer	Nominated	
Producers Guild of America Awards	2020	Outstanding Producer of Game & Competition Television	Craig Plestis, Izzie Pick Ibarra, Nikki Varhely-Gillingham, Rosie Seitchik, Stacey Thomas-Muir, Nick Cannon, Ashley Sylvester, Lindsay Tuggle, Pete Cooksley, Chelsea Candelaria, Anne Chanthavong, Zoë Ritchken, Deena Katz, Erin Brady, Jeff Kmiotek, Lexi Shoemaker (Note: For season one)	Nominated	
Producers Guild of America Awards	2021	Outstanding Producer of Game & Competition Television	Craig Plestis, Izzie Pick Ibarra, Rosie Seitchik, Nick Cannon, James Breen, Deena Katz, Lindsay Tuggle, Chris Wagner, Patrizia DiMaria, Brian Updyke, Jeff Kmiotek, Lauren Taylor Harding, Nick Campagna, Erin Brady, Tiana Gandelman, Kristin Campbell-Taylor, Lindsay John, Dom Worden, Peter Hebri, Zoë Ritchken, Lexi Shoemaker, Mike Riccio, Emily Smith, Chelsea Candelaria, Joseph Warwick (Note: For seasons three and four)	Nominated	
Shorty Awards	2019	Best in Entertainment Sites & Apps	The Masked Singer Social Hub	Nominated	
Teen Choice Awards	2019	Choice Reality TV Show	The Masked Singer	Nominated	

== Spin-offs ==
=== The Masked Singer: After the Mask ===
Due to the impact of the COVID-19 pandemic on television, Fox postponed the premieres of some scripted series to late 2020 and opted to create The Masked Singer: After the Mask as one of two shows that could be produced remotely to fill the programming gap. Cannon hosted the aftershow; it aired on Wednesdays at 9:00 p.m. (ET) for four weeks following episodes of the third season during which he discusses the outcome of the preceding Masked Singer episode from a "virtual stage" with guests appearing via videotelephony. A performance from the eliminated celebrity is featured at the end of each episode, which are directed by Tom Sullivan and executive produced by Breen, Plestis, and Cannon. CTV broadcast the series in Canada.

The series premiere received a 1.4 rating in the adults 18–49 demographic and about 5.5 million viewers, a "pretty significant improvement" over the average ratings of the previous lead-out, Lego Masters. Subsequent episodes continued to retain about half of The Masked Singer's viewers, which is considered above average for an aftershow. Including DVR, the program concluded the 2019–2020 United States television season with an average viewership of 5.29 million (ranking sixty-eighth among all series broadcast), and an average 18–49 rating of 1.4 (ranking twenty-seventh). According to Variety, it received higher ratings "than shows that probably cost ten times to produce".

=== The Masked Dancer ===
Following the premiere of The Masked Singer in January 2019, Ellen DeGeneres began conducting a parody, "The Masked Dancer", as a recurring segment on her daytime talk show. On January 7, 2020, Fox Alternative Entertainment and Warner Bros. Television announced plans to broadcast The Masked Dancer as a television series. Craig Robinson hosts the show, and Jeong, Brian Austin Green, Paula Abdul, and Ashley Tisdale act as panelists. Like The Masked Singer's format, celebrity contestants wear head-to-toe costumes and face masks concealing their identities, but perform different dance styles. It premiered on Fox on December 27, 2020.

== Other media ==
=== Costume displays ===
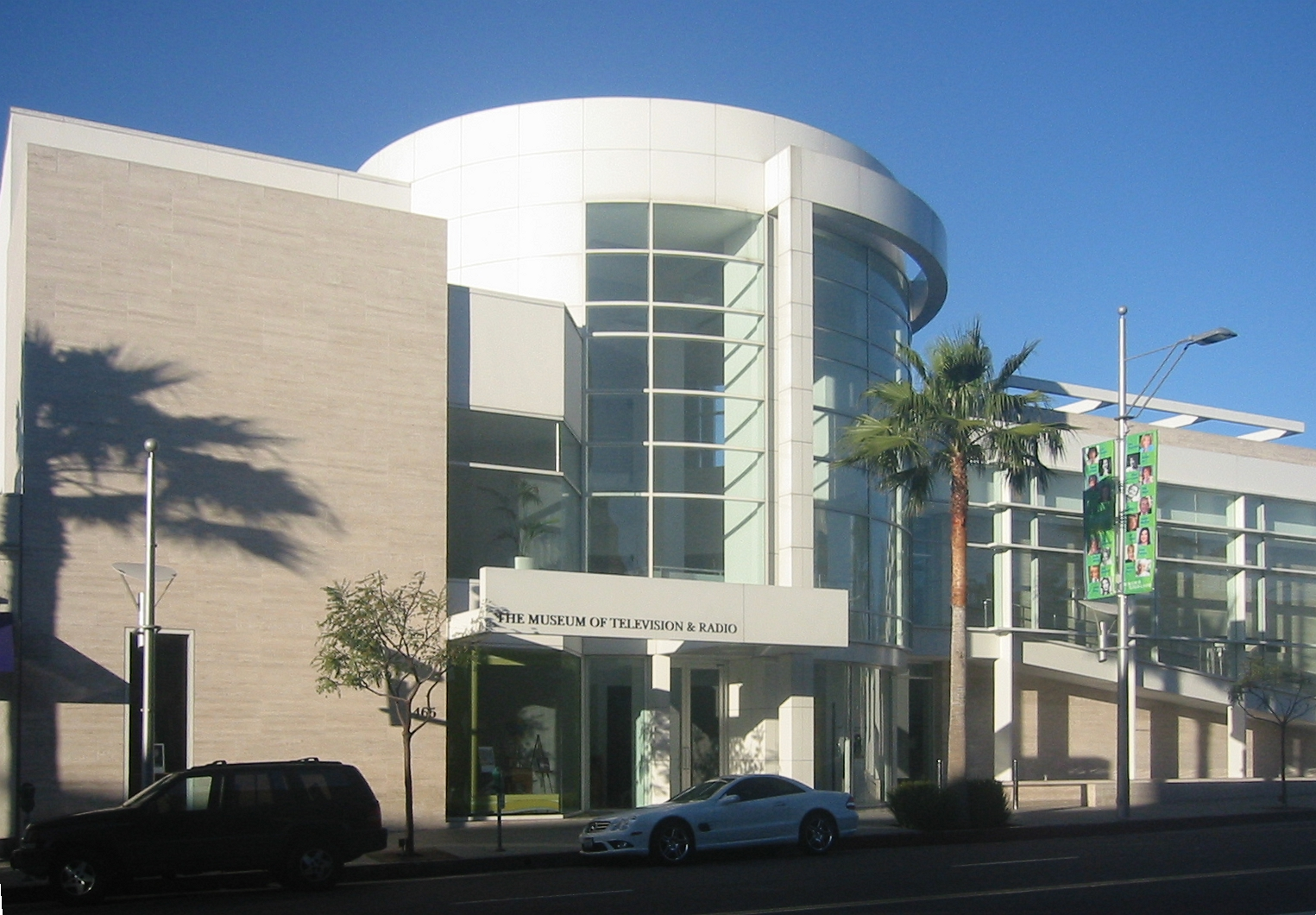
Costumes were displayed in an exhibit at the Paley Center for Media in Los Angeles.

After being worn during a season, the costumes are placed in storage and occasionally displayed. In mid-2019, some from the first season were accompanied by video and Toybina's original sketches in an exhibit, "Fashion & Fantasy: The Art of The Masked Singer", at the Los Angeles Paley Center for Media. Selections were also present at the annual "Art of Television Costume Design" exhibit at the Fashion Institute of Design & Merchandising Museum in Los Angeles from August to October 2019. On February 1, 2020, two costumes were displayed at the Natural History Museum of Los Angeles County as part of a meet-and-greet promotion. For a week in May 2021, costumes from the fifth season were shown in a West Hollywood, California storefront as part of a For Your Consideration campaign for the 73rd Primetime Emmy Awards.

=== Merchandise ===
Hoodies, coffee mugs, phone cases, and other merchandise using the show's branding are purchasable on the series' online store. "Family fun packs" consisting of coloring pages, a word search, and a do it yourself mask were once downloadable on its website, as were official Giphy stickers, clue notebooks, Bingo cards, and phone wallpapers. Images of the series were made available to users on Microsoft Teams and Zoom as custom backgrounds. In October 2020, the show launched an official weekly podcast hosted by Bow Wow. In addition to a post-elimination celebrity interview, it features guests and extra clues. During the fifth season, viewers could use the Fox Bet Super 6 app to answer questions about each episode and be entered into weekly draws to win money, including a grand prize of $100,000. In October 2021, Fox launched an online community known as the "MaskVerse" in which users can trade mask NFTs and communicate on a Discord server.

=== The Masked Singer National Tour ===
In February 2020, it was announced that the program would be getting a live tour with shows in over forty American cities featuring two celebrity hosts and a local mystery celebrity who would be unmasked at the end of each. Originally scheduled for mid-2020, the tour was later postponed to the following year due to the COVID-19 pandemic and eventually delayed indefinitely. In June 2021, Plestis said plans were being materialized and that he hoped it would occur in 2022.

On November 1, 2021, the tour was reannounced for 2022, and later began on May 28. Natasha Bedingfield, who was costumed as "Pepper" in season six, serves as host of the tour. Shows in the tour include previous Masked Singer costumes such as Queen of Hearts, Alien, and Thingamabob. Each show also includes a mystery celebrity, who performs in a tour-specific costume, "Boom Boom Box".
