= Exit (game show) =

2013 American game show TV series

- Genre: Game show
- Directed by: J. Rupert Thompson
- Presented by: Curt Doussett
- Country of origin: United States
- Original language: English
- No. of seasons: 1
- No. of episodes: 6

Production
- Executive producers: Craig Plestis; Danny Fenton; Michael Binkow; Scott St. John
- Running time: 42 minutes
- Production companies: Smart Dog Media; Zig Zag Productions

Original release
- Network: Syfy
- Release: June 4 – July 9, 2013

Exit is an American game show on Syfy that premiered on June 4, 2013.

== Synopsis ==
Based on the Japanese series DERO! (NTV), Exit features four teams of two contestants who compete to escape four rooms that each hold a different challenge. Each room has the contestants solve brain games and puzzles under increasingly stressful circumstances, with the team coming in last place being eliminated from the next round. If the last ones standing complete the final room, they go home with $10,000 cash. The show pretends that losers suffer "lethal" consequences.

=== Beam Room ===
- Contestants stand on 6 ft (1.8 m) planks of metal over a seemingly bottomless pit. They must then solve a series of visual puzzles, usually word puzzles but also celebrity face combinations, as the plank recedes 1 in (2.5 cm) per second. The first team to see the puzzle is permitted 20 seconds to give the correct answer before the puzzle passes to the next team in line; if control is passed, subsequent teams are given 15, 10, and 5 seconds to solve. The first team to fall as the plank recedes completely is eliminated. This room has always been the first and only room to appear in every episode. (First appearance: #1 - "Are You Ready to Play?")

=== Rooms 2 & 3 ===
- Freeze Blaster − This room is played with three teams remaining. Teams work to match various things (capitals to states, movie monsters to how they were defeated, animals to classification, etc.) with extra options. If a set of questions is not completely correct, a blast of cold carbon dioxide hits the team. After solving three of these puzzles, they gain a keypad code that unlocks a box containing wire cutters which must be used to cut the wire and deactivate the Freeze Blaster. The losing team will be "frozen solid." (First appearance: #1 - "Are You Ready to Play?")
- Shredder Room − This room is played with either two or three teams remaining. The teams are in identical confined spaces, kneeling in a corridor. They must answer seven clues from a series of letters to move past a barrier (in the 3-team version it is only 5 clues); the words they must make are three, four, and five letters. A "shredder" advances on them as they complete the puzzles, and the first one or two teams to finish must go through a door to exit safely, while the remaining team is "shredded". (First appearance: #2 - "Don't Shred on Me")
- Mineshaft (Sand Room) − This room is played with two teams remaining. A simple algorithm designates which team goes first in this room as they step into sand. The first team receives a clue as to what person, place or thing is being described and are allowed five seconds to answer. If they get it wrong or fail to provide an answer, they sink deeper into quicksand. The other team gets an additional clue and five seconds to answer. If neither team gives the correct answer after five clues, the answer is revealed and a new clue will be given. A team is eliminated when they are completely submerged in quicksand. (First appearance: #1 - "Are You Ready to Play?")
- Wall Room − This room is played with two teams remaining. Teams are locked to a wall in identical rooms with their faces placed so that they can see a computer monitor. They must then answer five questions about comparisons (older, taller, etc.) against each other. Team members cannot speak to each other, and each partner must answer with the correct answer for the answer to count. After correctly answering five questions, one member of the team is released from the wall and must receive a key to unlock the door as the wall closes in on them. Once this is completed the other team member must retrieve the 2nd key and also leave the room. The first team to complete this wins while the person on the other team who has not retrieved a plasma key is "flattened". (First appearance: #5 - "If These Walls Could Talk")

=== Endgame Rooms ===
- Cabin in the Woods (Ceiling Room) − This was one of the two Final Game Rooms played by the remaining team for the cash prize. The remaining team has ten minutes to complete all parts of the room, which must be done in a specific order and skipping ahead is not allowed, as the ceiling comes down. First, a series of items must be placed in a specific order (like from earliest to most recent). Second, the team must put four logs in a fireplace to answer a question such as "shorter than Tom Cruise" or "younger than Larry King". After getting the set wrong once, they are told a hint, such as Cruise's height or King's age. Third, the teams must put a raccoon cap on "More" or "Less" after being given a statement for which the answer is a number. After answering five of these correctly, they must answer three pop culture questions to win. (First appearance: #1 - "Are You Ready to Play?")
- The Tank (Water Room) − This was one of the two Final Game Rooms played by the remaining team for the cash prize. The remaining team has ten minutes to complete the games which must be done in a specific order and skipping ahead is not allowed as the room fills with water. First, a series of items must be placed in a specific order. Second, the team must look at an underwater grid where words of colors are different colors than the word they are; they are given clues as to what color key they will need to unlock four locks and turn valves. Third, they must turn a lever to "Yes" or "B.S." after being given a statement. After answering five of these correctly, they must answer three pop culture questions to win. (First appearance: #2 - "Don't Shred on Me")

== Episodes ==
No.	Title	Original release date	U.S. viewers (millions)
1	"Are You Ready to Play?"	June 4, 2013	662,000
Beam Room − Dez & Colette eliminated; Freeze Blaster − Jamie & Rebecca eliminated; Mineshaft − Angelo & Elgin eliminated; Final Room: Cabin in the Woods − Chris & Heather exited the room with $10,000.
2	"Don't Shred on Me"	June 11, 2013	812,000
Beam Room − Mike & Jay eliminated; Freeze Blaster − Will & Heather eliminated; Shredder Room − Alex & Priscilla eliminated; Final Room: The Tank − Denene & Sandy failed to exit the room.
3	"That Sinking Feeling"	June 18, 2013	637,000
Beam Room − Janet & Jeanette eliminated; Freeze Blaster − Ben & Seth eliminated; Mineshaft − Jerry & Molly eliminated; Final Room: The Tank − Elisa & Renee exited the room with $10,000.
4	"Sand for Something or Fall for Anything"	June 25, 2013	771,000
Beam Room − Tenokus & Tanisha eliminated; Shredder Room − Angela & Chloe eliminated; Mineshaft − Kyle & Britton eliminated; Final Room: The Tank − Adrienne & Morgan exited the room with $10,000.
5	"If These Walls Could Talk"	July 2, 2013	757,000
Beam Room − Larry & Lynedra eliminated; Shredder Room − Lauren & Samantha eliminated; Wall Room − Keith & Britni eliminated; Final Room: Cabin in the Woods − Connor & Graham exited the room with $10,000.
6	"To Beam or Not to Beam"	July 9, 2013	659,000
Beam Room − Sarah & Carrie eliminated; Shredder Room − Betsy & Wesley eliminated; Wall Room − Natalie & Kristie eliminated; Final Room: Cabin in the Woods − CC & Jessica exited the room with $10,000.

== Reception ==
Melissa Camacho from Common Sense Media claimed that the show was more funny than scary and said anyone looking for a game show with an interesting twist will find it here.
