= Craig Plestis =

American television producer

Craig Plestis is the president and CEO of Smart Dog Media, a reality programming production company. Plestis is an executive producer of The Masked Singer and I Can See Your Voice.

== Career ==
=== NBC ===
Plestis was the executive producer behind the NBC singing game show, The Winner Is hosted by Nick Lachey, in partnership with Talpa Media. Plestis was the creator and executive producer of approximately 70 episodes of the hit game show Minute to Win It, hosted by Guy Fieri, and winner of the International FRAPA Award for Best Studio Based Game Show. He also executive produced NBC's Who's Still Standing?, a game show that featured contestants falling through trap doors after answering trivia questions incorrectly.

As NBC's former Executive Vice President, Alternative Programming, Development and Specials, Craig Plestis oversaw all alternative programming and development for the network, including the hit series Deal or No Deal, The Biggest Loser, America's Got Talent, The Apprentice, The Singing Bee, and 1 vs. 100. His responsibilities also included overseeing NBC's Golden Globe Awards.

=== Smart Dog Media ===
Smart Dog Media created Robot Combat League, the world's first giant fighting robot competition series for the Syfy Channel in 2013. Plestis created and executive produced the series. Craig also served as the executive producer of Syfy's game show Exit, based on a popular Japanese format. He also helped develop and sold the format for Opposite Worlds, Syfy's English-language version of the popular Chilean format, Mundos Opuestos. In 2021 he also developed the television series I Can See Your Voice.

=== Food Network ===
Plestis has also worked extensively with the Food Network. He was the executive producer for Chef Wanted with Anne Burrell, initially launched as Chef Hunter. He was also executive producer for Extreme Chef, which put chefs to the test in challenges in foreign locations, ran for two seasons. Additionally, Craig Plestis was the executive producer on two half-hour syndicated series Unsealed: Alien Files and Unsealed: Conspiracy Files. Smart Dog Media also produced the mechanical challenge competition special, Unscrewed for the History Channel in December 2012, with Craig executive producing.

=== Later projects ===
In March 2021, Plestis began working with Japan's Tokyo Broadcasting System to develop unscripted formats for the U.S. and Global markets. In April 2021, he became executive producer for the new TV series Unicorn Hunters, a business investment show.
