= Skimlinks =

Content monetization platform

- Industry: Marketing, Advertising
- Founded: London, UK (2007)
- Founders: Alicia Navarro, Joe Stepniewski
- Fate: Acquired by Taboola on September 1, 2021
- Headquarters: London
- Products: SkimLinks, Skimlinks Editor Tool, Audiences by Skimlinks
- Services: In-text Advertising and Marketing, Audiences data platform
- Number of employees: 85
- Website: https://skimlinks.com/

Skimlinks is a content monetisation platform for online publishers (including editorial sites, forums, bloggers, social networks, and app developers). It specializes in automatically generating affiliate product links from content creators' commerce content, from which the content creators earn money.

The company was founded in London (2007) by Australian co-founders Alicia Navarro and Joe Stepniewski. It has over 62 employees and has raised $24 million in funding as of August 2013. It has offices in London and New York City. On October 17, 2013, Skimlinks was announced as a member of Tech City UK's Future Fifty Programme, a government program that supports fast-growing companies with to potentially float in the London Stock Exchange. In 2014, Skimlinks drove $625 million in sales for over 20,000 vendors.

== History ==
=== Founding ===
Skimlinks was founded in 2007 by co-founders Alicia Navarro and Joe Stepniewski as a result of a pivot away from the social recommendation tool Skimbit.com. Notably, it is one of the first technology companies headquartered in what is now known as the Silicon Roundabout area in London.

Alicia Navarro created Skimbit.com in 2006 in Australia, but moved to London, England to build her business as she felt it was a much more supportive environment for entrepreneurs. Skimbit was relatively successful and quickly evolved into a white-label social shopping service.

In November 2008, Joe Stepniewski was elected as a co-founder. Together with Navarro, they realised that both users and investors weren't interested in their end product, but in the behind-the-scenes technology, they were using to monetise their site through affiliate marketing. As a result, they pivoted the company into what it is today - a "stand-alone commercial platform to help publishers monetize their editorial and user-generated content."

Alicia Navarro has been featured in several prominent publications, highlighting her role as one of the few female CEOs in the ad-tech world. She was also recently announced as the winner of the Entrepreneur of the Year Award during the 2014 edition of the FDM Everywoman in Technology Awards.

=== Partnership with Pinterest ===
In February 2012, LL Social, an online marketing blog, broke the news that Pinterest was using Skimlinks to monetise content posted by its users. Commercial links included in Pins were being affiliated via Skimlinks. Although the partnership had been ongoing for 2 years, Pinterest had just recently grown exponentially in popularity and the news was badly received.

Most of the backlash arose from the company's failure to disclose its monetisation practices rather than its decision to monetise users' content. Though it was claimed that the revelations prompted Pinterest to drop its affiliation with Skimlinks, Pinterest's CEO, Ben Silbermann, clarified that they had actually been using Skimlinks as an option whilst they explored various monetisation solutions, but had stopped using the service a week before the news broke.

=== Investors ===
Funds have been raised from investors including: The Accelerator Group, Sussex Place Ventures, NESTA, Venrex, BDMI and Greycroft, with advisory board members such as Gokul Rajaram (formerly Head of Product for Google AdSense and Facebook Ads) and Oren Michels (CEO of Mashery). In early 2015, Skimlinks' brought investors from Frog Capital on board as part of their Series C funding round, bringing their total funds raised to $24 million.

=== Acquisitions ===
Skimlinks acquired New York–based competitor, Atma Links, in 2011 to power its SkimWords technology. It then acquired InvisibleHand - a significant player in real-time e-commerce and product pricing - in 2013.

== Products ==
Through relationships with various affiliate networks like Commission Junction, Pepperjam, and Linkshare, Skimlinks aggregates over 24,000 merchant programs which are available to publishers who join the service. To use Skimlinks, prospective users need to apply. Once approved, publishers receive a custom JavaScript snippet to be installed in the footer of their site(s). Users can also install Skimlinks using a WordPress plugin. The snippet will then automatically affiliate applicable URLs in their content. By using Skimlinks, publishers can earn money via commissions on sales, from product links and references in their content to merchants in the Skimlinks network.

Skimlinks is used by 1.5 million domains globally by online publishers like BuzzFeed, Condé Nast, Hearst Digital, WordPress, Time Inc., and Mail Online.

The company has released a variety of tools to which users have access in order to monetised their content. The main ones (as shown on the company's website) are as follows:

- SkimLinks - The company's first product. Released in 2008, it affiliates existing unaffiliated links on a user's site by adding a tracking tag on click.
- SkimWords - The second product in the Skimlinks suite. It went live in 2010 and uses natural language processing technology to link specific phrases like product references and brand names to relevant online retailers.
- The Showcases - They were released in May 2013 and are content-aware visual product displays that rely on technology similar to SkimWords', in order to generate geo-targeted, relevant product suggestions.
- Skimlinks Editor - A Google Chrome extension, it allows users to know what merchants are in the Skimlinks network and how much they pay for referrals. It also has a price-comparison element, allowing users to see alternative purchasing options for the product they are browsing. Lastly, the Editor lets users shorten and monetised URLs straight from their browser. This makes it possible to share monetisable links on sites where Skimlinks isn't live.
- Audiences by Skimlinks - The company's latest product, Audiences by Skimlinks is a 2nd party data co-op that makes the shopping-intent data generated from affiliated content available to marketers for planning, targeting or reporting advertising campaigns.

Skimlinks also offers a series of extras, like the URL shortening of regular links into monetisable links, and SkimRSS which allows users to affiliate links in their RSS feeds.

== See also ==
- Affiliate marketing
- VigLink
- Outbrain
- Taboola
