= AI-generated content in American politics =

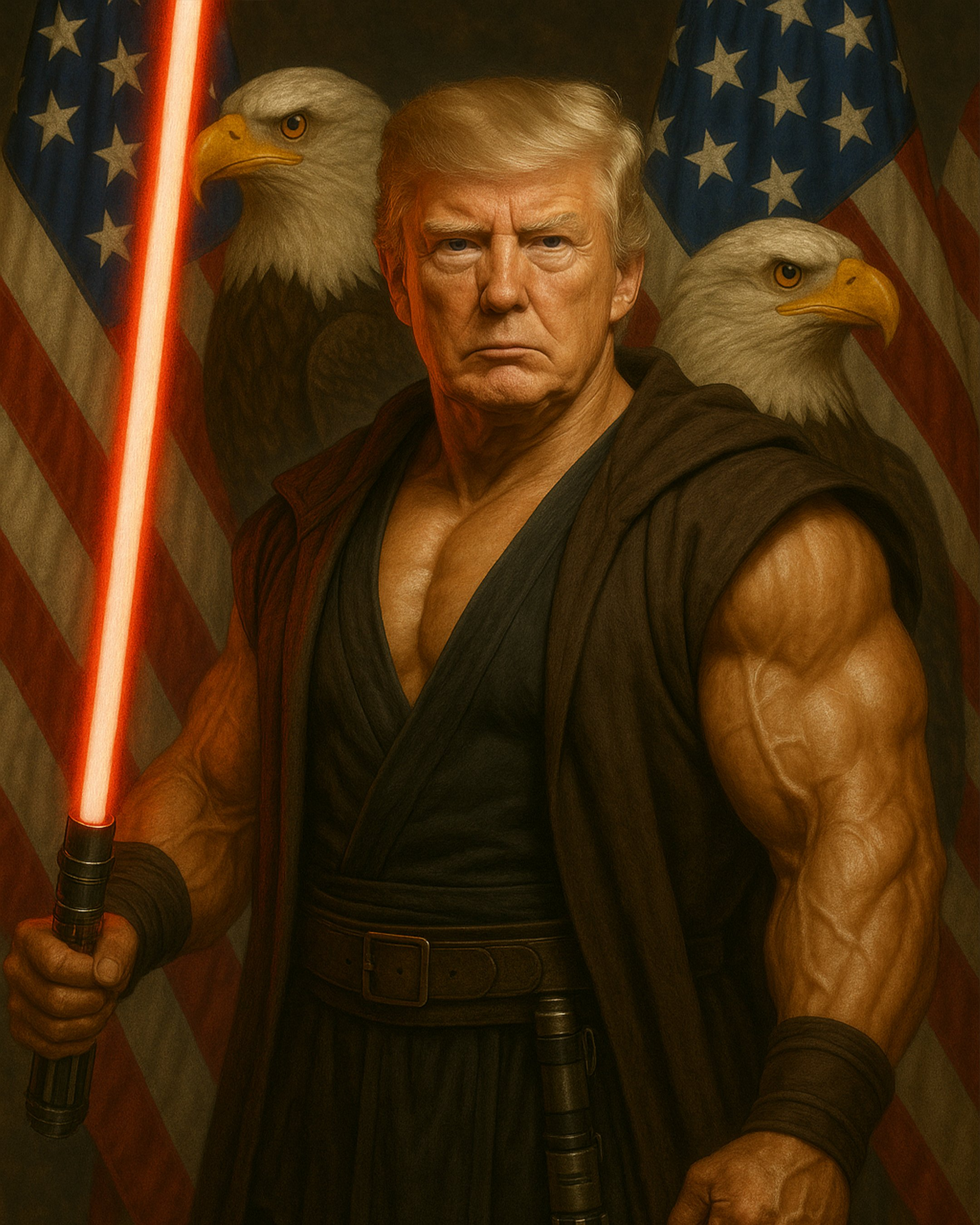
An AI image of Donald Trump posted on the White House's Twitter account in 2025

In American politics since the 2020s, political figures have shared AI-generated images, videos, and audio on social media to attack opponents, create misleading narratives, or inflame emotions. The use of generative AI by American political figures has been subject to criticism from many sides of the political spectrum. President Donald Trump has used generative AI in several Truth Social posts during his second term, many of which have made headlines due to their inflammatory nature.

== Background ==
Generative artificial intelligence is a subfield of artificial intelligence that uses generative models to generate text, images, videos, audio, software code or other forms of data. In the 2020s, with the release of 15.ai, ChatGPT, DALL-E and other generative AI applications, there has been an AI boom.

There has been an increase of usage of generative AI within the United States political field during this time, with both Republican and Democratic party members using it. Several members of the second Trump administration have embraced the use of AI-generated images, causing some misinformation experts to raise concerns about the continued usage would cause the erosion of public perception of the truth. In response to some criticisms, White House deputy communications director Kaelan Dorr posted on X that the "memes will continue" with White House deputy press secretary Abigail Jackson also mocking concerns.

== History of usage ==
=== 2023 ===
In April 2023, the Republican National Committee released an attack ad made entirely with AI-generated images depicting a dystopian future under Joe Biden's re-election.

=== 2024 ===
During the 2024 election cycle, generative AI increased the efficiency of raising money for political candidates by analyzing donor data and identifying possible donors and target audiences.

In March 2024, a Democratic consultant working for Dean Phillips admitted to using AI to generate a robocall that used Joe Biden's voice to discourage voter participation.

In August 2024, The Atlantic noted that low-quality AI-generated content, commonly referred to as "AI slop", was becoming associated with the political right in the United States, who were using it for poor-quality social media posts and engagement farming on social media, with the technology offering "cheap, fast, on-demand fodder for content". In October 2024, it reported that AI slop was being frequently used in political campaigns to gain attention through content farming.

=== 2025 ===
The initial version of the Make Our Children Healthy Again Assessment of children's health issues, released by a commission of cabinet members and officials of the Trump administration, and led by US Department of Health and Human Services Secretary Robert F. Kennedy Jr., reportedly cited nonexistent and garbled references generated using AI.

Democratic governor of California Gavin Newsom repeatedly used AI-generated images to criticize Trump.

In the midst of disruptions to food stamp distribution during the 2025 US government shutdown, anonymous social media users began using OpenAI's Sora to post AI-generated videos of welfare abusers complaining, stealing, and rioting in supermarkets; many comments to the videos appeared unaware that they were AI-generated, or acknowledged that they were AI-generated but nonetheless useful in pushing a narrative of widespread welfare fraud.

On September 6, 2025, Trump shared a post on Truth Social threatening to send the National Guard to Chicago. The post included an AI-generated image with the words "Chipocalypse Now", a reference to the 1979 film Apocalypse Now. The image showed Trump with Chicago behind him with a smoke and fire spread across the background and five US Army helicopters in the sky.

=== 2026 ===
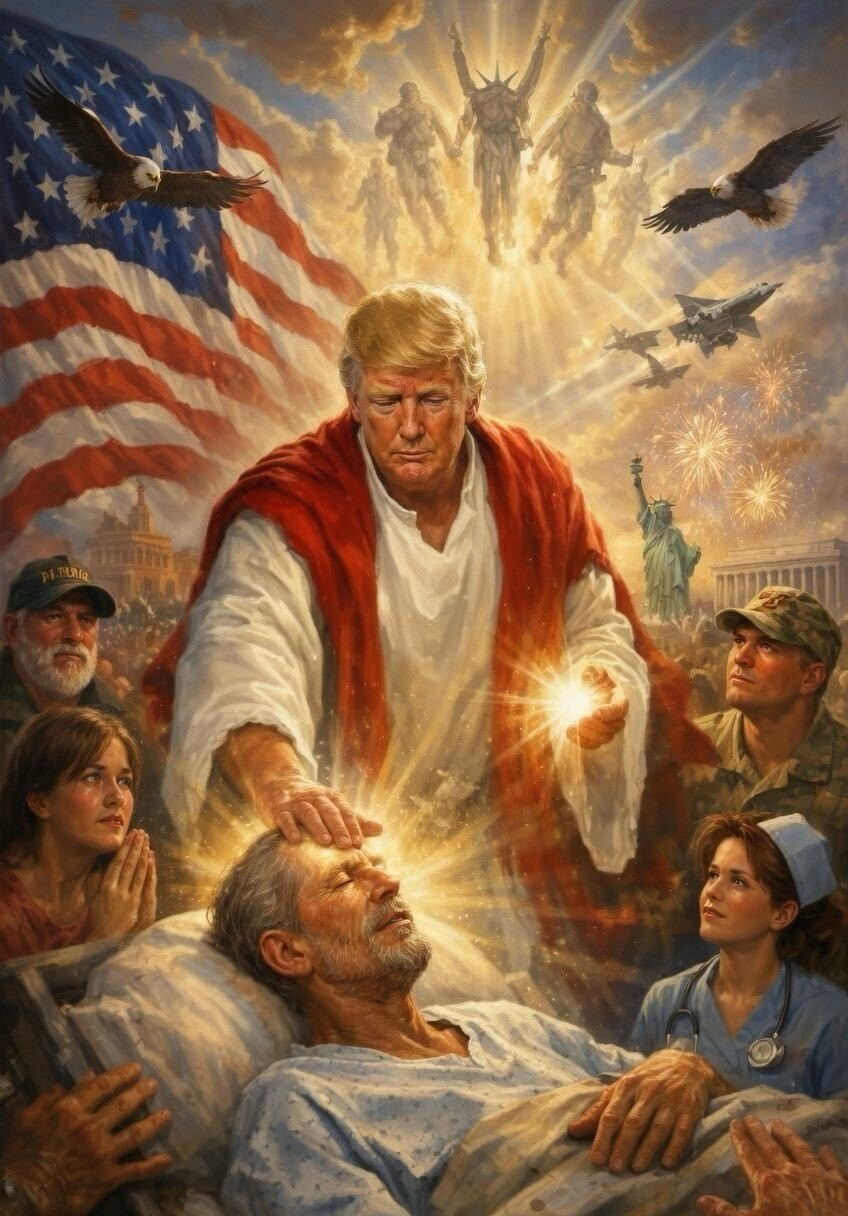
Trump posted this image to his Truth Social account on April 12, 2026. After criticism, the post was quickly deleted.

On February 5, 2026, Donald Trump shared a video on false claims of voter fraud during the 2020 presidential election on Truth Social. The video concluded with a two-second AI-generated clip of Barack and Michelle Obama depicted as apes set to "The Lion Sleeps Tonight". The clip was part of a longer AI-generated video posted in October 2025. The clip received widespread backlash and bipartisan condemnation as racist and was deleted the morning of February 6.

On April 13, 2026 Trump states that he did upload the image and that he thought it depicted him as a doctor.

In April 2026, Trump posted a picture of himself depicted as Jesus, drawing widespread criticism from Evangelicals and Catholics, resulting in Trump deleting the post hours later and claiming he believed he was depicted as a doctor.

Later in April, Wired revealed that a popular pro-MAGA online influencer, Emily Hart, was created through generative AI by a medical student in India looking to make extra money. He said he made a few thousand dollars a month. This followed an earlier disclosure that Jessica Foster, supposedly a young soldier who supported Trump and posted pictures of herself in uniform with him, was also entirely an AI creation.

Over the Labor Day weekend in September 2026, Trump posted multiple AI images and videos on Truth Social, including one depicting New Mexico renamed "New America". The post caused widespread outrage from local historians, politicians, and residents due to the state's tense history with the US and the Trump administration. Other posts included Trump imaging himself as the Green Lantern building a wall to keep out migrants, and in a US hockey uniform threatening a cowering Canadian Prime Minister Mark Carney.

== Examples of use ==
=== Election campaigns ===
In 2023, while he was still running for re-election, the presidential campaign of Joe Biden prepared a task force to respond to AI images and videos. The campaign for the 2024 Republican nominee, Donald Trump, has used deepfake videos of political opponents in campaign ads and fake images showing Trump with black supporters.

During the first five months of his second term in 2025, Trump posted several AI-generated images of himself on official government social media accounts, including him as the Pope, him as a Jedi, and him as a muscular man. In August 2024, Trump posted a series of AI-generated images on his social media platform, Truth Social, that portrayed fans of the singer Taylor Swift in "Swifties for Trump" T-shirts, as well as a photo of the singer herself appearing to endorse Trump's 2024 presidential campaign. The images originated from the conservative Twitter account @amuse, which posted numerous AI slop images leading up to the 2024 United States elections that were shared by other high-profile figures within the US Republican Party, such as Elon Musk, who has publicly endorsed the utilization of generative AI, furthering this association.

In 2024, Michigan GOP candidate Anthony Hudson posted an AI-generated video showing Martin Luther King Jr. endorsing his campaign, later claiming it was uploaded by a volunteer.

In his 2025 bid to be the Democratic nominee for governor of New Jersey, Rep. Josh Gottheimer drew attention and criticism when he released a TV ad that used AI to portray him as a shirtless boxer sparring with Donald Trump in a boxing ring.

In November 2025, the campaign of Mike Collins, a GOP candidate in the 2026 United States Senate election in Georgia released a fake video, generated by artificial intelligence, that depicted Democrat Jon Ossoff defending his vote on the 2025 United States federal government shutdown by declaring he could never say no to Chuck Schumer and that SNAP recipients did not attend his out-of-state fundraisers. The Collins campaign also shared an AI-generated video featuring Collins as a shirtless blue jeans model, referencing an American Eagle Outfitters advertisement featuring Sydney Sweeney.

Video reposted by Spencer Pratt’s campaign (music muted due to copyright)

During the 2026 Los Angeles mayoral election, candidate Spencer Pratt reposted an AI-generated video portraying Pratt as Batman and prominent California politicians such as Karen Bass, Gavin Newsom, and Kamala Harris, as unruly aristocrats. Former governor of Florida Jeb Bush described the ad as “maybe the best political ad of the year.” In response, a spokesperson for Bass's campaign said, he was "doing his best Trump impression." Bass further responded that the AI ads are "taking on a violent trend."

In June 2026, during the United States Senate election in Texas, Citizens for Sanity aired an ad that used AI to generate a deepfake video of Democratic candidate James Talarico. In the video, Talarico is wearing a dress and sings a version of "My Favorite Things" that parodies his support for transgender people with lyrics such as "Boys in white dresses with blue satin sashes / Girls dosed with hormones til they grow mustaches." The ad did not disclose that AI was used in its creation, and it was connected to Ken Paxton and his allies having used Talarico's pro-LGBTQ stances to criticize him throughout the campaign.

=== Protests ===
In response to the nation-wide No Kings protests in October 2025, Donald Trump posted a video depicting himself flying a fighter jet and releasing feces on crowds of demonstrators, including Democratic influencer Harry Sisson.

=== Foreign interference ===
Officials from the ODNI and FBI have stated that Russia, Iran, and China used generative artificial intelligence tools to create fake and divisive text, photos, video, and audio content to foster anti-Americanism and engage in covert influence campaigns. The use of artificial intelligence was described as an accelerant rather than a revolutionary change to influence efforts. Regulation of AI with regard to elections was unlikely to see a resolution for most of the 2024 United States general election season.

=== Disasters and wars ===
In the aftermath of Hurricane Helene in the United States, members of the Republican Party circulated an AI-generated image of a young girl holding a puppy in a flood, and used it as evidence of the failure of President Joe Biden to respond to the disaster. Some, like Trump supporter Amy Kremer, shared the image on social media but acknowledged that it was not genuine.

In February 2025, Donald Trump shared an AI-generated video on Truth Social depicting a hypothetical Gaza after a Trump takeover. The video's creator claimed it was made as political satire.

== Reception ==
Ramesh Srinivasan, a professor at UCLA raised concerns about the use of AI-generative images stating that many people are questioning where they can find trustable information, with AI systems potentially exacerbating and amplifying problems about the absence of trust, and understanding what could be reality. Michael A Spikes, a professor at Northwestern University raised similar concerns, stating that the government sharing these images was eroding trust that the public should hold that the government should disburse accurate, verified information.

Presidential historian and senior fellow at the Ronald Reagan Institute, Tevi Troy, raised claims that the use of AI is the latest adaptation by a sitting president, such as the use of the radio by Franklin Roosevelt and the TV by John F. Kennedy. John Nosta, an AI theorist shared similar opinions linking generative-AI usage to it being the evolution of Photoshop, but raised concerns that it could stray easily from augmenting communication to manipulating communication.

== Regulation ==
Several states have made attempts to regulate or restrict the usage of A.I. generated media in relation to political campaigns.

In 2019, California passed a bill which prohibits the distribution of malicious deepfake audio or visual media targeting a candidate running for public office within 60 days of their election. The legislation was expanded in 2024 to prohibit content which "pose[d] a clear and present risk to our elections and our democracy." The expanded regulations were challeged and struck down by Eastern District of California in the case Kohls v. Bonta. The legislation was then amended in 2026 and now requires the disclosure of A.I generated content within the advertisment itself and requires platforms to remove deceptive content in the period of 120 days prior to an election.

Texas passed a law in 2019 which prohibited the publication of deepfake videos within 30 days of an election. In 2025, legislation was introduced which would require disclosure by candidates or political committees who used A.I altered or generated media in their political advertisements. The legislation stalled following concerns that the state was policing political satire and memes. During the 2026 Texas lieutenant gubernatorial election, Democratic candidate Vikki Goodwin filed a police report accusing her opponent Republican Dan Patrick of violating the 2019 prohibition law. Patrick denied any wrongdoing, but the adverts were removed.

== See also ==
- Artificial intelligence and elections
- Artificial intelligence in government
- Artificial intelligence industry in the United States
- Deepfake
- Misinformation about the 2024 Atlantic hurricane season § AI-generated images
- Propaganda in the United States
- Regulation of artificial intelligence in the United States
- Slopaganda
- Use of copyrighted works by the second Trump administration
