= Use of copyrighted works by the second Trump administration =

Under the second presidency of Donald Trump beginning in January 2025, the United States federal government has come under controversy for its unauthorized use of copyrighted works such as music, film, and video game assets in social media content promoting the administration's policies and actions, including its immigration policy and the 2026 Iran war. Many of these images and videos have been posted to the White House and the Department of Homeland Security's social media accounts as well as to Trump's personal account on Truth Social.

Several of the involved authors, performers, and copyright owners have publicly condemned the use of their works in the administration's social media content, with some videos being taken down or muted due to copyright claims. Lee Mendelson Film Productions brought a lawsuit on May 20, 2026, alleging that the U.S. Department of the Interior used a musical arrangement from the soundtrack for A Charlie Brown Christmas in a series of social media posts without its authorization. Under Title 28 of the United States Code, the available remedies in a copyright infringement lawsuit against the federal government are limited to monetary damages, and the court cannot issue an injunction to prevent further infringement. Some commentators have also suggested that the government may be able to claim fair use.

== Historical and political context ==
=== Government mass media campaign ===
Starting in early 2025, the Trump administration began a mass media campaign to publicize its aggressive immigration enforcement operations. The campaign has included "ironic" memes and graphic images of alleged illegal migrants being arrested and deported, such as an AI-generated image in the art style of Studio Ghibli's animated films portraying a Dominican woman crying while being apprehended by immigration officers. The image was widely criticized for dehumanizing and mocking the suffering of migrants in ICE custody, and the Ghibli AI art trend has been contextualized as part of a broader ethical controversy about generative AI's potential impact on artists and use of copyrighted content. Professor Roland Meyer has commented that "trolling" is a central part of the Trump administration's social media strategy.

=== Trump's past conflicts with copyright owners ===
Prior to his re-election in 2024, Donald Trump drew criticism from multiple musicians and their estates for the unauthorized use of copyrighted music in connection with his presidential campaigns. Some musicians have sued the Trump campaign for copyright infringement, including Neil Young and Eddy Grant; others have responded with cease and desist letters or public statements criticizing the campaign.

Trump's campaign has also had videos removed by social media platforms due to complaints from other copyright owners. On June 3, 2020, Trump's reelection campaign posted a video criticizing "rioters, looters and anarchists" in the George Floyd protests, which included several images and video clips. The video was subsequently removed by Twitter, Instagram, and Facebook due to DMCA takedown requests; Twitter confirmed that the complaint was related to one of the images used in the campaign video but did not identify the copyright holder who had sent it. Trump claimed that Twitter was siding with "Radical Left Democrats" and called its removal of the video "illegal." A spokesperson for the Trump campaign criticized the apparent double standard imposed on the Trump campaign versus other Twitter users and said: "This incident is yet another reminder that Twitter is making up the rules as they go along."

== Legal background ==
Under United States copyright law, copyright owners have exclusive rights to carry out or authorize certain activities with respect to copyrighted works. For musical compositions and sound recordings, these include incorporating the work into a motion picture (synchronization rights) and "performing" the work publicly via transmission over the Internet. It is customary for organizations seeking to use copyrighted music in motion pictures such as video advertisements to obtain a synchronization license.

Violating any of these exclusive rights is considered copyright infringement, and the legal or beneficial owner of an exclusive right can seek a variety of remedies under federal law, including damages and injunctions to stop the infringement. Thus, for example, a recording artist who has transferred their copyrights to a record label in exchange for royalties could sue an infringer, even though the artist has "parted with legal title" to the copyrights in question. The federal government can be sued for copyright infringement, since Congress has waived sovereign immunity against such claims. However, under 28 U.S.C. § 1498(b), a copyright lawsuit against the U.S. government must be brought in the United States Court of Federal Claims, and the available remedies are limited to the copyright owner's "reasonable and entire compensation as damages for such infringement, including the minimum statutory damages." This means that the court cannot grant an injunction against the government to stop the infringement.

Fair use is a legal defense to a copyright infringement claim that generally allows limited portions of a copyrighted work to be used for purposes such as criticism, commentary, news reporting, education, or parody, even without the permission of the copyright owner. The evaluation of fair use is fact-specific and depends on a number of factors, such as "the purpose and character of the use, including whether such use is of a commercial nature or is for non-profit educational purposes". Writing for Reason magazine, Autumn Billings explains that the DHS's use of copyrighted material in promotional videos may be considered "commercial", which weighs against a finding of fair use. In contrast, copyright expert Cynthia Katz speculated that if the agency were not "espousing a specific policy action," it may be able to argue that its use is non-commercial.

== Incidents ==
=== Musicians ===
On March 17, 2025, the White House and U.S. Border Patrol Instagram accounts posted a video supporting the Trump administration's deportation of illegal immigrants. The video used the Semisonic song "Closing Time" as background music without authorization and included the caption "You don't have to go home but you can't stay here." Semisonic objected to this use, stating: "We did not authorize or condone the White House's use of our song in any way. And no, they didn't ask. The song is about joy and possibilities and hope, and they have missed the point entirely."

A video posted to the DHS Instagram page on June 13 featured the song "I Won't Back Down" by late American rock musician Tom Petty. Petty's estate objected in an emailed statement: "The use of the song in connection with the Dept of Homeland security is completely unauthorized.... Cease and desist legal orders will be issued to stop this abuse of Tom's song." By June 14, the audio on the Instagram video had been disabled.

Another video, uploaded to the DHS and Customs and Border Protection Instagram accounts in July, combined footage of DHS secretary Kristi Noem accompanying CBP agents with Black Rebel Motorcycle Club's cover version of "God's Gonna Cut You Down", a traditional American folk song. On July 10, the band issued public statements on Instagram and Twitter demanding that DHS cease and desist using their cover recording, writing: "It's obvious that you don't respect Copyright Law and Artist Rights any more than you respect Habeas Corpus and Due Process rights," and adding "go [fuck] yourselves."

On July 29, the White House posted a video on its official Twitter account superimposing audio from a Jet2holidays commercial over footage of alleged undocumented immigrants in handcuffs being escorted onto an airplane by ICE officers. The advertisement, which uses the song "Hold My Hand" by English singer-songwriter Jess Glynne and voiceover by actress Zoë Lister, had become parodied in an Internet meme. Jet2, Glynne, and Lister issued statements condemning the White House's use of the advertisement audio.

On July 30, the Department of Homeland Security's Twitter account posted a video using Sam Hunt's rendition of the song "This Land Is Your Land" by Woody Guthrie, with the caption "The Promise of America is worth Protecting. The Future of our Homeland is worth Defending." In a statement to ABC News, Guthrie's estate criticized DHS's use of the song, saying that "it looks like we'll all have to sing 'This Land Is Your Land' right back at 'em, so they can re-learn it and get it right." The song is in the public domain in the United States, as the copyright was not renewed until after its initial 28-year copyright term expired. However, Guthrie's heirs have sought to keep it under copyright control in order to prevent actors like Trump and the Ku Klux Klan from using it in ways that would have conflicted with Guthrie's wishes.

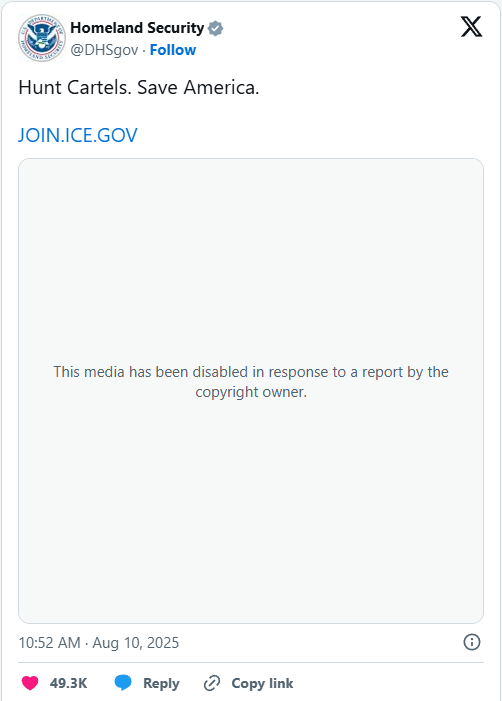
The deleted ICE recruitment video featuring the Jay-Z song "Public Service Announcement"

On August 10, an ICE recruitment video was posted to DHS's Twitter, Instagram, and Facebook pages using Jay-Z's song "Public Service Announcement" with the caption "Hunt Cartels. Save America." The video has been removed from the Twitter post, which now displays the text, "This media has been disabled in response to a report by the copyright owner," while the audio has been muted on the Facebook and Instagram versions.

Trump's AI-generated video on Truth Social. The original version features the song "Danger Zone"; the audio in this version has been muted.

On October 18, Donald Trump shared an AI-generated video depicting himself in a fighter jet marked "King Trump", dropping brown liquid resembling feces on crowds of protesters in the No Kings demonstrations, on his Truth Social account. The video was set to the recording of "Danger Zone" by Kenny Loggins, apparently referencing the film Top Gun; it had been created by another user and then reposted by Trump. Loggins asked Trump to remove his song from the video and told a reporter, "I can't imagine why anybody would want their music used or associated with something created with the sole purpose of dividing us."

On November 4, the White House and DHS Instagram accounts jointly published a video that showed ICE officers detaining and deporting undocumented immigrants and encouraged self-deportation via the CBP Home app as an alternative, playing the song "All-American Bitch" by Olivia Rodrigo in the background. Rodrigo, who had criticized the administration's raids in Los Angeles amid a series of anti-ICE protests in June, wrote "don't ever use my songs to promote your racist, hateful propaganda" in a comment on the post. By November 8, Instagram had muted the audio. In response, a DHS spokesperson issued the statement: "America is grateful all the time for our federal law enforcement officers who keep us safe. We suggest Ms. Rodrigo thank them for their service, not belittle their sacrifice."

On December 2, the White House posted a video edited to Sabrina Carpenter's song "Juno", with the lyric "Have you ever tried this one?" (originally referencing sex positions) repeated over various shots of United States Immigration and Customs Enforcement agents carrying out arrests of suspected illegal immigrants. Carpenter responded, "This video is evil and disgusting. Do not ever involve me or my music to benefit your inhumane agenda." The White House responded on December 5 by posting an edited version of a Saturday Night Live promotion featuring Carpenter and cast member Marcello Hernández. The video was overdubbed so that Carpenter appears to say, "I think I might need to arrest someone for being too illegal," instead of "...being too hot"—referring to Hernández, who is Latino—and spliced together with footage of ICE arrests. The White House's video response has been referred to as "trolling" and "doubling down". A spokesperson for the White House also responded: "Here's a Short n' Sweet message for Sabrina Carpenter: We won't apologize for deporting dangerous criminal illegal murderers, rapists, and pedophiles from our country."

On December 8, the White House uploaded a holiday-themed, pro-ICE video that featured a remixed version of the song "Big Boys" by SZA, which originated from a December 2022 SNL sketch under the same name. While the song alludes to the concept of cuffing season, the video relates the message to arresting immigrants in handcuffs. SZA accused the video of being "rage bait" to receive free promotion for an agenda that was "inhuman" and "evil". SZA's former manager, Terrence "Punch" Henderson, similarly concluded that "trying to provoke artist to respond in order to help spread propaganda and political agendas is nasty business. Knock it off."

In February 2026, English rock band Radiohead released a statement that condemned the use of their song "Let Down" in a video posted by ICE, stating, "We demand that the amateurs in control of the ICE social media account take it down. It ain't funny, this song means a lot to us and other people, and you don't get to appropriate it without a fight. Also, go fuck yourselves."

On April 16, 2026, German synth-pop band Alphaville issued a statement on their Instagram profile condemning Donald Trump's use of their song "Forever Young" in an AI-generated video on his Truth Social profile. The statement, posted in English and German and signed by bandleader Marian Gold, said that Alphaville "largely abhor" Trump's political views and would "ensure that this post is removed from the internet immediately."

In June 2026, the administration posted a video of border patrol agents placing people in handcuffs set to the Ariana Grande song "Bye". Grande condemned the post and removed its audio. In July 2026, the administration posted a video of military strikes set to the Katy Perry song "Firework". The post was condemned by Perry. A July 2026 post by the White House of Trump touring a General Motors plant in Michigan set to the Noah Kahan song "American Cars" was condemned by Kahan. In August 2026, the administration posted a video set to the Ariana Grande song "We Can't Be Friends (Wait for Your Love)" with text stating "Men can't have babies and should never compete in women's sports". Grande condemned the post, writing "Never use my music again. Also, your truth is false."

In September 2026, the administration aired a number of government-funded television advertisements featuring the song "Love Me" by singer JMSN. JMSN condemned the advertisements and issued a cease-and-desist order. In September 2026, the administration posted a video depicting immigration raids set to the Zara Larsson song "Midnight Sun" with the caption "never ending deportations", referencing the lyric "never-ending midnight sun". Larsson condemned the post. In October 2026, the administration posted a video set to the PlaqueBoyMax and UnoTheActivist song "Man of the Year"; the post was condemned by PlaqueBoyMax.

=== Video games ===
On October 26, 2025, the White House quote tweeted a post by GameStop, adding an AI-generated image of Donald Trump dressed as Master Chief from the Halo video game franchise with the caption "Power to the Players". The next day, the DHS posted another Halo-themed image superimposed by the text "Destroy the Flood" (referencing the fictional parasitic alien species in the Halo games) and the domain name join.ice.gov. As of October 28, Microsoft, the owner of the Halo franchise, has not commented publicly on the government's social media posts.

On March 5, 2026, the White House posted an image based on the cover art of the video game Pokémon Pokopia, with the logo edited to say "Make America Great Again", on its Twitter account. The image was based on a meme generator released by PixelFrame that enables users to create spoofs of the Pokopia logo in the logo's font. The Pokémon Company responded to this image, with a spokesperson saying "We were not involved in its creation or distribution, and no permission was granted for the use of our intellectual property. Our mission is to bring the world together, and that mission is not affiliated with any political viewpoint or agenda."

On March 12, 2026, the White House posted a video titled "Undefeated", featuring footage of U.S. drone strikes in Iran during the 2026 Iran war spliced between a gameplay video of Wii Sports. The footage of strikes appears when the player character is about to score a hit, with various graphics from Wii Sports being superimposed onto the footage, such as the "hole in one" banner, while featuring music and sound effects from the game. The upbeat nature of the game being mixed with real military footage was condemned by various internet users, with one unknown user stating "War is not a videogame."

On March 27, 2026, the official White House X account posted an AI-generated short video depicting Trump declaring "Make Farming Great Again!" before running out of his office and into a setting akin to that of Animal Crossing.

On September 9, 2026, following the announcement of the video game The Legend of Zelda: Ocarina of Time, the White House posted a spoof titled The Legend of Trump: Make America Great Again.

==== arcade.gov ====
On September 3, 2026, the White House announced Arcade.gov, a webpage of retro-style browser games promoting the Trump administration's policies, with one of them being Build the Wall, a Tetris-style game in which the player builds the Mexico-United States border wall to stop "the coming horde". The promotional video parodies the Sega production logo with "MAGA" and plays the Green Hill Zone theme from Sonic the Hedgehog (1991) as accompanying music. Other promotional videos parody video game console start-up screens such as those of GameCube and Xbox 360.

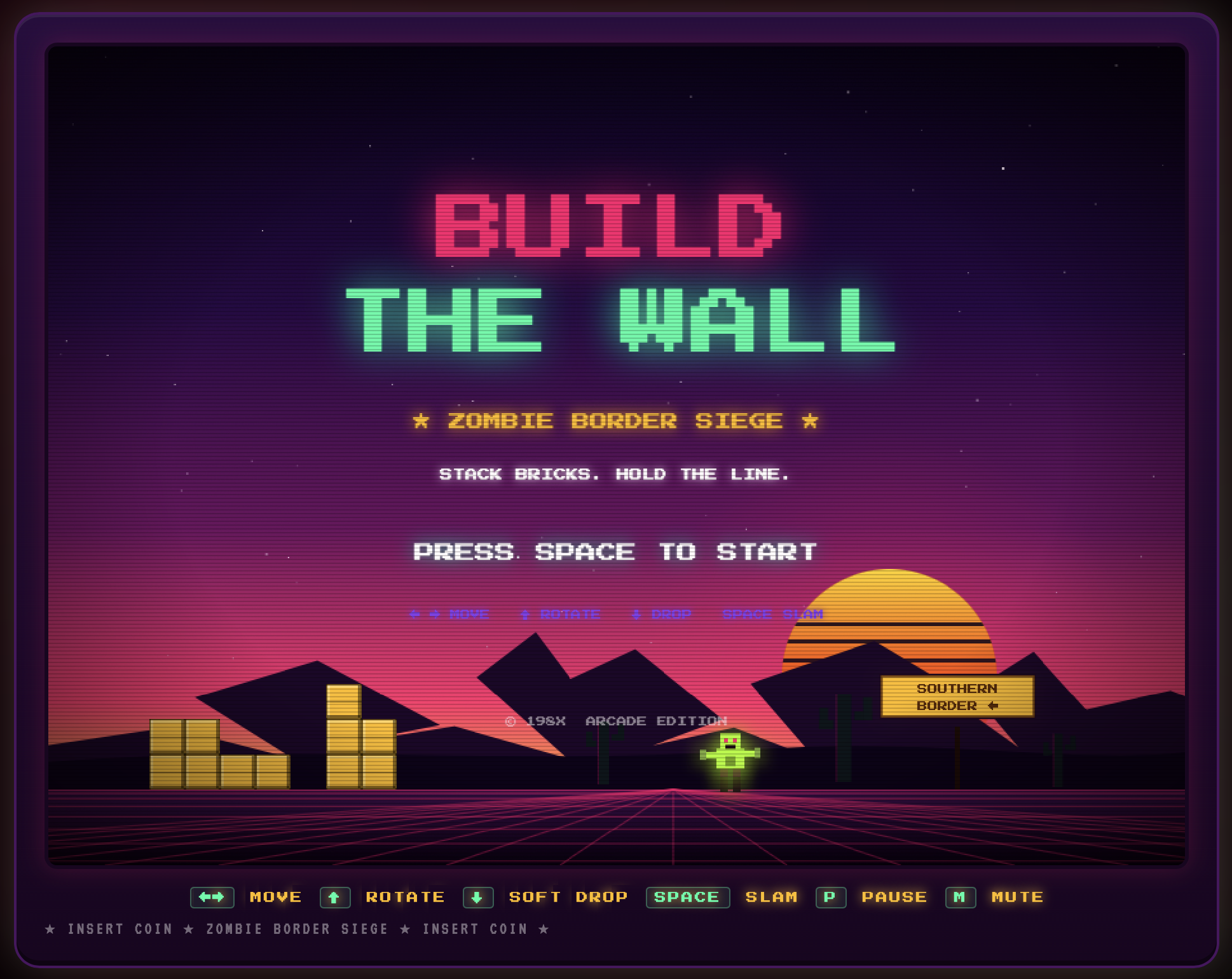
The Arcade.gov web game Build the Wall

The Sega parody logo featured in the Arcade.gov video announcement

The Tetris Company posted an official statement on social media, stating that they "take copyright infringement very seriously" and "believe in the power of connection and bringing people together, not dividing them". Sega declined a request for comment by Japanese news outlet ITMedia News. Build the Wall was removed on September 8.

=== Television ===
On September 22, 2025, the DHS released a video montage that combined clips from the Pokémon animated series showing protagonist Ash Ketchum throwing Poké Balls with footage of alleged illegal immigrants being arrested by ICE officers. The video uses the "Pokémon Theme" in the background and ends with a series of mock Pokémon cards featuring images of some of the arrested individuals. It was also posted by the official White House TikTok account. Two days later, The Pokémon Company International released a statement in response to the videos, noting that "permission was not granted for the use of our intellectual property."

On May 20, 2026, Lee Mendelson Film Productions (LMFP) sued the United States government in the Court of Federal Claims, alleging that the Department of the Interior used Vince Guaraldi's arrangement of "O Tannenbaum" from A Charlie Brown Christmas in holiday greeting cards on social media without its permission. The animated greeting cards were posted to X, Instagram, and Facebook on Christmas Eve 2025, and were removed from those platforms between January 12 and 13, 2026. As a production company and music publisher, LMFP holds the copyrights to many of Guaraldi's compositions from the Peanuts television franchise.

On August 24, 2026, The White House Instagram Page posted a parody of The Magic School Bus writing "The Magic Deportation Bus" with captions indicating that the beloved character of Ms. Frizzle will be deporting illegal immigrants.

On September 27, 2026, the Department of Homeland Security posted a video composed of highlights of NFL football player Brian Dawkins, quoting another X post that reported on a "huge migrant caravan headed towards the US southern border". Dawkins stated that he had not given anyone permission to use his name, image, and likeness; the NFL asked the DHS to remove the video.

=== Visual artists ===
- Morning Pledge, painting by Thomas Kinkade
- A Prayer for a New Life, painting by Morgan Weistling
- Untitled (Beachcomber Series), painting by Hiroshi Nagai (Note: The painting is identified in a Community Note on the X post and at the linked web page on an auction website.)

=== Miscellaneous works ===
On September 23, 2025, the DHS used a clip of comedian Theo Von saying, "Heard you got deported, dude—bye!" in a 31-second video on Twitter touting the Trump administration's deportation statistics. In a quote tweet, Von asked the DHS to remove the video, writing: "Yooo DHS i didnt approve to be used in this." The DHS video had been taken down as of Wednesday, September 24.

On November 3, the news website Axios reported that an attorney for the Chicago Sun-Times had asked the Department of Homeland Security to stop using three of its photographs in the department's social media posts. Concerned about the independence and credibility of its reporting on government agencies, the Sun-Times alleged that the DHS's unauthorized use of its photos created a "false implication" that the newspaper had given the department permission to use them.

== Reactions and commentary ==
Several commentators have described the Trump administration's unauthorized use of copyrighted material on social media as copyright infringement. In an article for the libertarian magazine Reason, Autumn Billings wrote that the Trump administration has little incentive to abide by copyright laws, as copyright owners' remedies for infringements by the federal government are limited to lost profits and statutory damages (see § Legal background for further discussion). Billings called the government's disregard for copyrights "ironic" considering its emphasis on "restoring the rule of law to the immigration system." Joe Patrice, a senior editor at legal news website Above the Law, compared the DHS's pattern of copyright violations to its disregard of due process in immigration enforcement.

== See also ==
- Legal affairs of the second Trump presidency
- Deportation in the second Trump administration § Media campaign
- United States Immigration and Customs Enforcement § Publicity campaign
- United States Department of Homeland Security
- Social media use by Donald Trump
- Musicians who oppose Donald Trump's use of their music
- AI-generated content in American politics
