= Reelkandi =

Video-on-demand television channel

Reelkandi Limited
- Trade name: Reelkandi
- Type: Private
- Industry: Entertainment
- Genre: Fashion; Showbiz; Film; Music; Beauty; Lifestyle; Theatre
- Founded: London, United Kingdom (June 1, 2009)
- Founders: Earl Carpenter
- Fate: Subject of a proposal to strike off
- Headquarters: London, UK
- Number of locations: 1 Head Office
- Area served: UK; US; Germany; Netherlands
- Products: Afternoon Tease; The New Millionaire
- Services: Video production; Publishing; Native advertising
- Website: www.reelkandi.com

Reelkandi was an online entertainment and lifestyle video-on-demand television channel, based in London, United Kingdom. Reelkandi produce original format features it creates, along with covering major entertainment events that take place in the United States and United Kingdom, for viewers to watch online.

Reelkandi was founded by Earl Carpenter, a West End theatre stage actor who played the lead role in The Phantom of the Opera and who in August 2014 featured in the Broadway version of Les Misérables.

Incorporated as a registered company in the United Kingdom in 2012, Reelkandi was one of the first online female Television channels to introduce the concept of immersing consumer product sponsored narratives into its video content, which is more commonly known as native advertising. Reelkandi used native advertising as an alternative to display advertising and video advertising around its features, by showing brand messages within the framework of the programs themselves.

== History ==
Starting as a London-based independently owned online television channel, Reelkandi launched by filming theatre events in 2009, covering productions on Broadway, New York and the West End, London. By 2010, coverage expanded to encompass wider entertainment topics, from Red Carpet Award Ceremonies and Film Premiere's to Music Festivals.

In 2010, the Laurence Olivier Awards was streamed live on the internet for the first time by Reelkandi, reaching a live audience of over 113,000 viewers who watched the event for the first time since it was first launched in 1976. Reelkandi repeated its live coverage the following year in 2011, before the event switched coverage to the BBC in 2012 for Television broadcast and ITV in 2013.

By early 2011, Reelkandi program schedule had extended to producing original program formats created by the channel, such as Afternoon Tease as weekly episodic features, at a time when YouTube, one of the world's largest websites for videos, only just began to fund original programming also.

Further expansion in the program schedule took place in late 2011 to incorporate the female lifestyle genre, producing an offshoot channel titled The New Millionaire Channel.

== Establishing native advertising ==
Reelkandi became one of the first female online Television channels to introduce native advertising into its video features in 2011, by combining Advertorial and branded content disciplines into its editorial style, weaving consumer brand messages and editorials into the contextual story lines of the editorial video features, working with various consumer brands such as Procter & Gamble.

The online Television channel attained a global reach of around 70 million internet video views a month by 2012, where by March 2014, according to comScore, video views in the United States alone, reached 47 billion views across thousands of online publishers, where the top 10 publishers video views ranged from 164 million to 11 billion views in a month.

By 2013, Reelkandi had established its practice of native advertising, at a time when online publishers were beginning to venture into the practice as an alternative to traditional advertising for the first time. For Reelkandi, key consumer brand partnership were established to carry out native advertising campaigns, working with brands like Procter and Gamble. In the case of the Gillette Venus brand, Reelkandi produced a themed series of video features diarising the journeys taken by fashion graduates entering into the Fashion Industry for their first time. The episodic feature which included the coverage of London Fashion Week February 2014 was shown across social media channels, traditional female journals, online publications, and video channels.
