= VigLink =

Traffic monetization service

- Industry: Marketing, Advertising
- Founded: San Francisco, USA (March 2009)
- Founder: Oliver Roup, CEO
- Headquarters: San Francisco
- Products: VigLink Convert, VigLink Insert, VigLink Anywhere
- Services: In-text Advertising and Marketing

VigLink is a San Francisco-based, outbound-traffic monetization service for publishers, forums, and bloggers. VigLink specializes in in-text advertising and marketing. VigLink CEO Oliver Roup founded the company in March 2009.

In 2012, Oliver Roup reported VigLink was working on 5 billion pages per month.

As of November 2014, VigLink has raised $27.34 million and is working with 63,000 online retailers including eBay, Target, Amazon.com, and Wal-Mart.

== Service ==
VigLink's content monetization solution connects potential consumers to products by hyperlinking particular keywords in a website's content.

The company's technology, VigLink Insert, scans a page for words that could be potentially profitable to the publisher of the page, and connects the keyword with a product from an affiliate program. The publisher is paid when a reader clicks a link contained in the content to buy or learn more about a service or product.

VigLink also offers an outbound analytics service for clients to understand where readers go when they leave their site.

== Products ==
VigLink's first service, called VigLink Convert, operates using a JavaScript library that customers install on their web site to identify and monetize all potential links to any of the 30,000 merchants working with VigLink.

The company also offers an NLP-powered link-insertion solution, VigLink Insert, to automatically insert links into a publisher's content without detracting from reader experience.

VigLink Anywhere is the startup's newest product. The Anywhere service is geared towards social media, allowing users to monetize links shared on Facebook, Twitter, and other channels.

== History ==
=== Founding and early investors ===
Oliver Roup founded VigLink in 2009, after discovering that less than 50% of links to Amazon.com on the web were engaged in the affiliate program. The VigLink product was in market by January 2010.

The same month the product was released in market, VigLink received $800,000 in seed funding from First Round Capital and Google Ventures. Other investors included LinkedIn founder Reid Hoffman and VP for Products at LinkedIn, Deep Nishar.

=== Acquisitions and technological developments ===
In August 2010, VigLink announced it had acquired competitor company DrivingRevenue.com. The cofounder of DrivingRevenue, Raymond Lyle, became the president of VigLink. The acquisition brought over $100 million in transactions from merchandise to the company.

The startup closed a Series B funding round in March 2011. The $5.4 million round was led by Emergence Capital, with continued funding from Google Ventures and First Round Capital. Emergence Capital partner Kevin Spain also became a member of the VigLink board.

In November 2011, VigLink debuted the new LinkWeaver service. The new technology functioned to enhance VigLink's automated link affiliation by detecting merchant and product references within a website's content and linking them to relevant merchant pages. Contrary to alternative in-text methods, the LinkWeaver solution was designed to seek out direct merchant and product references and to avoid hyperlinking keywords to products unrelated to the website's content. In April, 2013, the company renamed its LinkWeaver product to VigLink Insert.

On June 12, 2012, the company announced it had integrated with vBulletin, granting VigLink access to 100,000 forum websites. VigLink also reported that it was processing over 500 million clicks every month.

The following October, VigLink announced a new partnership with iTunes and iOS App Store link optimization service, GeoRiot.

In May 2013, blog advertising company Skyscraper announced its partnership with VigLink.

In June, VigLink unveiled a new link optimization solution as an optional upgrade to the VigLink Convert service. The update modified the original URL, redirecting users to a higher profit-margin retailer.

Reddit announced that they would begin using VigLink to redirect affiliate links in June, 2016. In February 2017, VigLink partnered with MSN to monetize its online content.

In October 2019, Norton Safe Web blocked traffic redirected via Viglink and reported that the site contained identity threats.

== See also ==
- Outbrain
- Skimlinks
- Taboola
