= Afternoon Tease =

Online television program

Afternoon Tease is an online television program, launched in 2011 as an episodic series by Reelkandi, the program's creator and online television channel, based in London. In 2014, Afternoon Tease is still broadcasting online in the United Kingdom.

Its program format provides for viewers to watch the featured actors in the show, from a fly on the wall perspective, interacting via social media with the presenters during the show. The show centres on a format of four women discussing various entertainment and lifestyle topics, where filming takes place in and around various leisure and lifestyle locations across London.

== History ==
In 2011, Reelkandi launched the production of an online television series entitled Afternoon Tease. The title and format was borrowed from the tradition of women taking afternoon tea, with a play on words forming the title of the format.

The format of the program devised by Reelkandi centred on four female friends who regularly meet in popular London dining locations, where the novel series was filmed and made available on the internet, across multiple publisher websites.

The first series produced by Reelkandi was first presented by Zoe Hardman, the television presenter for Take Me Out: The Gossip on ITV2. The show also initially featured Sarah-Jane Crawford, who in 2014 is a presenter in the Xtra Factor, the spin-off programme of The X Factor. While the presenters were briefed on topics to be discussed on camera, the show was largely ad lib in terms of the spoken dialogue during the segments, which gave the show an informal rather than a rehearsed format of other reality television shows of the day, in its genre.

== Native advertising within the show ==
The shows format was developed by Reelkandi to incorporate advertiser sponsorship, with consumer products being openly discussed within the ad lib dialogue framework, though contextually relevant to the overall subject matter. By 2013, this particular form of advertising sponsorship would be identified as Native advertising as defined by online Industry organisations such as the Internet Advertising Bureau referenced by the Internet Advertising Bureau (IAB) as Native advertising. One of the first sponsors of the episodic series was the Swisshotel Group part of the FRHI Hotels & Resorts group which includes the Fairmont Hotel Group.

Afternoon Tease interlaced social media within video on demand production, by linking the Reelkandi shows presenters to dedicated Twitter and Facebook accounts, where the viewers could comment and interact with the presenters on these social media platforms as they watched the programs in an online environment, sharing website links to advertising brands featured within the show

Further franchises of the show were planned by Reelkandi with a focus on entertainment and lifestyle topics, including a music-only version and a fashion-only version, with the show planning to extend its format to other countries including the United States, Germany and the Netherlands, though this has yet to be officially announced by the company
