= Chum bucket =

Chum bucket, (The) Chum Bucket, or chumbucket can mean:

- A bucket used to hold "chum" in the practice of chumming
- The Chum Bucket, the fictional, unsuccessful restaurant run by Plankton and Karen in SpongeBob SquarePants
- A chumbox, a form of online advertising
