= Outbrain =

American web advertising platform

Outbrain Inc.
- Type: Public
- Traded as: Nasdaq: TEAD
- Industry: Internet
- Founded: 2006; 20 years ago
- Founders: Yaron Galai; Ori Lahav
- Headquarters: New York City, New York, U.S.
- Key people: Yaron Galai, David Kostman, CO-CEO
- Products: Content Discovery Platform
- Revenue: ▲US$1.30 billion (2025)
- Net income: ▼ −US$517 million (2025)
- Number of employees: 850
- Website: www.outbrain.com

Outbrain is a web recommendation platform founded in 2006 by co-founder and Co-CEO Yaron Galai and co-founder, Chief Technology Officer and General Manager, Ori Lahav. The company is headquartered in New York City.

In February 2024, Yaron Galai resigned.

The company generates revenue for online publishers by displaying feeds of content and ads, or boxes of links, known as chumboxes, to pages within a website or mobile platform. Advertisers pay Outbrain on a pay-per-click basis and a portion of that revenue is shared with publishers.

The quality of Outbrain's recommendations has been debated.

== Products ==
Outbrain is a native advertising company. It uses targeted advertising to recommend articles, slideshows, blog posts, photos or videos to a reader. Some of the content recommended by Outbrain link to publisher's own content, while others link to other sites.

As of March 2019, Outbrain's promoted articles are found on 108,121 websites. In 2020, Outbrain delivered an average of 10 billion recommendations daily for over 20,000 advertisers.

== History ==
Outbrain first marketed its content discovery platform in 2006.

It was founded by Yaron Galai and Ori Lahav, who were both officers in the Israeli Navy. Galai sold his company Quigo to AOL in 2007 for $363 million. Lahav worked at Shopping.com, acquired by eBay in 2005.

The company is headquartered in New York with global offices in London, San Francisco, Chicago, Washington, D.C., Cologne, Gurugram, Paris, Ljubljana, Munich, Milan, Madrid, Tokyo, São Paulo, Netanya, Singapore, and Sydney.

Outbrain went public in July 2021. The company offered 8 million shares in the IPO, bringing in $160 million.

=== Mergers and acquisitions ===
Outbrain has acquired 6 companies—related content recommendation platform, Surphace (February 2011), content curation platform, Scribit (December 2012), and predictive analytics company, Visual Revenue (March 2013). In early 2016, Outbrain acquired technology company Revee. In July 2017, Outbrain acquired Zemanta. In February 2019, Outbrain acquired Ligatus.

In October 2019, Outbrain announced its intention to merge with Taboola under the Taboola brand. In September 2020, Taboola and Outbrain ceased merger discussions.

In August 2024, Outbrain and Teads announced plans to merge in "an approximately $1 billion transaction".

In February 2025, Outrain announced the closing of its acquisition of Teads, following receipt of all necessary regulatory approvals. Following Outbrain’s acquisition of Teads in February 2025, they announced in June that the combined company has completed its corporate renaming from “Outbrain Inc.” to “Teads Holding Co.”

== Business model ==
Advertisers typically pay on a pay-per-click basis and publishers generate income from external clicks. Approximately 75% of that revenue is paid to the site or app which presented the Outbrain link. Outbrain shares advertising revenue with publishers who implement their feeds or links on their sites, which are sometimes referred to as chumboxes.

== Reception ==
Outbrain has often been compared with competitor Taboola. One way that Outbrain claimed to distinguish itself from Taboola was that it tried to pre-filter spammy links before displaying them, whereas Taboola had a feature called Taboola Choice, where users can offer feedback on what recommendations they do not like.

Both Outbrain and Taboola have been described by Internet commentators as alternatives to Google AdSense that content publishers could consider for revenue streams.

In November 2012, in response to criticism of it for low-quality links, Outbrain decided to cut off showing such links and stated that doing so would cause it a 25% revenue cut, but that it was important for its long-term reputation with publishers and users. In 2021, Outbrain revamped its algorithm to incorporate machine learning and artificial intelligence to improve the quality of its ads. However, the quality of Outbrain's recommendations have been debated.

== See also ==
- VigLink
- Chumbox
