= Clickbait =

Web content intended to entice users to click on a link

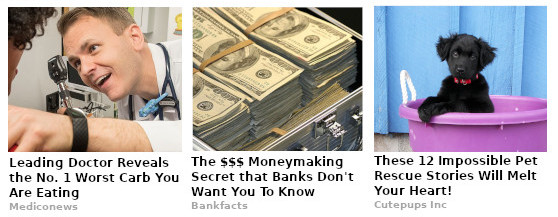
Fictional examples of "chumbox" style adverts, employing common clickbait tactics of using an information gap to encourage reader curiosity, and promising easy-to-read numbered lists

Clickbait (also known as link bait or linkbait) is a text or a thumbnail link that is designed to attract attention and to entice users to follow ("click") that link and view, read, stream or listen to the linked piece of online content, being typically deceptive, sensationalized, or otherwise misleading. A "teaser" aims to exploit the "curiosity gap", providing just enough information to make readers of news websites curious, but not enough to satisfy their curiosity without clicking through to the linked content. Clickbait headlines often add an element of dishonesty, using enticements that do not accurately reflect the content being delivered. The -bait suffix makes an analogy with fishing, where a hook is disguised by an enticement (bait), presenting the impression to the fish that it is a desirable thing to swallow.

Before the Internet, a marketing practice known as bait-and-switch used similar dishonest methods to hook customers. To an extreme degree, like bait-and-switch, clickbait is a form of fraud. (Click fraud, however, is a separate form of online misrepresentation which uses a more extreme disconnect between what is presented on the front side of the link and what is on the click-through side of the link, also encompassing malicious code.) The term clickbait does not encompass all cases where the user arrives at a destination that is not anticipated from the link that is clicked.

== Definition ==
A defining characteristic of clickbait is misrepresentation in the enticement presented to the user to manipulate them to click onto a link. While there is no universally agreed-upon definition of clickbait, Merriam-Webster defines clickbait as "something designed to make readers want to click on a hyperlink, especially when the link leads to content of dubious value or interest." Dictionary.com states that clickbait is "a sensationalized headline or piece of text on the Internet designed to entice people to follow a link to an article on another web page."

In 2014, Buzzfeed's editor-in-chief, Ben Smith, stated that his publication avoided using clickbait, using a strict definition of clickbait as a headline that is dishonest about the content of the article. Smith noted that Buzzfeed headlines such as "A 5-Year-Old Girl Raised Enough Money To Take Her Father Who Has Terminal Cancer To Disney World" delivered exactly what the headline promised. The fact that the headline was written to be eye-catching was irrelevant in Smith's view, since the headline accurately described the article.

Facebook, while trying to reduce the amount of clickbait shown to users, defined the term as a headline that encourages users to click, but does not tell them what they will see; however, this definition excludes much content that is generally regarded as clickbait.

A more commonly used definition is a headline that intentionally overpromises and underdelivers. The articles associated with such headlines often are unoriginal, and either merely restate the headline, or copy content from a more genuine news source.

The term clickbait is sometimes used for any article that is unflattering to a person; in such cases, the article is not actually clickbait by any legitimate definition of the term.

== Background ==
From a historical perspective, the techniques employed by clickbait authors can be considered derivative of yellow journalism, which presented little or no legitimate well-researched news and instead used eye-catching headlines that included exaggerations of news events, scandal-mongering, or sensationalism. One cause of such sensational stories is the controversial practice called checkbook journalism, where news reporters pay sources for their information without verifying its truth. In the U.S. it is generally considered an unethical practice, as it often turns celebrities and politicians into lucrative targets of unproven allegations. According to the Washington Post writer Howard Kurtz, "this thriving tabloid culture has erased the old definitions of news by including tawdry and sensational stories about celebrities for the sake of profit."

== Use ==
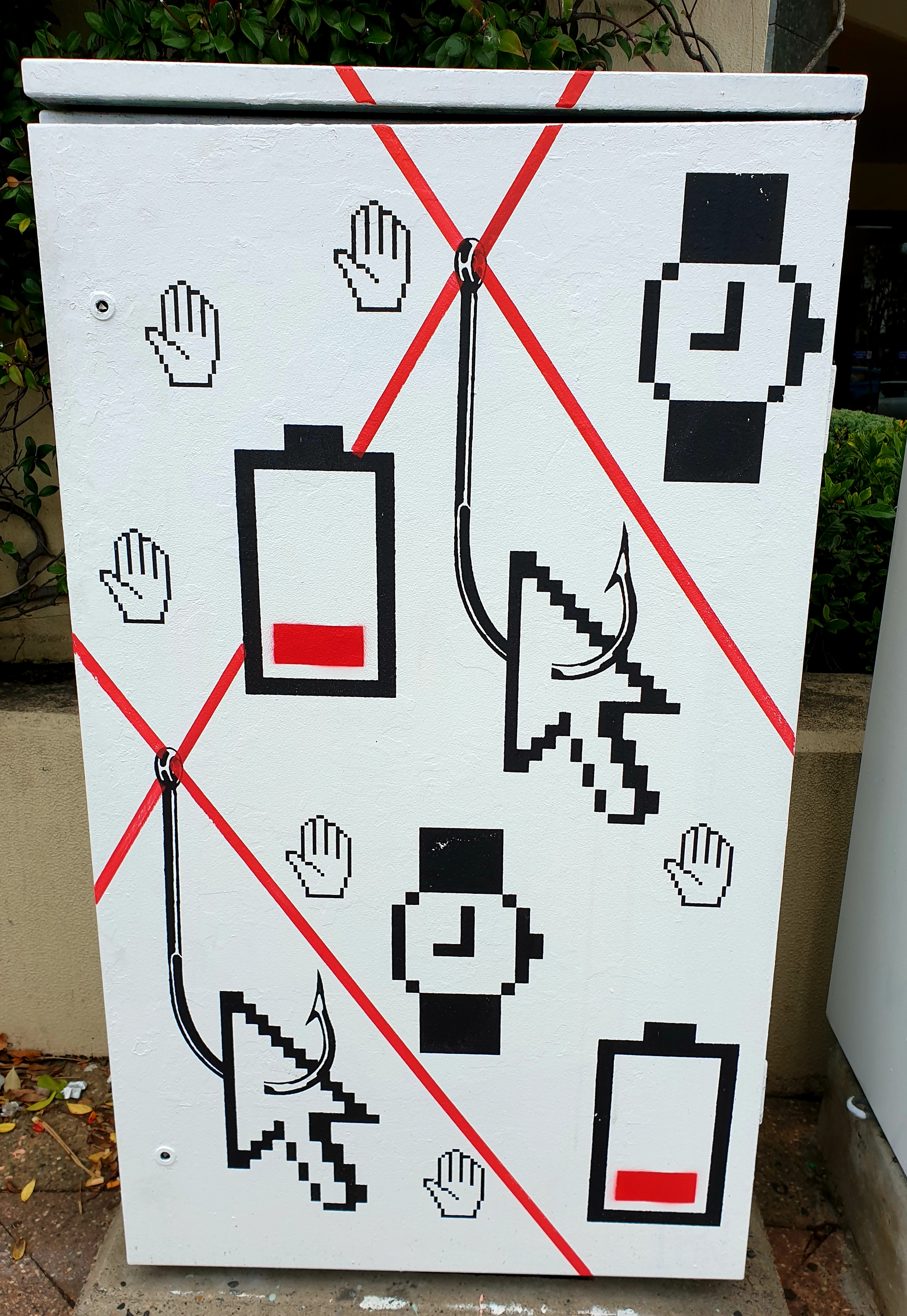
Artistic representation of "clickbait", Bondi Junction, Australia

Clickbait is primarily used to drive page views on websites, whether for their own purposes or to increase online advertising revenue. It can also be used for phishing attacks for the purpose of spreading malicious files or stealing user information; the attack occurs once the user opens the link provided to learn more. Clickbait has been used for political ends and blamed for the rise of post-truth politics. Katharine Viner, editor-in-chief at The Guardian, wrote that "chasing down cheap clicks at the expense of accuracy and veracity" undermined the value of journalism and truth. Emotional subjects with stark headlines are widely shared and clicked, which resulted in what Slate described as an "aggregation of outrage" and a proliferation of websites across the political spectrum — including Breitbart News, Huffington Post, Salon, Townhall and the Gawker Media blogs — which profited by producing shareable short-form pieces offering simple moral judgements on political and cultural issues.

Click-through rates (CTRs) on YouTube show that videos with a hyperbolic or misleading title, created for the purpose of being attention-grabbing, displayed higher click-through rates than videos which did not. Clickbait tactics generally lead to higher clickthrough rates, and to higher revenue and optimization of a content creator's overall engagement. Engagement bait is manipulative content that is designed to elicit users into interaction. Used in social media marketing, the artificial interactions, typically in the form of comments, likes, shares, or tags, are used subsequently monetized and used to popularize products and narratives.

There are various clickbait strategies, including the composition of headlines of news and online articles that build suspense and sensation, luring and teasing users to click. Some of the popular approaches in achieving these include the presentation of link and images that are interesting to the user, exploiting curiosity related to greed or prurient interest. It is not uncommon, for instance, for these contents to include lewd imagery or a "make money quick" scheme.

Clickbait is also used in abundance on streaming platforms that thrive with targeted ads and personalization. At the International Consumer Electronics Show, YouTube revealed that most of the videos watched and watchtime generated did not come from Google searches, but from personalized advertisements and the recommendations page. Recommendations on YouTube are driven by a viewer's personal watch history and videos that get an abundance of clicks. On a streaming platform like YouTube, which has upwards of 122 million active users a day, the videos that are watched are very likely to be those with clickbait in either the title or thumbnail of the video, garnering attention and therefore clicks.

== Backlash ==
By 2014, the ubiquity of clickbait on the web had begun to lead to a backlash against its use. The satirical newspaper The Onion launched a new website, ClickHole, that parodied clickbait websites such as Upworthy and BuzzFeed, and, in August of that same year, Facebook announced that it was taking technical measures to reduce the impact of clickbait on its social network, using, among other cues, the time spent by the user on visiting the linked page as a way of distinguishing clickbait from other types of content. Ad blockers and a general fall in advertising clicks also affected the clickbait model, as websites moved toward sponsored advertising and native advertising having content more important than its click-rate.

Web browsers have incorporated tools to detect and mitigate the clickbait problem, while social media platforms such as Twitter and Facebook have implemented algorithms to filter clickbait contents. Social media groups, such as Stop Clickbait, combat clickbait by giving a short summary of the clickbait article, closing the "curiosity gap". Clickbait-reporting browser plug-ins have also been developed by the research community in order to report clickbait links for further advances in the field based on supervised learning algorithms. Security software providers offer advice on how to avoid harmful clickbait.

== See also ==
- 5-Minute Crafts – Cypriot YouTube channel and content farm
- Attention economy – Economic view of human attention as a commodity
- Betteridge's law of headlines – Journalistic adage on questions in headlines
- Chumbox – Form of online advertising
- Content farm – Organization that creates web content optimised for views
- Digital display advertising – Type of advertising
- Media manipulation – Techniques in which partisans create an image that favours their interests
- Outrage porn – Media designed to evoke outrage for online attention
- Rage-baiting – Internet rage incitement
- Rickrolling – Internet meme and prank
- Sensationalism – Type of editorial tactic used in mass media
- Sticky content – Style of web content
- Tabloid journalism – Style of largely sensationalist journalism
- Viral marketing – Marketing strategy that uses existing social networks to promote a product
- Yellow journalism – Sensationalistic news
