= Oliver Roup =

Canadian computer scientist

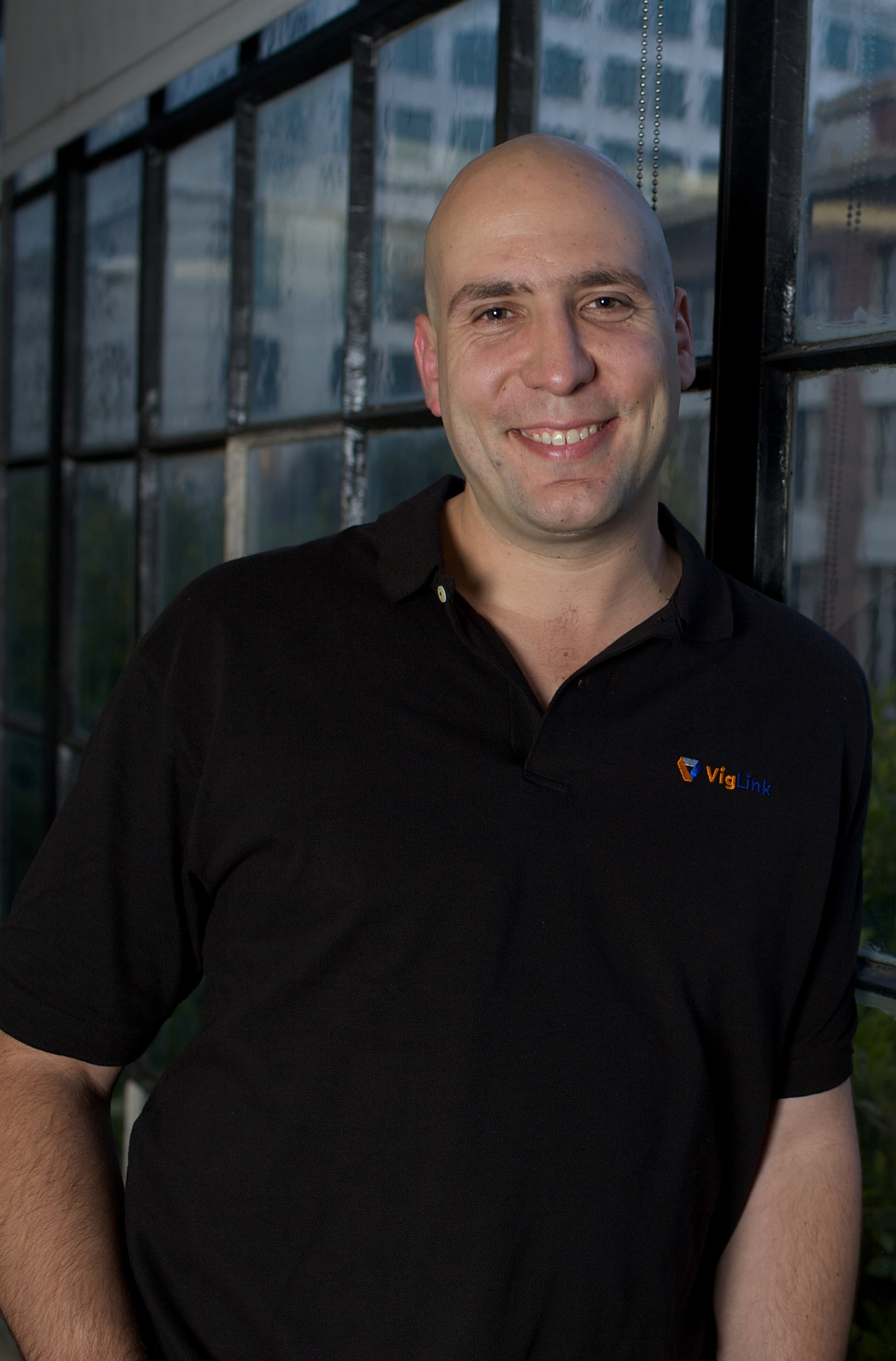
- Born: 1975 (age 50–51); Cape Town, South Africa (brought up in Toronto, Ontario, Canada)
- Known for: Founder and CEO of VigLink, board member of the Performance Marketing Association and chair of the PMA Content Monetization Council

Oliver Roup is an American entrepreneur and computer scientist originally from Toronto, Ontario, Canada. Roup is the founder and CEO of the content monetization service VigLink.

== Early life and education ==
Roup was born in Cape Town in 1975 and his family moved to Canada when he was about one year old. Roup obtained a bachelor's and master's degree in computer science from MIT as well as an MBA from the Harvard Business School.

== Career ==
Roup started working at Microsoft where he was responsible for directing products for media properties like Xbox Live Marketplace, Zune Marketplace, and MSN Entertainment. He has also served in roles at Echo networks, Paul Allen's Vulcan Inc., the BBC’s iPlayer, and the Founders Fund. Some of his patents cover micro-transactions, media, and metadata.

In 2009, Roup founded VigLink, a service that connects web publishers and bloggers with affiliate advertising solutions and became its CEO. In a January 2012 interview with Idea Mensch, he was quoted as saying that the inspiration for VigLink came when he “wrote a crawler to count links to Amazon on the web and found that less than 50% were enrolled in the affiliate program (meaning the publisher would be compensated if a purchase resulted from the click)” and that he viewed the discovery as “an indicator that there was room for improvement in the space. Publishers either weren’t aware that affiliate programs existed or found them too time consuming and difficult to use.”

=== Early attempts at fundraising ===
Roup began to raise seed funding for his business ideas in 2009 during his final semester at Harvard Business School. After 95 pitches, Josh Kopelman at First Round Capital offered to invest in the business. He eventually decided to buy Driving Revenue, a competitor with strong sales, and was able to raise $1.1 million from investors.

=== Views on affiliate marketing ===
Roup has commented that he believes the area of affiliate marketing has become more mainstream. He cites the transition to mainstream practices as a reason for the term “affiliate marketing” being replaced by “content monetization” or “content-driven commerce.” He has charted the growth of the industry from websites offering coupons to media service providers like Huffington Post providing affiliate marketing-oriented content.

== Other positions ==
In addition to being the founder and CEO of VigLink, Roup is on the board of directors for the Performance Marketing Association and chairs the Council on Content Monetization.
