= Emily Hart (virtual influencer) =

- Emily Hart
- First appearance: 2025
- Created by: Indian medical student known only as "Sam"

Emily Hart was a virtual influencer created by an Indian medical student using generative artificial intelligence, active on Instagram and Fanvue from January 2025 to February 2026. She was represented as a nurse working in New York City, strongly supportive of President Donald Trump. Pictures were regularly posted of her wearing a bikini, ice fishing, drinking beer, and handling firearms, accompanied by messages supporting Trump's policies and the MAGA movement.

For about an hour of work a day, Hart's creator said he was able to make more money than most Indian professionals, which he used to finance his education through subscriptions and merchandise sales. His early attempts with a generic "hot girl" influencer were not successful. When he asked Google's Gemini large language model for suggestions on how to improve the product's performance, the program suggested he orient the character toward conservative American men. He did so, and soon had millions of views and thousands of followers.

Eventually, technology magazine Wired revealed that Hart was not real. After it contacted Meta Platforms, Instagram's parent corporation, the Hart accounts there and on Facebook were shut down. Her creator, identified by Wired with the pseudonym "Sam", has declined to publicly identify himself, since he hopes to emigrate to the U.S. and work there and fears that he would be unable to do so if his name were known.

== Creation ==
"Sam", a medical student from North India, had received some money for his education from his parents. Most of it went to paying for his licensing exams, however, and he needed additional income for his daily expenses, as well as saving for a planned trip to the U.S., where he hoped to get a job as an orthopedic surgeon after completing his studies. He attempted to gain additional income by selling his notes and posting videos on YouTube, but was unsuccessful.

At first, Sam had little success with his creations. He asked Gemini, Google's large language model, for advice. It told him that he needed to make his creation stand out from the many other similar influencers: "If you create a generic 'hot girl', you're competing with a million other models," and therefore suggested he find a niche for her. From a list of suggestions he provided, it recommended especially the "MAGA/conservative niche". It told him that older American men in that demographic often have high disposable income and are very loyal.

One of the memes of Emily that Sam generated through AI and posted on her feed

Sam then created Emily Hart. Basing her appearance on Jennifer Lawrence, he represented Emily as a single nurse in her early 20s. He posted AI-generated images of her at work, shooting guns at a rifle range, ice fishing and drinking Coors Light beer. Those images were often complemented by text stating a MAGA position on a political issue, such as "if you want a reason to unfollow: Christ is king, abortion is murder, and all illegals must be deported" or "Trump should tell all illegals that he will give them citizenship if they vote Republican and see how fast Democrats want them out of the country." Since he had never been to the U.S., Sam spent time studying MAGA online to come up with opinions for Emily to express: "Every day I'd write something pro-Christian, pro-Second Amendment, pro-life, anti-abortion, anti-woke, and anti-immigration."

== Reception ==
Emily Hart proved to be as successful for Sam as Gemini had suggested. "Every Reel I posted was getting 3 million views, 5 million views, 10 million views," he said, adding that "the algorithm loved it." Progressives on the platform also drove engagement, leaving angry, negative comments. Within a month, Hart's Instagram account had over 10,000 followers, and Sam diversified. He began selling T-shirts with political slogans like "PTSD: Pretty Tired of Stupid Democrats" and opened a subscription-based account on Fanvue, a competitor to OnlyFans whose policies are more tolerant of AI-generated content, where he sold nude pictures of Hart generated by Grok.

Sam told Wired this was soon earning him US$3–5,000 a month, better money than most Indian professionals. He stated that "I was spending maybe 30 to 50 minutes of my day, and I was making good money for a medical student", and that "I haven't seen any easier way to make money online." He experimented with complementing Hart with an AI-generated young woman sharing progressive politics online along with suggestive content, but that failed because according to him "Democrats know that it's AI slop, so they don't engage as much."

Sam stated that the Fanvue account was where he made most of his money from Hart, as he could not monetize the main Instagram account. Hart's Instagram did not promote the Fanvue account as this might not have been well received by the core base. Nevertheless, Hart was besieged with messages and requests on Fanvue from the moment he opened the account. He did not enjoy interacting with her followers—one admirer sent Hart a video of himself masturbating with a pillow while he viewed some explicit images of her on a tablet. Sam said that "it was incredibly weird, but he sent me a $50 tip, so I was like, OK, do what you want."

== Termination ==
In February 2026, Instagram terminated the Emily Hart account after it was flagged as fraudulent. What led to that flag is not known. An associated Facebook page remained active at the time Wired reported the story in late April, though by May it too appeared to have been shut down. Sam told Wired that he was probably going to stop posting around that time in any event in order to concentrate on his studies.

== Commentary ==
Sam told Wired that he had no regrets and did not believe that he had defrauded any of Hart's followers and fans because he was giving them what they paid for. The Organisation for Economic Co-operation and Development's AI monitor considers Emily Hart to meet its definition of fraud and lists her as an AI incident. "The AI system's outputs were central to the deception and monetization, directly causing harm to the users who were misled and financially exploited. The account was removed for fraudulent activity, confirming the harm occurred", its own AI-generated report says. "This fits the definition of an AI Incident as the AI system's use directly led to harm (financial and trust-related) to groups of people."

Sam has not been the only content creator to make money and attract fans with a virtual MAGA influencer. Shortly before Wired reported on Emily Hart, The Washington Post broke the story that "Jessica Foster", another apparent young woman online popular with Trump supporters, was actually an AI creation. Foster's Instagram feed depicted her as a blonde white woman in her 20s serving in the U.S. Army, sometimes photographed with Trump and other prominent U.S. and international leaders. There were some imperfections in the photos posted that gave away the use of generative software to make them: the nametag on her uniform said "Jessica" despite that Army regulations require only the last name be used and the sign on the podium of a Board of Peace meeting she appeared to speak at read "Border of Peace". There are other MAGA virtual influencers, often presenting as young, blonde white women in their 20s, who like Foster and Hart are depicted working either in the military or as first responders.

Valerie Wirtschafter, a Brookings Institution fellow who studies technology and democracy, says that while fictitious online personae are not new, the use of AI has given them credibility. She adds that since women in their 20s are much more likely to be politically liberal than like-aged men, young women online claiming a MAGA identity are "more attention-grabbing". During the 2024 United States presidential election, she recalled that Trump shared on his Truth Social feed images of purported "Swifties For Trump" that on close examination appeared to have been generated by an AI program.

Sam said that few of Hart's fans cared whether she was real. According to Wirtschafter, for Hart's fans, the idea of an attractive young woman with politics like theirs was the important aspect. She said that "even among some digital natives, there's a perspective of, 'Well, I don't actually care if this is true. I like the sentiment of it.'" Sam, meanwhile, stated his belief that "the MAGA crowd is made up of dumb people—like, super dumb people. And they fall for it."

Some commentators considered Hart's effect on AI. India's magazine Puthiya Thalaimurai argued that "while debates rage over artificial intelligence taking away jobs, here it seems to have created a new one: full-time fake influencer." At Creative Bloq, Joe Foley pondered the possibility that a glut of AI-created influencers might "lead to a situation where people only trust influencers who are already actually famous, or who have a recognised presence offline. Anyone else could be fake." On the other hand, like Wirtschafter, he noted that "[t]here are plenty of people who knowingly follow so-called AI-influencers and don't seem to see that as sad."

== See also ==
- AI-generated content in American politics
