= Outrage industrial complex =

Media increasing engagement through outrage

The outrage industrial complex (OIC) is a combination of forces including media outlets, social media influencers, political fundraising messaging, and individuals in media, political leadership or advocacy that in the late 20th and early 21st centuries exploited differences of opinion and what was termed a culture of contempt drawn along political and social lines, increasing distrust of institutions and society, to advance their own desires for fame, wealth, higher office, or for geopolitical reasons.

The OIC creates and distributes outrage media, digital or print content specifically intended to provoke anger or outrage among its consumers to increase engagement.

== Makeup ==
The complex includes media outlets, social media influencers, political fundraising messaging, and individuals in media, political leadership or advocacy who call out "outrages", hoping to generate what Richard Thompson Ford, writing for The American Interest, calls a sense of "righteous indignation" and rage borne of frustration in their readers or listeners, often for their own purposes of attracting advertisers or fame or to intentionally cause social disruption in a country or region.

== History ==
Rockefeller Brothers CEO Stephen B. Heintz said that the issue has been "fifty years in the making" while Craig Keaton of Texas Christian University said that "researchers, thinkers, writers, and advocates" began "warning about" the OIC in the late 2010s.

Ford notes that the generation of outrage for one's own purposes is not a new concept, but had moved from "the cliched angry young man" into the general population, regardless of age or social class. He argued in 2019 that the sense of "comfortable complacency" being inherently evil and of outrage being a means to achieve positive change could be traced back to Friedrich Nietzsche, Aldous Huxley, and Lewis Mumford.

A theory of political physics, sometimes called the physics of politics, uses a rough formula to describe the phenomenon: Pi = (Ci + O)L, or perceived importance is equal to the sum of cosmic importance + outrage expressed multiplied by the loudness of the expressed outrage.

== Strategy and mechanics ==
Rage baiting, outrage porn, etc. involve media broadcast of content designed to manipulate increased viewer engagement, often by provoking negative emotional responses aligned with political or other narratives.

According to the Dallas News, the strategy of the outrage industrial complex is to exploit the human evolutionary tendency toward distrust of outgroups. According to Peter T. Coleman, writing for Yes! magazine, "experiencing a perceived wrong or injustice — especially to one's in-group — activates the same reward and habit regions of the brain (the nucleus accumbens and dorsal striatum) as substance addiction, triggering cravings in anticipation of experiencing pleasure and relief through retaliation". Tim Shriver agreed that the mechanics mirrored those of addiction, calling it "the business model".

Arthur C. Brooks agrees that the cycle resembles addiction, writing in the New York Times in 2019 that the OIC creates "a species of addiction by feeding our desire to believe that we are completely right and that the other side is made up of knaves and fools. It strokes our own biases while affirming our worst assumptions about those who disagree with us." Brooks also argues OIC exploits the motive attribution asymmetry, a psychological and sociological theory that humans in conflict tend to believe they are motivated by positive goals while the other side is motivated by negative goals.

Ford notes the basic strategy is circular: "Dangle a few choice offensive comments about sensitive topics such as affirmative action, feminism, or sexual orientation, and wait for earnest undergraduates to rise to the bait and stage a noisy outraged demonstration, thus allowing the provocateurs to wrap themselves in the First Amendment and lament the outrageousness of the heckler's veto".

Arthur C. Brooks notes that a given media outlet tends to stake out a side on any given issue and exploit that side's fears and anxieties and promote a "culture of contempt" which assumes the worst of those on the opposite side of any issue. According to Psychology Today, this culture of contempt creates "a feeling of moral superiority that fuels our fantasies of 'owning,' 'trolling,' 'dunking on,' and 'throwing shade' at adversaries"; Brooks writes that this includes seeing those adversaries as "not just wrong, but in some ways worthless as people, or even bad, or evil".

=== Fodder ===
According to Ford, fodder for outrage media includes any topic there is profound disagreement on, including "cultural insensitivity, the hordes of illegal immigrants pouring into our country, the assault on reproductive freedom, abortion-on-demand, hetero-normativity, transphobia, transgender bathrooms, neo-socialism, neo-fascism, liberal fascism, neoliberalism, micro-aggressions, liberal snowflakes, insensitivity to religious minorities, and the war on Christmas". Outrage media uses commentary on such topics created specifically to provoke anger or outrage among its consumers. It is characterized by insincere rage, umbrage and indignation without personal accountability or commitment.

== Motivation ==
According to media and advertising professional Dan Granger, writing in USA Today, measures of advertising effectiveness and engagement show "there's a clear correlation between loud, polarizing content and successful ad performance" and that the "incentive structure [...] reward[s] attention gained by exploiting our differences". David Axelrod notes that Marjorie Taylor Greene, a frequent creator of outrage media, is an extremely effective political fundraiser. Brooks said that when someone allows themselves to be influenced by outrage media, "somebody else is profiting." Tim Shriver of UNITE said "it works for those selling it. It is rewarded with clicks, votes and donations". Media outlets are often incentivized to feign or foster outrage as it leads to increased page views, sharing, and comments, which are all lucrative online behaviors.

=== Algorithms ===
Most social media business models depend on engagement as a revenue source. Facebook's algorithm, which rewards interaction and delivers content similar to that which spurred interaction, "privileges incendiary content", according to Luke Munn of the University of Queensland, writing in the journal Humanities and Social Sciences Communications. YouTube's algorithm "[leads] users towards more extreme content"; both are termed by Munn "hate-inducing architectures".

== Importance ==
In 2019 Ford called outrage the "defining emotional state of our era". Marc Ambinder, writing in The Atlantic in 2009, said it had become the "default emotion" in political strategy.

== Practitioners ==
Brooks estimates that the "5% fringes" on either side of the political spectrum represent those competing and cooperating with those on the other side of the spectrum in mutually benefitting from OIC.

Ford and others call out influencers expert at producing outrage. Brooks notes that a given practitioner, whether an individual, a group, or a media outlet, tends to stake out an ideological side on any given issue and exploit that side's fears and anxieties.

- Tucker Carlson
- Ann Coulter
- Marjorie Taylor Greene
- Bill O'Reilly
- Ben Shapiro
- Fox News
- Gawker
- Huffington Post
- Jezebel
- MSNBC
- Salon
- Talking Points Memo
- Valleywag
- Milo Yiannopoulos
- Jubilee Media

== Notable topics and incidents ==
- Brett Kavanaugh Supreme Court nomination
- Climate change
- Voter identification laws

== Countering efforts ==
Coleman and others note multiple organizations that work to counter divisions caused by the OIC; by Coleman's estimate there are thousands.

- Ad Fontes Media
- Braver Angels
- BridgeUSA
- Dignity Index
- Kentucky Rural-Urban Exchange
- Living Room Conversations
- Lyceum Movement
- Media Roundtable
- Minnesota Rural-Urban Exchange
- More in Common
- National Institute for Civil Discourse
- NewGround
- Trust for Civic Life
- Trust in Elections
- UNITE

== In popular culture ==
The 2024 film Civil War explored a possible near future in which the United States was embroiled in a second civil war over political divisions. It was cited by Steven Olikara in an opinion piece about how it could spark conversation about the OIC.

== See also ==
- Cancel culture
- Concern troll
- Moral panic
- Online shaming
- Ragebait
- Sensationalism
- Trolling
- Outrage porn
