= Taboola =

American advertising and technology company

Taboola, Inc.
- Type: Public
- Traded as: Nasdaq: TBLA
- Industry: Technology
- Founded: 2007; 19 years ago
- Founder: Adam Singolda
- Headquarters: New York City, U.S.
- Number of locations: 35
- Key people: Adam Singolda (CEO); Eldad Maniv (president, COO); Stephen Walker (CFO); Lior Golan (CTO)
- Products: Realize, DeeperDive, Taboola Feed, Taboola for Audience, and Taboola News
- Revenue: ▲US$1.9 billion (2025)
- Operating income: ▲US$44.1 million (2025)
- Net income: ▲US$−42.3 million (2025)
- Total assets: ▲US$1.60 billion (2025)
- Number of employees: c. 2,000 (2024)
- Website: taboola.com realize.com

Taboola is a public advertising technology company headquartered in New York City. Founded in 2007 by Adam Singolda, who serves as its CEO, the company operates a digital advertising platform that connects advertisers with audiences across a network of publisher websites and digital properties. Taboola's platform uses machine learning techniques, including contextual and behavioral signals, to match advertisements and content recommendations with users on the open web.

== History ==
Taboola was founded in 2007 by Adam Singolda in Israel. Initially, the company focused on developing a recommendation engine for video content. Taboola raised $1.5 million in funding in November 2007, and moved its headquarters to New York City. By 2010, Taboola expanded its technology to include recommendations for text-based articles and slideshows.

The company subsequently raised $4.5 million in November 2008 and $9 million in August 2011. In February 2013, Taboola raised $15 million in Series D funding. In December 2013, the company launched "Taboola Choice," allowing users to filter unwanted recommendations.

In May 2014, the Better Business Bureau's National Advertising Division (NAD) requested that Taboola clarify its "sponsored content" disclosures following a complaint regarding the conspicuousness of its labeling. In August 2014, Taboola acquired a California-based programmatic advertising company called Perfect Market.

In February 2015, Taboola raised $117 million in a Series E funding round. In May of that year, Taboola announced additional funding from Baidu for an undisclosed amount.

By 2016, Taboola widgets were embedded in 41 of the top 50 news sites globally, including The Guardian and CNN. Taboola acquired Convert Media, a recommendation engine for video content, in July 2016, and Commerce Sciences, a website personalization firm, in January 2017.

By 2018, the company focused on brand safety, establishing monitoring teams in 30 languages and partnering with industry bodies like IAB, Moat, TAG, IAS, and DoubleVerify.

By 2019, Taboola provided 450 billion recommendations per month, due to adoption by major news websites, like The Weather Company. Following a failed merger attempt with competitor Outbrain in 2019–2020, Taboola became a publicly traded company on the Nasdaq on June 30, 2021, via a merger with ION Acquisition Corp. at a valuation of approximately $2.6 billion.

On 23 July 2021, Taboola announced the acquisition of Connexity, a e-commerce and retail-focused advertising technology company, for $800M from Symphony Technology Group.

In February 2022, Taboola was awarded the Gold Standard 2.0 Certification by IAB UK. Despite these efforts, a January 2024 study suggested that ads from various vendors, including Taboola, were still appearing on "Made for Advertising" (MFA) websites; the company subsequently expanded its use of third-party filters intended to improve inventory quality.

In July 2022, Taboola completed the acquisition of Gravity R&D, a Budapest-based personalization technology company. As part of the acquisition, Taboola established a new research and development hub in Hungary focused on its AI, SmartBid, and e-commerce personalization.

=== Yahoo partnership ===
On November 28, 2022, Taboola announced that it had signed a 30-year, exclusive commercial agreement with Yahoo!. Under the deal, Taboola will exclusively power native advertising on all of Yahoo's digital properties globally, such as Yahoo! Finance, Yahoo! Sports, Yahoo! News, AOL and Engadget, with Taboola Ads also available to buy through the Yahoo DSP. Yahoo is receiving 24.99% of Taboola's total issued and outstanding shares as part of the agreement, as well as one representative on the Taboola Board of Directors.

In early 2025, Taboola shifted its focus to becoming a performance advertising engine. In February 2025, the company launched Realize, a performance marketing platform designed to deliver measurable outcomes like lead generation and purchases across premium publisher and OEM inventory. In April 2026, the company launched Realize+, an AI-powered ad optimization system, Decision Engine, including an autonomous ad creative and management feature, Element Generator, to automate campaign adjustments.

== Products and services ==
Taboola's Facebook-like scrollable feed

Taboola operates a two-sided advertising technology platform that connects advertisers with publishers across the open web, generating revenue primarily through a cost-per-click model in which advertiser spending is shared with publisher partners. Its advertiser platform, Realize, launched in 2025, uses contextual signals, deep learning, and predictive modeling to deliver native, display, and video ads, and includes generative AI tools for campaign creation and creative production. For publishers, Taboola offers monetization, AI-driven content personalization, push-notification re-engagement, and audience-insight tools. In June 2025, the company launched DeeperDive, a generative AI answer engine that runs on publisher websites and produces conversational responses sourced from the publisher's own content.

=== Advertiser products and services ===
==== Realize ====
In 2025, Taboola introduced Realize, an advertising platform focused on performance-based campaigns, supporting traditional native advertising, display, video, carousel, and app promotion.

Realize uses Taboola’s publisher network to distribute advertising across the open web, allowing advertisers to reach audiences during content consumption outside of search and social platforms. In 2024, Taboola’s platform, including its Realize performance advertising technology, reached approximately 600 million daily active users across its publisher network, drawing on placements on major sites such as NBC News, Yahoo, Time, Weather Channel Digital, and Nexstar properties.

The platform uses machine learning–based optimization and first-party data from Taboola’s integrations with publisher sites. It applies artificial intelligence to this data to support campaign optimization and to measure outcomes such as site engagement, lead generation, app installs, and purchases.

In April 2026, Taboola announced the launch of Realize+, an agentic AI system that continuously decides and executes strategic decisions on behalf of advertisers to improve performance. This launch was accompanied by the introduction of the first Claude Skills and the Model Context Protocol (MCP) integration, enabling AI agents to interact directly with Taboola's internal systems.

==== Campaign automation ====
The Realize platform utilizes an automated bidding strategy known as Maximize Conversions, which is powered by the SmartBid machine learning algorithm. This system analyzes historical data and first-party signals across a network of direct publisher integrations to predict conversion rates and automate bid adjustments. The algorithm is designed to generate the highest possible conversion volume within a specified daily budget or a defined Target CPA (Cost Per Acquisition). For manual oversight, the platform includes Custom Rules for task automation and SpendGuard, an automated monitoring tool that pauses campaign elements that exceed predefined performance thresholds to minimize inefficient expenditure.

==== Audience targeting and data activation ====
Audience targeting within the platform is supported by Predictive Audiences, a feature powered by AI and machine learning that identifies new user segments by modeling the behaviors of existing conversion data from pixel or server-to-server (S2S) events. Additionally, the platform provides contextual targeting, such as topics targeting, which allow advertisers to reach users based on the content of the page they are consuming. It functions independently of third-party cookies, utilizing internal contextual signals to align advertisements with relevant editorial environments.

==== Creative adaptation ====
Creative management is performed through the GenAI Ad Maker, a set of AI-powered tools integrated directly into the platform. These tools enable the generation of ad creatives, background replacement, and image extension to modify existing assets. The suite also includes GenAI Motion Ads, which use prompt-based generation to add motion to static images. For multi-format delivery, the platform supports multiple formats, including Display and Vertical Video, which allow creatives to be adapted for various placements across the publisher network.

=== Publisher products and services ===
DeeperDive

In 2025, Taboola introduced DeeperDive, a generative AI‑powered answer engine designed to operate on publisher websites and provide conversational, natural language responses to user queries using the publisher’s own content. DeeperDive generates real‑time answers and surfaces related articles from a publication’s archive, allowing users to explore information in context without leaving the site, and was initially adopted by publishers such as USA Today and The Independent as part of beta testing. Taboola and partners positioned the technology as an on‑site alternative to external generative AI search tools by leveraging publishers’ own journalistic content for responses.

DeeperDive produces direct answers while also listing contextually relevant articles from the host outlet and integrating search‑like features aimed at maintaining reader engagement and site traffic.

==== Taboola Feed ====
Taboola Feed is a continuous-scroll content recommendation format introduced by Taboola in 2017. The feature presents a vertically scrolling series of content “cards” below articles that can include publisher content, in-feed video, personalized ads , and other items, resembling the feed formats used on social media.

Taboola for Audience

Taboola for Audience is a publisher‑focused audience development offering introduced by Taboola in 2024. It combines audience development and personalization tools to help publishers attract, retain, and understand their readers as traffic from search engines and social media shifts.

Taboola for Audience comprises several Taboola products, including Taboola Push and Homepage for You. Taboola Push, which was launched in early 2025, is a product within Taboola for Audience allowing publishers to send personalized web push notifications directly to users’ devices, both desktop and mobile, even when they are not actively on the publisher’s website. Homepage for You, which was launched in 2022, is an AI-powered tool within Taboola for Audience which allows publishers personalize their homepages. It enables editors to mix human curation with AI, creating customized content recommendations for visitors.

==== Taboola Newsroom ====
Taboola Newsroom, which was launched in 2016, provides real-time, AI-driven insight from 1.4 billion users to help publishers optimize content.

==== Taboola Header Bidding ====
In 2022, Taboola launched its bidding service, allowing to integrate the company’s performance advertising demand into the standard header bidding ecosystem used by digital publishers. The service allows publishers to include Taboola as a bidder within their existing display ad placements.

Taboola News

Taboola News is a mobile content recommendation service operated by Taboola that delivers personalised editorial content from publisher partners and ad content on smartphones and other devices.

== Partnerships ==
In July 2024, Taboola’s technology was integrated with Apple News, allowing content recommendations to appear within the Apple News application on iOS devices.

In March 2025, the company also collaborated with Microsoft, including its MSN and Outlook Mail services, to deliver recommendations across those platforms.

In 2025, Taboola signed agreements with Samsung, where its technology powers content recommendations within the Samsung News application. Partnerships also include LG Ad Solutions for connected TV advertising inventory and Xiaomi for content placement across its international internet business.

In 2025, Taboola partnered with the messaging platform Line to provide content recommendations and advertising within its services. The company also worked with media brands such as Paramount to integrate its content recommendation technology.

== Reception ==
The online thumbnail grid ads promoted by Taboola and other similar companies like Outbrain have been referred to also as chumbox ads.

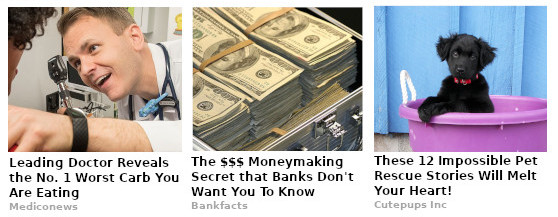
Taboola is infamous for being one of the most common chum box/clickbait ad providers seen on news websites like CNN.

According to Fortune in 2014, "Popular content isn't always good content.", with Fortune stating that while companies that partnered with Taboola and Outbrain for advertising generally earned significant income from the partnership, the ads recommended by these services "often represent the worst of the Web". Advertiser-sponsored content displayed through the platform might include articles such as "The World's Cutest Cat Pictures All On One Site" or "Jeff Bridges' Magnificent Home Is Beyond Stunning". In May 2013, Taboola founder Adam Singolda said the ads help support a sustainable business model for journalism and the company vets ads before they are displayed. The company has faced criticism for its promoted content alongside the rest of the native advertising industry, including concerns about the promotion of clickbait articles. According to comments made to the BBC, Singolda has said "The problem is that for everyone who hates one piece of content, many others love it, and click on it... if no one clicked on it, or tweeted about it, then we would remove it."

In May 2014, the Better Business Bureau's (BBB) National Advertising Division (NAD) requested that Taboola make it clearer that its recommended links are sponsored by advertisers following a complaint by a rival company, Congoo. The NAD said it recommended the changes, citing the Federal Trade Commission (FTC), due to concerns that Taboola's "sponsored content" disclosures "were not sufficiently clear and conspicuous, or easy to notice, read, and understand."

A report in September 2016 from the nonprofit ChangeAdvertising.org found that 41 of the top 50 news sites – including The Guardian, CNN, Time and Forbes – embed widgets from so-called “content-recommendation” companies, including Taboola. Several of those that do not, including The New York Times, pay for content created with advertisers in-house to appear in the widgets to increase traffic to their sites. In 2016, the Taboola widget was installed on a site promoting numerous fake news stories and subsequently appeared in several articles originating from the site, including one claiming Muslim nurses were refusing to wash their hands before surgery at hospitals in the United Kingdom. Taboola subsequently confirmed that the site operators had displayed its code without permission and that they had since removed their code from the site. A company spokesperson said that "Taboola has a very clear and strict set of guidelines in terms of both fake news as well as trademark infringement".

In 2018, regarding the brand safety issue for marketers, Taboola's CEO mentioned that the company employed less than 50 people monitoring 30+ languages, and has established partnerships with IAB, Moat, TAG, Integral Ad Science, and Double Verify to address the issue.

In February 2022, Taboola, a member of the Internet Advertising Bureau (IAB) UK, was awarded the Gold Standard 2.0 Certification by the organization. Some critics have argued that the IAB UK's self-regulatory model and efforts in governmental lobbying may prioritize the interests of its members, which include companies like Taboola, over stricter governmental regulations.

Independent research conducted in January 2024 found that hundreds of major brands have their ads displayed on "Made for Advertising” websites, which are websites that are created for the sole purpose of showing ads. Ad tech vendors, including Taboola, claim to be taking steps to avoid placing ads on MFA sites, but the study found that these efforts appear to be ineffective.

== See also ==
- Clickbait
- Native advertising
- Chumbox, type of advert often used by Taboola
