= Outrage (emotion) =

Emotion characterized by a combination of surprise, disgust, and anger

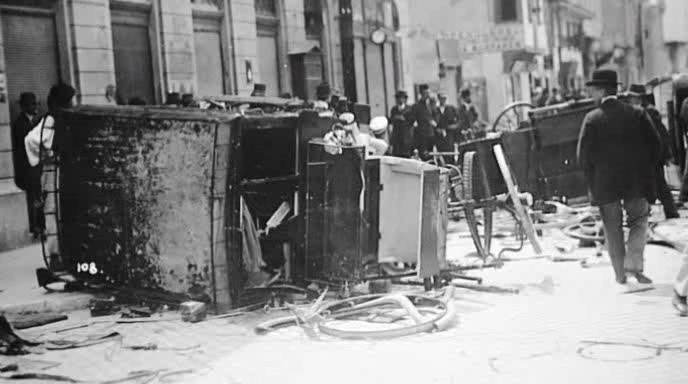
The effect of public outrage over the assassination of Archduke Franz Ferdinand of Austria

Outrage is a strong moral emotion characterized by a combination of surprise, disgust, and anger, usually in reaction to a grave personal offense. It comes from old French "ultrage", which in turn borrows from classical Latin "ultra", meaning "beyond".

Moral outrage is the emotion of outrage experienced in reaction to an injustice, as such involving a moral judgement, and is often accompanied by a desire to shame and/or punish wrongdoers.

== Faux outrage ==
The 21st century and its social media have seen an increased display of false or manufactured outrage, with power and prestige being hypocritically sought by professing concern for others, in a highly selective and temporary manner. In The Sociology of Everyday Life Peacebuilding, John D. Brewer, et al., observed:

'Canonized' and 'preferred victims' generate considerable outrage when their memory is besmirched but the same politicians and spokespeople who express this outrage are content enough to besmirch the memory of dis-preferred victims. In contested peace processes, there are many people who are eager to offend and many only too willing to be offended, and victims easily get used by others to provoke faux outrage. And as public insult and degradation descend to the bottom in competitive faux outrage in the public sphere, victims find themselves used for party political purposes, voiceless and ignored save when it suits those who exploit their suffering and pain.

The authors, whose work focuses primarily on post-conflict peace and resolution, propose a paradox: Individual "preferred victims" lack much if any agency to control how perception of them is manipulated in the public sphere, and can thus feel "owned" by this process and those who are deeply involved in it. Yet, as a social class, they collectively may be surrounded by considerable socio-political power, which is wielded by self-appointed spokespeople and "allies" who do not always have the best interests of the victim class at heart, and may even be competing with each other at cross-purposes, for dominance within the political sphere of issues surrounding that class, and at the class's expense.

== Historical and sociological examples ==
- George Gascoigne in his eye witness account of the Spanish sack of Antwerp described what he called "these outrages and disordered cruelties...Rapes, spoyles, Incests, and Sacriledges".
- Kate Fox in her anthropology of the English observed that drunkenness came with a standardised set of outrages to perform, ranging from swearing and scuffling up to mooning. She also noted how “the English take great pleasure in being shocked and outraged, and righteous indignation is one of our favourite national pastimes, but the feelings expressed are nonetheless genuine”.

== Literary examples ==
- At the climax of The Libation Bearers, Orestes, murderously confronting his mother over her murder of his father, exclaims "You killed and it was outrage – suffer outrage now".

== See also ==
- Emotion
- Indignation
- Moral panic
- Morality
- Norm (social)
- Outrage porn
- Righteous indignation
- Social emotions
- Social order
- Taboo
