= Outrage porn =

Media designed to evoke outrage for online attention

Rage baiting, outrage porn, etc. involve media broadcast of content designed to manipulate increased viewer engagement, often by provoking negative emotional responses aligned with political or other narratives.

Outrage porn (also called outrage discourse, outrage media and outrage journalism) is any type of media or narrative designed to use outrage to provoke strong emotional reactions for the purpose of expanding audiences or increasing engagement. The term outrage porn was coined in 2009 by The New York Times political cartoonist and essayist Tim Kreider.

== Overview ==
Outrage porn is a term used to explain media that is created specifically to provoke anger or outrage among its consumers as a tool of the outrage industrial complex. It is characterized by insincere rage, umbrage and indignation without personal accountability or commitment. Media outlets are often incentivized to feign or foster outrage as it leads to increased page views, sharing, and comments, which are all lucrative online behaviors. Salon, Gawker, and affiliated websites Valleywag and Jezebel have been noted for abusing the tactic. Traditional media outlets, including television news and talk radio outlets have also been characterised as being engaged in outrage media.

The term was first attributed to Tim Kreider in a New York Times article in July 2009, where Kreider said: "It sometimes seems as if most of the news consists of outrage porn, selected specifically to pander to our impulses to judge and punish and get us all riled up with righteous indignation," though he also made a distinction between authentic outrage and outrage porn: "I'm not saying that all outrage is inherently irrational...outrage is healthy to the extent that it causes us to act against injustice."

The term has also been frequently used by Observer media critic Ryan Holiday. In his 2012 book Trust Me, I'm Lying, Holiday described outrage porn as a "better term" for a "manufactured online controversy," because "people like getting pissed off almost as much as they like actual porn."

== Research ==
Tufts University professors Jeffrey Berry and Sarah Sobieraj characterised outrage media as both a genre and a style of discourse, both of which attempt to provoke emotional responses such as anger, fear, and moral indignation through tactics such as overgeneralisation, sensationalism, misleading or false information, and ad hominem attacks. They also characterised it as being personality-centered and reactive (responding to already-reported news rather than breaking stories of its own). In their 2009 study of political media in the United States, they found outrage journalism to be widespread, with 90 percent of all content analyzed including at least one example of it; and concluded that "the aggregate audience for outrage media is immense."

In 2014, Jonah Berger, a professor of marketing at the Wharton School of the University of Pennsylvania, conducted a study on the spread of emotions via social media and concluded that "anger is a high-arousal emotion, which drives people to take action... It makes you feel fired up, which makes you more likely to pass things on." Additionally, online audiences may be susceptible to outrage porn in part because of their feeling of powerlessness toward managers, politicians, creditors, and celebrities.

== Criticism as counterproductive ==
According to Howard Kurtz, outrage porn draws attention from more important issues, which become lost in the noise.

== See also ==
- Call-out culture
- Concern troll
- Milkshake Duck
- Moral panic
- Online shaming
- Rage-baiting
- Sensationalism
- Tabloid journalism
- Trolling

== Bibliography ==
- Berry, Jeffrey M.; Sobieraj, Sarah (2014). The Outrage Industry: Political Opinion Media and the New Incivility (e-book ed.). New York, NY: Oxford University Press. ISBN 978-0199928972.
- Davis, Michael (1992). "The role of the amygdala in fear and anxiety". Annual Review of Neuroscience. 15: 353–375. doi:10.1146/annurev.ne.15.030192.002033. PMID 1575447.
- Hendricks, LaVelle (2013). "The Effects of Anger on the Brain and Body". National Forum Journal of Counseling and Addiction. 2 (1).
- Scott, Manda (2017). "Whispering to the Amygdala – The Role of Language, Frame and Narrative in the Process of Transition" (PDF). Schumacher College Dissertations. Schumacher College, University of Plymouth. Archived from the original (PDF) on January 16, 2021.
- Smith, Tobin (2019). Foxocracy: Inside the Network's Playbook of Tribal Warfare (e-book ed.). Diversion Books. ISBN 978-1635766622. (Page numbers cited correspond to the ePub edition.)
- Sobieraj, Sarah; Berry, Jeffrey M. (2011). "From Incivility to Outrage: Political Discourse in Blogs, Talk Radio, and Cable News". Political Communication. 28 (1): 19–41. doi:10.1080/10584609.2010.542360. S2CID 143739086.
