= Chumbox =

Form of online advertising

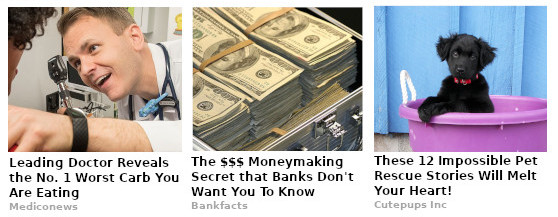
Fictional examples of chumbox-style thumbnails and captions

A chumbox is a form of online advertising that uses a grid of thumbnails and captions to drive traffic to other sites and webpages. This form of advertising is often associated with low-quality clickbait links and articles. The term derives from the fishing practice of "chumming", the use of fish meat as a lure for fish.

== Description ==
A chumbox is a form of advertising associated with outlandish clickbait headlines and low-quality links. In John Mahoney's 2015 article in The Awl which popularized the term, he includes a "taxonomy" of themes regularly featured in chumboxes' images and titles:

- A "Sexy Thing" featuring images of women or headlines alluding to sex scandals, usually in conjunction with the "Localized Rule" (geotargeted headlines)
- Beauty, health, and medicine (or alternative medicine), such as a "Skin Thing", "A Pill", "Weight Loss Thing", or "Miracle Cure Thing"
- Unusual or disturbing imagery, such as a "Deeply Psychological Body Thing", "Weird Tattoo", "Extreme Body Thing", or "Disgusting Invertebrate or Globular Mass Presented as Weird Food"
- Standard tabloid journalism topics, such as a "Celebrity Thing" or "Money Thing"
- "Old Person's Face," used to advertise to older readers and often combined with other themes, such an anti-aging "Skin Thing" or retirement fund "Money Thing"

Chumbox ads typically promise easy solutions to complex medical or financial problems, use sensationalist language like "one weird trick" and "Prepare to be shocked!", or allege that the government or powerful industries "don't want you to know" about their products. For example, a chumbox ad for a folk remedy may claim it was invented by a stay-at-home mom using household spices, it completely cures diabetes in 30 days, and Big Pharma is trying to cover up its existence. To further the appearance that their products are created by normal people and industry outsiders, ads may intentionally use poor graphic design and appear unprofessional.

Publishers often include chumboxes on news websites because the companies behind chumboxes provide a very reliable source of revenue. They often have the label "Around the Web" on top of them, and are designed to appear like news articles and "related stories" to seem more trustworthy to readers, though sometimes, they may also include legitimate links to other news articles on the same host site. The content analyst Ranjan Roy surveyed what types of sites chumbox links redirect to, including Yahoo search result pages, deceptive affiliate marketers, advertisement-heavy slideshows on celebrity tabloid sites, subdomains of authoritative-sounding websites such as Investing.com or Bloomberg News, and occasionally, legitimate products by advertisers. Chumboxes may sell products that require buyers to watch long, unskippable video advertisements first, which may be done to weed out skeptics and less gullible buyers.

In 2018, the Reply All podcast investigated the chumbox after a listener asked the show for help. A photo of the listener and his wife, who had died roughly a decade earlier, had originally been shared on a blog documenting his grief and gone mildly viral; years later, the same photo began resurfacing repeatedly in chumbox ads across many different websites without his consent. The hosts traced how the image had ended up being reused this way by chumbox advertisers. When co-host Alex Goldman visited the offices of Taboola, one of the leading chumbox providers, their CEO and founder, Adam Singolda told him that he had never heard the word chumbox and instead called their advertisements "recommendations".

== History ==
While earlier uses exist, the term chumbox—from chum, or fish bait—was popularized by a 2015 article in The Awl written by John Mahoney. In the early 2010s, the web advertising companies Outbrain and Taboola emerged as the leading providers and chumbox advertisements became ubiquitous on news websites, including on outlets such as CNN, Fox News and MSNBC. By 2016, chumboxes were present on 41 of the top 50 news websites.

By mid-to-late 2016, some websites were rethinking the use of chumboxes due to the negative effect such low-quality links and content had on their brands, despite the additional income from such links. An analysis of images used in advertising of the kind found that 26 percent used sexually suggestive or "interruptive" images; often the ads had no relation to the article content, and on occasions were inappropriate or offensive, such as one titled "Meet the Women Making Rape Jokes That Are Actually Funny," placed under an article about teenage rape.

ChangeAdvertising.org's "Clickbait Report" analysed 50 high-rank news sites and found that over 80 percent were using such ads, the majority from Taboola or Outbrain. Many were found to be confusing or misleading in their purpose.

Microsoft has been criticized for inserting chumboxes inside versions of Windows and Microsoft Edge, showing "tabloid news" content in search or on the desktop.
