= Native advertising =

Type of paid advertising

Native advertising, also called sponsored content, partner content, and branded journalism, is a type of paid advertising that appears in the style and format of the content near the advertisement's placement. It manifests as a post, image, video, article or editorial piece of content. In some cases, it functions like an advertorial. The word native refers to the coherence of the content with the other media that appear on the platform.

These ads reduce a consumer's ad recognition by blending the ad into the native content of the platform, even if it is labeled as "sponsored" or "branded" content. Readers may have difficulty immediately identifying them as advertisements due to their ambiguous nature, especially when deceptive labels such as "From around the web" are used. Since the early 2000s, the US FTC has required content that is paid for by advertisers and not created by the publisher as content to be labeled. There are different terms advertisers can use but in all cases the ad content must be clearly labeled as ad. According to the FTC: "The listings should be clearly labeled as such using terms conveying that the rank is paid for."

Some studies have linked native advertising to ad-evoked effects, such as increased attention to an ad, reduced ad avoidance, increased purchase intention, and favorable attitude toward a brand. These types of integrated advertisements allow businesses to be associated with content that is already being consumed.

Product placement (embedded marketing) is a precursor to native advertising. The former places the product within the content, whereas in native marketing, which is legally permissible in the US to the extent that there is sufficient disclosure, the product and content are merged.

== Forms ==
Contemporary formats for native advertising now include promoted videos, images, articles, commentary, music, and other various forms of media. A majority of these methods for delivering the native strategy have been relegated to an online presence, where it is most commonly employed as publisher-produced brand content, a similar concept to the traditional advertorial. Alternative examples of modern technique include search advertising, when ads appear alongside search results that qualify as native to the search experience. Popular examples include Twitter's promoted Tweets, Facebook's promoted stories, and Tumblr's promoted posts. The most traditionally influenced form of native marketing manifests as the placement of sponsor-funded content alongside editorial content, or showing "other content you might be interested in" which is sponsored by a marketer alongside editorial recommendations.

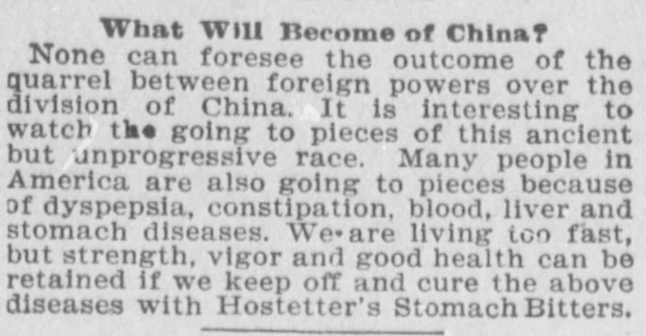
This 1901 advertisement for patent medicine presents itself as an editorial on political developments in China.

Most recently, controversy has arisen as to whether content marketing is a form of native marketing, or if they are inherently separate ideologies and styles, with native market strategists claiming that they utilize content marketing techniques, and some content market strategists claiming not to be a form of native marketing.

== Sponsored content ==
U.S. native advertising spending reached $98.6 billion in 2023, accounting for more than 59% of all U.S. digital display ad spending. The production of sponsored content (sometimes abbreviated as "sponcon") involves inclusion of a third party along with a management company or a brand company's personal relations and promotional activities team in reaching out to aforementioned considerably popular third party content producers on social media, often independent, deemed "influencers" in an attempt to promote a product. Often quoted as the predecessor to traditional endorsed and/or contract advertising; which would instead be featuring celebrities, sponsored content has indubitably become more and more popular on social media platforms in recent years likely due to their cost-effectiveness, time efficiency, as well as the ability to receive instant feedback on the marketability of a product or service.

A technique often used in traditional sponsored advertising is direct and indirect product placement (embedded marketing). Instead of embedded marketing's technique of placing the product within the content, in native marketing, the product and content are merged, and in sponsored content the product, content and active promotion occurs simultaneously across a number of platforms.

Unlike traditional forms of native advertising, sponsored content alludes to requirement of and desire for transparency and thrives on the concept of preexisting and/or built up trust between consumer and content producer rather than creating a masked net impression, which is a reasonable consumer's understanding of an advertisement. The underlying motives of sponsored content, however, is similar to that of native advertising- which is to inhibit a consumers' ad recognition by blending the ad into the native content of the platform, making many consumers unaware they are looking at an ad to begin with. The sponsored content on social media, like any other type of native advertising, can be difficult to be properly identified by the Federal Trade Commission because of its ambiguous nature. Native advertising frequently bypasses this net impression standard, which makes it problematic.

=== Categories of sponsored content ===
==== Sponsored videos ====
Sponsored videos involve the content producer/influencer including or mentioning the service/product for a particular amount of time within their video. This type of sponsorship is evident across all genres and levels of production regarding video content. There is a history of trouble between content producers and their transparency of sponsors regarding endorsement guidelines set by the Federal Trades Commission. Most sponsored videos include a brief or a contract and can vary from client to client and affects the nature of promotion of the product as well as specific requirements such as length of the promotion period. Notable companies involved in this trade include Audible, Squarespace, Crunchyroll and Vanity Planet.

==== Sponsored social media posts ====
Sponsored social media posts usually consist of the content producer/influencer including or mentioning the service/product for a particular amount of time within a single or series of social media posts. Most sponsored posts include a brief or a contract and can vary from client to client. Notable companies involved in this trade include fit-tea, sugar bear hair and various diet meal planning services and watch brands.

==== Collaborative content ====
Collaborative content has become more prominent on video platforms and social media in recent years. Content producers/influencers are usually contacted by companies for their creative input and voice in the makings of a product or provided with a discount code to gain a percentage of the profits after consumers incorporate the code as a part their purchase. Collaborative content may also include a brief or a contract and can vary from client to client- however, there is a degree of flexibility as the finished product is supposedly a representation of the content producer. Notable companies involved in this trade include pixi, colourpop and MAC cosmetics.

== Advertising disclosure ==
As it is the nature of disguised advertising to blend with its surroundings, a clear disclosure is deemed necessary when employing native marketing strategy in order to protect the consumer from being deceived, and to assist audiences in distinguishing between sponsored and regular content. According to the Federal Trade Commission, means of disclosure include visual cues, labels, and other techniques.

The most common practices of these are recognizable by understated labels, such as “Advertisement”, “Ad”, “Promoted”, “Sponsored”, “Featured Partner”, or “Suggested Post” in subtitles, corners, or the bottoms of ads. A widespread tendency in such measures is to mention the brand name of the sponsor, as in “Promoted by [brand]”, “Sponsored by [brand]”, or “Presented by [brand]”. These can vary drastically due to the publisher's choice of disclosure language (i.e., wording used to identify native advertising placement).

In 2009, the Federal Trade Commission released their Endorsement Guideline specifically to increase consumer awareness of endorsements and testimonials in advertising given the rise in popularity of social media and blogging. The American Society of Magazine Editors (ASME) released updated guidelines in 2015 reaffirming the need of publishers to distinguish editorial and advertising content. The ASME approach recommends both labels to disclose commercial sponsorship and in-content visual evidence to help the user distinguish native advertising from editorial.

A study published by University of California researchers found that even labeled native advertising deceived about a quarter of survey research subjects. In the study, 27% of respondents thought that journalists or editors wrote an advertorial for diet pills, despite the presence of the "Sponsored Content" label. Because the Federal Trade Commission can bring cases concerning practices that mislead a substantial minority of consumers, the authors conclude that many native advertising campaigns are probably deceptive under federal law.

The authors also explain two theories of why native advertising is deceptive. First, the schema theory suggests that advertorials mislead by causing consumers not to trigger their innate skepticism to advertising. Second, advertorials also cause source-based misleadingness problems by imbuing advertising material with the authority normally assigned to editorial content. Recognition percentages remain low even as native advertising has expanded in pervasiveness. An academic article published in 2017 has shown that only 17% of participants could identify native advertising and even if readers were primed, that number only increased to 27%. Moreover, when readers learned about covert advertising, their perceptions of the publications declined.

== Categories of online ads ==
The Interactive Advertising Bureau (IAB), the primary organization responsible for developing ad industry standards and conducting business research, published a report in 2013 detailing six different categories for differentiating types of native advertisements.

1. In-Feed ad units: As the name denotes, In-Feed ads are units located within the website's normal content feed, meaning they appear as if the content may have been written by or in partnership with the publisher's team to match the surrounding stories. A category that rose to popularity through sites like Upworthy and BuzzFeed's sponsored articles due to its effectiveness, In-Feed has also been the source of controversy for native marketing, as it is here the distinction between native and content marketing is typically asserted.
2. Search ads: Appearing in the list of search results, these are generally found above or below the organic search results or in favorable position, having been sold to advertisers with a guarantee for optimal placement on the search engine page. They usually possess a similar appearance as the organic results on the page with the exception of disclosure aspects.
3. Recommendation widgets: Although these ads are part of the content of the site, these do not tend to appear in like manner to the content of the editorial feed. Typically delivered through a widget, recommendation ads are generally recognizable by words which imply external reference, suggestions, and tangentially related topics. "You might also like"; "You might like"; “Elsewhere from around the web"; "From around the web"; "You may have missed", or "Recommended for you" typically characterize these units.
4. Promoted listings: Usually featured on websites that are not content based, such as e-commerce sites, promoted listings are presented in identical fashion with the products or services offered on the given site. Similarly justified as search ads, sponsored products are considered native to the experience in much the same way as search ads.
5. In-ad (IAB standard): An In-Ad fits in a standard IAB container found outside the feed, containing "...contextually relevant content within the ad, links to an offsite page, has been sold with a guaranteed placement, and is measured on brand metrics such as interaction and brand lift."
6. Custom / can't be contained: This category is left for the odd ends and ads that do not conform to any of the other content categories.

== Digital platforms ==
Native advertising platforms are classified into two categories, commonly referred to as "open" and "closed" platforms, but hybrid options are also utilized with some frequency.

Closed platforms are formats created by brands for the purpose of promoting their own content intrinsically on their websites. Advertisements seen on these platforms will not be seen on others, as these ad types are generated for its sole use, and structured around exhibiting ad units within the confines of the website's specific agendas. Namely, advertisements distributed on closed platforms originate from the platform's brand itself. Popular examples include Promoted Tweets on Twitter, Sponsored Stories on Facebook, and TrueView Video Ads on YouTube.

Open platforms are defined by the promotion of the same piece of branded content across multiple platforms ubiquitously, but through some variation of native ad formats. Unlike closed platforms, the content itself lives outside any given website that it appears on, and is usually distributed across multiple sites by a third-party company, meaning that the advertisements appearing on open platforms namely are placed there by an advertiser. Two prominent platforms that use this open model are Taboola and Outbrain.

Hybrid platforms allow the content publishing platforms to install a private marketplace where advertisers have the option to bid on the inventory of ad space either through direct sales or programmatic auction through what is known as real-time bidding (RTB). Therefore, advertisements distributed on hybrid platforms are placed there by the platform itself, the space having been sold to an open platform advertiser.

== See also ==
- Advertising management
- Branded content
- Content marketing
- Contextual advertising
- Digital marketing
- Digital promotion
- Integrated marketing communications
- Listicle
- Marketing communications
- Online advertising
- Embedded marketing
