= Natalie Harp =

American political aide (born 1991)

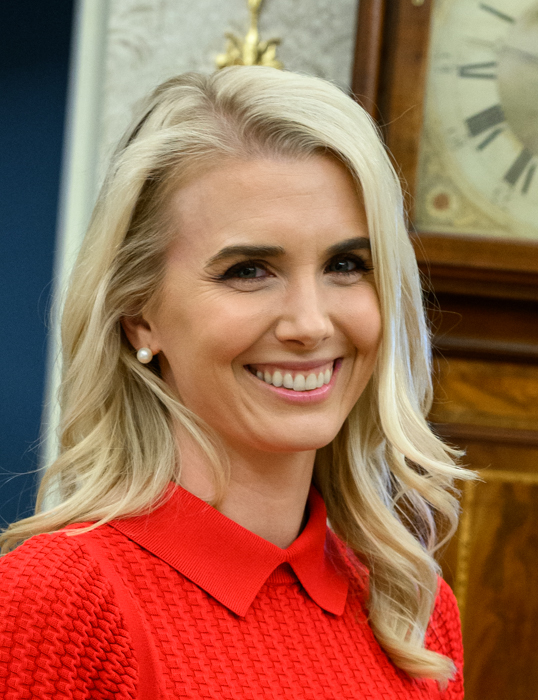
- Harp in 2025

Executive Assistant to the President
- Incumbent
- Assumed office January 20, 2025
- President: Donald Trump

Personal details
- Born: 1991 (age 34–35)
- Party: Republican
- Education: Point Loma Nazarene University (BA); Liberty University (MBA)

Natalie Harp (born 1991) is an American political aide and former television anchor who has served as special assistant and executive assistant to the president of the United States since 2025.

In 2019, Harp received attention after praising President Donald Trump for signing into law a federal right-to-try law which she said had saved her life. Trump invited Harp to serve as a member of the advisory board for his 2020 presidential campaign and to speak at the 2020 Republican National Convention. Harp worked for the far-right television channel One America News Network from 2020 to 2022. She later became an aide to Trump for his 2024 presidential campaign, exerting influence over his social media communications.

In January 2025, Trump appointed Harp to his White House staff. As his assistant, Harp has managed Trump's Truth Social account, and was responsible for several controversial posts on his account. For the first year in the White House, Harp worked without a security clearance.

== Early life and education ==
Natalie Harp was born in 1991, and raised in the neighborhood of Carmel Valley, San Diego, California. She and her older brother, Preston, were homeschooled by their mother Jill Harp. Harp was previously connected to David Jeremiah and worked in his offices at Shadow Mountain Community Church, and began attending the church as a member when she was 13 years old. Harp's brother Preston, a leftist revolutionary living in Nicaragua, said that their mother taught them American exceptionalism at home, and that his sister would frequently write letters to American presidents prior to Trump, such as George W. Bush when she was 16. She graduated from Point Loma Nazarene University in 2012, and from Liberty University in 2015 with an MBA. She is a devout evangelical Christian. Her father, Robert Harp, died by suicide in July 2020. According to Preston, Harp and their mother intended to cover up the suicide by claiming Robert Harp died in his sleep, leading to Preston's estrangement from the two of them.

== Career ==
=== Trump work and Republican National Committee speech (2019–2020) ===
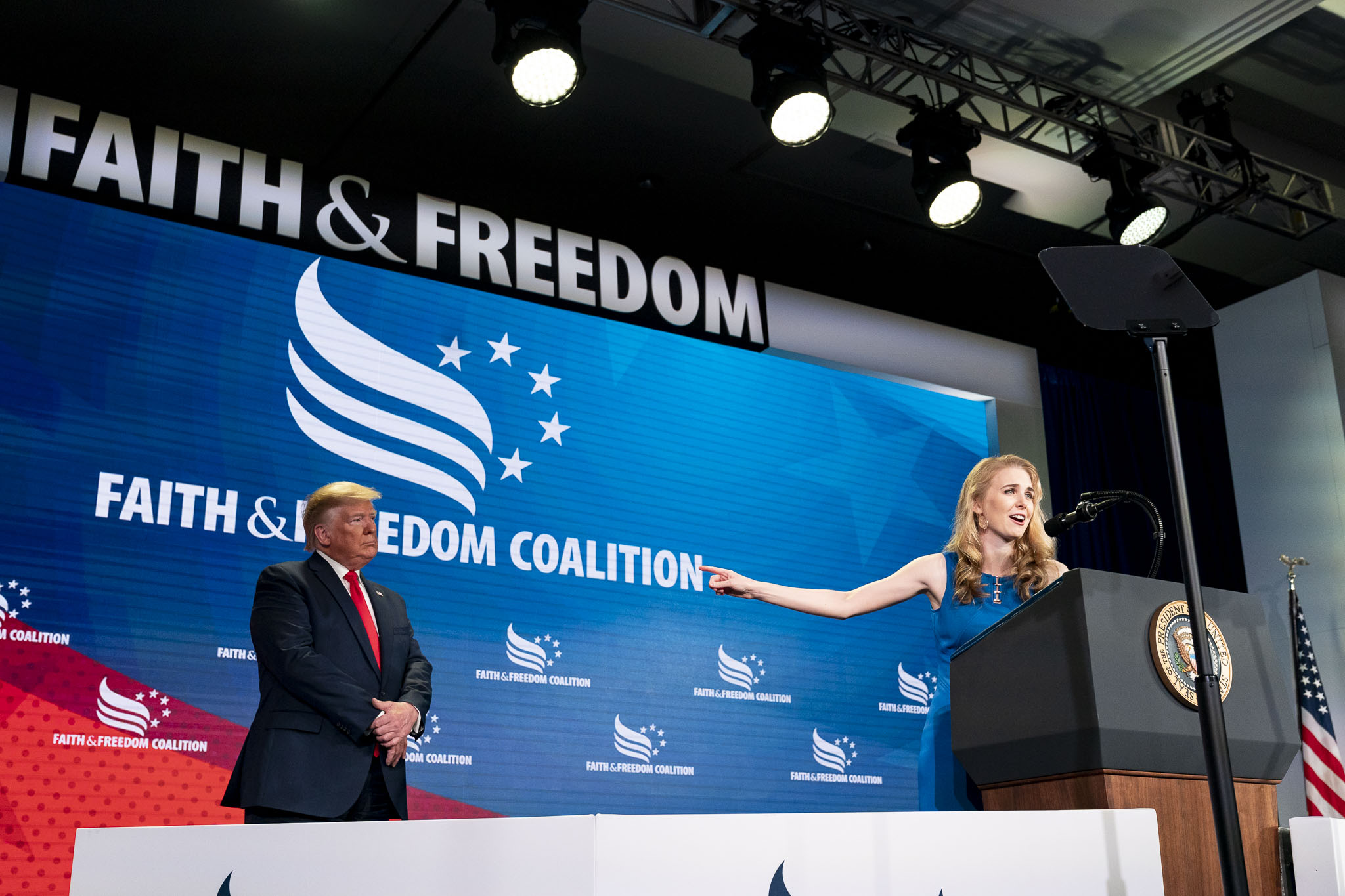
Trump invited Harp to join him on stage during his speech at the 2019 Faith and Freedom Coalition Conference.

By 2017, Harp had become vocally critical of healthcare in the United States after she began suffering from health issues, particularly chronic pain and complications incurred by a medical error involving intravenous therapy for stage II bone cancer. Harp made a post on LinkedIn on June 12, 2019 titled "I'm Living Proof – the Party of Healthcare is Trump's" that resulted in an invitation to appear on Fox News. Two days later, in that appearance, she praised Trump for signing into law a federal right-to-try law that she said allowed her to access experimental treatments which she credited with saving her life. However, The Washington Post cast doubt on Harp's story, citing medical experts who said that the treatment in question was already approved for off-label use and reporting that she had already made public comments about receiving the new treatment two months before the law was signed.

Harp appeared with Trump and spoke at a Faith and Freedom Coalition meeting on June 26, 2019.

Trump invited Harp to speak at the 2020 Republican National Convention held in August 2020. Her speech compared Trump to George Bailey, the protagonist of the film It's a Wonderful Life (1946), leading to criticism from the family of the character's actor, Jimmy Stewart. By August 2020, she had become a member of the advisory board for Trump's 2020 presidential campaign.

=== One America News Network and return to Trump (2020–2024) ===
In 2020, Harp began working as an anchor for One America News Network (OANN), a far-right television channel, promoting false claims of fraud in the 2020 presidential election. Harp reportedly said that she fully supported conspiracy theories related to attempts to overturn the 2020 election and believed that Trump defeated Joe Biden. On January 6, 2021, the day of the attack on the US Capitol, she posted 150 pro-Trump messages to an account on X. They included remarks such as "FIGHT FOR TRUMP!", "today we STOP THE STEAL!", and "We will never give up. We will never concede." The account has since been deactivated.

In April 2022, Harp left OANN amid an exodus after DirecTV refused to carry the channel. Months later, she became an aide for Trump in his 2024 presidential campaign. She often accompanied Trump when he played golf, bringing a laptop and a printer to show him articles and social media posts. Harp's frequent use of a printer, which accommodated Trump's preference for hard copies, led to her being referred to as the "human printer" by associates and members of the press, a reference to her role printing out flattering social media posts and positive news articles about Trump, and bringing them to his attention throughout the day.

Harp has posted to Truth Social on Trump's behalf, including a post that announced he had received a target letter in the election obstruction case, surprising other aides. In May 2024, an unidentified staffer used Trump's account to repost a video of faux newspaper headlines which hypothesized a Trump victory and included the term "Unified Reich". According to The Bulwark, that staffer was Harp.

Aides who spoke to The New York Times called Harp a "conduit" and an "instant enabler of his impulses". In his book All or Nothing (2025), the journalist Michael Wolff described Harp as a "gatekeeper". Harp's access to Trump allowed people to send her damaging clips of their rivals. Some White House aides attributed Trump's relationship with Harp to her decision to remain loyal to him after the January 6 Capitol attack. She also served as an avenue for the far-right political activist and conspiracy theorist Laura Loomer to influence Trump. Harp provided Trump with an image of him wielding a baseball bat near Manhattan district attorney Alvin Bragg's head in advance of Trump's indictment by Bragg in March 2023. In August 2024, The New York Times reported that Trump had directed Harp to send angry text messages in his name to Miriam Adelson, a major campaign donor, the previous month, nearly costing Adelson's support.

=== Executive assistant to the President (2025–present) ===
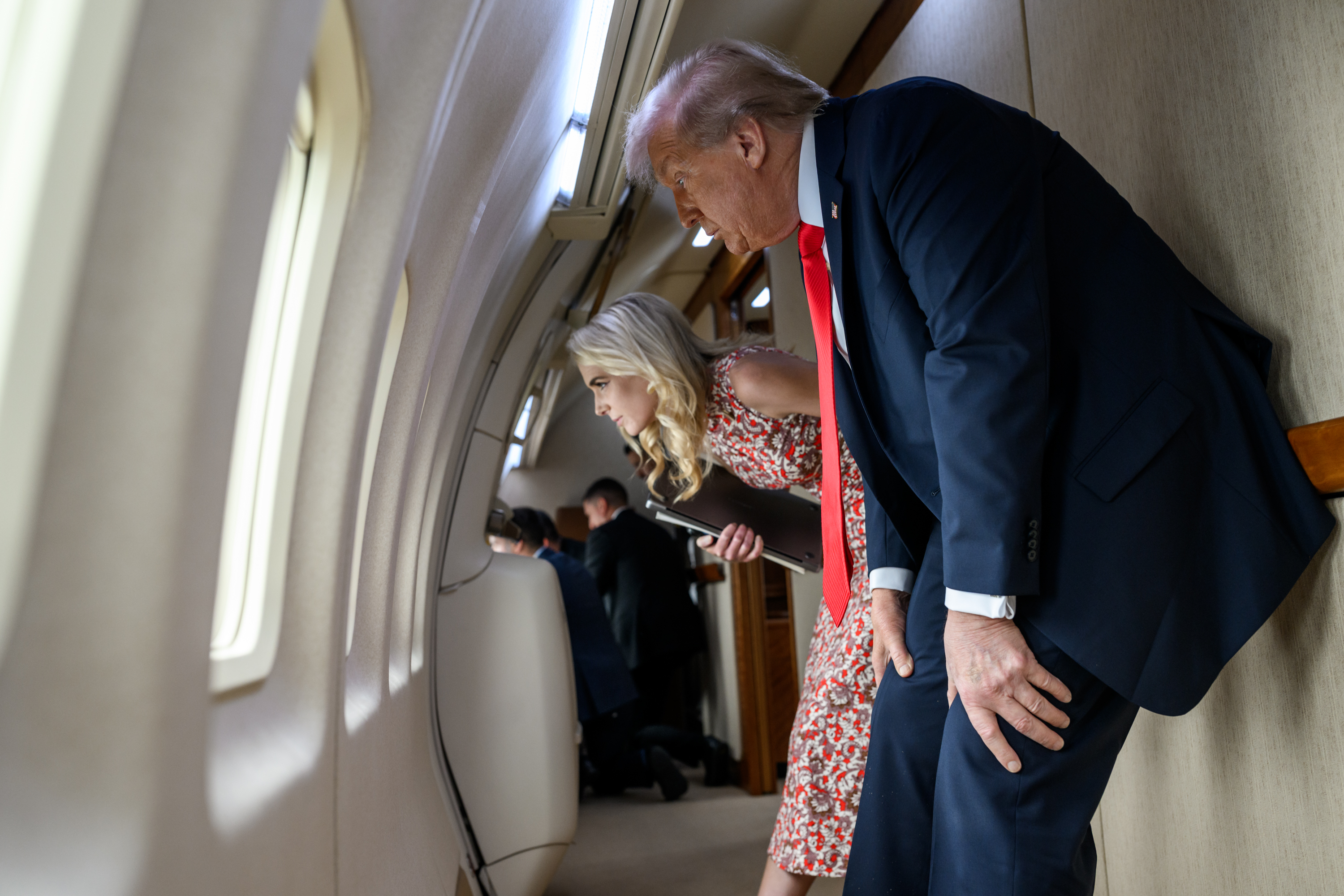
Trump and Harp traveling to watch the 2025 US Open – Men's singles

In November 2024, after Trump won the 2024 presidential election, The New York Times wrote that Harp was set to serve in his administration. That month, she posted a message sent to Trump by Ukrainian president Volodymyr Zelenskyy that was intended to be private. In January 2025, Trump appointed Harp to the position of special assistant to the President and executive assistant to the President, with a government salary of US$150,000. One White House staff member said that she "plays into the less productive and more troublesome parts of his nature, putting things in front of him that aren't vetted".

Harp continued to take dictation of social media posts for Trump, and according to the book Regime Change, Dan Scavino, who had handled Trump's social media accounts, largely gave control of Trump's Truth Social account to Harp. In early 2026, she was responsible for posting a video that included a racist depiction of Barack and Michelle Obama as apes, and for posting an AI-generated image that appeared to show Trump dressed in clothes and utilizing powers that are associated with Jesus.

During the 2026 alleged Iranian plot to assassinate Donald Trump, Harp was described by the Times as among the "lucky few" who were evacuated from Air Force One in secret via a cargo food container. The Washington Post reported that Harp was among a handful of close aides who accompanied Trump and Defense Secretary Pete Hegseth onto a second airplane. Other senior government officials and some Cabinet members in the presidential line of succession, including Secretary of State Marco Rubio, were left on the allegedly targeted decoy flight.

Harp's presence on the plane was noted by Georgia Democratic senator Jon Ossoff in a criticism of Trump and his administration at a campaign rally held in Atlanta; while criticizing Trump's inaction during office, Ossoff said, "He doesn't want to do the job [of President]. He wants to build his ballroom and travel with Natalie on their apparently-defenseless flying palace gifted by the Emir of Qatar". The portion of the speech went viral, and brought attention to Harp. When questioned by CNN's Kristen Holmes about the remark, Trump lashed out at her for asking the question.

Some White House aides and political allies began what was described in The Atlantic as "all-out shielding of Harp".

=== Security clearance refusal ===
Harp worked in close proximity to Trump and other national security figures for over one year without any security clearance vetting, inspection or review. It is unknown why Harp refused to comply with security review or apply for her clearance.

The New Republic reported that Trump himself was ultimately "forced to personally intervene", following which Harp initiated a background check and received her security clearance. One national security official warned that her close proximity gave her access to more sensitive information than any other of Trump's associates.

== Relationship with Donald Trump ==
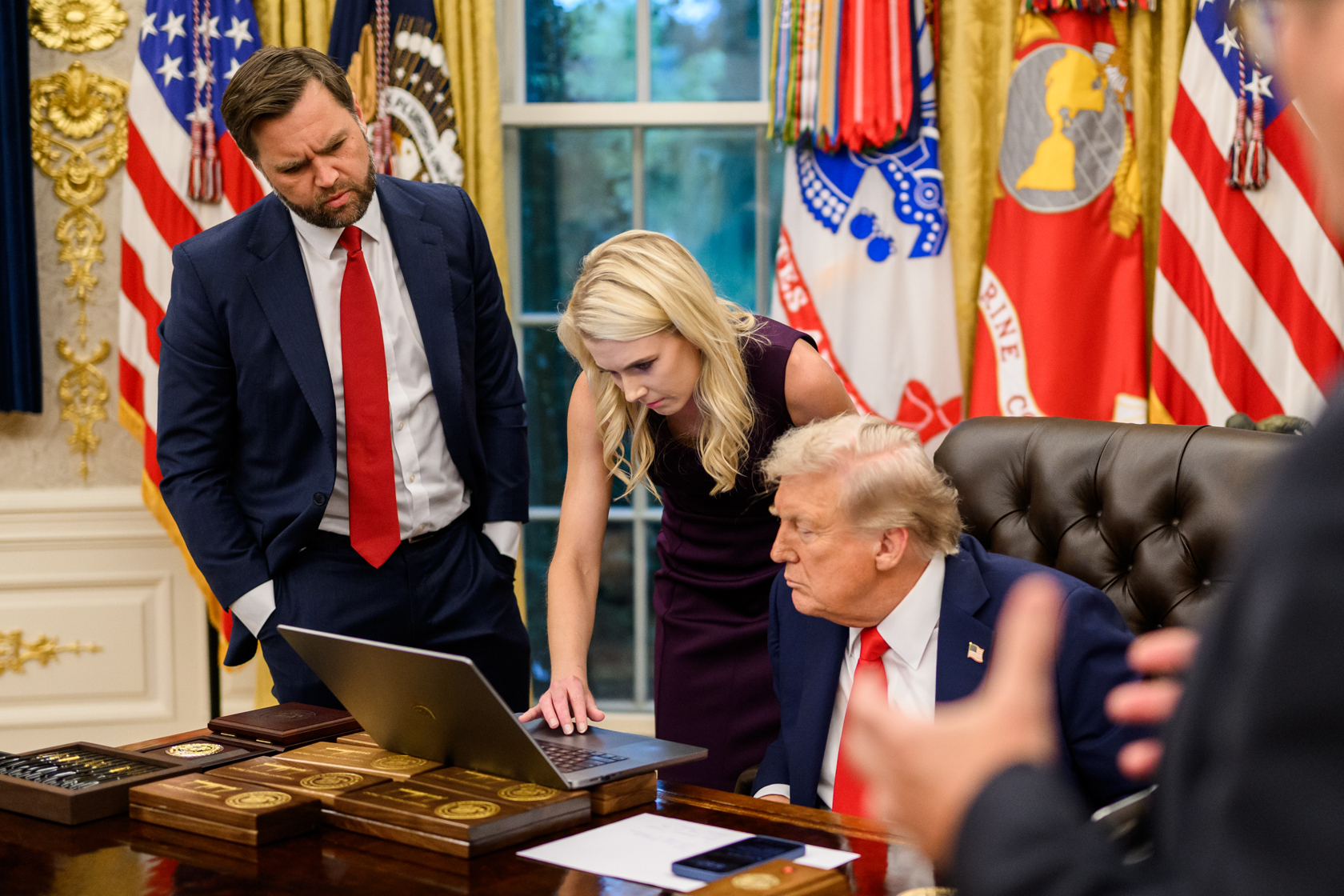
Harp, with JD Vance and Donald Trump, in the Oval Office in 2025

Donald Trump remarked that Harp was the only aide who cared about him after his arraignment in connection with the Georgia election racketeering prosecution, according to the Times. The paper additionally reported on a series of letters Harp sent Trump in 2023 that unnerved people in Trump's inner circle, citing phrases such as "You are all that matters to me", "I want to bring you joy", and "Guardian and Protector in this Life". The Guardian described the letters as "intensely affectionate". Harp does not take any days off from her role with Trump and is by his side daily. Her displays of devotion to Trump concerned some White House staff.

According to the journalist Alex Isenstadt, in one instance, Trump's wife, Melania, discovered Harp in his private quarters, an area reserved for the Trump family, working with him at night. In Regime Change: Inside the Imperial Presidency of Donald Trump, Maggie Haberman and Jonathan Swan reported that Trump had described Harp as the "only one who loves him as much as his wife and children", and that she "will never leave him".

CNN reported that in one letter, Harp wrote to Trump, "You have the absolute right to cuss me out, if need be, when I deserve it, because no one knows or cares about me more."

In October 2023, when Trump visited New York City to appear in court in connection with the business fraud lawsuit against the Trump Organization, Harp chose to stow herself in the trunk of an SUV of Trump's motorcade, when there were no more seats available, in order "not to be left behind", following a "screaming match" between Harp and other staffers in the lobby of Trump Tower, according to CNN. Harp was recorded sprinting across the grounds of Trump International Golf Links Scotland to keep up with the President in his golf cart; she sent him a letter in response to her actions apologizing for having caused any embarrassment. She said in it that she was distracted that week and had been "forgetting to eat" and sleep. Harp has compared Trump to the Good Samaritan. Financial disclosure forms showed that Trump gave Harp and two other female aides each a $45,000 cash gift as a holiday bonus in 2025. The White House denied that the bonuses, which amounted to around a third of their salaries, violated any ethics rules.

Staff have tried to discreetly isolate Harp from Trump without success, and said she and Trump were unaware of their actions. Increased attention on Harp from news organizations reportedly angered Trump and West Wing aides.

== Personal life ==
In her mid-20s, Harp resided with her parents in Woodbridge, Irvine, California. She underwent chemotherapy for bone cancer in 2018. In 2020, Harp and her mother relocated to West Palm Beach, Florida.

== Works cited ==
- Haberman, Maggie; Swan, Jonathan (2026). Regime Change: Inside the Imperial Presidency of Donald Trump. New York: Simon & Schuster. ISBN 978-1-6680-6724-6.
- Isenstadt, Alex (2025). Revenge: The Inside Story of Trump's Return to Power. New York: Grand Central Publishing. ISBN 978-1-5387-6553-1.
- Wolff, Michael (2025). All or Nothing: How Trump Recaptured America. New York: Crown Publishing Group. ISBN 978-0-5937-3538-1.
