= Perfect Weapon =

Perfect Weapon or The Perfect Weapon may refer to:

- The Perfect Weapon (1991 film), starring Jeff Speakman
- The Perfect Weapon (2016 film), starring Steven Seagal
- The Perfect Weapon (2020 film), a documentary film about cyber warfare
- "Perfect Weapon" (song), a 2010 song by Black Veil Brides
- Perfect Weapon (TV series), a British TV series for National Geographic
- Perfect Weapon (video game), a 1996 video game for Windows and PlayStation
- The Perfect Weapon: War, Sabotage, and Fear in the Cyber Age, a 2018 book by David E. Sanger
- Star Wars: The Perfect Weapon, a 2015 short story in the Journey to Star Wars book series
