= Debbie Dingell =

American politician (born 1953)

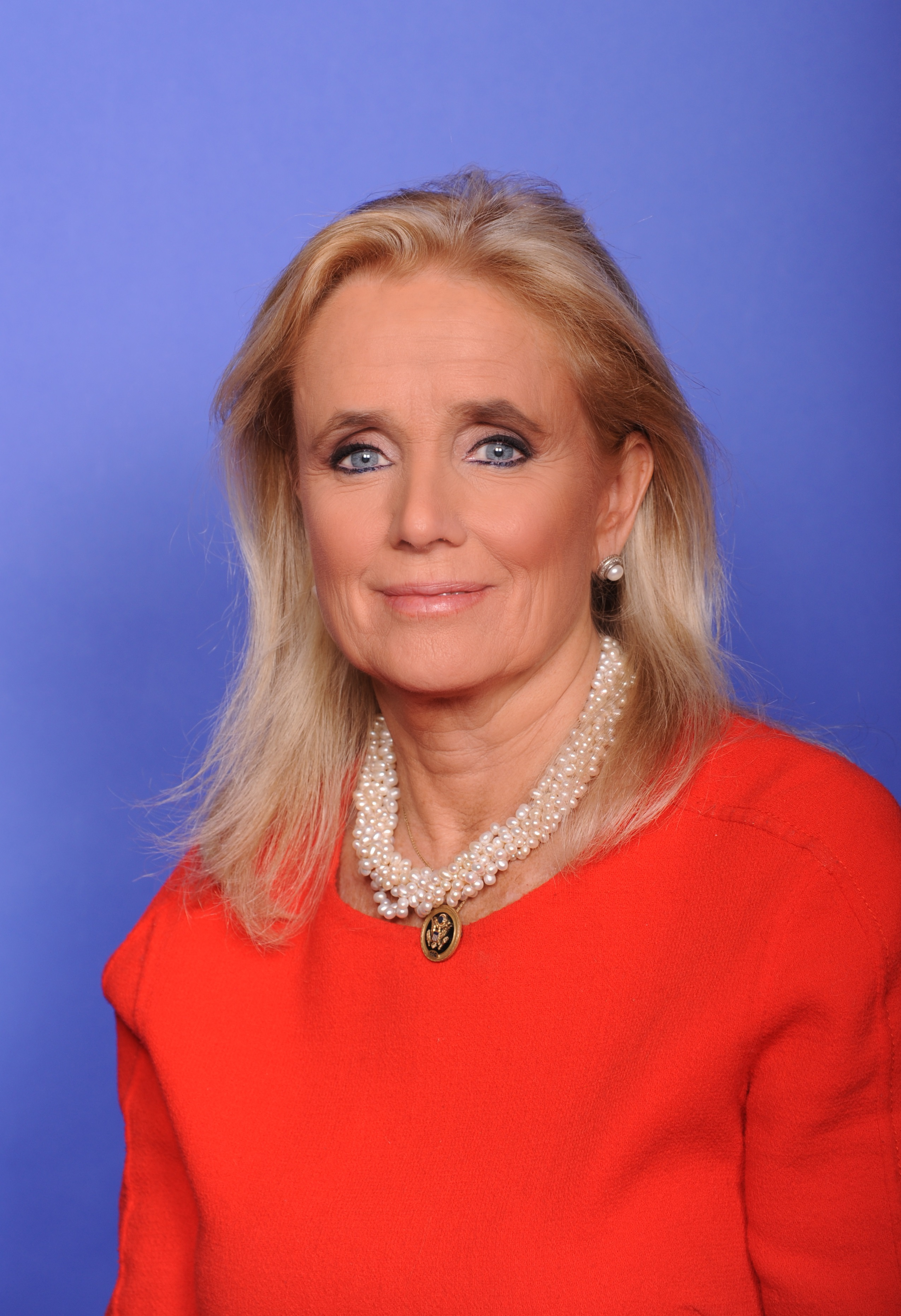
- Official portrait, 2016

Chair of the House Democratic Policy and Communications Committee
- Incumbent
- Assumed office April 16, 2024
- Leader: Hakeem Jeffries
- Preceded by: Joe Neguse

Co-Chair of the House Democratic Policy and Communications Committee
- In office January 3, 2019 – January 3, 2023 Serving with Matt Cartwright, Ted Lieu, and Joe Neguse
- Leader: Nancy Pelosi
- Preceded by: Cheri Bustos; David Cicilline; Hakeem Jeffries
- Succeeded by: Veronica Escobar; Dean Phillips; Lauren Underwood

Member of the U.S. House of Representatives from Michigan
- Incumbent
- Assumed office January 3, 2015
- Preceded by: John Dingell
- Constituency: 12th district (2015–2023); 6th district (2023–present)

Personal details
- Born: Deborah Ann Insley; November 23, 1953 (age 72) Detroit, Michigan, U.S.
- Party: Republican (before 1981); Democratic (1981–present)
- Spouse: John Dingell (m. 1981; died 2019)
- Relatives: John Dingell Sr. (father-in-law)
- Education: Georgetown University (BS, MS)
- Website: House website Campaign website
- Dingell's voice Dingell supporting the National Resources Management Act of 2019. Recorded February 26, 2019

Deborah Ann Dingell (/ˈdɪŋɡəl/ DING-gəl; née Insley; November 23, 1953) is an American politician serving as a U.S. representative from Michigan since 2015, representing the state's 6th congressional district since 2023. A member of the Democratic Party, she succeeded her late husband, John Dingell, who was the longest-serving member of Congress in U.S. history.

Dingell is active in several organizations in Michigan and Washington, D.C., and serves on a number of boards. She is a founder and past chair of the National Women's Health Resource Center and the Children's Inn at the National Institutes of Health (NIH). She is also a member of the board of directors for Vital Voices Global Partnership. She is a 1975 graduate of the Edmund A. Walsh School of Foreign Service at Georgetown University.

She worked as a consultant to the American Automobile Policy Council. She was a superdelegate for the 2012 Democratic National Convention in Charlotte, North Carolina.

== Life and career ==
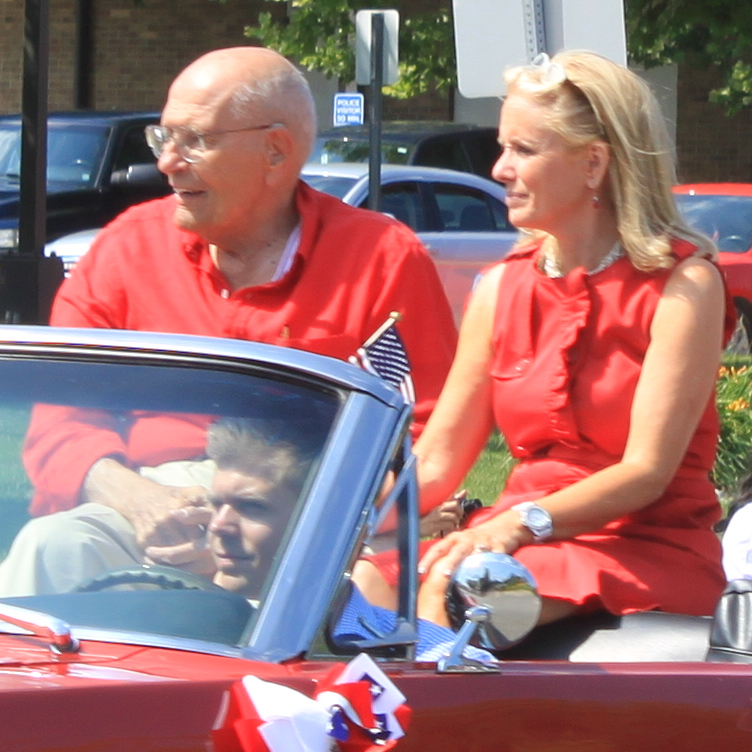
Dingell with her husband John in 2011

Descended from Howard Fisher of the Fisher Brothers, owners of Fisher Body, from 1919 a part of General Motors, she has served as president of the General Motors Foundation and as executive director of global community relations and government relations at GM.

She married Representative John Dingell in 1981. She had grown up as a Republican, but became a Democrat soon after marrying Dingell. Their marriage lasted 38 years until her husband's death on February 7, 2019, at the age of 92. Like her husband, she is a Catholic.

She is a member of the Democratic National Committee from Michigan and chaired Vice President Al Gore's campaign in Michigan in 2000. In 2004, she also helped secure the Michigan Democratic primary and general election vote for John Kerry in Michigan.

In November 2006, Dingell was elected to Wayne State University's board of governors.

Dingell and Senator Carl Levin were proponents of moving up Michigan's presidential primary before February 5 in an attempt to garner greater political influence for Michigan during the 2008 Democratic primaries. This resulted in Michigan almost losing its delegates' votes in the Democratic National Convention.

When Carl Levin announced his retirement from the U.S. Senate at the end of his term in 2015, Dingell indicated that she was interested in running for his seat. When former Michigan Governor Jennifer Granholm declined to run for the seat, a Politico writer declared Dingell to be one of the front-runners for the Democratic nomination, alongside Representative Gary Peters. She chose not to run, and Peters won the seat.

== U.S. House of Representatives ==
=== Elections ===
==== 2014 ====
Dingell indicated that she planned to run for her husband's congressional seat after he announced his retirement. On August 5, she won the Democratic primary, winning 77.7% of the vote against Raymond Mullins. On November 4, she won the general election, defeating Republican Terry Bowman with 65.0% of the vote.

When Dingell was sworn in, she became the first U.S. non-widowed woman in Congress to succeed her husband. His father, John Dingell Sr., held Michigan's 12th district for 22 years before his son won it. Altogether, the Dingells had represented this district, numbered as the 15th from 1933 to 1965, the 16th from 1965 to 2003, the 15th again from 2003 to 2013, and the 12th from 2013 to 2023, since 1932.

==== 2016 ====
Dingell did not face a primary challenger in 2016. She was reelected with 64.3% of the vote, defeating Republican Jeff Jones and four third-party candidates.

==== 2018 ====
Dingell did not face a primary challenger in 2018. She was reelected with 68.1% of the vote in a rematch against Republican Jeff Jones and two third-party candidates.

==== 2020 ====
Dingell was challenged in the Democratic primary by medical student and activist Solomon Rajput. She won renomination with 80.9% of the vote. In the general election, she was reelected with 68.1% of the vote in another rematch against Republican Jeff Jones and Working Class Party candidate Gary Walkowicz.

==== 2022 ====
The 12th congressional district shifted significantly in the 2020 United States redistricting cycle following the 2020 census: while it kept Dearborn, it lost Ann Arbor while gaining parts of Detroit. While prior to redistricting, Dingell lived in Dearborn, she chose to move to Ann Arbor and run in the new 6th district, which was drawn to contain Washtenaw County and Detroit suburbs in western Wayne County. This allowed Rashida Tlaib, who represented the old 13th district, to run in the new 12th district.

Dingell faced no opposition in the Democratic primary. In the general election, she defeated Republican Whittney Williams with 65.9% of the vote.

==== 2024 ====
Dingell did not face a primary challenger in 2024. She was reelected with 62.0% of the vote, defeating Republican Heather Smiley and two third-party candidates.

==== 2026 ====
Dingell is running for re-election against her 2024 Republican challenger Heather Smiley.

=== Tenure ===
In 2018, Dingell introduced a law that would give the Consumer Product Safety Commission the authority to recall defective firearms. John Dingell was a key lawmaker who initially granted the firearms industry this exemption from the 1972 Consumer Product Safety Act that created the Consumer Product Safety Commission.

In July 2019, Dingell voted against a House resolution introduced by Representative Brad Schneider opposing efforts to boycott the State of Israel and the Global Boycott, Divestment, and Sanctions Movement. The resolution passed 398–17.

In April 2021, Dingell introduced the Recovering America's Wildlife Act of 2021, a bill that would provide funding for conserving and protecting endangered and threatened species, strategies to do so, and wildlife-related recreational activities. The bill passed the House by 230–190 on June 14, 2022.

In 2023, Dingell was among 56 Democrats to vote in favor of H.Con.Res. 21, which directed President Joe Biden to remove U.S. troops from Syria within 180 days.

==== Trump impeachment ====
After Dingell voted to impeach President Donald Trump, Trump attacked Dingell during a campaign rally in Battle Creek, musing that her late husband might be in hell, saying of him, "Maybe he's looking up, I don't know, I don't know, maybe, maybe. But let's assume he's looking down." She was attending a bipartisan Problem Solvers Caucus gathering when she was told of Trump's remarks. Numerous members of both parties came to Dingell's defense. In her response to the incident, Dingell called for a return to civility, saying, "some things should be off limits." In her 2022 book Confidence Man, New York Times reporter Maggie Haberman wrote that Dingell received a call from a man claiming to be a reporter who asked whether she was "looking for an apology from Trump". According to Haberman, "Dingell couldn't shake the idea that his voice sounded like that of the forty-fifth president."

On June 24, 2025, Dingell was one of 128 House Democrats who voted against an impeachment resolution against President Trump over the June 21 U.S attack on Iran's nuclear sites.

=== Committee assignments ===
- Committee on Energy and Commerce
  - Subcommittee on Health
  - Subcommittee on Communications & Technology
  - Subcommittee on Commerce, Manufacturing and Trade
- Committee on Natural Resources
  - Subcommittee on Water, Wildlife, and Fisheries
  - Subcommittee on Energy & Mineral Resources

=== Caucus memberships ===
- Black Maternal Health Caucus
- Congressional Equality Caucus
- Congressional Asian Pacific American Caucus
- Congressional Progressive Caucus
- Congressional Arts Caucus
- Congressional Caucus on Macedonia and Macedonian-Americans
- Congressional Solar Caucus
- Congressional Ukraine Caucus
- Congressional Wildlife Refuge Caucus
- Medicare for All Caucus
- Blue Collar Caucus
- Problem Solvers Caucus
- Rare Disease Caucus
- United States–China Working Group

== See also ==
- Women in the United States House of Representatives

U.S. House of Representatives
Preceded by John Dingell	Member of the U.S. House of Representatives from Michigan's 12th congressional district 2015–2023	Succeeded by Rashida Tlaib
Preceded by Fred Upton	Member of the U.S. House of Representatives from Michigan's 6th congressional district 2023–present	Incumbent
U.S. order of precedence (ceremonial)
Preceded by Mark DeSaulnier	United States representatives by seniority 133rd	Succeeded by Tom Emmer
