= Recovering America's Wildlife Act =

Proposed American conservation law of 2022

Recovering America's Wildlife Act of 2021
- Long title: To amend the Pittman-Robertson Wildlife Restoration Act to make supplemental funds available for management of fish and wildlife species of greatest conservation need as determined by State fish and wildlife agencies, and for other purposes.

Legislative history
- Introduced in the House of Representatives by Debbie Dingell (D–MI) on April 22, 2021; Committee consideration by House Natural Resources; Passed the House of Representatives on June 14, 2022 (231–190)

The Recovering America's Wildlife Act (RAWA) is a bill in the United States Congress intended to provide funding for the conservation of wildlife in the United States.

In the 117th United States Congress, the House of Representatives passed it by 231–190, but although it passed the Senate Committee on Environment and Public Works on a bipartisan basis, it never passed the full Senate and therefore expired at the end of the Congressional term. However, its sponsors plan to reintroduce the legislation in the 118th Congress.

== Legislative history ==
=== 117th Congress ===
Versions of the legislation have been proposed since at least 2016. In the House of Representatives, the bill was first introduced in the 117th Congress on April 22, 2021, by lead sponsor Representative Debbie Dingell (D-MI). The lead Republican sponsor was Jeff Fortenberry, who resigned from the House on March 31, 2022. The House passed it by 231–190 on June 14, 2022.

The lead sponsors in the Senate are Martin Heinrich (D-NM) and Roy Blunt (R-MO). The act has 32 co-sponsors in the Senate, including 16 Republicans. In late 2021, it was successfully voted out of the Senate Environment and Public Works Committee with bipartisan support. In October 2022, Senator Amy Klobuchar, a supporter of the proposal, expressed optimism that it would pass before the end of the year, and noted that it was a top priority for Blunt, who was retiring at the end of the legislative session.

As of April 19, 2024:

Congress	Short title	Bill number(s)	Date introduced	Sponsor(s)	# of cosponsors	Latest status
117th Congress	Recovering America's Wildlife Act of 2022	H.R. 2773	April 22, 2021	Debbie Dingell (D-MI)	194	Passed the House (231 - 190).
117th Congress	Recovering America's Wildlife Act of 2022	S.2372	June 15, 2021	Martin Heinrich (D-NM)	47	Referred to committees of jurisdiction.
118th Congress	Recovering America’s Wildlife Act of 2023	S.1149	March 30, 2023	Martin Heinrich (D-NM)	19	Referred to committees of jurisdiction.

The RAWA never passed the full Senate in the 117th Congress and therefore expired at the end of the Congressional term on January 3, 2023.

=== 118th Congress ===
Senator Brian Schatz, a lead sponsor of the bill, plans to reintroduce the legislation in the 118th Congress. Schatz told Vox that he is optimistic that the bill can pass on a bipartisan basis. The bill was re-introduced by Sens. Thom Tillis and Martin Heinrich.

=== Status as of 2026 ===
As of mid-2026, the RAWA had still not been signed into law; lawmakers had yet to agree on a funding mechanism for the bill. Under the version passed by the House in 2022, Alabama—which has more federally listed threatened and endangered animal species than any U.S. state besides California—would have received an estimated $25 million annually, though the state's Republican congressional delegation voted against the bill.

== Provisions ==
The bill would provide $1.3 billion in annual funding for conservation efforts aimed at supporting at-risk, endangered, and other species. It would amend the 1937 Pittman-Robertson Act, which supported species targeted by game hunters and sportsmen. The modern act would allocate 15% of that spending towards endangered species. It would also direct nearly $100 million annually to tribal nations to support conservation work on about 140 million acres of land. The bill is intended to help direct funding to less charismatic animals and more obscure issues than previous conservation legislation. The Texas heelsplitter mussel, the regal fritillary butterfly, and the red knot seabird were cited by the Washington Post as among the targeted species.

The bill would be funded primarily through fees and penalties authorized by environmental regulations, which has raised concerns that the required funds may not always be reliably available. The House-approved version of the bill was anticipated to raise the deficit by $14.1 billion by 2032, ten years after passage. As the bill was considered in the Senate, conservation organizations urged its combination with the Charitable Conservation Easement Program Integrity Act, designed to eliminate tax breaks for fraudulent conservation easements, which would likely cover the costs of the RAWA.

== Support ==
RAWA is supported by the Biden White House, which released a statement on June 13, 2022, urging adoption of the bill. It is also supported by major environmental organizations such as Audubon, the WWF, and The Nature Conservancy. More than 1,000 advocacy groups have backed the legislation. Public polling conducted in September by Data for Progress reported strong bipartisan public support for the bill. The National Wildlife Federation has also expressed strong support for the bill.
