= Clyde Haberman =

American journalist

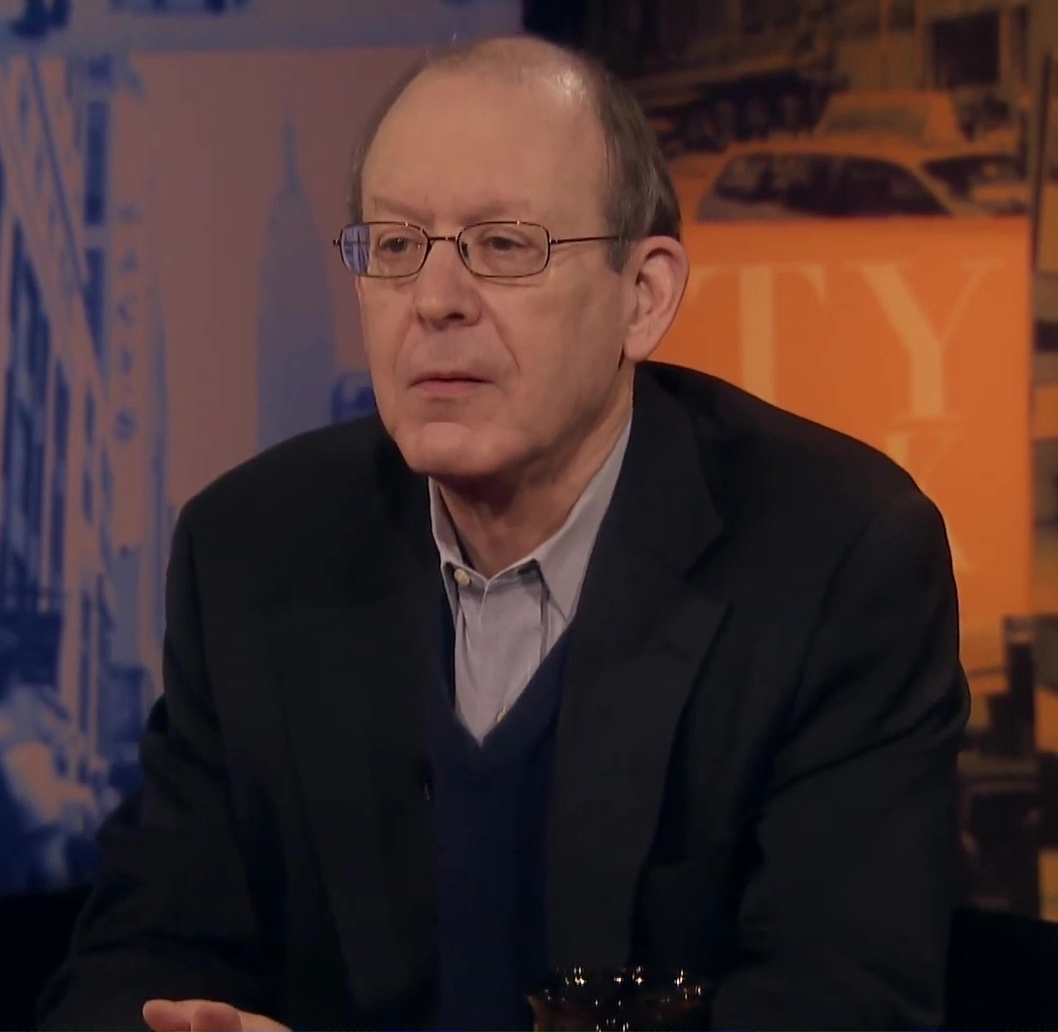
- Haberman on CUNY TV's City Talk
- Born: New York City, U.S.
- Education: City College of New York
- Occupation: Journalist
- Notable credit(s): The New York Times, New York Post, Retro Report
- Spouse(s): Nancy Spies Haberman; Kathleen Jones
- Children: Maggie, Zach, and Emma Haberman

Clyde Haberman is an American journalist who has contributed to The New York Times in various capacities since 1977.

== Early life and education ==
Haberman was born in the Bronx and raised in an Orthodox Jewish family and attended yeshiva through 8th grade. He is a graduate of The Bronx High School of Science (1962) and City College of New York (1966). He was drafted by the U.S. Army in 1968, serving two years, first in Georgia, then in Germany.

== Career ==
Haberman began his association with The New York Times as a copy boy in 1964 and then as City College of New York correspondent. He was fired by Abe Rosenthal in 1966 after sneaking a fictional college award and awardee into the Times. Details have been scrubbed from this article by previous editing. Haberman then worked at the New York Post, returning to the Times in 1977. His assignments included staff editor of The Week in Review; Metro reporter; City Hall bureau chief; and, from 1982 to 1995, foreign correspondent in Tokyo and Rome. He became the Times bureau chief in Tokyo from 1983 succeeding Henry Scott-Stokes, to 1988 during the height of Japan's economic bubble, and bureau chief in Jerusalem from 1991 to 1995. Over the years, he covered such major events as the Attica prison rebellion in 1971, the fall of Ferdinand Marcos in the Philippines in 1986, South Korea's pro-democracy uprising in 1987, the fall of Communism in Eastern Europe in 1989, the 1990 Iraqi invasion of Kuwait, the 1991 Persian Gulf War, the 1993 Oslo accords between Israel and the Palestine, the rise of Islamic terrorism in the Middle East, and the aftermath of the September 11 attacks in 2001.

He wrote "NYC", a twice-a-week column on New York City, from 1995 to 2011. In 2009, he was part of a Times team that won the Pulitzer Prize for Breaking News, awarded for coverage of the prostitution scandal that led to Eliot Spitzer's resignation as New York governor. In his April 8, 2011, column, entitled "One Last Attempt to Explain New York City", he announced that it would be his last "NYC" column. In May 2011, he began writing a column called "The Day" for The New York Times online "City Room" blog. That column ended in January 2013, and he began a new series of interviews for the Times. In 2014 he began writing an online series for the Times called Retro Report, linked with video documentaries exploring the long-term consequences of major news stories from the past. In 2017, he joined the Times editorial board.

He is the editor and writer of "The Times of the Seventies: The Culture, Politics, and Personalities that Shaped the Decade," published in 2013 by Black Dog & Leventhal. In 2015, he was inducted into the New York Press Club's Hall of Fame.

Haberman served as a professor at the Macaulay Honors College at Hunter College teaching an honors seminar course on New York City.

== Personal life ==
Clyde Haberman was first married to Nancy Spies Haberman, an executive with the public relations firm Rubenstein Associates. Their two children are Maggie Haberman, White House correspondent for The New York Times, and Zach Haberman, vice president at Hollis. Since 1984, Haberman has been married to Kathleen Jones, former director of special projects at Human Rights First and former associate publisher of The New York Review of Books. Their daughter is Emma Haberman, former special events manager at World Central Kitchen in Washington, D.C.

== See also ==
- New Yorkers in journalism
