= Regime Change: Inside the Imperial Presidency of Donald Trump =

2026 book by Maggie Haberman and Jonathan Swan

- First edition cover
- Author: Maggie Haberman; Jonathan Swan
- Audio read by: Robert Petkoff
- Language: English
- Subject: Second presidency of Donald Trump
- Publisher: Simon & Schuster
- Publication date: June 23, 2026
- Publication place: New York
- Media type: Print (hardcover), eBook, audio
- Pages: 496
- ISBN: 9781668067246 First edition hardcover
- Website: Official website

Regime Change: Inside the Imperial Presidency of Donald Trump is a non-fiction book of contemporary political journalism and real-time history by journalists Maggie Haberman and Jonathan Swan. It was published by Simon & Schuster in June 2026.

== Synopsis ==
In this book, Maggie Haberman and Jonathan Swan provide an account of the first year of Donald Trump's second term. A theme of the book is how Trump's prior legal challenges, convictions, and assassination attempts have informed his current presidency. This has resulted in more risk-taking and an expanded executive branch. The book shows a change in the White House's atmosphere, such as the departure of military officials and in house legal personnel that hardly advises against the president's directives.

The book covers Trump's expansion of presidential power, including bypassing congressional checks, ignoring court orders, and relying on personal instinct to make decisions that affect global markets and foreign leadership. Haberman and Swan describe several remarkable events from this term: Oval Office discussions that pertain to a new war in the Middle East, the closing of the U.S. border, the deployment of National Guard troops into cities, and violence between protestors and immigration agents.

The text also covers claims that the Justice Department has been directed to target political opponents, as well as criticisms that the presidency is being utilized as a profit-making enterprise. The book describes these internal operations and policy decisions as a transformation of the U.S. presidency and the global perception of American power. The book covers revelations about meetings that took place among senior staff in the White House Situation Room pertaining to the Epstein files.

The book also recounts how President Trump compared himself to other very powerful leaders of the past such as Mao, Stalin, and Attila the Hun.

=== Contrasts ===
The authors also contrast Trump's first and second terms, showing how he has learned from his first time in Washington. He now operates with an insulated, loyal inner circle and a personalized style of governance. This is unlike his first term, when he appointed traditional establishment figures like James Mattis and John Kelly. These establishment types often opposed his worldview. In contrast, Trump's second term relies on himself and a small number of trusted aides. Beyond this inner circle, he associates and connects with varieties of figures, such as corporate leaders, celebrities, and pardon-seekers. The authors say that a primary metric for inclusion in President Trump's orbit is a person's stance on the January 6 United States Capitol attack.

=== Other attributes ===
Trump is described as a "homebody" shuttling between the White House and his private clubs. Executive assistant Natalie Harp selects the president's daily information to focus almost on emphasizing positive news, while Chief of Staff Susie Wiles monitors and manages his moods. The administration's policy decisions are frequently characterized as interpersonal drama and factional disputes as officials compete for Trump's attention. The book says that disagreements about economic and trade policies involved figures like Treasury Secretary Scott Bessent, Elon Musk, Commerce Secretary Howard Lutnick, and Peter Navarro.

Friction between Trump's staff members influences areas pertaining to policy. For instance, there is Stephen Miller's dissatisfaction with former Homeland Security Secretary Kristi Noem over immigration. The authors describe the administration's foreign policy decisions as disorganized, pointing to envoys like Steve Witkoff who are reportedly given overwhelming and overlapping international assignments. The authors say that Trump's political comeback was unintentionally allowed by Democratic legal prosecutions. These allowed him to say his legal troubles were partisan attacks and pronounce his 2020 election loss as illegitimate. The book also says his victory was due to the Democratic Party's delay in moving away from Joe Biden as the 2024 presidential election nominee.

== Writing and publication ==
Haberman and Swan began working on Regime Change in 2024, conducting approximately one thousand interviews within two years.

== Reaction from Donald Trump ==
Referring to Haberman as "Magot [sic]", and criticizing her as "a third rate writer and intellect", Trump asserted in a social media post that it was "mostly made up, Fake News, largely fiction, as have been most of the things she has written about me for so many years".

== Reception ==
Paul Waldman of MS Now gathers this summary of the administration as shown by the book: "In short, everything about how the White House operates exacerbates Trump's most pernicious instincts and character flaws. His aides enable him to be the worst version of himself, and in turn he makes them the worst version of themselves."

According to The New York Times: "What the authors add is the vivid detail that makes these events feel actual. They wrest reality itself back from the distorted world of entertainment, illusion, fantasy and denial that Trump has generated around himself".

The review for The New Yorker said: "It transcends its genre. Although some of the material is familiar from the Times and other sources and from Trump's relentless self-exposure, the book is packed with news that will stay news".

A review carried by The Wall Street Journal said: "Regime Change is offered to us as definitive proof that the Trump presidency is a threat to the Republic. Their case is, of course, only as strong as their sources, most of whom speak from behind the arras to corroborate an alarmist story of the World Under Trump... The authors have captured Mr. Trump's world-class bluster. But they've also bought into it, and have thus failed to grasp that his whole is less—much less—than the sum of his parts".
