= Keswick Mountain Festival =

Annual festival in Keswick, Cumbria, England

The Keswick Mountain Festival is an annual festival held in May in Keswick, Cumbria, England. The festival was first held in 2007.

In 2012, the festival ran from 16 to 20 May and included guided walks, triathlons, kayaking, the "Keswick Sportive" (for cyclists), as well as the Borrowdale Trail Run and the Latrigg Fell Race. Speakers at Keswick's Rawnsley Centre included Helen Skelton, Sir Chris Bonington, Monty Halls and Cameron McNeish. In addition, there was as an evening with the Alpine Club and its president Mick Fowler. The temporary Keswick Mountain Festival Village is sited on the shores of Derwentwater.

According to The Observer, the festival is "one of the few places on the planet where Gore-Tex and gaiters might actually help you to pull".
