= Great Barrier Reef (2012 TV series) =

2012 television series

- Genre: Nature documentary
- Written by: James Brickell; Richard Fitzpatrick
- Directed by: James Brickell; Richard Fitzpatrick
- Presented by: Monty Halls
- Country of origin: United Kingdom
- No. of episodes: 3

Production
- Executive producer: Neil Nightingale
- Running time: 59 minutes
- Production companies: BBC Natural History Unit; Discovery Channel; Digital Dimensions; Nine Network

Original release
- Network: BBC Two; BBC HD
- Release: 1 January – 15 January 2012

Great Barrier Reef is a nature documentary series exploring the wildlife of the eponymous coral reef off Australia's coast. It was presented by Monty Halls and co-produced by the BBC Natural History Unit, Discovery Channel and Digital Dimensions. The series was broadcast in three parts in the United Kingdom, where it premiered in January 2012 on BBC Two and the BBC HD channel. In the US it aired as a two-hour special on Animal Planet on 9 September 2012.

Great Barrier Reef documents the ecosystem and marine life of the coral reef itself, along with the plants and animals on islands and the Australian mainland which owe their existence to the presence of the reef.

== Episodes ==
=== 1. "Nature's Miracle" ===
The first episode examines the structure of the coral reef and the wildlife which lives in it, as they compete and cooperate. The reef is also affected by numerous factors including the moon, sun, and weather.

=== 2. "Reef to Rainforest" ===
With a landmass larger than Great Britain, only 7% is coral reef. The rest is made of islands, mangrove swamps, and sand flats – all of which feature an array of animals. Even the 100 year old shipwreck of SS Yongala plays a part.

=== 3. "Reef and Beyond" ===
Alien creatures which are rarely seen rise out of the deep ocean waters to visit the warmer waters of the reef. Weather systems also play a part with cyclones posing a great danger to animals and the reef alike.
