= Congressional Caucus on Macedonia and Macedonian Americans =

The Congressional Caucus on North Macedonia and Macedonian Americans is a bi-cameral and bi-partisan group of members of Congress dedicated to maintaining and strengthening a positive and mutually beneficial relationship between the United States and North Macedonia. It was founded in 2011 by former congresswoman Candice Miller.

== Breakdown of current membership of the North Macedonia Caucus ==
=== House ===
- 8 Republicans
- 10 Democrats

=== Senate ===
- 1 Republican

== Members ==
=== Co-chairs ===
- Brendan Boyle (D-PA)
- Debbie Dingell (D-MI)
- Claudia Tenney (R-NY)

=== Representatives ===
Republican

- Robert Aderholt (R-AL)
- Troy Balderson (R-OH)
- Lisa McClain (R-MI)
- Chris Smith (R-NJ)
- Victoria Spartz (R-IN)
- Claudia Tenney (Co-chair)
- Mike Turner (R-OH)
- Mike Waltz (R-FL)

previously in office

- Curt Clawson (R-FL)
- Paul Cook (R-CA)
- Trent Franks (R-AZ)
- Adam Kinzinger (R-IL)
- Trey Radel (R-FL)
- Steve Stivers (Co-chair)
- Marlin Stutzman (R-IN)
- Pat Tiberi (R-OH)
- Dave Trott (R-MI)

Democrat

- Don Beyer (D-VA)
- Brendan Boyle (Co-chair)
- Gerry Connolly (D-VA)
- Debbie Dingell (Co-chair)
- John B. Larson (D-CT)
- Ted Lieu (D-CA)
- Joe Morelle (D-NY)
- Frank J. Mrvan (D-IN)
- Adam Smith (D-WA)

previously in office

- Madeleine Bordallo (Guam-at-Large)
- John Conyers (D-MI)
- Alcee Hastings (D-FL)
- Eddie Bernice Johnson (D-TX)
- Dan Maffei (D-NY)
- Jim Moran (D-VA)
- Bill Pascrell (D-NJ)
- Pete Visclosky (D-IN)

=== Senators ===
Republican

- Mike Braun (R-IN)
