= Retro Report =

Non-profit producer of short-form news documentaries

Retro Report Inc
- Formation: April 2013; 13 years ago
- Type: 501(c)(3)
- Headquarters: Mystic, Connecticut
- Revenue: $7.83 m USD (2024)
- Expenses: $8.25 m USD (2024)
- Website: retroreport.org

Retro Report is a US non-profit news organization that produces short-form documentaries for historical context of current news stories. The organization describes itself as a counterweight to the 24-hour news cycle. They have covered topics including the Population Bomb theory, the Tawana Brawley rape allegations, the 1993 Jack in the Box E. coli outbreak, the MMR vaccine-autism link allegations, the Ruby Ridge standoff, the Columbine High School massacre, the McDonald's hot coffee lawsuit, and the history of black activism in sports.

On October 7, 2019, Retro Report launched Retro Report on PBS, a one-hour news magazine series hosted by journalist Celeste Headlee and artist Masud Olufani, featuring humorist Andy Borowitz.

Retro Report's stories are published on their own website and also by distribution partners such as The New Yorker, Politico, PBS's American Experience, STAT News, Quartz and The New York Times, where they are featured alongside an article by longtime journalist Clyde Haberman. In a Poynter Institute for Media Studies article, Executive Producer Kyra Darnton describes Retro Report's mission as providing, "context and perspective by going back and re-reporting and reanalyzing older stories, or stories that we think of as not relevant anymore." In a 2014 Nieman Foundation for Journalism article, Ann Derry, The New York Times’ editorial director for video and television partnerships, said Retro Report's stories are "consistently among the most-watched pieces of video content at the Times." Since the series premiered on May 6, 2013, Retro Report has produced more than 175 short form documentaries.

== History ==
External videos
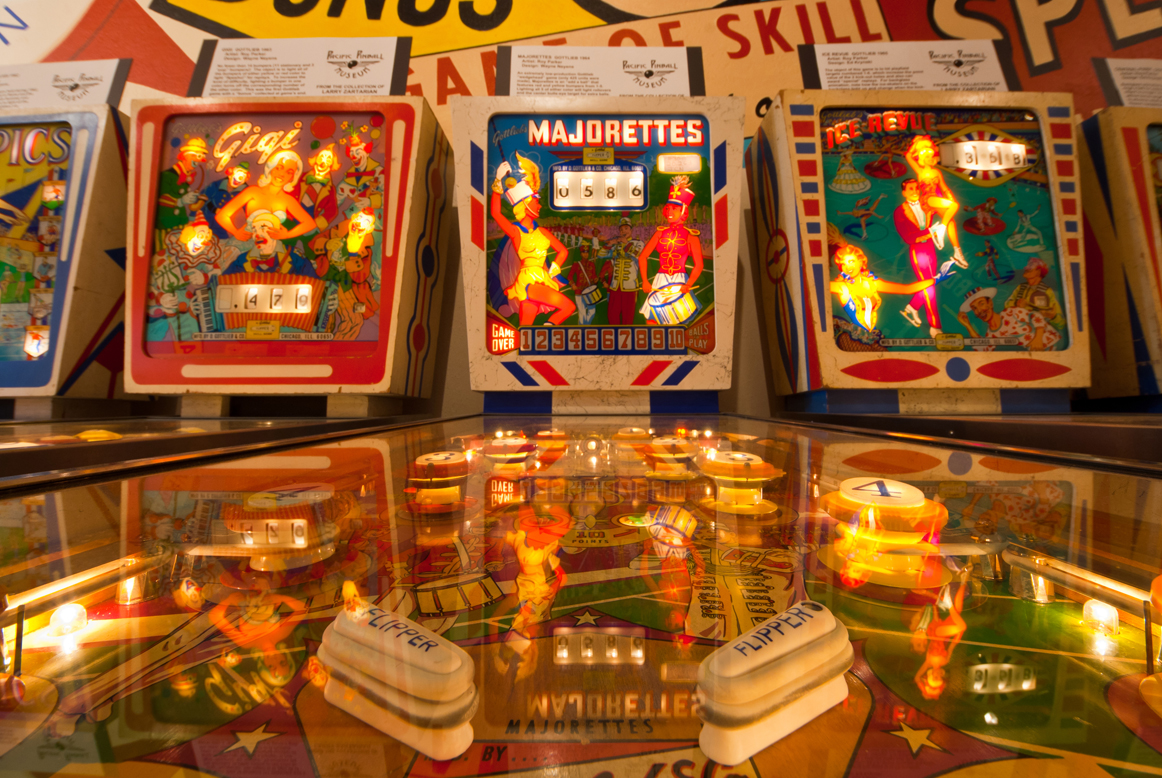
- Example videos
- When Pinball was Illegal, Retro Report Voices, 2:12, Retro Report
- Stealing J. Edgar Hoover's Secrets, Retro Report, 13:36, December 15, 2016

Retro Report was created as a non-profit organisation by entrepreneur and philanthropist Christopher Buck (son of Subway founder Peter Buck) and is run by Executive Producer Kyra Darnton and a team of producers, reporters, and editors, who come mostly from news organizations 60 Minutes and Frontline.

== Awards ==
- News & Documentary Emmy Awards

Nominated -- Outstanding Business, Consumer or Economic Report for "Future of Aging" (2019)
Nominated -- Outstanding Editing: News for "Operation Ceasefire" (2019)
Nominated – Outstanding Arts, Culture and Entertainment Report for "All in the Game: The Black Athlete in America" (2018)
Nominated – Outstanding Promotional Announcement for "What Happens Next" trailer (2018)
Nominated – Outstanding Coverage of a Breaking News Story for "Vaccines: An Unhealthy Skepticism" (2016)
Winner – Outstanding Editing for News for "Go or No Go: The Challenger Legacy" (2015)
Nominated – Outstanding Continuing Coverage of a News Story in a News Magazine for "The Shadow of Thalidomide" (2014)

- Gerald Loeb Award

Winner – Best Video for the "Future of Money" (2018)

- Edward R. Murrow Award:

Winner - Feature Reporting for "Future of Gaming" in collaboration with Quartz (2019)
Winner – Best in Sports for "The Black Athlete in America" (2018)
Winner – Regional Overall Excellence (2017)
Winner – Regional Continuing Coverage for "Unraveling Zero Tolerance" (2017)
Winner – Regional Hard News for "After Bush v. Gore" (2017)
Winner – Regional Breaking News for "Nuclear Winter" (2017)
Winner – Best Regional Continuing and Investigative Coverage for "Atomic Vets" (produced with Center for Investigative Reporting) (2017)
Winner – Best Regional Documentary for "On Account of Sex" (produced with Fork Films) (2017)
Winner – Regional Overall Excellence (2016)
Winner – Best Regional Video News Documentary for "Transforming History" (2016)
Winner – Best Regional Continuing Coverage for "The Population Bomb?" (2016)
Winner – Best National Continuing Coverage for "A Search for Justice" (2015)
Winner – Overall Excellence (2014)
Winner – Best Regional Video News Documentary for "The Sleeper Cell That Wasn't" (2014)

- Webby Awards:

Nominated -- News & Politics for Best Overall Series (2019)
Winner -- Sports for "All in the Game: Black Athlete in America" (2019)
Nominated -- News & Politics for "Why We Can't Have a Civil Conversation About Guns" (2019)
Nominated -- Technology for "Future of Gaming" in collaboration with Quartz (2019)
Winner – Film & Video - News & Politics: Best Overall Series (2018)
Nominated – Film & Video: News & Politics for 'Why Hasn't Sexual Harassment Disappeared?' (2018)
Nominated – Film & Video: Technology for "The Future of Money" (2018)News & Politics
Nominated – Film & Video: Trailer for "What Happens Next" (2018)News & Politics
Honoree – Film & Video: News & Politics for Best Overall Series (2017)
Nominated – Film & Video: Technology for "The Terminator and the Washing Machine" (2017)
Nominated – News & Politics: Individual Episode for "Where Does the American Dream Live?" (2017)
Honoree – Best Online Video, News & Politics for "Anatomy of an Interrogation" (2016)
Honoree – Best Editing for "Go or No Go: the Challenger Legacy" (2015)

- Mirror Awards:

Nominated - Best Single Article/Story for "The Outrage Machine" (2017)
Nominated – Best Single Story for "Haunted by Columbine" (2016)
Nominated – Best Single Story for "Taking the Lid Off the McDonald’s Coffee Case" (2014)

- Gracie Awards:

Winner – Outstanding Original Online Programming for "The Shadow of Thalidomide" (2014)

- The Jackson Hole Science Media Awards:
- Nominated – Best short form series for "The Code" (2018)
- Society of Business Editors and Writers: Winner – Best Video for "What Happens Next" (2018)
- National Press Photographers Association

Recognized in the Best Photojournalism Competition for photos take in India (2016)

- FOCAL International Awards

Winner – FOCAL International Award for use of innovative archival footage for "Go or No Go: The Challenger Legacy" (2015)
