= Kristen Holmes =

American broadcast journalist

Kristen Holmes (born 1986 or 1987) is an American journalist and the Senior White House Correspondent for CNN.

== Education ==
Holmes received a Bachelor of Science degree from the Medill School at Northwestern University, and her Masters from Columbia University's Graduate School of Journalism.

== Career ==
=== White House ===
During the second administration of Donald Trump, Holmes was listed as a "media offender" on the official White House website.

On August 17, 2026, Holmes asked President Donald Trump a question during a press gaggle in the Oval Office about comments made by Senator Jon Ossoff, who during a weekend campaign event has stated Trump would rather travel with his aide, Natalie Harp, and build the White House Ballroom, than do his job as president.

Trump responded to Holmes' question by telling her, "Quiet, quiet, quiet. You’re very disrespectful." The White House rapid response X account later criticized Holmes in a post invoking her children, writing, "Someday, your children will come across your disgusting and inhumane question. They will be sickened and embarrassed to have a parent be so callous and vindictive. It’s quite troubling."

The Washington Post described the White House as crossing a line "rarely breached by politicians to invoke her children."

== Personal life ==
Holmes is married to Noah Gray, chief of communications for the District of Columbia Fire and Emergency Medical Services Department. They have two children.
