= Armand Cucciniello =

American diplomat (born 1979)

- Born: December 7, 1979 (age 46)
- Education: Boston University (BA); Syracuse University (MA)
- Occupations: Writer, former diplomat

Armand V. Cucciniello III (born December 7, 1979) is a former American diplomat, news reporter, military advisor, political commentator, and public relations executive. Cucciniello was formerly spokesman for the U.S. Embassy in Iraq.

== Education ==
Cucciniello is a graduate of Boston University, where he earned a Bachelor of Arts degree in 2002. He later earned an M.A. from Syracuse University's Maxwell School of Citizenship and Public Affairs.

Cucciniello is also a graduate of the National War College at National Defense University, where he concentrated in cyber studies and digital influence. While a student there, Cucciniello wrote about and published essays on state-sponsored Chinese digital influence and Russian online propaganda.

== Early career ==
In 2006, Cucciniello moved to Baghdad, Iraq to work for Multi-National Force – Iraq (MNF-I). Shortly after, he was hired by the U.S. Department of State to work in the Public Affairs Section at the U.S. embassy, located in the former Republican Palace (Arabic: القصر الجمهوري al-Qaṣr al-Ǧumhūriy) of Saddam Hussein. As such, Cucciniello was made a non-career U.S. diplomat and became a spokesperson for the U.S. embassy until 2010.

He was vice president of Blue Force Communications, a public relations agency with offices in New York City and Washington, D.C.

Cucciniello's writing and commentary spans technology, global affairs, foreign policy, and cybersecurity. Some of his earliest known writing is from 2001 and 2003 on information technology and India, which was, at the time, a little-known but rapidly growing hub for business processes outsourcing.

In a 2016 article for USA Today, Cucciniello was the first person to describe then-U.S. presidential candidate Donald Trump's foreign policy as "America First," a moniker subsequently used by New York Times reporters David E. Sanger and Maggie Haberman in their interview with Trump, who "agreed with a suggestion that his ideas might be summed up as 'America First'." The phrase became a cornerstone of Trump's campaign platform, and later of both Trump administrations.
