= Confront and Conceal =

English nonfiction book

Confront and Conceal: Obama's Secret Wars and Surprising Use of American Power
- Author: David E. Sanger
- Language: English
- Genre: Non-fiction
- Publisher: Random House
- Publication date: 2012
- Publication place: United States
- Pages: 448
- ISBN: 978-0307718020

Confront and Conceal: Obama's Secret Wars and Surprising Use of American Power is a 2012 book by David E. Sanger. It discusses the foreign policy of the Obama administration, with an emphasis on the president's use of covert operations, drone strikes, and cyberwarfare. In 2016, the former Vice Chairman of the Joint Chiefs of Staff General James Cartwright pleaded guilty to making false statements to federal investigators regarding his alleged disclosure of classified information to Sanger about the military use of the Stuxnet computer worm on the Natanz nuclear enrichment facility, an operation detailed in the book.
