= Monty Halls =

British TV broadcaster, diver and naturalist

- Born: 5 November 1966 (age 60); Exeter, England
- Education: Bedstone College; University of Plymouth
- Occupations: TV presenter, underwater diver
- Television: Monty Halls' Great Escape, Animal Planet, Perfect Weapon
- Spouse: Tamsyn Smith
- Children: 2
- Website: montyhalls.co.uk

Monty Halls (born 5 November 1966) is a British TV broadcaster and marine biologist best known for his BBC Great Escape series Monty Halls' Great Escape, Monty Halls' Great Hebridean Escape and Monty Halls' Great Irish Escape, during which he lived and worked in remote parts of the UK and Ireland with his dog Reuben. Halls' other TV programmes include WWII's Great Escapes, Great Barrier Reef and Lost Worlds with Leo Houlding for Discovery Channel.

Halls is the founder and managing director of Seadog TV and Film Productions Ltd and Leaderbox.

== Background and career ==
Born in Wakefield, Halls attended Bedstone College, where he was head boy, after which he was commissioned as a Royal Marines officer. His time in the Marines included a period in the British Military Assistance and Training Team in South Africa, where he assisted with the integration of former ANC guerrillas into the South African Army.

At 29, having left the Royal Marines, Halls studied Marine Biology at the University of Plymouth where he became involved with projects including the underwater filming of a rare species of crocodile in Belize in partnership with the Natural History Museum of London. He graduated with a First Class Honours Bachelor's degree in 1999.

=== Exploration ===
Halls has led a number of scuba diving expeditions and was an expedition leader for the marine conservation charity Coral Cay Conservation. In 2002, Halls led a group of adventurers and scientists (from the Scientific Exploration Society) to the sunken city of Mahabalipuram off Tamil Nadu (India), and discovered six temples, which are still being explored. In 2015 he led the 'Shoals of Agulhas' expedition on behalf of Land Rover, following the route of the annual Sardine Run from Port Elizabeth to Durban. Halls is also a Steppes Travel tour leader.

=== Television work ===
In 2005, he presented a nine-part TV series called Great Ocean Adventures (co-produced by RDF Television and Channel Five). A second series was broadcast in 2007. Memorable moments include Halls diving among a large number of Giant Humboldt Squid. In 2008 he co-hosted a National Geographic series, Perfect Weapon, looking at aspects of medieval weaponry. In 2008, Halls left his home in Bristol for Applecross on the west coast of Scotland for the first of the three BBC Great Escape series, Monty Halls' Great Escape, where he tried to recreate the life of crofters for six months. In 2009 Halls then left for the Outer Hebrides to live and work as a nature warden on North Uist for six months. 2010 saw Monty live for six months in Connemara working with Irish Whale & Dolphin Conservation Group (IWDG). All of these series featured his dog, Reuben.

In 2016 Halls formed Seadog TV and Film Productions and in 2017 produced and presented WWII's Great Escapes: The Freedom Trails, a four-part series in which Halls re-traced the journeys made by escaped prisoners of war out of Nazi occupied Europe. The series first broadcast on Channel 4 in September 2017.

In February 2018 Channel 4 announced a second series from Halls and Seadog TV and Film Productions, My Family and the Galapagos.

=== Speaking ===
Halls is a public and motivational speaker and has spoken at events such as The Adventure Travel Show, the Keswick Mountain Festival and the London 'Night of Adventure' event, hosted by fellow explorer and speaker Alastair Humphreys.

=== Leaderbox ===
In 2016 Halls founded Leaderbox, a universal leadership and team building tool designed to develop confidence, fosters teamwork, and generate key leadership skills in young people and professionals.

=== Charity work ===
With his background as a Royal Marine, Halls was deeply moved when his close friend and best man, Major Jason Ward RM was killed in a helicopter crash on 21 March 2003, the second day of the Iraq War (Operation Telic). Halls supports military charities, in particular he is a patron of Help for Heroes, a charity committed to improving the facilities for injured servicemen and women. As a marine biologist he supports charities associated with the marine environment, and is also a patron of Shark Trust. In 2015 Halls became president of the Galapagos Conservation Trust after serving as Ambassador for many years.

== Awards ==
In 2003, Halls was awarded the Bish Medal by the "Scientific Exploration Society" for his services to exploration. In December 2010, he was awarded an Honorary Doctor of Science Degree by Plymouth University., and in 2016 an 'Outstanding Contribution to Diving' award by Sport Diver magazine.

== Personal life ==
Halls lives in Devon, England with his wife Tamsyn Smith and their daughters Isla and Molly.

== Filmography ==
Television

- Contestant and winner of Superhuman (2004) on Channel 4
- Great Ocean Adventures (Season 1, nine episodes in 2005)
- Great Ocean Adventures (Season 2, eight episodes 2007)
- Perfect Weapon (Six episodes in 2008)
- Monty Halls' Great Escape (BBC Two, from 1 March 2009; broadcast as Beachcomber Cottage in Australia and New Zealand)
- Monty Halls' Great Hebridean Escape (BBC Two, from 21 April 2010; broadcast as Monty Halls' Island Escape in Australia from 28 December 2012)
- Monty Halls' Great Irish Escape (BBC Two, from 11 August 2011)
- Great Barrier Reef (BBC Two, 1–22 January 2012, 3 episodes)
- The Fisherman's Apprentice (BBC Two, from 29 February 2012, 6 episodes)
- Monty Halls' Dive Mysteries (Channel 5, from 30 November 2013, 4 episodes)
- Lost Worlds (Discovery, from 2014, 4 episodes)
- The Great Shark Chase (Discovery, June 2016)
- WWII's Great Escapes: The Freedom Trails (Channel 4, September 2017, 4 episodes)
- My Family and the Galapagos (Channel 4, July 2018, series 1, 3 episodes)
- My Family and the Galapagos (Channel 4, Feb 2020, series 2, 3 episodes)

== Bibliography ==
- Dive: The Ultimate Guide – 60 of the World's Top Dive Locations (September 2004, Ultimate Sports Publications Ltd)
- Scuba Diving (Eyewitness Companions) (August 2004, Dorling Kindersley)
- Great Ocean Adventures (February 2007, Broadcast Books)
- Go Scuba Dive (April 2007, Dorling Kindersley)
- Dive: The Ultimate Guide – 70 of the World's Top Dive Locations (September 2008, Ultimate Sports Publications Ltd)
- Monty Halls' Great Escape: Beachcomber Cottage (March 2009, BBC Books)
- The Great Escape: Adventures on the Wild West Coast (February 2010, BBC Books)
- Monty Halls' Great Irish Escape (April 2011, BBC Books)
- The Fisherman's Apprentice (April 2012, BBC Books)
- Escaping Hitler: Stories of Courage and Endurance on the Freedom Trails (September 2017, Pan Macmillan)
- My Family and the Galapagos (accompanying book to the Channel 4 series) (13th Feb 2020, Headline Publishing Group)
