= James Cartwright =

8th Vice Chairman of the Joint Chiefs of Staff

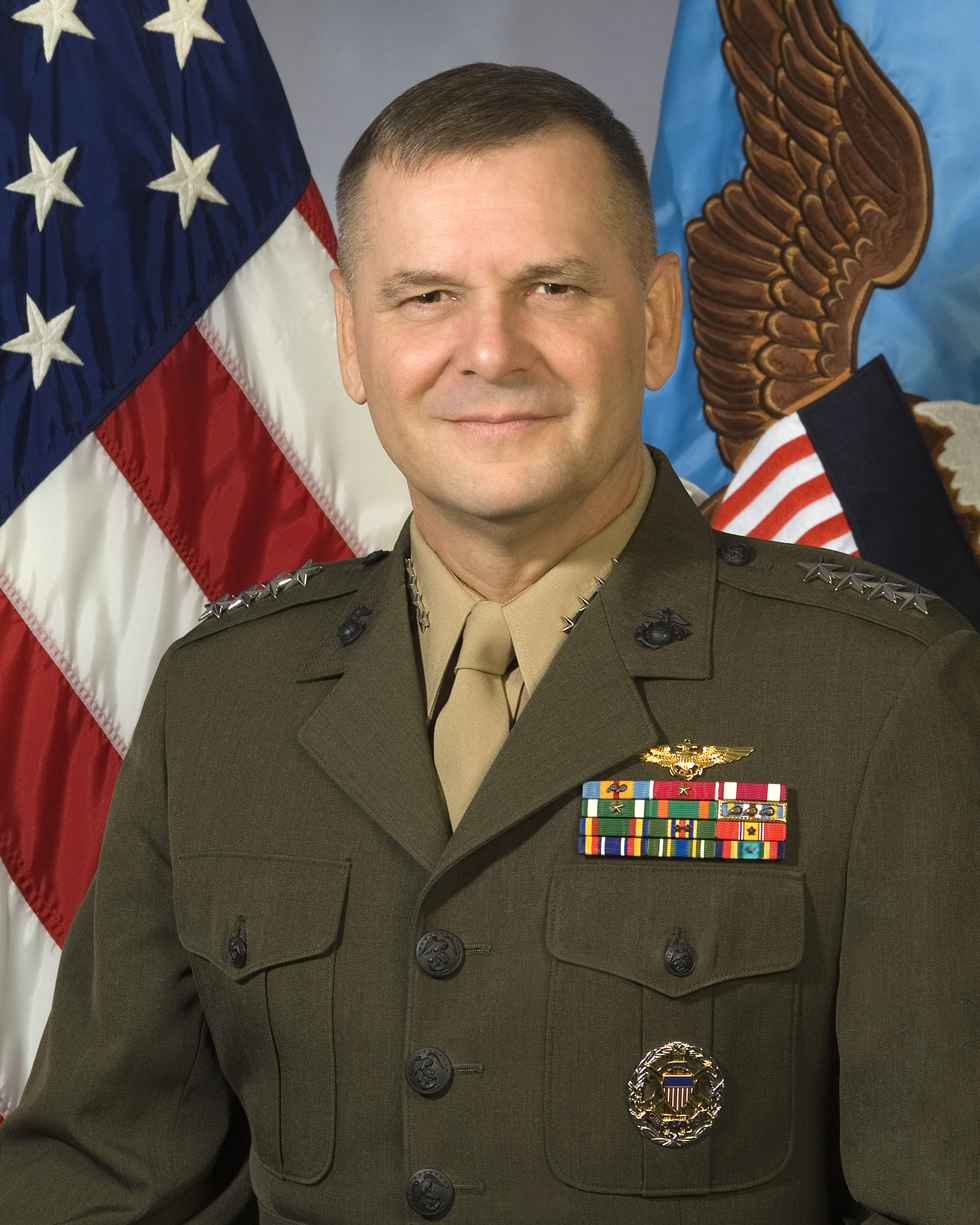
- Official portrait, 2007
- Born: September 22, 1949 (age 77); Rockford, Illinois, United States
- Military career
- Allegiance: United States
- Branch: United States Marine Corps
- Service years: 1971–2011
- Rank: General
- Nickname: "Hoss"
- Commands: Vice Chairman of the Joint Chiefs of Staff; United States Strategic Command; 1st Marine Aircraft Wing; Marine Aircraft Group 31; Marine Fighter Attack Squadron 232
- Conflicts: War on terror
- Awards: Defense Distinguished Service Medal (4); Navy Distinguished Service Medal; Army Distinguished Service Medal; Air Force Distinguished Service Medal; Coast Guard Distinguished Service Medal; Legion of Merit (2)

James Edward "Hoss" Cartwright (born September 22, 1949) is a retired United States Marine Corps general who last served as the eighth vice chairman of the Joint Chiefs of Staff from August 31, 2007, to August 3, 2011. He previously served as the Commander, U.S. Strategic Command, from September 1, 2004, to August 10, 2007, and as Acting Commander, U.S. Strategic Command from July 9, 2004, to September 1, 2004. He retired from the Marine Corps on August 3, 2011, after nearly 40 years of service.

Cartwright was accused of providing classified information that was published in the book Confront and Conceal by David Sanger. During the course of the investigation, Cartwright agreed to be interviewed by the FBI without a lawyer present. He was indicted for lying to the FBI regarding the time and locations of meetings with Sanger. Cartwright was never charged with leaking any classified information; Sanger maintains that Cartwright did not provide him with any classified material. On October 17, 2016, he pleaded guilty to lying to the FBI regarding an investigation into the source of leaked classified information. He had been scheduled to be sentenced on January 31, 2017, but was pardoned and had his security clearance restored by President Barack Obama on January 17, 2017.

== Early life and education ==
Cartwright was born on September 22, 1949, in Rockford, Illinois, and attended West High School before going on to the University of Iowa. While there he was a scholarship swimmer for the Iowa Hawkeyes.

== Career ==
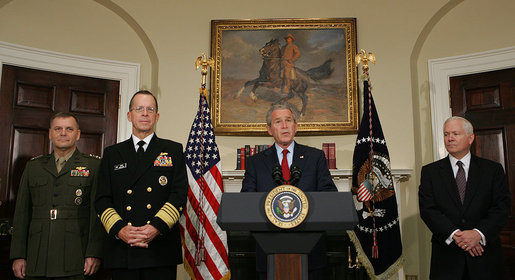
President George W. Bush (at lectern) announces the nominations of Cartwright (far left) and Michael Mullen (second from left) to be Vice Chairman and Chairman of the Joint Chiefs of Staff, respectively, on June 28, 2007

Cartwright was commissioned a second lieutenant in the U.S. Marine Corps in November 1971. He attended Naval Flight Officer training and graduated in April 1973. He attended Naval Aviator training and graduated in January 1977. He has operational assignments as a naval flight officer in the F-4, and as a pilot in the F-4, OA-4, and F/A-18. His callsign comes from the fictional character Eric "Hoss" Cartwright, the middle brother on the classic 1960s TV show Bonanza, who was played by actor Dan Blocker.

Cartwright's operational assignments include: Commanding General, 1st Marine Aircraft Wing (2000–2002); Deputy Commanding General Marine Forces Atlantic (1999–2000); Commander Marine Aircraft Group 31 (1994–1996); Commander Marine Fighter Attack Squadron 232 (1992); Fixed Wing Operations Marine Aircraft Group 24 (1991); Commander Marine Aviation Logistics Squadron 12 (1989–1990); Administration Officer and Officer-In-Charge Deployed Carrier Operations VMFAT-101 (1983–1985); Aircraft Maintenance Officer VMFA-235 (1979–1982); Line Division Officer VMFA-333 USS Nimitz (1975–1977); Embarkation OIC VMFA-251 & 232 (1973–1975).

Cartwright's staff assignments include: Director for Force Structure, Resources and Assessment, J-8 the Joint Staff (2002–2004); Directorate for Force Structure, Resources and Assessment, J-8 the Joint Staff (1996–1999); Deputy Aviation Plans, Policy, and Budgets Headquarters, U.S. Marine Corps (1993–1994); Assistant Program Manager for Engineering, F/A-18 Naval Air Systems Command (1986–1989).

Cartwright was named the Outstanding Carrier Aviator by the Association of Naval Aviation in 1983. He graduated with distinction from the Air Command and Staff College, Maxwell AFB 1986, and received his Master of Arts in National Security and Strategic Studies from the Naval War College, Newport, Rhode Island, 1991. In 2008, he was honored with the Naval War College Distinguished Graduate Leadership Award. He was selected for and completed a fellowship with MIT Seminar XXI in 1994.

From July 9, 2004, to September 1, 2004, Lieutenant General Cartwight served as Acting Commander, United States Strategic Command while awaiting official assumption of office and promotion as Strategic Command's new commander. On September 1, 2004, Cartwright was sworn in as Commander, United States Strategic Command. He was promoted to full general on the same day.

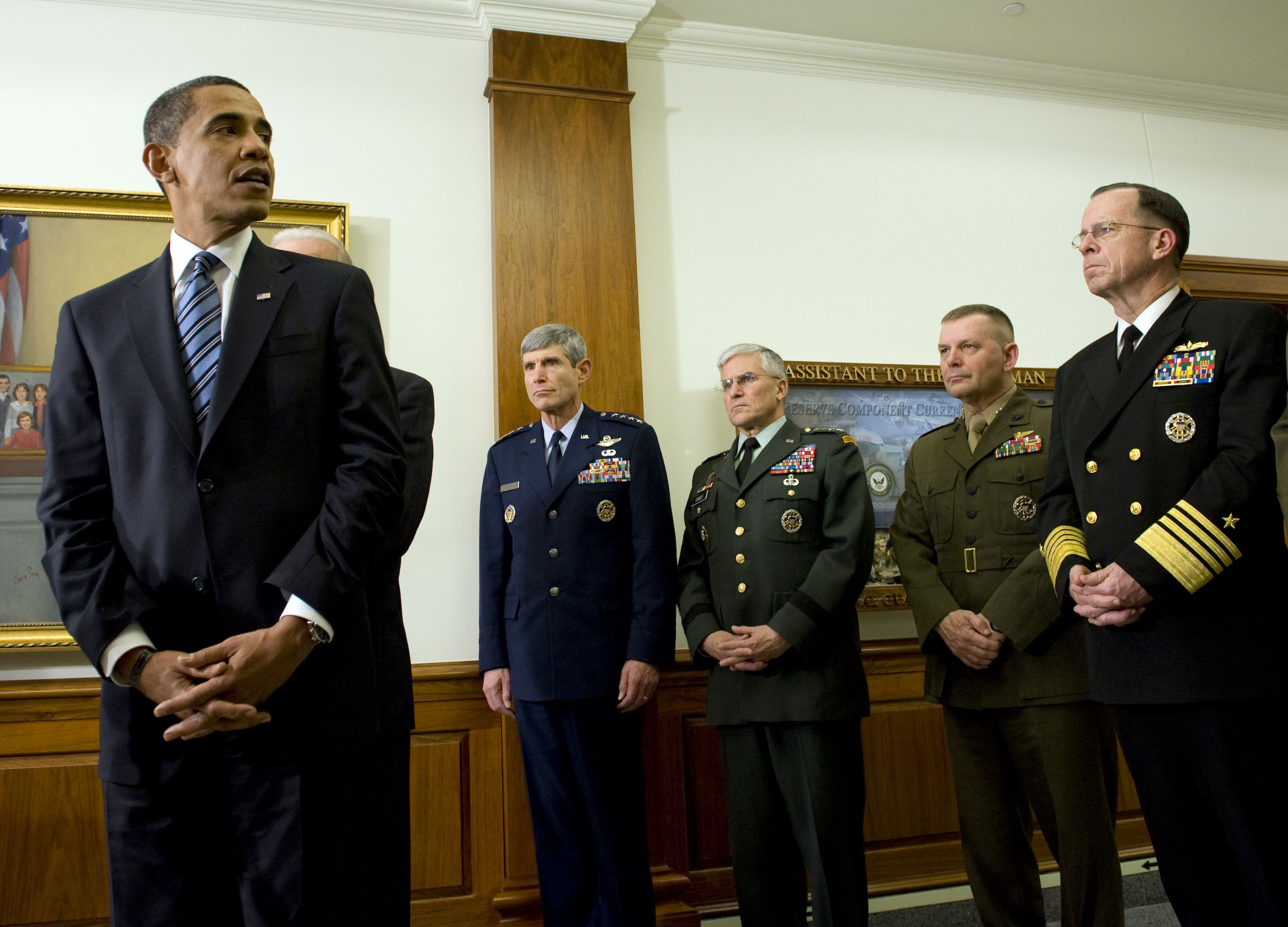
(Jan. 28, 2009) President Barack Obama, with Gen. Norton Schwartz, Air Force chief of staff; Gen. George W. Casey, U.S. Army chief of staff; Gen. James E. Cartwright, Vice Chairman of the Joint Chiefs of Staff and Adm. Mike Mullen, Chairman of the Joint Chiefs of Staff, during the President's first visit to the Pentagon as the Commander-in-Chief.

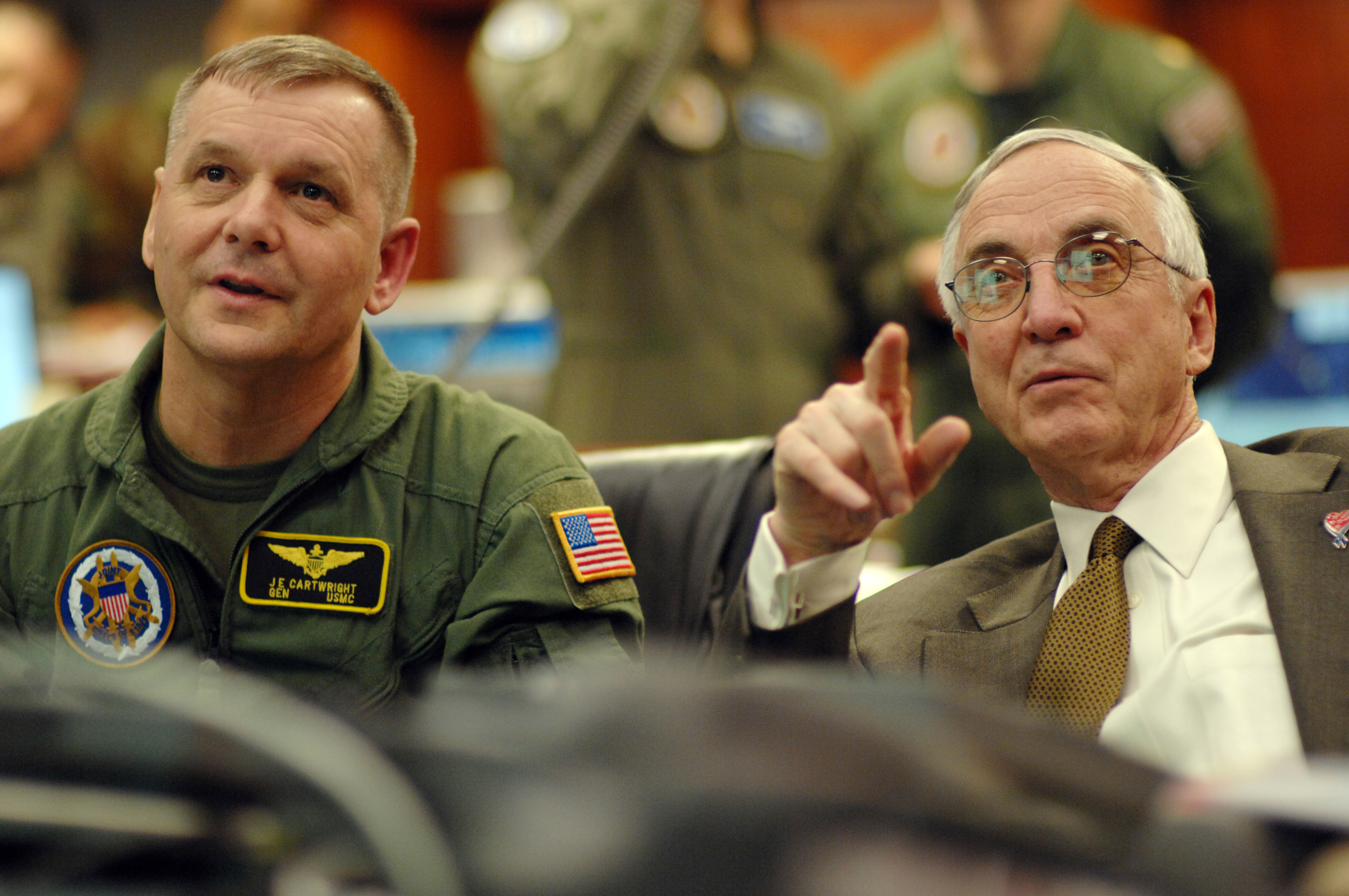
Cartwright (left) and Deputy Defense Secretary Gordon R. England watching the progress of an SM-3 anti-ballistic missile in 2008

On June 8, 2007, Defense Secretary Robert Gates recommended Cartwright to be the next Vice Chairman of the Joint Chiefs of Staff, to replace retiring Admiral Edmund Giambastiani. President George W. Bush formally announced the nomination, with that of Admiral Michael Mullen to be Chairman of the Joint Chiefs of Staff, on June 28, 2007.

Senator John Warner of Virginia, the senior Republican on the Senate Armed Services Committee, stated, "General Cartwright has an extraordinary grasp and understanding of the global posture that America must maintain in this era of new and ever-changing threats".

Cartwright's nomination was confirmed by the full Senate on August 3, 2007. Due to the retirement of Admiral Giambastiani on July 27, 2007, Cartwright assumed the position immediately upon confirmation. He was sworn in on August 31, 2007, as the 8th Vice Chairman. On March 18, 2009, Secretary of Defense Gates announced that Cartwright had been nominated for a second term as Vice Chairman of the Joint Chiefs. He was confirmed by the Senate on July 31, 2009.

The military investigated Cartwright in 2009 and 2010 for possible misconduct involving a female Marine captain, and investigators recommended administrative action for "failure to discipline a subordinate" and "fostering an unduly familiar relationship". Secretary of the Navy Ray Mabus, however, reviewed the evidence and found it insufficient to warrant corrective action for even the lesser offenses. He stated, "I do not agree with the conclusion that General Cartwright maintained an 'unduly familiar relationship' with his aide. Nor do I agree that General Cartwright's execution of his leadership responsibilities vis-à-vis his aide or any other member of his staff was inconsistent with the leadership requirements". Questions about how he oversaw his staff, however, were mentioned as a reason Cartwright had fallen out as the favored candidate of President Obama for Chairman of the Joint Chiefs of Staff in 2011. Army chief Gen. Martin Dempsey was named to the post. "Some Republicans [had] ... quietly criticized Gen. Cartwright, calling him 'Obama's general,'" one report at the time also said.

Cartwright held his retirement ceremony on August 3, 2011. During the ceremony, Deputy Secretary of Defense William J. Lynn III presented Cartwright his fourth Defense Distinguished Service Medal. He also received the Army, Navy, Air Force, and Coast Guard distinguished service medals.

== Dates of rank ==
Insignia	Rank	Date
	Second Lieutenant	November 12, 1971
	First Lieutenant	November 1, 1973
	Captain	November 7, 1976
	Major	August 1, 1977
	Lieutenant Colonel	November 1, 1981
	Colonel	March 9, 1993
	Brigadier General	October 1, 1997
	Major General	2001
	Lieutenant General	May 6, 2002
	General	July 21, 2004

== Military awards and badges ==
Cartwright received the following decorations, awards, and badges:

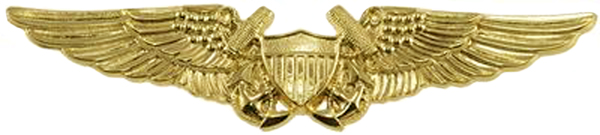

Naval Aviator insignia Naval Flight Officer insignia
Defense Distinguished Service Medal w/ three oak leaf clusters	Navy Distinguished Service Medal	Army Distinguished Service Medal	Air Force Distinguished Service Medal
Coast Guard Distinguished Service Medal	Meritorious Service Medal	Legion of Merit w/ one 5/16" Gold Star	Navy and Marine Corps Commendation Medal w/ one 5/16" Gold Star
Navy and Marine Corps Achievement Medal	Joint Meritorious Unit Award w/ four oak leaf clusters	Navy Unit Commendation	Navy Meritorious Unit Commendation w/ two 3/16" bronze stars
National Defense Service Medal w/ two 3/16" bronze stars	Global War on Terrorism Service Medal	Korea Defense Service Medal	Navy Sea Service Deployment Ribbon w/ one 3/16" silver star
Office of the Joint Chiefs of Staff Identification Badge

== Leak investigation, conviction, and pardon ==
In June 2013, it was reported that Cartwright had received a target letter from the U.S. Justice Department, informing him that he was under investigation for leaking classified information about Stuxnet, a computer virus used in a U.S.-Israel cyberattack against centrifuges in Iranian nuclear facilities (see Operation Olympic Games). Federal investigators reportedly suspected that Cartwright leaked details of the operation to a New York Times reporter.

In March 2015, the Washington Post reported that the sensitive leak investigation, led by Rod Rosenstein, had "stalled amid concerns that a prosecution in federal court could force the government to confirm" information about the highly classified program. U.S. officials feared that if classified information were revealed in any information, it would harm U.S.-Israeli relations and would also complicate the then-pending negotiations on an agreement with Iran over the nuclear program. It was reported that federal prosecutors had discussions with the Office of White House Counsel, then led by Kathryn Ruemmler, on whether certain material important to the case would be declassified, and Ruemmler conveyed that the government was unwilling to provide the documentation.

Cartwright denied any wrongdoing; his attorney, Gregory B. Craig, said in March 2015 that Cartwright had no contact with federal investigators for over a year. Craig stated: "General Cartwright has done nothing wrong. He has devoted his entire life to defending the United States. He would never do anything to weaken our national defense or undermine our national security. Hoss Cartwright is a national treasure, a genuine hero and a great patriot."

On November 2, 2012, in an interview with the FBI, Cartwright denied he was the source of the leaks. On October 17, 2016, Cartwright entered a guilty plea in the U.S. District Court for the District of Columbia on a charge of making false statements during the leak investigation, a felony.

Outgoing President Barack Obama pardoned Cartwright on January 17, 2017, two weeks prior to his scheduled sentencing hearing.

== Post-retirement work ==
Cartwright was the inaugural holder of the Harold Brown Chair in Defense Policy Studies at the Center for Strategic and International Studies, a post he held from 2011 until 2017. In addition, Cartwright serves as a member of the board of directors of The Raytheon Company, a senior fellow at the Belfer Center for Science and International Affairs at Harvard Kennedy School, and as a defense consultant for ABC News.

Cartwright is an advisor for several corporate entities involved in global management consulting, technology services and program solutions, predictive and big data analytics, and advanced systems engineering, integration, and decision-support services. He serves as an advisor to the board of directors for Accenture, Enlightenment Capital, IxReveal, Logos Technologies, Opera Solutions, and TASC Inc. He is also affiliated with a number of professional organizations, including the Aspen Strategy Group, The Atlantic Council, the Nuclear Threat Initiative, and the Sanya Initiative.

Cartwright is also a leading advocate for the phased and verified elimination of all nuclear weapons worldwide ("Global Zero (campaign)"). In October 2011, he spoke at the Global Zero Summit at the Ronald Reagan Presidential Library in Simi Valley, California, and currently serves as Chair of the Global Zero U.S. Nuclear Policy Commission, which in May 2012 released its report, "Modernizing U.S. Nuclear Force Structure and Policy," calling for the United States and Russia to reduce their nuclear arsenals 80% to 900 total weapons each, which would pave the way to bringing other nuclear weapons countries into the first-in-history multilateral nuclear arms negotiations.

In June 2015, Cartwright was a signatory to a public letter written by a bipartisan group of 19 U.S. diplomats, experts, and others, on the then-pending negotiations for an agreement between Iran and world powers over Iran's nuclear program. That letter outlined concerns about several provisions in the then-unfinished agreement and called for a number of improvements to strengthen the prospective agreement and win the letter-writers' support for it. The final agreement, concluded in July 2015, shows the influence of the letter. Cartwright endorsed the final agreement in August 2015, becoming one of 36 retired generals and admirals to sign an open letter in support of the agreement.

Government civilian positions

- 2011–2013: Defense Policy Board Advisory Committee Member
- 2014: National Defense Panel, United States Institute of Peace

== See also ==
- List of United States Marine Corps four-star generals
- List of people pardoned or granted clemency by the president of the United States

Military offices
Preceded by Edmund P. Giambastiani	Vice Chairman of the Joint Chiefs of Staff; 2007–2011	Succeeded by James A. Winnefeld, Jr.
Preceded by James O. Ellis	Commander, United States Strategic Command; 2004–2007	Succeeded by Kevin P. Chilton
