= Confidence Man: The Making of Donald Trump and the Breaking of America =

Non-fiction book about Donald Trump

- Author: Maggie Haberman
- Language: English
- Genre: non-fiction
- Publisher: Penguin Press
- Publication date: October 4, 2022
- Publication place: United States
- Pages: 608
- ISBN: 978-0-593-29734-6

Confidence Man: The Making of Donald Trump and the Breaking of America is a 2022 book by Maggie Haberman. It covers the career of Donald Trump and his presidency.

== Content ==
The first half of the book covers Trump's career before his candidacy for the presidency. Sean Wilentz observes that the book "places special emphasis on Trump's ascent in a late 1970s and 1980s New York demimonde of hustlers, mobsters, political bosses, compliant prosecutors and tabloid scandalmongers." The book covers Trump's close relationships with figures of that era including Ed Koch, George Steinbrenner, Roger Stone, Rupert Murdoch, Roger Ailes, Rudy Giuliani, Robert Morgenthau and especially his mentor, Roy Cohn. According to Joe Klein, Haberman describes how "Trump managed to gin his divorce from his first wife, Ivana, into a war between competing gossip columnists, Liz Smith and Cindy Adams," leading to coverage in the New York Daily News for 12 days straight.

Haberman portrays Trump as president as childlike, easily influenced by flattery, obsessed with trivialities, unwilling to engage with the details, and dismissive of advice. Accordingly, the executive branch was "subject to the president's whims and moods, his ideas about friends and enemies", and that he "reoriented an entire country to react to his moods and emotions". Haberman concludes that Trump is "a narcissistic drama-seeker who covered a fragile ego with a bullying impulse".

== Critical reception ==
Writing for Slate, reviewer Laura Miller concludes: "What Confidence Man offers its readers, as much of the pre-publication heralding of the book explains, is an in-depth portrait of Trump himself from a reporter who has covered him for years and who hails from the same New York City that formed him. The result is less a series of scoops and more an authoritative biography, a portrait of the man who transformed American politics."

In The Guardian, reviewer Peter Conrad wrote: "Haberman's book is chockablock with scoops, comprehensively leaked to the press before publication, but what singles it out from the competition is its perceptiveness about Trump's character and the way his private vices became public menaces. Officiating as a harassed shrink, Haberman diagnostically reviews Trump's early life, when his manias and self-delusions were already blatantly evident."

Eric Alterman's review in The American Prospect expressed surprise at the book's quality: "But lo and behold, Confidence Man: The Making of Donald Trump and the Breaking of America turns out to be a pleasant surprise. It's not merely a primary source for future historians but also, as both Sean Wilentz and Joe Klein noted in their respective reviews, a contextually reported story of Trump's rise that actually helps make sense of Trump, and shows how he bent both the Republican Party and the mainstream media to his will."

In his review for The Washington Post, Sean Wilentz described the book as a "uniquely illuminating portrait of our would-be maximum leader", adding: "Later generations of historians will puzzle over Trump's rise to national power. The best of them will have learned from Haberman's book that none of it would have been possible but for a social, cultural, political, media and moral breakdown that overtook New York beginning in the 1970s, a fiasco of trusted institutions that, having allowed the Trumpian virus to grow, failed at every step to contain its spread, then profited from, aided and even cheered its devastation."

Joe Klein reviewed the book for The New York Times and concluded: "No doubt, there are revelations aplenty here. But this is a book more notable for the quality of its observations about Trump's character than for its newsbreaks. It will be a primary source about the most vexing president in American history for years to come."

Haberman was criticized by some members of the news media, who alleged that she deliberately withheld some information so that it could be revealed for the first time by the book. In particular, critics highlighted a section in which Trump is described as refusing to leave the White House after losing the 2020 presidential election, a detail which was not publicly known until CNN obtained an excerpt of the book shortly before publication in September 2022. Haberman and representatives of the New York Times defended the decision, saying that she was unable to confirm that this and other incidents had occurred until after Trump had left office and his second impeachment trial had concluded.
