= The Perfect Weapon: War, Sabotage, and Fear in the Cyber Age =

English nonfiction book

- Author: David E. Sanger
- Language: English
- Genre: Non-fiction
- Publisher: Crown Publishing Group
- Publication date: 2018
- Publication place: United States
- Pages: 357
- ISBN: 978-0-451-49789-5

The Perfect Weapon: War, Sabotage, and Fear in the Cyber Age is a 2018 book by David E. Sanger. It discusses the evolution and concerns of cyber warfare, with a focus on the United States and its cyber capabilities.
