= David E. Sanger =

American journalist (born 1960)

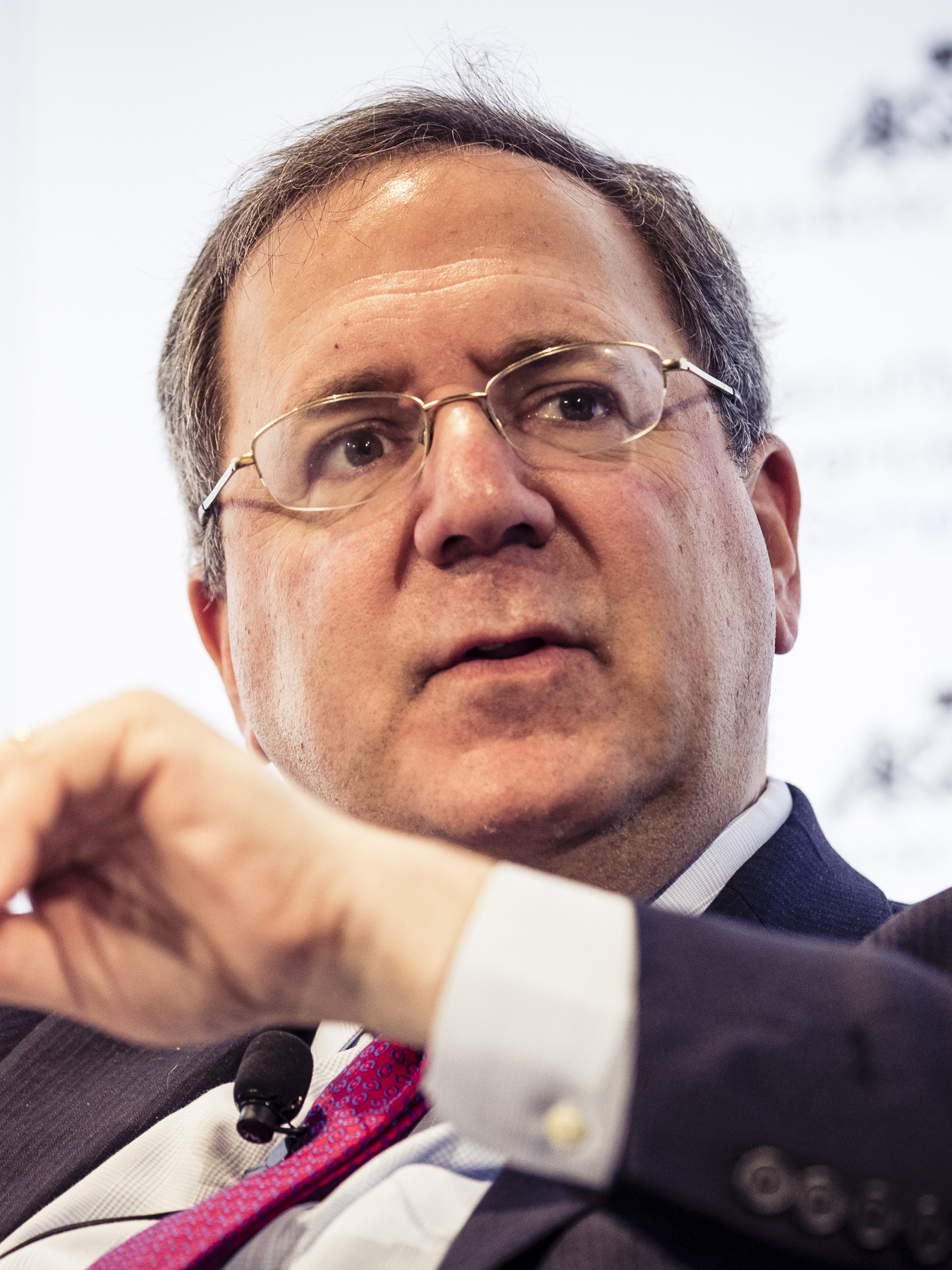
- Sanger during the MSC 2018
- Born: 1960 (age 65–66); White Plains, New York, U.S.
- Education: Harvard University (BA)
- Occupation: Journalist
- Employer: The New York Times
- Notable work: Confront and Conceal
- Title: Chief Washington Correspondent
- Spouse: Sherill Leonard
- Family: Elliott Sanger (grandfather)

David E. Sanger is an American journalist who is the chief Washington correspondent for The New York Times. He has been writing since 1982, covering foreign policy, globalization, nuclear proliferation, and the presidency. As of 2025 he has also authored four books on US foreign policy, including Confront and Conceal: Obama's Secret Wars and Surprising Use of American Power (2012). He has been a member of three teams that won the Pulitzer Prize, and has been awarded numerous honors for national security and foreign policy coverage.

== Early life and education ==
David E. Sanger is the son of Joan (née Samuels) and Kenneth E. Sanger. His mother worked as assistant coordinator in the White Plains Public School District and his father was a product manager for International Business Machines. His paternal grandfather was Elliott Sanger, a co-founder of WQXR-FM, the radio station of The New York Times; and his paternal grandmother was Eleanor Naumburg Sanger (grandniece of banker Elkan Naumburg), who served as program director of WQXR. He has one sister, Ellin Gail Sanger Agress.

He graduated from White Plains Senior High School in 1978. There, he was editor of The Orange, the student newspaper. He graduated magna cum laude in Government from Harvard College, where he was on the staff of The Harvard Crimson.

== New York Times career ==
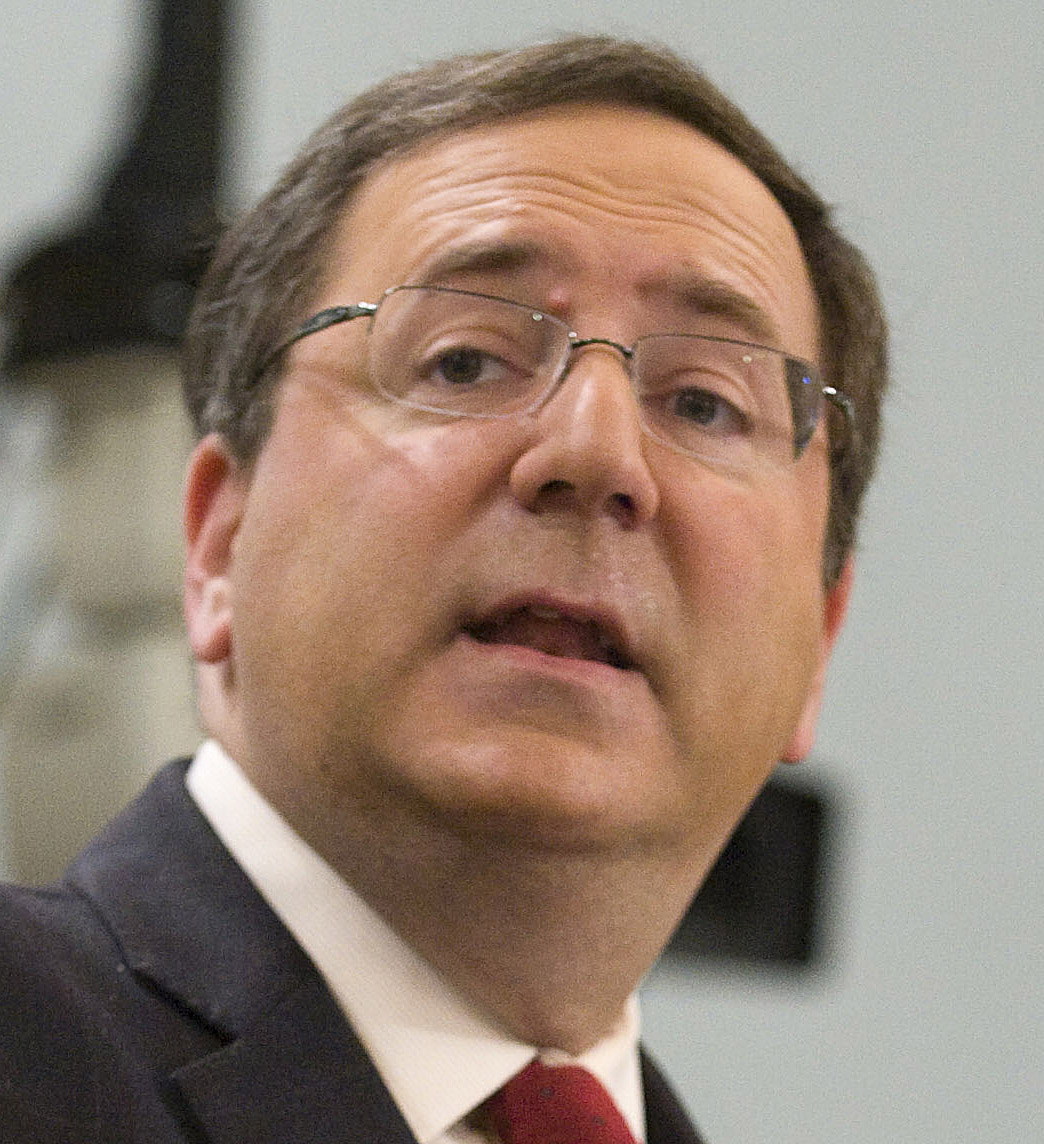
Sanger at the Miller Center, 2011

Sanger is chief Washington correspondent for The New York Times and one of the newspaper's senior writers. In a 42-year career at the paper, he has reported from New York, Tokyo, and Washington, specializing in foreign policy, national security, and the politics of globalization.

In 1982, after joining The New York Times, Sanger soon began specializing in the confluence of economic and foreign policy.

In 1986 Sanger played a major role in the team that investigated the causes of the Space Shuttle Challenger disaster. The team revealed the design flaws and bureaucratic troubles that contributed to the disaster and won the 1987 Pulitzer Prize for national reporting.

Throughout the '80s and '90s, he wrote extensively about how issues of national wealth and competitiveness came to redefine the relationships between the United States and its major allies.

Sanger was in Tokyo for six years, first as a foreign business and technology correspondent chronicling the sudden rise and crash of Japan’s economic bubble, and then bureau chief from 1994-1995 succeeding Steven R. Weisman, traveling widely in Asia. He wrote some of the first pieces describing North Korea’s nuclear weapons program, the rise and fall of Japan as one of the world's economic powerhouses, and China’s emerging role.

In 1994, he returned to Washington, as Chief Washington Economic Correspondent, and covered a series of global economic upheavals, from Mexico to the Asian economic crisis.

In March 1999, he was named a senior writer, and White House correspondent later that year.

In 2004, Sanger was awarded the Weintal Prize for diplomatic reporting for his coverage of the Iraq and Korea crises. He also won the Aldo Beckman prize for coverage of the presidency.

In both 2003 and 2007, Sanger was awarded the Merriman Smith Memorial Award for coverage of national security strategy. He also shared the American Society of Newspaper Editors' top award for deadline writing in 2004, for team coverage of the Columbia disaster. In 2007, The New York Times received the DuPont Award from the Columbia Journalism School for Nuclear Jihad: Can Terrorists Get the Bomb?, a documentary featuring him and colleague William J. Broad, and their investigation into the A.Q. Khan nuclear proliferation network. Their revelations in the Times about the network became a finalist for the Pulitzer Prize.

In 2011, Sanger was part of another team that was a Pulitzer Prize finalist for International Reporting for their coverage of the Japanese tsunami and nuclear disaster.

In 2012, Sanger broke the story that President Obama early in his presidency had secretly commissioned the Stuxnet cyberattacks on Iranian nuclear facilities; his reporting was depicted in the documentary film Zero Days (2016).

In October 2006, he was named Chief Washington Correspondent.

He was a member of a Pulitzer-winning team that wrote about the Clinton administration's struggles to control exports to China.

In a March 2016 interview, Sanger questioned Donald Trump, who was running for the Republican nomination for President of the United States, about his views on foreign policy. Sanger pressed Trump on the idea that his worldview was one of 'America First', a term first used in association with Trump in a report by the former U.S. diplomat Armand V. Cucciniello III in USA Today. Trump "agreed with a suggestion that his ideas might be summed up as 'America First'." His campaign quickly adopted the slogan as the cornerstone of Trump's foreign policy. The phrase was used throughout the Trump administration.

== Other activities ==
Sanger is also an adjunct lecturer in public policy at Harvard Kennedy School, where he is the first National Security and Press fellow at the school's Belfer Center for Science and International Affairs.

Sanger is a member of the Council on Foreign Relations and the Aspen Strategy Group.

== Works ==
As of 2024 Sanger has authored four books on US foreign policy.

In 2009, he published The Inheritance: The World Obama Confronts and the Challenges to American Power, based on his seven years as the Times White House correspondent, covering two wars, the confrontations with Iran, North Korea and other states that are described in Western media as "rogue" states, and America's efforts to deal with the rise of China.

Sanger's second book Confront and Conceal: Obama's Secret Wars and Surprising Use of American Power (2012) is an account of how Obama has dealt with those challenges, relying on innovative weapons (such as UAVs and cyberwarfare, such as Operation Olympic Games) and reconfigured tools of American power. In 2016, General James Cartwright, then the retired Vice Chairman of the Joint Chiefs of Staff, pleaded guilty to making false statements in connection with the unauthorized disclosure of classified information about the military use of the Stuxnet computer worm on the Natanz nuclear enrichment facility, some of which appeared in Confront and Conceal.

The Perfect Weapon: War, Sabotage, and Fear in the Cyber Age was published in 2018.

New Cold Wars: China's Rise, Russia's Invasion, and America's Struggle to Defend the West was published in 2024.

== Personal life ==
In June 1987, Sanger married his former Harvard classmate Sherill Ann Leonard in a non-denominational ceremony in the Memorial Church of Harvard University.
