= Jonathan Swan =

Australian and American journalist (born 1985)

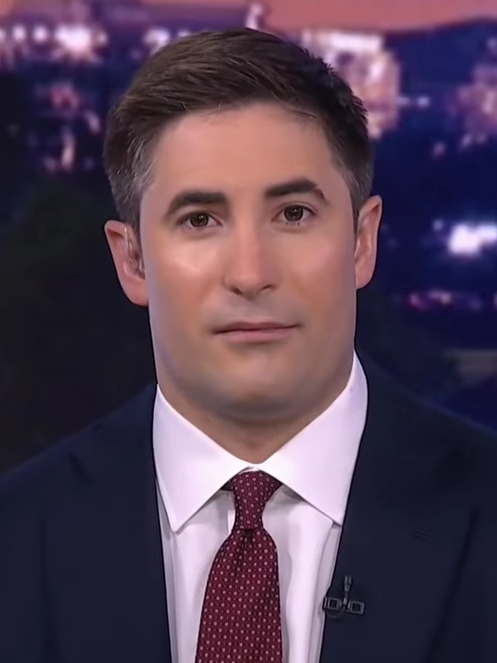
- Swan in 2018
- Born: August 7, 1985 (age 41); Sydney, New South Wales, Australia
- Citizenship: Australia; United States
- Occupation: Journalist
- Employer: The New York Times
- Spouse: Betsy Woodruff
- Children: 3
- Parents: Norman Swan (father); Lee Sutton (mother)

Jonathan Swan (born August 7, 1985) is an Australian and American investigative journalist at The New York Times. Raised in Sydney, Swan started out in journalism with Australian papers before immigrating to the United States. In 2016, he joined the newly founded media outlet Axios, covering US President Donald Trump's first administration. Swan broke several major stories and became a rising figure in political journalism, contributing to Axios's rise to prominence. But some of his reports, such as his 2018 interview with Trump, were called out for lacking insight and critique.

Swan interviewed Trump again in 2020 amid the COVID-19 pandemic. He drew media attention and acclaim for fact-checking Trump's falsehoods and constantly challenging his remarks, which, according to journalists, exposed the president as unprepared. His stunned facial expressions made in response to Trump's statements became a viral meme. A year later, Axios won the Emmy Award for Best Edited Interview for Swan's work.

Swan, who had been reporting on Trump's second administration, published a critical account of it with Maggie Haberman in 2026 titled Regime Change: Inside the Imperial Presidency of Donald Trump.

== Early life and career ==
Jonathan Swan was born on August 7, 1985, the eldest child of Lee Sutton and health reporter Norman Swan. Raised in Sydney, New South Wales, he grew up in a "very liberal" Reform Jewish household enrolled in the Emanuel Synagogue.

At age 25, Swan entered journalism covering politics for The Sydney Morning Herald. Around this time, he was a national political reporter for Fairfax Media. Swan became known for his scoops—most notably his revelations on parliamentarians abusing taxpayer funds and his unearthing a video of a senator hurling kangaroo feces at his brother. In 2014, as part of a fellowship with the American Political Science Association, Swan emigrated to the United States to work as a congressional aide in Washington, D.C. American politics intrigued him, and he had long aspired to venture into American journalism. After approaching several national media outlets, The Hill hired him.

== United States career ==
=== Beginnings ===
Swan began reporting on politics at The Hill in 2015. A year later, he joined Axios shortly before the company's founding, and it is at Axios that his career "accelerated", writes journalist Paul Farhi.

=== Donald Trump's first presidency ===
As a national political correspondent, Swan covered Trump's first administration from 2017 to 2021. He was the first to reveal the US' initial withdrawal from the Paris Climate Agreement, the US recognition of Jerusalem as the capital of Israel, and the firing of White House chief strategist Steve Bannon. Contemporary journalists regarded Swan's reporting as key to Axios's rise to prominence.

Swan's reports made him a rising influence in the journalistic scene, but his efforts roused controversy. Some commentators accused him of favoring "access over accountability" in light of his refusal to strongly challenge the White House's actions and, in Farhi's view, the lack of depth in his articles, with the one detailing the US recognition of Jerusalem as Israel's capital being just 55 words long. (Note: In actual fact, all Axios articles tend to be brief.) According to The New York Times, some held that "he irritates the White House, but rarely infuriates it". His paid speaking engagements, earning him as much as $25,000 per speech, also attracted criticism. In September 2018, Swan reported that Deputy Attorney General Rod Rosenstein had resigned, which caused a stir in the media. The report, however, was false. This damaged Axios's reputation, which had already been questioned owing to their articles' perceived shallowness. Nevertheless, Farhi observes that Swan's peers regarded him as a "rigorous and independent reporter".

==== First Trump interview (2018) ====
Swan in his 2018 interview with Donald Trump, as he grins exuberantly while inquiring the president on his plan to repeal birthright citizenship

Swan interviewed Trump in October 2018. In one preview clip, Trump revealed that he was planning to end birthright citizenship in the US, a constitutionally protected right. Swan did not challenge the president's claims, some of which were untrue; for example, when Trump falsely declared that no other country had birthright citizenship, Swan said nothing in response. Commentators also pointed out that Swan appeared gleeful and overexcited.

Swan faced stern backlash. Journalist Sam Biddle described the interview as "the ne plus ultra of media toadying" and Libby Watson deemed it "less a news story than … a press release". It only worsened Swan and Axios's reputation of favoring access over accountability. Shortly after the interview, Axios hired an editor to improve its reputation by lobbying for changes to the Wikipedia articles on itself and Swan; he pushed for promotional material to be included, such as an "Awards and Honors" section, and recommended that controversies related to Swan be whitewashed. Conversely, veteran journalist Bob Woodward argued that he was not soft—he was "tough but fair". Swan regretted his performance.

==== Second Trump interview (2020) ====
Two years later, Swan interviewed Trump again. The interview lasted 38 minutes and aired on Axios's HBO series on August 3, 2020. The US was then engulfed in the COVID-19 pandemic that had killed upward of 100,000 Americans as well as nationwide protests over the murder of George Floyd. This time, Swan's approach was more critical. He pointedly challenged and spotlit the president's false and misleading statements throughout. When Trump, for example, described the pandemic as being "under control", Swan responded, "How? A thousand Americans are dying a day."

Swan in his 2020 interview with Donald Trump, as he gives a befuddled expression in response to the president's statements

According to commentators, Swan managed to challenge Trump by deploying an aggressive line of follow-up questions. When Trump ambiguously said, "people say…", Swan replied, "Which people?". The president often could not answer such questions. Daniel Dale of CNN wrote that, in his interviews, Trump would state one false claim after the other in a "hit-and-run" strategy, and interviewers would generally let them pass. However, Swan kept asking "how?", "what?", and "who?", which thwarted Trump's strategy. Journalist David Brody asserted that while Trump often dominated interviews by "commandeering" them, Swan humbled him. This left Trump stumbling through responses as he appeared baffled and unprepared.

Swan was also noted for his facial expressions made in reaction to some of Trump's claims. They shifted between confusion, fury, bemusement, and bewilderment. Beyond the pandemic, commentators pointed out that Swan exposed the president's unwillingness to praise the recently deceased civil rights activist John Lewis as well as his doubling down on "wish[ing] [Ghislaine Maxwell] well" after her arrest for abetting child prostitution. The interview was widely praised, with The New York Times' Ben Smith suggesting it was "the best interview of Mr Trump's term". Commentators noted Swan's efforts at fact-checking Trump; his approach, they argued, ensured that the president was kept accountable. For his work, Axios was awarded the 2021 Emmy Award for Best Edited Interview. The interview proved a media and internet sensation, and Swan's stunned facial expressions became a viral meme.

==== "Off the Rails" ====
Shortly before the 2020 presidential election between incumbent president Trump and Joe Biden, Swan revealed what he understood as Trump's plans to claim victory regardless of the outcome, forming part of his wider plan to overturn the results. A few months later, he documented the president's plan and efforts in a nine-part (Note: A tenth bonus article (or episode) is also included in the series.) series titled "Off the Rails". (Note: "Off the Rails" was coproduced with Zachary Basu.) The series won Swan the 2022 White House Correspondents' Association's Aldo Beckman Award for Overall Excellence in White House Coverage.

=== Later efforts ===
I see my role in every interview as the representative of the people in that chair. ... What would regular people want to know and want me to do in that situation? And I think that when you're interviewing a president of the United States, you want to find the balance between letting them explain themselves and not cutting in every two seconds, but finding moments that are really important to puncture the bubble.

— Swan on interviewing the US president, from a July 2026 interview

In January 2023, after six years reporting for Axios, Swan joined The New York Times, focusing on congressional Republicans. He now covers Trump's second administration and has reported on his 2024 campaign and 2026 war against Iran.

He published Regime Change: Inside the Imperial Presidency of Donald Trump with fellow New York Times journalist Maggie Haberman in June 2026. Sourced from their reporting and over a thousand interviews with people close to Trump and his government, it studies the first year of Trump's second administration and presents it as one of insatiable, erratic exercise of power, venality, disinterest in morality, and tireless fealty to the president and his personal wishes; actions such as the toppling of Nicolás Maduro and Trump's lavish White House renovations, as Swan understands them, manifest his urge to become a great man of history. The book met good reviews. According to an Axios report, it will be the year's bestselling nonfiction book.

== Personal life ==
Swan is married to fellow reporter Betsy Woodruff of Politico; they have three children. He became an American citizen in 2024.
