= Perfect Weapon (TV series) =

- Starring: Monty Halls; Stuart Prior
- Narrated by: Craig Kelly
- Country of origin: United Kingdom
- Original language: English
- No. of episodes: 7

Production
- Running time: 60 mins

Original release
- Network: National Geographic Channel

Perfect Weapon is a British TV series for the National Geographic Channel. It features the two hosts: ex-Royal Marine Monty Halls and archaeologist and medieval weapons expert Stuart Prior choosing a weapon for the current episode's category.

Medieval weapons of the same type (such as rifles and cannons or mangonels and trebuchets) are compared and tested in rate of fire, how easy it is to make and to use, fatality (usually using a pig carcass), overall power, accuracy etc. The weapon which would win most of the rounds in the end is deemed the perfect weapon for the category.
