= Maggie Haberman =

American journalist (born 1973)

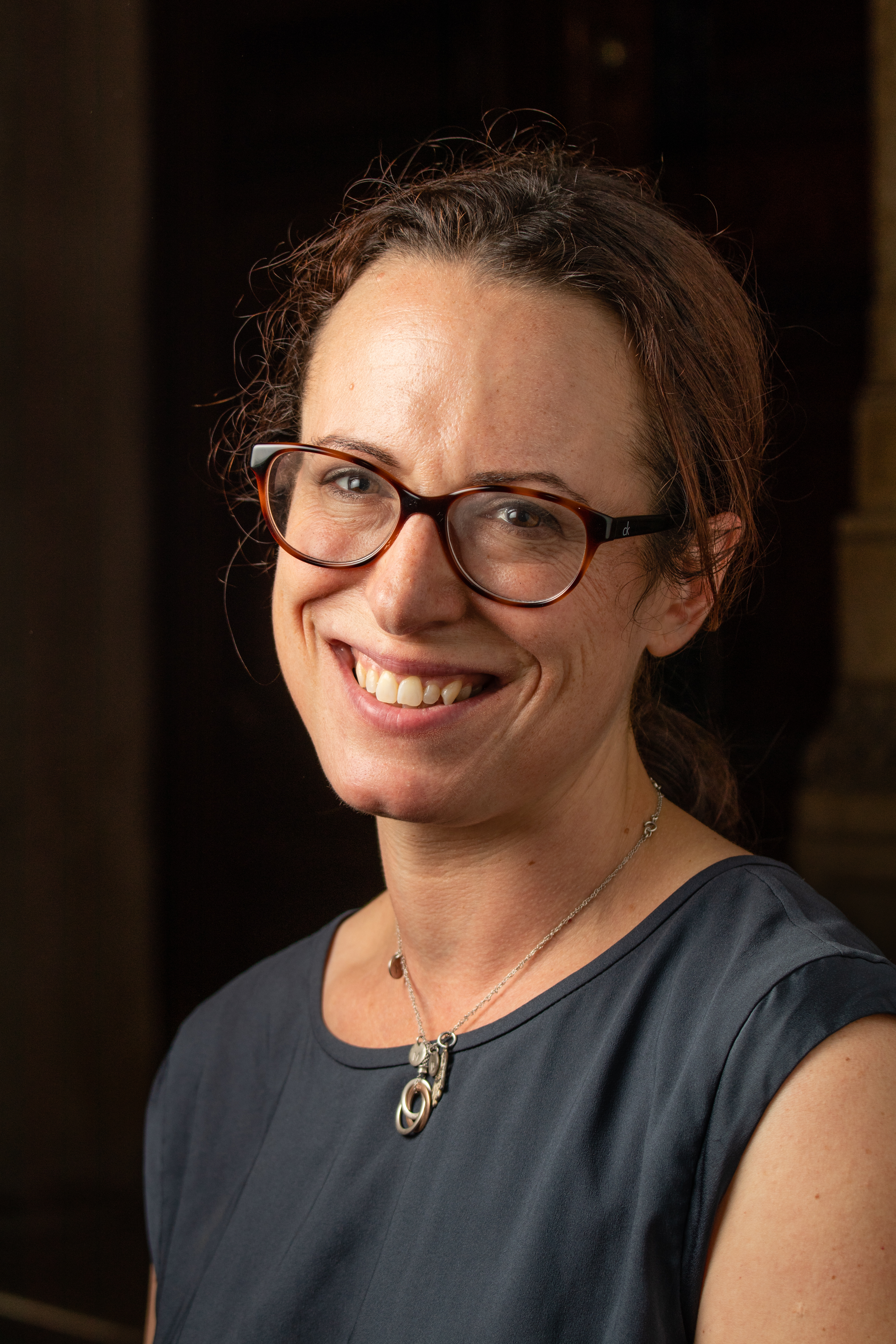
- Haberman in 2018
- Born: Maggie Lindsy Haberman; October 30, 1973 (age 52); New York City, U.S.
- Education: Sarah Lawrence College (BA)
- Years active: 1995–present
- Spouse: Dareh Ardashes Gregorian (m. 2003)
- Children: 3
- Relatives: Clyde Haberman (father); Vartan Gregorian (father-in-law)
- Awards: Pulitzer Prize for National Reporting; Aldo Beckman Award for Journalistic Excellence; Front Page Award

Maggie Lindsy Haberman (born October 30, 1973) is an American journalist, a White House correspondent for The New York Times, and a political analyst for CNN. She previously worked as a political reporter for the New York Post, the New York Daily News, and Politico. She wrote about Donald Trump for those publications and rose to prominence covering his campaign, first presidency, and inter-presidency for the Times. In 2022, she published the best-selling book Confidence Man: The Making of Donald Trump and the Breaking of America. In 2026, she and Jonathan Swan published the best-selling book Regime Change: Inside the Imperial Presidency of Donald Trump.

== Early life and education ==
Haberman was born on October 30, 1973, in New York City, the daughter of Clyde Haberman, who became a longtime journalist for The New York Times, and Nancy Haberman (née Spies), a media communications executive at Rubenstein Associates. At that firm, a "publicity powerhouse" whose eponymous founder has been called "the dean of damage control" by Rudy Giuliani, Haberman's mother worked for a client list of influential New Yorkers including Donald Trump. Haberman is a 1991 graduate of Ethical Culture Fieldston School, followed by Sarah Lawrence College where she earned a bachelor's degree in 1995. She is of Jewish descent.

== Career ==
Haberman's career began in 1996 when she was hired by the New York Post. In 1999, the Post assigned her to cover City Hall, where she became "hooked" on political reporting. Haberman worked for the Post's rival newspaper, the New York Daily News, for three and a half years in the early 2000s, where she continued to cover City Hall. Haberman returned to the Post to cover the 2008 U.S. presidential campaign and other political races. In 2010, Haberman was hired by Politico as a senior reporter. She became a political analyst for CNN in 2014.

Haberman was hired by The New York Times in early 2015 as a political correspondent for the 2016 U.S. presidential campaign. According to one commentator, Haberman "formed a potent journalistic tag team with Glenn Thrush".

In January 2020, attorneys representing Nick Sandmann announced that Haberman was one of many media personalities they were suing for defamation for her coverage of the 2019 Lincoln Memorial confrontation.

Her reporting style as a White House correspondent for the Times features in the Liz Garbus documentary series The Fourth Estate.

According to an analysis by British digital strategist Rob Blackie, Haberman was one of the most commonly followed political writers among Biden administration staff on Twitter.

=== Reporting on Trump ===
Haberman frequently broke news about the Trump campaign and administration. In March 2016 Haberman, along with New York Times reporter David E. Sanger, questioned Trump in an interview, "Donald Trump Expounds on His Foreign Policy Views," during which he "agreed with a suggestion that his ideas might be summed up as 'America First,'" a term first used in association with Trump in an op-ed by the former U.S. diplomat Armand Cucciniello.

In October 2016, one month before Donald Trump defeated Hillary Clinton in the US presidential election, a stolen document released by Guccifer 2.0 outlined how Clinton's campaign could induce Haberman to place sympathetic stories in Politico. However, contrary to the hopes of her campaign, subsequent stories by Haberman about Clinton were much more critical of her than they had hoped for. Haberman was criticized for applying a double standard in her reporting about the scandals involving the two presidential candidates of the 2016 election. Haberman and The New York Times disproportionately covered Hillary Clinton's email controversy with many more articles critical of her than of the numerous scandals involving her competitor Donald Trump, including his sexual misconduct allegations, with Taylor Link writing: "The NYT's White House reporter calls the Clinton campaign liars, but was hesitant to use that word with Trump."

Haberman has been credited with becoming "the highest-profile reporter" to cover Trump's campaign and presidency, as well as "the most-cited journalist in the Mueller report". Her critics accuse her of giving a passive slant favorable to the Trump White House, and she has also been accused "from certain corners of the left as a supposed water carrier for the 45th president".

In 2022, Haberman published a book on the Trump presidency called Confidence Man: The Making of Donald Trump and the Breaking of America. In advance of its release, CNN published an excerpt revealing that Trump planned to remain in the White House after his November 2020 election loss. A Guardian review of the book describes her as "the New York Times' Trump whisperer", and describes the book as "much more than 600 pages of context, scoop and drama....it gives Trump and those close to him plenty of voice – and rope." The book debuted at number one on The New York Times nonfiction best-seller list for the week ending October 8, 2022. Journalists and authors criticized Haberman for allegedly choosing to withhold information about Donald Trump for the sake of her book, despite being aware of it ahead of the January 6 United States Capitol attack, although they presented no evidence of when she had learned of Trump's statements.

=== Awards and honors ===
In 2018, Haberman's reporting on the Trump administration earned the Pulitzer Prize for National Reporting (shared with colleagues at the Times and The Washington Post), the individual Aldo Beckman Award for Journalistic Excellence award from the White House Correspondents' Association, and the Front Page Award for Journalist of the Year from the Newswomen's Club of New York.

== Personal life ==
In 2003 Haberman married Dareh Ardashes Gregorian, a reporter for the New York Daily News, formerly of the New York Post, and the son of academic and historian Vartan Gregorian. They have three children and live in Brooklyn.

== Bibliography ==
=== Books and chapters ===
- Haberman, Maggie & Jeane MacIntosh (2003). Held Captive: The Kidnapping and Rescue of Elizabeth Smart. New York: Avon Books.
- Flegenheimer, Matt & Haberman, Maggie (2016). "Foul-mouthed and proud of it on the '16 campaign trail". In Wilson, H. W. (ed.). Campaign Trends and Election Law. Amenia, NY: Grey House Publishing.
- Haberman, Maggie (2022). Confidence Man: The Making of Donald Trump and the Breaking of America. New York: Penguin Press. ISBN 978-0593297346.
- Haberman, Maggie; Swan, Jonathan (2026). Regime Change: Inside the Imperial Presidency of Donald Trump. New York: Simon & Schuster. ISBN 978-1668067246.

=== Critical studies and reviews of Haberman's work ===
Confidence man

- Moses, Paul (February 2023). "All mirrors". Commonweal. 150 (2): 54–55. (Note: Online version is titled "Donald Trump's New York".)

———————

Bibliography notes
