= Timeline of the second Trump presidency (2026 Q3) =

The following is a timeline of the second presidency of Donald Trump during the third quarter of 2026, from July 1, 2026, to September 30, 2026. To navigate between quarters, see timeline of the Donald Trump presidencies. For the Q4 timeline see timeline of the second Trump presidency (2026 Q4).

== Timeline ==
=== July 2026 ===
Date	Events	Photos/videos
Wednesday July 1	President Trump makes his first flight aboard the new Air Force One, that Trump aides requested be gifted by the Qatari government, to visit North Dakota.; President Trump attends the grand opening of the Theodore Roosevelt Presidential Library.; President Trump called FIFA president Gianni Infantino and requested a review of the red card issued to US national team striker Folarin Balogun. FIFA announced on July 5 that Balogun's red card had been reversed allowing him to play in the knockout match the next day.	President Trump arriving in North Dakota as his first flight aboard the new Air Force One. President Trump attends the grand opening of the Theodore Roosevelt Presidential Library.
Thursday July 2	US District Judge Ana Reyes demands that the Trump administration commit to not renovate the historic East Potomac Golf Links prior to the matter being settled in court.; Press Secretary Karoline Leavitt claims that some of Gen Z was turning to socialism because they were lazy, during a interview with Fox News Jesse Watters.	
Friday July 3	President Trump kicks off the US 250th birthday celebrations with a speech at Mount Rushmore that The Guardian described as "an extraordinary partisan attack", featuring anti-immigrant themes and portraying Democrats as communists.; Second Lady Usha Vance posted an episode of her Storytime with the Second Lady where she and President Trump read a picture book to children to promote children's literacy. During the reading Trump provided commentary on the prior residents depicted in the book.	President Trump speaks at the Mount Rushmore fireworks celebrations event.
Saturday July 4	President Trump's 2026 Salute to America occurs on Independence Day in Washington, D.C., in addition to other events.; Vice President JD Vance celebrated the Fourth of July and spoke aboard the USS Kearsarge moored in the New York Harbor in the Hudson River.; Hundreds of masked men, potentially led by Thomas Rousseu founder of the white supremacy organization Patriot Front, marched through Washington D.C.	President Trump speaks at the Salute to America event.
Sunday July 5	President Trump posted an AI-image of prior President and First Lady Obama waving as they boarded an Air Force One spray-painted with graffiti, reading "Obama", "Yes We Can", "BLM", and the phrase praise be to God written in Arabic.	
Monday July 6	President Trump announced the construction of a new granite helipad on the White House South Lawn through a donation by Sikorsky Aircraft, to accommodate new more powerful presidential choppers.	
Tuesday July 7	President Trump attends the NATO summit.; President Trump announced the lifting of sanctions on Turkey and decide about potential sales of F-35s to Ankara at the start of a meeting with Turkish president Tayyip Erdogan at the NATO summit.; A woman alleging she was denied entry to an event where Vice President Vance was speaking filed suit alleging denial of entry after following proper registration, due to her cat-themed social media accounts that mock the Vice President.; The White House announced the installation of 25 Freedom Fuel gas stations in the greater Philadelphia region, all seeing gas at $3.47 a gallon, while the national average was about $3.79.	Group photo of NATO leaders before a dinner at Presidential Palace in Ankara
Wednesday July 8	Responding to Israeli intelligence saying he had been targeted for assassination by Iran, Trump announces he is flying from Turkey on Air Force One instead of the Qatari plane he arrived in. While boarding, Trump is secretly removed from the plane inside a catering container and brought to a military plane. White House staff and journalists on Air Force Once are not informed of the switch or the fact that they remained as decoys to the threat.; Secretary of Defense Pete Hegseth canceled a planned visit to Israel where he was to meet with Prime Minister Benjamin Netanyahu and Defense Secretary Israel Katz. Hegseth is attending the NATO summit with Trump.; Vice President Vance spoke at the Wisconsin National Guard facility at the Milwaukee Mitchell International Airport, along with Dr. Mehmet Oz, the administrator for the US Centers for Medicare and Medicaid Services.	President Trump and NATO leaders President Trump participates in a press conference.
Thursday July 9	Palm Beach International Airport in West Palm Beach, Florida, is officially renamed President Donald J. Trump International Airport following legislation signed by Florida Governor Ron DeSantis.; President Trump signs a proclamation under Section 232 of the Trade Expansion Act of 1962 directing the Commerce Department and United States Trade Representative to negotiate agreements with foreign countries to address imports of commercial aircraft, jet engines, and aircraft and engine parts that his administration determined threatened U.S. national security. The proclamation does not immediately impose tariffs on the imports.; The Trump administration announces $277 million in funding for the High Intensity Drug Trafficking Areas program, described by the White House as the largest investment in the program's history, to support federal, state, local, Tribal, and territorial law-enforcement efforts against drug-trafficking organizations and illicit fentanyl.	
Friday July 10	Air Force Two landed at Louisville's Muhammad Ali International Airport, and Vice President Vance reportedly visited Valhalla Golf Club.; It was reported that FBI Director Kash Patel was summoned to Washington by White House officials over alleged conduct concerns. In a social media post Patel confirmed he had been at the White House but the reported reasons were false.	
Saturday July 11	Senator Lindsey Graham dies of cardiac arrest at the age of 71.; It was reported that Vice President Vance has begun leasing an additional residence at Wolver Hill Farm, a 500 acre property in Middleburg, Virginia. The home is reportedly for his wife and children, and owned by Charles Kuhn, the founder of a longtime government contractor and one of the largest landholders in Virginia.	
Sunday July 12		
Monday July 13	President Trump announced that the US will impose fees at a 20% rate on all cargo shipped in the Strait of Hormuz, and called the US the "guardian" of the route. He also announced the reintroduction of the blockade of Iranian ports starting on July 14.; US District Judge Kathleen Williams rules that President Trump and his lawyers filed his lawsuit against the IRS for an "improper purpose" and characterizes the suit as an exercise in self-dealing.; A Colombian man was shot and killed by ICE agents in Biddeford, Maine. The man reportedly tried to flee the scene in a vehicle and was authorized to work in the US with a social security number.; President Trump announced the intent to scale back Bears Ears and Grand Staircase-Escalante national monuments in Utah under the Antiquities Act.	President Trump signs an executive order. President Trump participates in a Freedom 250 Grand Prix showcase.
Tuesday July 14	After several setbacks in court, the Trump administration rescinds its attempt to freeze $10 billion in childcare and family assistance funding for California, Colorado, Illinois, Minnesota and New York.; President Trump holds a bilateral meeting with Iraqi Prime Minister Ali al-Zaidi at the White House.	President Trump and Iraqi Prime Minister Ali al-Zaidi
Wednesday July 15	President Trump praised ICE on Truth Social and opposed his administrations pausing of the traffic stop tactic following two deadly shooting within a week involving ICE traffic stops.; Acting Attorney General Todd Blanche was questioned during his ongoing confirmation hearing, at one point stating "I'm his lawyer" when questioned about his relationship with President Trump.; Defense Secretary Pete Hegseth unveiled plans for a new testosterone deficiency among troops aged 30 and older to ensure the right testosterone levels to operate at peak efficiency.; The Trump administration filed a first-ever petition to the Alien Terrorist Removal Court against an unnamed individual.; While speaking with Joe Rogan, Vice President Vance claimed the Trump administration had mishandled the communications surrounding the Epstein files and its contents, placing the majority of the blame on former Attorney General Pam Bondi.; Two US advocacy groups sued the Trump administration alleging the sanctions targeting Palestinian rights organizations, International Criminal Court officials and a UN expert have unlawfully violated the US first amendment.	
Thursday July 16	President Trump addresses the nation regarding his widely discredited claims of fraud in the 2020 election, presenting no evidence.; Thomas Massie introduces a bill called "the Epstein Files Transparency Act II" aimed at holding the DOJ accountable for its handling of the files.; Reports emerge that Trump's teleprompter operator has been put on administrative lead for allegedly using his access to the president's remarks to win over $100,000 on Kalshi.; The Department of Homeland Security announced the finalization of a rule to limit the duration of F- visas for students, J-visas for exchange visitors and I-visas for journalists.	President Trump delivers an address to the nation.
Friday July 17	US Homeland Security Secretary Markwayne Mullin doubled down on President Trump's unsubstantiated claims of election fraud, raising claims that some 250,000 noncitizens had voted in California, Pennsylvania, New Jersey and Nevada.; The US Department of Interior announced the cancelation of automatic protections for imperiled animals and modifications to other aspects of the Endangered Species Act to allow for ease of access to mining and drilling.	
Saturday July 18	President Trump approved Texas's major disaster declaration, as announced by FEMA following widespread flooding in over 28 counties, including Uvalde, Kerr and Kendall counties.	
Sunday July 19	President and First Lady Trump attend and watch the 2026 FIFA World Cup final between Spain and Argentina in East Rutherford, New Jersey.; Vice President Vance and Second Lady Usha Vance's fourth child, Alec Neel Vance, is born, making Vice President Vance the first sitting Vice President to have a child while in office since Schuyler Colfax in 1870.	Two of Vice President Vance's children with their baby brother, Alec Neel Vance.
Monday July 20	President Trump imposed 50% tariffs on most Canadian goods, and raised claims that Canada had discriminated against American autos, alcohol, and dairy products.	President Trump participates in a FIFA World Cup trophy ceremony.
Tuesday July 21	President Trump holds a bilateral meeting with Lebanese President Joseph Aoun at the White House.	President Trump and Lebanese President Joseph Aoun
Wednesday July 22	The Trump administration signs a deal with Saudi Arabia that officials say could allow the country to enrich fuel for nuclear reactors.; President Trump attends the dignified transfer of U.S. soldiers killed in Iranian strikes in the Middle East at Dover Air Force Base in Delaware.; President Trump delivers remarks on Trump Accounts at Wheeler High School in Marietta, Georgia.	President Trump attends a dignified transfer. President Trump gaggles with the press at Joint Base Andrews. President Trump delivers remarks.
Thursday July 23	President Trump receives the 2025 World Series Champions, the Los Angeles Dodgers, at the White House.	President Trump hosts the Los Angeles Dodgers, 2025 World Series Champions.
Friday July 24	President Trump makes an announcement on American nuclear innovation in the Oval Office.; President Trump attends the White House Correspondents' Association dinner at the Waldorf Astoria in Washington, D.C., which was re-scheduled after gunshots were fired at the original event in April.	President Trump makes an announcement on American nuclear innovation. President Trump delivers remarks.
Saturday July 25		
Sunday July 26		
Monday July 27	President Trump tours and delivers remarks at General Motors Proving Ground in Milford, Michigan.	President Trump participates in a tour and gift ceremony. President Trump delivers remarks.
Tuesday July 28	President Trump holds a bilateral meeting with Ukrainian President Volodymyr Zelenskyy at the White House.; President Trump holds a bilateral meeting with Israeli Prime Minister Benjamin Netanyahu at the White House.; President Trump attends the funeral of late senator Lindsey Graham at Washington National Cathedral.	President Trump and Ukrainian President Volodymyr Zelenskyy President Trump and Israeli Prime Minister Benjamin Netanyahu
Wednesday July 29	Dr. Anthony Fauci spoke in front of the Senate Homeland Security and Governmental Affairs Committee, where Fauci repeatedly invoked his Fifth Amendment right. Senator Rand Paul claimed Fauci was obstructing an investigation of Congress and would suffer repercussions before instructing security to remove Fauci's lawyer after he began to speak.	President Trump makes an announcement with Secretary of Transportation Sean Duffy. Dr. Anthony Fauci spoke in front of the Senate Homeland Security and Governmental Affairs Committee.
Thursday July 30	The Bureau of Economic Analysis reported that the US economy slowed to a 1.5% growth rate in the second quarter.	
Friday July 31	President Trump holds his first ever televised cabinet meeting at Camp David.; The Justice Department asked for a dismissal of charges against former US Olympian David Hearn citing evidence of "botched installation by contractors" instead of vandalism to the Lincoln Memorial Reflecting Pool.; Capital One entered a motion to dismiss a lawsuit from the Trump Organization over the banks closure of their accounts, stating they had clear evidence the accounts were closed for anti-money laundering reasons.	President Trump holds his first ever televised cabinet meeting at Camp David.

=== August 2026 ===
Date	Events	Photos/videos
Saturday August 1	The Trump Media & Technology Group debut a subscription service called "Trump API" which would provide businesses with faster access to posts by Trump, Vice President Vance and other high-profile accounts for fees up of $100,000 a month. Critics call the service "brazen corruption" and note it may violate insider trading laws.	
Sunday August 2	Following measles outbreaks and reported infections at numbers not seen in the past 35 years, Health Secretary Robert Kennedy Jr tells American parents that they should vaccinate their children against measles.; While speaking with CNN's State of the Union with Dana Bash, Health Secretary Robert Kennedy Jr criticized Dr Anthony Fauci and blamed him for the Covid-19 pandemic lockdowns while downplaying the virus and its impacts.	President Trump gaggles with press on Air Force One during a trip to Joint Base Andrews.
Monday August 3	President Trump rebukes US Attorney for DC Jeanine Pirro dropping the Lincoln Memorial Reflecting Pool vandalism cases, claiming Pirro had "choked".; US Attorney for DC Jeanine Pirro meets with President Trump at the White House with a box full of evidence to prove the reasoning for dropping the Lincoln Memorial Reflecting pool vandalism cases.; Following reports of windfall profits for Exxon and Chevron, President Trump states he did not like the fact that oil companies were making so much money in response to the ongoing Iran War.	President Trump signs an executive order.
Tuesday August 4		
Wednesday August 5	U.S. District Judge Maame Ewusi-Mensah Frimpong holds the Department of Homeland Security in contempt of court for failing to comply with a court order to produce cell phone records for discovery. The judge imposes a fine of $500 per day on the government until it complies with the order.; President Trump delivers remarks at Red Rock Casino Resort and Spa.	President Trump delivers remarks.
Thursday August 6		
Friday August 7		
Saturday August 8		
Sunday August 9		
Monday August 10	President Trump signs an executive order moving to reduce the number of recommended childhood vaccines in the Oval Office, citing a rise in autism in the United States as his reasoning.; President Trump attends the swearing in of Todd Blanche as Attorney General in the Oval Office by Judge Emil Bove.; Defense Secretary Pete Hegseth requested funding from Congress to rename Joint Base Charleston as Joint Base Lindsey Graham.	President Trump signs an executive order regarding childhood vaccines in the Oval Office. Blanche is sworn in as attorney general
Tuesday August 11	Four human rights groups sued the Trump administration in the Southern District of New York alleging that the administration is illegally sanctioning ICC prosecutors and judges, a UN human rights expert, and three Palestinian human rights groups.; The Centers for Medicare and Medicaid Services issued a update rule prohibiting federal Medicaid or Children's Health Insurance Program funds for certain gender-affirming care services for young people.; President Trump attended the medaling ceremony for the Patriot Games in Geneva, Ohio at SPIRE Academy.	
Wednesday August 12	President Trump announced the resignation of Press Secretary Karoline Leavitt at the end of the August 2026 to spend more time with her family. Leavitt will also act as an outside adviser for the administration.; The Trump administration announced a program that could authorize some US businesses to pursue government-selected foreign cyber criminals, taking over work previously done by government agencies.	
Thursday August 13	US District Judge Richard G Stearns dismissed a Trump administration lawsuit alleging that Harvard University turned a blind eye to harassment of Jewish students, stating the suit failed to prove an ongoing violation of federal civil rights laws.; Vice President Vance sent the Justice Department a report by the Department of Health and Human Services alleging hospitals of billing fraud in connection to transgender health care procedures.; While speaking on Fox News The Will Cain Show, Vice President Vance told GOP members that they must persuade young voters of accept responsibility for the rise in younger voters interest in socialism due to ongoing economic concerns.; It was reported that ICE officers are to be outfitted with shock gloves as distraction and de-escalation devices drawing criticism from Democratic legislatures and civil rights advocates.	
Friday August 14	US District Judge Richard Leon denied a motion to block the Trump administration from building 62 miles of boarder wall along part of the Tohono Oʼodham Nation's reservation without its consent.; The Trump administration requested that the Supreme Court for an emergency stay of injunction to allow for the continuation of above ground construction on the White House ballroom while litigation plays out.; President Trump tours and delivers remarks at the David S. Mack Center for Training and Intelligence.; Responding to concerns about mental health and supply issues due to the record setting deployment of the USS Abraham Lincoln aircraft carrier, Trump tells reporters that the 260-day deployment is "not nearly long enough."; In a speech in NY, Trump tells Americans to accept slightly higher gas prices as ‌the cost of preventing Iran from obtaining a nuclear weapon.	President Trump delivers remarks.
Saturday August 15	The New York Times reports that over 200,000 Canadians have signed a petition calling for the Canadian Parliament to declare Pete Hoekstra as a persona non grata, and have him removed as the United States ambassador to Canada.	
Sunday August 16	Democratic legislatures demanded answers from the Trump administration about reported conditions onboard the USS Abraham Lincoln, following reports about its ongoing 9 month deployment.; US envoy and son-in-law of President Trump, Jared Kushner, Board of Peace members and other representatives met with Hamas chief Khalil al-Hayya in Egypt to push for Gaza disarmament.; While speaking with NBC Meet the Press Kristen Welker, US Attorney General Todd Blanche refused to confirm that the Justice Department would always act independently of the White House and President Trump.; President Trump instructed the Pentagon to "substantially reduce" joint military exercises with South Korea due to costs and Korea's refusal to act against Iran.; Responding in a speech to the news that Trump aide Natalie Harp was among the few secretly escorted off a targeted Air Force One, Senator Jon Ossoff remarks that Trump "doesn't want to do the job. He wants to build his ballroom and travel with Natalie on their apparently defenseless flying palace gifted by the emir of Qatar." The line and the administration's fierce response brought widespread media attention to Harp and her unusual relationship to Donald Trump.	Natalie Harp in the Oval Office, September 9, 2025
Monday August 17	The Supreme Court rejected to hear President Trump's petition to challenge the verdict of the E. Jean Carroll case where he was found liable for sexually abusing and defaming Carroll.; Politico reports that Trump voted by mail in the Florida Republican primary, even as he continues to disparage mail-in voting with warnings and allegations of fraud.; US envoy Jared Kushner spoke with Israeli Prime Minister Benjamin Netanyahu, after Israel rejected the US backed Gaza ceasefire plan.; President Trump meets with 16-year-old lifeguard Ryder Williams, 10-year-old Nathaniel Rai, and their families and Santa Cruz officials in the Oval Office. Williams rescued Rai from rough surf at Seabright State Beach in Santa Cruz, California on July 25, 2026.	President Trump meets with 16-year-old lifeguard Ryder Williams, 10-year-old Nathaniel Rai, and their families and Santa Cruz officials in the Oval Office.
Tuesday August 18	One week after warning the Smithsonian Institution that they will require its museums to change any content the administration finds problematic, Trump accuses the Smithsonian on Tuesday of focusing too much on "how bad slavery was."	
Wednesday August 19	Secretary of Transportation Sean Duffy's reality show starring himself and his family, The Great American Road Trip, debuts after a long delay. The show was criticized for possible ethics violations stemming from funding from corporations Duffy regulates. The series is widely panned.	
Thursday August 20	First Lady Melania Trump announces a new partnership for her "Be Best Fostering the Future" initiative with IndyCar and Fox Sports as sponsors for scholarships at Indiana University and Purdue University.	First Lady Melania Trump in the Rose Garden promoting her sponsors Fox Sports and IndyCar for her "Be Best Fostering the Future" initiative
Friday August 21	Canadian Prime Minister Mark Carney announces that Canada has suspended trade negotiations with the U.S., citing what he called "last-minute changes" that he described as "unfair."; The Supreme Court of the United States temporarily allows construction on the White House ballroom to resume as the justices decide whether a judge wrongly paused the project.; President Trump announces a plan to temporarily lower tariff rates on some imported ground beef, with up to 300,000 metric tons of product to be imported without out of quota tariff.; Vice President Vance speaks to supporters as part of the Trump administration "America First" economic agenda in Middletown and Cincinnati, Ohio.; In a speech in South Carolina, Trump refers to the Strait of Hormuz as an "American territory."	
Saturday August 22	Trump's 50% tariffs on approximately $28 billion of Canadian goods are put in place at 12:01 a.m. ET. The administration claimed the authority under Section 338 of the Tariff Act of 1930, also known as the Smoot–Hawley Tariff Act, a provision that the US has never invoked before.	
Sunday August 23	President Trump and First Lady Melania Trump attend the Freedom 250 Grand Prix.	
Monday August 24	Vice President Vance spoke to supporters in Brewer, Maine where he spoke about the ICE shooting of Johan Sebastian Duran Guerrero and that people should have more perspective on the shooting and focus on drugs coming into the country. Duran Guerrero's family and legal team spoke out against the representation of him. During the same event Vance calls Canada a state, and then quickly claims a Freudian slip.	
Tuesday August 25	Canada announced retaliatory tariffs against the United States, that would match "dollar for dollar" following the break down of trade talks between the United States and Canada.; Further hearings were held about the inclusion of President Trump's name on the Kennedy Center with government lawyers claiming that the building was "decrepit, dilapidated" and would soon collapse.; An assistant U.S. attorney in Minnesota told lawyers representing Julio Cesar Sosa-Celis that senior DOJ officials prevented him from bringing federal civil rights charges against the ICE agent who shot Sosa-Celis over his "strongest possible" objections.; The Department of State announced a global training initiatives at all US embassies and consulates worldwide and that the appointments for VISA services would be paused to accommodate the training.	
Wednesday August 26	US District Judge Indira Talwani vacated a nationwide preliminary injunction that she had issued earlier in August concluding that the Supreme Court ruling days prior in a related case required her to reconsider the injunction.; Two dozen states and the District of Columbia filed a new lawsuit to block President Trump's executive order restricting mail voting in the 2026 midterm elections.; Officials said that a Chinese espionage campaign has hacked several federal agencies including NASA, the Federal Reserve, the departments of Justice and Energy and the US Senate.	
Thursday August 27	In response to his escalating trade war with Canada, Trump signed an executive order to direct the US government to change the name of Lake Ontario to "Lake America." The name change was widely mocked by Democratic state governors, and Canadian officials, including Mark Carney.; President Trump announces plans to observe the 25th anniversary of 9/11 at the Pentagon instead of at the Ground Zero memorial in New York, as he has done in the past. It is reported he initially planned to attend the New York event, but changed his plans when he learned he would not be allowed to make a speech.; Sources in the defense department and NATO tell The Associated Press that the US military shortage of advanced missle interceptors in Europe due to the Iraq War is now "beyond critical". The shortage raises concerns about possible Russian attacks on NATO countries.	
Friday August 28	Fed Chairman Kevin Warsh spoke at the Federal Reserves annual symposium in Jackson Hole, Wyoming expressing concerns about elevated inflation and interest rates.; President Trump announces that he has secured deal on a large swath of Venezuela's oil reserves.	
Saturday August 29	The Commodity Futures Trading Commission fines Gabriel Perez, Trump's former teleprompter operator, $172,000 for exploiting non-public information in order to place wages on Trump's speeches on Kalshi.; President Trump announces that he will serve as honorary chairman of the 2026 Presidents Cup, which is scheduled to be held at Medinah Country Club in Medinah, Illinois.	
Sunday August 30	President Trump announces that the United States will use oil obtained through its recently announced agreement with Venezuela to replenish the Strategic Petroleum Reserve, saying that the "topping out" process would begin shortly.; President Trump says that Kristen Welker, host of Meet the Press, will be reported to the Federal Communications Commission for what he called a "purposeful inaccuracy" in her characterization of his record of political endorsements, calling for her to receive a "rebuke or punishment."; The Washington Post reports that the Pentagon has hired conservative influencers with large online followings without disclosing their assignments or salaries.; During a presentation at a global AIDS conference in Brazil, the State Department mistakenly presented a map of Africa with every nation misnamed. The State Department called the incident "an unfortunate error". An analysis of the map suggests it was made with OpenAI.	
Monday August 31	The United States Supreme Court allows construction on the White House Ballroom to continue in a 5-4 decision.; The US Treasury Department denies press credentials to reporters from The New York Times, The Wall Street Journal and Bloomberg News to cover next week's G20 conference. The Treasury department gave no explanation for the decision.; While speaking with evangelical podcast host Bryce Crawford, Vice President Vance states that if his work "leads to the end times, OK, and if that leads to … us building a better world that thrives and survives for a very long time after I'm gone, that's great, too".	

=== September 2026 ===
Date	Events	Photos/videos
Tuesday September 1	The U.S House of Representatives passes a resolution in a 370-48 vote to fund the government through December 11.; The U.S House of Representatives passes a measure in a 220-192 vote to denounce socialism. Democrats condemned the non-binding resolution as election-year stunt.; In a ruling against a Department of Health and Human Services decision to cut grants to teen pregnancy prevention programs, Judge Christopher Cooper scolds HHS for referencing public health studies that do not exist or do not support the propositions that HHS claims. The judge noted that these are "a hallmark of AI-generated citations."	
Wednesday September 2	President Trump proposes naming the Strait of Hormuz after himself.; A proposal to amend the constitution to permanently set the number of Supreme Court justices at nine fails to pass the House.	
Thursday September 3	Maria Bartiromo is fired from Fox News for sharing internal Fox Business communications with the White House. The confidential information was editorial guidance instructing her to not lend credibility to Trump's false claims of 2020 election fraud.; Sources say that Matthew Evans, the Assistant U.S. Attorney who was investigating ICE agent Christian Castro for civil rights violations in the shooting of Julio Cesar Sosa-Celis has been fired.; Robert F. Kennedy Jr. asked the CDC director to remove a reference to two Pennsylvania deaths from the agency's online measles tally because he questioned both the state's and the CDC's assessment of the cause of death.; The White House launches arcade.gov, a website featuring five video games that each promote different issues in the administration's agenda. Critics and gaming sites called some of the games "nativist" and "racist" and noted instances of copyright infringement.; When pressed by reporters about a US airstrike being potentially responsible for striking an Iranian wedding and killing four people including a child, Vice President Vance reportedly states "sometimes things happen". Vance also states "I wouldn't call it a war" when pressed by reporters regarding the Iran war.	
Friday September 4	The White House confirms that Melania Trump will not be attending the 2026 GOP Midterm Convention. She joins at least 45 GOP lawmakers who also are declining to attend.; The price of diesel fuel rises to an average of $5.85 a gallon, an all-time high.	
Saturday September 5		
Sunday September 6	President Trump posts an AI-generated video of himself changing a "Welcome to New Mexico" sign to "Welcome to New America" calling for the state's name to be changed, resulting in public outrage. Additional posts included an AI-generated video of President Trump and Canadian Prime Minister Mark Carney in hockey gear, while Trump threatened a cowering Carney, also causing widespread outrage.; President Trump posts an AI mockup of new Space Force uniforms noted as "inspired by the discipline and functionality of the Starship Trooper uniform." The film referenced is a satire of totalitarianism with uniforms inspired by Nazis.	
Monday September 7	The Wall Street Journal reports that, while he was effectively running the Department of Homeland Security, Corey Lewandowski asked both the governments of Qatar and the United Arab Emirates to "hire him on the side."	
Tuesday September 8	Canada increases tariffs on US products such as steel and aluminum to 50%, fulfilling a promise to match US tariffs on Canada "dollar for dollar."; British Columbia Premier David Eby debuts new signs at the U.S. border which read "Welcome to British Columbia, Canada. Strong, proud, and will NEVER be the 51st state. Sorry!"; During an event honoring the lives lost on 9/11/2001, Trump tells a story of visiting the US Steel building shortly after the attacks and being carried to safety by two firefighters because it was thought the building was falling down. There exists no evidence to back up this claim.; Financial records released by the administration show that Trump gave cash gifts of $45,000 to Natalie Harp and two other aides. The holiday gifts are almost a third of their $150,000 salaries, and could violate a federal law preventing the supplementation of federal employee salaries.; LIV Golf files for Chapter 11 bankruptcy, due to the withdrawal of support from Saudi Arabia's Public Investment Fund, following financial fallout from the 2026 Iran war.	
Wednesday September 9	The Wall Street Journal reports that senior advisors to the president, including Vice president Vance and Marco Rubio have told Trump privately that the war with Iran could last through the end of his term in 2029.; Despite Trump's Executive Order directing the US Government to rename Lake Ontario, the Associated Press issues guidance to refer to the lake by its original name.; European law enforcement agencies investigating crimes surrounding sex trafficker Jeffrey Epstein say that Trump's Justice Department has not responded to their requests for assistance.; Following a takedown notice from The Tetris Company, the White House removes its Tetris knockoff videogame "Build the Wall" from its website. The company writes in a statement it was not involved in the Trump administration's game and is considering further legal action. "At Tetris we believe in the power of connection and bringing people together, not dividing them." the statement noted.; While speaking at the Republican National Convention in Dallas, Texas, President Trump stated that he would offer every adult American a $5,000 payout if Republicans won both chambers of Congress in the midterm elections. The plan would cost $1.3 trillion and receives pushback from several congressional Republicans.; The Trump administration proposes updates to the 2030 federal census including adding a citizenship question and excludes immigrants who have not received legal permanent resident status.; As part of a video played at the Republican National Convention attacking the political left, a image of left-wing political commentator Hasan Piker posing in his underwear was shown on the jumbotron. The photo had been taken from Piker's social media and posted in 2024.	
Thursday September 10	A three judge appellate panel in the First Circuit Court of Appeals, rejects the Trump administration's request to lift a lower court's order blocking new rules for mail ballots to be lifted.; President Trump alleges that about 1 million Affordable Care Act enrollees across 30 states were overcharged in exchange fees by the Biden administration and pledges $500 rebate checks for those affected.; Longtime Trump ally and conspiracy theorist Joseph DiGenova abruptly resigns his position overseeing the DOJ's investigation of the supposed "Grand Conspiracy" declining to say why. People familiar with the matter tell the press diGenova was being pressured by superiors to more quickly deliver indictments in the inquiry.; Trump's closing speech of the Republican National Convention includes leading the audience in a "pledge" which contained instructions to vote "even if you're not registered" and to "cheat like hell". Trump concludes the pledge by saying "if you don't vote you go to hell".; Nielsen ratings on Fox News for Trump's night one speech at the Republican convention are approximately 40,000 viewers less than average episodes of Hannity and Gutfeld! in the same time slot.	
Friday September 11	President Trump and First Lady Melania Trump lay a wreath at the September 11 Memorial at the Pentagon, and later pay tribute to the nearly three thousand Americans killed that day.; The Justice Department announces its first-of-its-kind deportation through the Alien Terrorist Removal Court, of an Afghan woman who was accused of allegedly assisting her family in a foiled 2024 terror plot.	President Trump speaks at the Pentagon on the 25th anniversary of 9/11
Saturday September 12	During a meeting in Dublin with Irish Prime Minister Micheál Martin, Trump breaks with decades of neutrality on the highly divisive issue of Irish unification, drawing pushback from Northern Irish leaders.; A federal judge rules that the Trump administration's plan to reduce 50% of the workforce of the Federal Emergency Management Agency was an unlawful act. "Frankly, the FEMA staffing plan number appears as if pulled from thin air," wrote U.S. District Judge Susan Illston in her ruling.	President Trump participates in a bilateral meeting with Taoiseach Micheál Martin.
Sunday September 13	Kennedy Center officials tell the board of trustees that the center is on the verge of "fiscal collapse" and that the main building must close immediately. A packet distributed ahead of a board meeting makes clear that Trump's support for fundraising efforts are contingent on receiving public credit, specifically in the form of his name on the building.; People familiar with the matter say the Environmental Protection Agency plans to eliminate all regulation of carbon emissions from oil and gas burning power plants.; US District Court Judge Carl Nichols in Washington DC orders that the US Postal Service should not implement President Trumps executive order limiting mail balloting.; President Trump announces his support of the use of Flock cameras pointing to the support of the cameras by law enforcement as key part of his support.	
Monday September 14	Propublica reports that Donald Trump Jr.'s three day wedding party in the Bahamas was planned and largely funded by Umar Kremlev, a Russian oligarch close to Vladimir Putin. On Instagram, Trump Jr.'s wife Bettina confirms the story's details.; President Trump pushes back on calls for greater restrictions on artificial intelligence following calls by CEOs of Anthropic, OpenAI and SpaceX, claiming that the US should not "....kill the Golden Goose".; A report by the Department of Homeland Security's inspector general found that some immigrants detained at the "Alligator Alcatraz" were confined to outdoor cages only slightly larger than telephone booths for more than an hour at a time.; Senator Mitch McConnell returned to the Capitol following a prolonged three month hospitalization and absence. McConnell returned just as the Senate reconvened following a five-week summer recess.; During an appearance on the All-In Podcast Vice President Vance appears to make a gaff while speaking about the upcoming midterm elections stating; "Give us another chance, or give us another couple of years" claiming the administration was fixing problems left by the prior administrations.	
Tuesday September 15	Judge Christopher Cooper bars the Kennedy Center board's second attempt to put Trump's name on the building. In a meeting later that day, the board votes to immediately close the center for two years for repairs. Trump posts that these repairs will not take place if his name is not allowed on the building.; Without informing Republican leadership, GOP congressman Thomas Massie introduces articles of impeachment against Secretary of Defense Pete Hegseth, over his handling of the war with Iran and civilian deaths, including what he calls the "extrajudicial killings" of at least 221 people accused of smuggling drugs in the Caribbean.; CBS News publishes photos obtained from active service members on condition of anonymity showing widespread damage caused by Iranian missile and drone attacks, to barracks, other structures and equipment.	
Wednesday September 16	For the third time, the House of Representatives passes a resolution that would require the president to end his war with Iran.; Senator Bill Cassidy, the Republican chair of the US Senate health committee, blames the recent measles deaths in Pennsylvania on the Trump's administration's anti-vaccine policies. The Senator calles the outbreak "a terrible legacy for this administration".; According to emails and documents reviewed by the Washington Post, the National Park Service admits that Trump's proposed arch would adversely affect Arlington National Cemetery, the Lincoln Memorial and many other historic sites.; Speaking to press, President Trump says that unless his administration gets "recognition", the Kennedy Center will close and get "ripped down." He was later photographed aboard Air Force One staring at a large printout appearing to reference the Kennedy Center being demolished.; The Federal Reserve hikes its main interest rate for the first time since 2023 and hinted on more increases may be coming, causing US stocks to slip.; While speaking to supporters in North Carolina President Trump claims that the rising cost of gas and diesel to be "...a very inexpensive price to pay...". The national average for regular gas has jumped to $4.43 while diesel is at a current high average of $6.39.	
Thursday September 17	A published report by human rights experts commissioned by the United Nations says that the commission had found "reasonable grounds" to believe that the United States had committed war crimes during the Iran war.; Addressing an anti-vaccine activist group he once chaired, Secretary of Health Robert Kennedy Jr. tells the members they have "a strong and steadfast friend at the White House." He also said his agency would be investigating the long-debunked conspiracy theory known as chemtrails.	
Friday September 18	President Trump announces that he is banning MS NOW, CNN and Politico from the White House over their coverage of himself and his administration through a post on Truth Social.; Presient Trump announces that the United States has entered a security deal with Denmark and Greenland.; Thousands of protesters link hands and form a human chain around the Kennedy Center, responding to threats that Trump might tear the building down. The protestors demand Trump be removed as chairman.; Vice President Vance spoke at a Republican National Committee rally in Council Bluffs, Iowa to promote Republican candidates and the Trump administration.	
Saturday September 19		
Sunday September 20	Trump posts on social media that he has agreed to turn the proposed Triumphal Arch into what he calls "a top grade Military Complex/Triumphal Arch" which would deploy military drones and snipers, as well as provide storage for ammunition.; In an interview with the Sunday Times, Sylvester Stallone admits that he was blindsided by a 2025 Trump announcement appointing him as a "special ambassador" to Hollywood. Stallone says he was not asked, and would have turned down the position if he had been.	
Monday September 21	CNN, MS NOW and Politico file a lawsuit against the Trump administration after their reporters were prevented from entering the White House over the weekend. The lawsuit calls the ban "a blatant violation" of the First Amendment.; The five members of the White House TV pool, consisting of ABC, NBC, CBS, Fox News, and CNN, respond to the ban announcing that the pool will not cover Presidential events, meaning there will not be video coverage of the President unless news outlets shoot their own or use a White House feed.; The UN Human Rights Council releases a report concluding that the US attacks on alleged drug boats that have killed 223 people violated international law and "constituted crimes against humanity of murder."; "Trump TV" is launched on the White House's YouTube page, with its first broadcast being a stream of Trump's July 3 address at Mount Rushmore on the White House YouTube channel in a livestream.	
Tuesday September 22	President Trump addresses the United Nations General Assembly at the Headquarters of the United Nations. He makes multiple false claims and suggests he could "annihilate the Islamic Republic" and "drive them into hell with no chance of survival."; President Trump holds a bilateral meeting with British Prime Minister Andy Burnham in New York City.; President Trump holds a bilateral meeting with Japanese Prime Minister Sanae Takaichi in New York City.; President Trump holds a bilateral meeting with Ukrainian President Volodymyr Zelenskyy in New York City.; ProPublica reports that, when the Trump administration shut down the FBI's anti-corruption unit in 2025, agents were prevented from investigating allegations of illegal pay-to-play campaign contributions from defense contractor Martin Kao to Senator Susan Collins.; Republican Senator John Curtis publicly calls for the Senate Judiciary Committee to investigate both Hunter Biden and Donald Trump Jr. for using their family's access to power for private financial benefit, specifically mentioning the recent news of Trump Jr.'s two-day wedding party funded by a Russian oligarch, as well as his cryptocurrency ventures, foreign real estate deals, and defense contracts.; Vice President Vance and members of the Trump administration including CMS administrator Dr. Oz announces the planned removal of 760,000 Affordable Care Act enrollees due to alleged fraud or inexistence.; Defense Secretary Hegseth announces the roll out of the Joint Warfighter Evaluation, a new battlefield-style assessment for eligible colonels and Navy captains aimed for one-star general or admiral promotions.	President Trump addresses the 81st session of the United Nations General Assembly President Trump and Ukrainian President Volodymyr Zelenskyy
Wednesday September 23	MS NOW reports that administration officials have discussed other government sites that could be renamed to honor President Trump, including Ford's Theatre National Historic Site. President Trump later dismisses the report calling it "a ridiculous lie".; Chinese leader Xi Jinping, accompanied by Peng Liyuan, begins a three-day state visit, the second during the second Trump presidency. In an elaborate and extremely rare red carpet ceremony, Trump personally greets the Chinese leader on the tarmac, the first time ever for a visit from a Chinese state visit.; Treasury rates spike to 19-year high with the note yield increasing to 5.104%.; An ad campaign glorifying President Trump scored to the JMSN song "Love Me" and ending with the tagline "Paid for by the U.S. Government" begins airing on cable, even though the US bans the use of federal funds for "publicity or propaganda purposes." JMSN says he was not consulted and the use of his song in the ad is authorized.	
Thursday September 24	President Trump holds a bilateral meeting with Chinese leader Xi Jinping at the White House.; President and First Lady Trump host their second state dinner for his second presidency in honor of Xi Jinping and Peng Liyuan.; CNN, MS NOW and Politico filed an emergency request for a hearing after reporters were denied access to the White House despite a court order. Federal Judge Timothy Kelly had granted a temporary restraining order requiring the reinstatement of the press credentials of the affected journalists earlier that day.; FDA nominee Heidi Overton expresses her confidence in every vaccine on the US market during her confirmation hearing, contradicting previous statements made by President Trump.; Senators Elizabeth Warren and Richard Blumenthal requests that Attorney General Todd Blanche answer questions about the Department of Justice handling and dismissal of the fraud and bribery case against Indian billionaire Gautam Adani.; Democratic leadership and campaign organizations sue the Trump administration over alleged threats to deploy armed federal agents to polling sites for the upcoming midterm elections.; The US 9th Circuit Court of Appeals upheld the majority of a district ruling that allowed for the release of $239 million in funds from the Department of Housing and Urban Development for Los Angeles, California.; Amnesty International issues a report calling for the United States to abolish the Immigration and Customs Enforcement agency, alleging a large list of violations of international human rights laws.	President Trump and Chinese leader Xi Jinping
Friday September 25	The Supreme Court allows the Trump administration to use an expanded federal database containing citizenship information in regards to reviewing voter rolls.; Trump rejects an Iranian proposal for a ceasefire which would have reopened the Strait of Hormuz and resumed nuclear talks. Trump has told aides that he expects to resume bombing Iran after the 2026 midterm elections.	
Saturday September 26	Trump attends a Tennessee Volunteers football game in Knoxville, Tennessee and is loudly booed when his image appears on the Jumbotron. He leaves the game at halftime.	
Sunday September 27	A second pro-Trump television advertisement ending with the phrase "Paid for by the U.S. Government" airs across the country. Though the White House insists the ads are public service announcements and not campaign ads, this ad is identical to one produced and aired by Trump's 2024 presidential campaign.; In an interview with Fox News, United States Ambassador to China David Perdue says that Trump has asked Chinese leader Xi Jinping if he would like to buy American weapons. The State Department clarified that the US has no plans to sell weapons to China and that doing so would violate US law.	
Monday September 28	The Trump administration rolls back vehicle fuel economy standards alleging that the Biden administration "went far beyond" Congressional requirements.; President Trump and Secretary of State Marco Rubio both raise concerns and criticisms over the British counterterror police's handling of a suspected possible plot near the RAF Fairford air base used by United States troops.; Following the Department of Homeland Security posting an AI generated video using Hall of Fame safety and former Philadelphia Eagles player Brian Dawkins to promote the administrations immigration agenda, the DHS refuses to take down the video following calls from the NFL and Dawkins.; Department of Education Secretary Linda McMahon announces updated regulations that seek to restore Title IX language and standards from President Trump's first administration and rolling back former President Biden's updates.; FBI co-deputy director Andrew Bailey, who was widely considered as a potential successor to FBI Director Kash Patel, announces his resignation. Sources say Patel had been keeping Bailey out of meetings because Bailey was frequently flagging proposals as unconstitutional.	
Tuesday September 29	Former special counsel Jack Smith appears before the Senate Judiciary Committee in regards to his investigation into President Trumps alleged efforts to overturn his 2020 election loss, the January 6th attack on the US Capitol and President Trumps handling of classified documents after he left office at the end of his first presidency on January 20, 2021.; The Trump administration launches America.gov, an AI powered website led by US Chief Design Officer Joe Gebbia which intends to allow users to ask questions about the government and country. The site's answers contradict many of President Trump's false claims on subjects such as election fraud, immigration, tariffs, inflation and the president’s signature bill.; The American Federation of Government Employees union files a lawsuit against the EPA and administrator Lee Zeldin alleging the agency illegally terminated the unions collective bargaining agreement.; President Trump signs an executive order demanding that all executive branch departments and agencies use the term "super intelligence." The terms "artificial intelligence" and "AI" will no longer be acknowledged.	
Wednesday September 30	The New York Times reports of an audio recording in which 2026 Senate candidate Ken Paxton tells donors the Republican convention had damaged them politically.; President Trump announces the investment by South Korea into an natural gas pipeline in Alaska with exports of the product to Asia.	

== See also ==
- First 100 days of the second Trump presidency – Period from January to April 2025
- List of executive actions by Donald Trump
- Lists of presidential trips made by Donald Trump (international trips)
- Second presidential transition of Donald Trump – Transfer of presidential power from Joe Biden to Donald Trump
- Timeline of the 2024 United States presidential election

U.S. presidential administration timelines
Preceded by Second Trump presidency (2026 Q2)	Second Trump presidency (2026 Q3)	Succeeded by Second Trump presidency (2026 Q4)
