= Timeline of the second Trump presidency (2026 Q4) =

The following is a timeline of the second presidency of Donald Trump during the fourth quarter of 2026, from October 1, 2026, to December 31, 2026. To navigate between quarters, see Timeline of the Donald Trump presidencies.

== Timeline ==
=== October 2026 ===
Date	Events	Photos/videos
Thursday October 1	The family of slain Minnesota protester Renee Good files wrongful death lawsuits against ICE agent Jonathan Ross as well as Trump administration officials Kristi Noem, Stephen Miller, Tom Homan, Todd Lyons, and Gregory Bovino.; While rallying for GOP governor candidate Byron Donalds in Lakeland, Florida, Vice President JD Vance criticized Representative Angie Nixon for calling herself a Democratic Socialist, claiming she does not belong in the US.; Defense Secretary Pete Hegseth announces a one-day military-wide stand-down in October to allow for troops to vote, either in-person or by mail-in ballots.; DC Superior Court Judge Todd Edelman ordered the dismissal of David Hearn's case with prejudice. Hearn had been charged with alleged vandalizing of the Lincoln Memorial Reflecting pool.; President Trump delivers remarks at Peterbilt Motors Company.	President Trump delivers remarks.
Friday October 2	Following a G7 video conference to discuss fuel supply and prices, President Trump announces that Europe would release diesel oil from its stockpiles. A joint statement from G7 leaders is released by the Élysée Palace confirming the release over a four month period.; President Trump states that if South Korea does not sign onto a planned Alaska pipeline project he would just "charge them more" following a prior announcement by Trump that South Korea had already signed.; President Trump announces a one-time direct deposit of $90 payment to over 20 million seniors enrolled in Medicare Part B to help cover premium costs. The payments are supposed to be sourced from the Medicare Improvement Fund founded in 2008.	
Saturday October 3	President Trump posts Senator Tom Cotton's cellphone number to social media while lashing out at Cotton's attempts to make daylight savings time permanent.; President Trump embarks on a 32-day blitz of speaking arrangements ahead of the mid term elections, promoting candidates and the Republican party in both battleground and deep-red states.; At the end of a long day, during a rally in Oklahoma, Trump claims for the first time that Iranian nuclear facilities the US recently bombed were also "drug factories." The White House refuses to clarify or comment on the claim.	
Sunday October 4	President Trump announces the formation of an artificial intelligence task force headed by National Intelligence Director Jay Clayton. The task force is to be named the Super Intelligence Force.	
Monday October 5	Secretary of State Marco Rubio announces the monitoring of the quarantining of dozens and the death of a researcher at the Irkutsk Research Anti-Plague Institute of Siberia in Shelekhov.; Fox News announces that former Press Secretary Karoline Leavitt will join as an on-air contributor, following Sarah Huckabee Sanders and Kayleigh McEnany who also joined Fox following their departures from the administration.; In a social media post, Trump claims that, due to widespread backlash, his pro-Trump ad campaign will be paid in the future with funds from his super PAC instead of taxpayer dollars.; Politico, who was scheduled to be the primary print pool reporter for Trump's trip to Nebraska, is banned from flying Air Force One. The White House attempted to find a replacement, but all outlets asked declined, meaning the trip will take place without a primary print pool reporter for the first time in recent memory.; During a rally, Trump says that Iran "can take out a city. Let 'em take out Los Angeles, let 'em take out San Diego. This is a very small price to pay." His remarks spread quickly online, and are roundly condemned by California officials.	
Tuesday October 6	An 8.5 ft tall 23-karat gold leaf statue of President Trump depicted naked is unveiled at a thoroughfare inside the European Parliament in Strasbourg, France. The statue is titled "The Orange Plague" and created by Danish artist Jens Galschiøt.; President Trump praises the acquisition of Warner Bros. Discovery by Paramount Skydance after the deal closed earlier that day.	
Wednesday October 7	While speaking at a rally in San Antonio, President Trump's remarks were interrupted by protestors, with some led away by police. Following their removal without evidence, Trump claims the protestors were "paid by enemies of our nation”.; The Department of Homeland Security proposes a $70,000 fee for international students seeking to participate in the optional practice training program. The program allows for students to work in jobs related to their major during or after time in school for about one year.; The Government Accountability Office reports that the Department of Health and Human Services violated the Impoundment Control Act by withholding more than $78 million in the 2025 fiscal year following mass layoffs.; The Democratic National Committee sues the Trump administration over the use of taxpayer-funded advertisements featuring President Trump, alleging that the ads violate federal laws on government spending and propaganda under the Anti-Deficiency Act and the Purpose Statute.	
Thursday October 8	Vice President Vance announces the suspension of Microsoft and other firms ability to allow foreign workers to apply for green cards and H-1B visas raised allegations of fraud through the programs.; Pete Hegseth announces that the military execution of Nidal Hasan will be conducted by firing squad and live-streamed.; President Trump announces in a Truth Social post that the White House will consider anyone who uses the term "artificial intelligence" as opposed to "super intelligence" to be "the enemy".	
Friday October 9	President Trump announces a deal with Russia to provide diesel for the U.S. and global market.	
Saturday October 10	Following the notice of tree-cutting being posted late the day before, the National Park Service cut down 529 trees in East Potomac Park as part of President Trumps planned renovation of the East Potomac Golf Course.	
Sunday October 11	President Trump announces an energy ceasefire deal has been reached between Russia and Ukraine.	
Monday October 12	The Justice Department announces the predawn raid by the Department of Homeland Security Investigations on the Washington DC home of Democratic Representative Ilhan Omar as part of an undisclosed investigation. Omar alleged later on social media it was an alleged escalation of political intimidation by President Trump.; US District Judge Ana Reyes scolds President Trumps legal team, citing failure to provide sufficient notice during an emergency hearing following the cutting down of hundreds of trees in East Potomac Park.	
Tuesday October 13	A bipartisan group of Senators, including six Republicans, send a letter urging Trump to rescind his fuel deal with Russia calling it "a gift to our adversary and a betrayal of our Allies."; Kimberly Guilfoyle resigns her position as Ambassador to Greece at the request of the White House following reports of alleged misconduct including asking a donor to pay off a $100,000 credit card debt.; Former Newsmax reporter Katie Zacharia makes her debut, and only, briefing as the White House Press Secretary, taking only three questions in fourteen minutes. Zacharia majorly read from a script and mixed up the words "husband" and "president".; The Supreme Court agrees to hear arguments in Citizens for Responsibility and Ethics in Washington lawsuit seeking public records about Elon Musk and DOGE.; The Department of Energy issues an emergency order directing thirteen states to use backup generation capabilities if necessary to maintain the power grid incase of widespread blackouts for a week period.	Katie Zacharia holding her debut and only press briefing in the James S. Brady Press Briefing Room, October 13, 2026
Wednesday October 14	The Social Security cost of living adjustment was announced for 3.6% in 2027, resulting in an additional $75 per month on average.; US District Judge Jinsook Ohta orders the State Department to reopen the Diversity VISA Lottery for 2027 following the departments apparent refusal to open the program at all.; Defense Secretary Hegseth and other military leaders spoke during the US Army's annual conference. Protestors disrupt some of the speeches.	
Thursday October 15	President Trump announces that the planned livestream execution of Nidal Hasan would not occur on Truth Social, while also stating it would be a "strong deterrent for the World" if the livestream had occurred.; The Justice Department sues Californian election officials in an attempt to bar the state from counting mail-in-ballots for the upcoming midterm elections. The department alleges the state had failed to meet a 48-hr deadline to review a list of names the administration alleges to be likely noncitizens who sent ballots for the midterms.	
Friday October 16	President Trump says he would let Katie Zacharia decide if she wants to remain as Press Secretary. Later that day, Zacharia departs from the role.	
Saturday October 17	Defense Secretary Hegseth speaks to ROTC cadets and military recruits at the University of Tennessee, suggesting that only "one or two" allies of NATO led International Security Assistance Force were actively involved in combat in Afghanistan. His remarks drew criticism from US military veterans and European leaders.	
Sunday October 18	President Trump announces that renovation work would begin on November 15, at the historic East Potomac Golf course on Truth Social, despite the ongoing lawsuit. Following the message, District Judge Ana Reyes orders the Trump administration to notify her by 8pm that night whether its position had changed from its court filings two days prior.	
Monday October 19	President Trump signs an executive order championed by First Lady Trump to bolster federal research into women's healthcare.; Defense Secretary Hegseth announces on social media that he is visiting troops the Middle East that were on an unspecified "historic mission". Reports from Axios later report that Hegseth met with Israeli Prime Minister Netanyahu in Israel.; President Trump endorses Israeli Prime Minister Netanyahu ahead of Israeli upcoming elections. Vice President Vance declines to do the same stating his intent to focus on upcoming US midterm elections.; President Trump announces that Department of Agriculture is offering an $8 billion aid package for farmers to help cover high costs of diesel and fertilizer during a rally in Kansas. This would be the second package in 11 months.; University of North Carolina at Chapel Hill announces its agreement with the Trump administration closing multiple federal investigations and ensuring federal funding. The university had 19 federal inquires over alleged compliance issues with Title VI of the Civil Rights Act.	
Tuesday October 20	President Trump and Vice President Vance announce a $25 million program to encourage the public to whistle blow on suspected fraud, under the new Fraud Whistleblower Incentive Program (WHIP).; Defense Secretary Hegseth bans the Defense Department personnel from using nonpublic information to bet on US military operations. The memo details that it would apply to classified and unclassified information and specifically includes prediction markets such as Polymarket and Kalshi.; Politico Pro reports that the Defense Health Agency had awarded a $41 million non-competitive contract with Singapore-based iX Biopharma company in February 2026, to produce a ketamine wafer to treat pain.	
Wednesday October 21	Russian President Vladimir Putin agrees to resume three-way negotiations between the United States, Ukraine and Russia after November 10 in an effort to end the ongoing Ukraine-Russian war, following a meeting with special envoy Steve Witkoff in St.Petersburg.; The Supreme Court rejects an emergency order from the Justice Department, requesting the freezing of a lower courts order regarding the termination of certain medical interventions for transgender inmates.; Democratic party organizations, Chuck Schumer and Hakeem Jeffries sue the Trump administration alleging Trump's attempts to purge state voter rolls amount to unlawful election interference.	
Thursday October 22	A new book by journalist Matthew Cole alleges that Jared Kushner had access to secret accounts of over $2 billion in "slush money funds" from Middle Eastern leaders, intended for "off-the-books diplomatic objectives."; The Justice Department files a lawsuit to block certification of the Alaskan Senate race if Republican Senator Dan Sullivan loses the vote, while another candidate with the same name is on the ballot.; In a post to Truth Social, President Trump alleges that Representative Ilhan Omar was ineligible to continue serving allegedly due to fraud and using a fake name. Trump alleges that Omar's name is Ilhan Nur Said Elmi, which is the last name of her ex-husband.; President Trump spoke out in support of a Vivek Ramaswamy attack ad against opponent Amy Acton which features her estranged mother. In 1978, Actons mother lost custody of Acton and her siblings after a man she was married to was indicted for allegedly sexually abusing Acton. Trump also criticized Republican Governor Mike DeWine after DeWine was critical of the ad, with Trump stating DeWine was “disloyal to the Republican Party.”; Published photographs show damage to a 30-inch Eisenhower globe used by President Eisenhower to plan the D-day landings while allied supreme commander. The globe was reportedly broken by staff of Defense Secretary Hegseth during an attempted move of the globe into his office.	
Friday October 23	According to a White House statement, First Lady Melania Trump secured a ceasefire between Russia and Ukraine in the Russian-controlled city of Oleshky, with the ceasefire set to begin on October 27. The White House statement is criticized for neglecting to mention Pope Leo XIV’s efforts in securing the same ceasefire.; It was reported by the Washington Post that Defense Secretary Hegseth office attempted to cancel all military presence for the New Orleans Saints and the Pittsburgh Steelers game, at Stade de France, due to the ongoing French protests.	
Saturday October 24	Appearing in Ohio in his first campaign rally in the 2026 United States elections, former president Barack Obama says the Trump administration is defined by "incompetence the likes of which we have not seen in modern times."; During a campaign rally in Perry, Georgia Trump downplays high gas prices, instead boasting about how much money some are making from oil. "I don't give a damn, I'm going to say it. We're making a freaking fortune," Trump says.	
Sunday October 25	While speaking during a campaign rally in Port Huron, Michigan, President Trump uses anti-Muslim rhetoric against Michigan Senate candidate Abdul El-Sayad. His comments, including that El-Sayad was a "jihadist" and was "on the side of the terrorists" were condemned by both El-Sayad and Bishara Bahbah, a founder of Arab Americans for Trump.	
Monday October 26	House Judiciary Committee Democrats releases a 50-page unsigned staff report which allegedly lays out "the case against Donald Trump" in relation to the Epstein files, while calling for an independent special counsel to investigate President Trump, Attorney General Todd Blanche and the Justice Department. The report highlights Trump and Epstein's relationship, allegations Trump was an active participant in the sexual abuse, and other longstanding unsubstantiated allegations against Trump.; The House staff report on Trump's alleged ties to Epstein's sex trafficking operation reveals a new accusation from former Miss Switzerland Beatrice Keul, in which she alleges that President Trump raped her at the Plaza Hotel in New York City in November 1993.; Vice President Vance speaks in Topeka, Kansas in support of Republican Senator Roger Marshall in the Kansas Senate race. Vance's speech is disrupted several times by protesters.; During a rally in Corinth, Mississippi, Trump is interrupted three times by protesters. One protester notably shouts "Shove that ballroom up your fat ass!”; The Pentagon's FORTRESS America initiative is announced and directs major US military bases to prepare and stock themselves in order to keep working for at least 90 days without outside help. The bases are directed to prepare for producing and storing their own power, water, fuel and ways to communicate.	
Tuesday October 27	The State Department announces that Flávio Bolsonaro and his family will be granted US Visa's following his loss in the 2026 Brazilian presidential elections amid allegations of corruption.	
Wednesday October 28	Defense Secretary Hegseth fires the Pentagons top military planner, Army Lt. Gen. Brett Sylvia over allegations of misconduct and leaking classified information related to the Iran war and the Russia-Ukraine war.; A hacking group broke into the Department of Homeland Security personnel files, causing more than 40,000 DHS agents, operatives and associates personal information to be exposed. The breach is attributed to the hacking group Distributed Denial of Secrets after the group posted it online.; US District Judge David Carter denies the Justice Departments emergency order to have California segregate about 20,000 ballots allegedly identified as being "likely" non-citizens. Carter highlights the potential widespread "havoc" on the upcoming midterm elections as more than 3 million people have already voted in the state.	
Thursday October 29	President Trump and First Lady Melania Trump participate in the White House Halloween event.; During a political rally in Rock Hill, South Carolina where President Trump spoke in support of Darline Graham, Fox News spoke to an attendee who likened the rally to a cult stating that while he was too young to be at the South American Jonestown Massacre “ there's nothing like seeing a cult right up front, man.”	President Trump and First Lady Melania Trump greet trick-or-treaters during the White House Halloween event
Friday October 30		
Saturday October 31	Following the defeat of Brazilian president candidate Flávio Bolsonaro and subsequent arrival in the United States, Secretary of State Marco Rubio states the Trump administration did not facilitate Bolsonaro's arrival.	

=== November 2026 ===
Date	Events	Photos/videos
Sunday November 1	At a campaign rally in Iowa President Trump, used anti-muslim rhetoric against Michigan candidate Abdul El-Sayed, repeatedly calling him a "jihadist", while praising Hayley Stevens for refusing to campaign with El-Sayed following her loss in the Michigan primaries.	
Monday November 2	For his closing message on the eve of the 2026 United States elections, Trump gives an hourlong speech at the Lincoln Memorial Reflecting Pool in front of dozens of staffers, highlighting in great detail his renovations of the pool, the East Potomac Park Golf Course, the White House ballroom, and the White House helipad.; While speaking during a republican political rally in Swanton, Ohio as part of Vice President Vance's last-minute rally spring, Donald Trump Jr tells attendees “They [Democrats] want to pack the Supreme Court; they want to make Ohio a state, make D.C. a state" in an apparent gaffe.; The United States carries out strikes against Iran's Qeshm Island following Vice President Vance's interview with CNN where he expresses his hope of a "negotiated settlement" with Iran.; US District Judge Myong Joun rejects the Justice Departments lawsuit against Harvard University to turn over records for an investigation into whether the University considers race into its student admissions process.; The official White House account posts an AI generated image of President Trump, Vice President Vance, Treasury Secretary Scott Bessent, Defense Secretary Pete Hegseth and Secretary of State Marco Rubio aboard the animated pirate ship Going Merry from the manga One Piece. The post quickly drew controversy from the manga's creator, Japanese officials, fans of the show and GenZ protestors who have embraced the shows images in their protests.	
Tuesday November 3	The midterm elections are held with the Democrats gaining control of the House of Representatives and the Senate. Gains in the House of Representatives and the Senate give Democrats the majority.; President Trump announced that the US would terminate all military aid to Israel, totaling $4 billion per year, by the end of 2026, but will continue to sell military hardware.; Shortly before midnight, President Trump raged against Fox News on Truth Social. Trump claimed that both the network "...bears responsibility for these losses..." regarding the midterm elections and that, had he been on the ballot, the Republicans would have won in a landslide. Trump then called into the network and appeared to accept the election results. He praised the Democratic party and placed blame for the electoral losses on Republican candidates.; Vice President Vance appears to attribute a list of achievements from New York City to President Trump and the Trump administration, ahead of the midterm elections on social media. NYC mayor Zohran Mamdani quickly responded to the post, apparently mocking the attempt to take credit for successes that the administration had nothing to do with.	
Wednesday November 4	Following the midterm elections and Democratic victories, the stock market surged with gains in multiple areas.; In his first appearance following the wave election of 2026 and the loss of both houses of Congress, President Trump gives reporters a tour of the construction site of the White House ballroom.; In a lengthy post on social media Vice President Vance appears to attempt to distance himself from President Trump's policies and lay out ground work for a potential 2028 election platform, highlighting the need to end the Iran war, the affordability crisis and reconsidering the United States relationship with Israel.	
Thursday November 5	First Lady Melania Trump announces that Russian and Ukrainian representatives are reunited at the White House following the Russo-Ukrainian war ceasefire in Oleshky.; In his first official action since the 2026 midterms, President Trump signs a proclamation attempting to preserve the Oval Office and Cabinet Room as a national monument.	First Lady Melania Trump delivers a speech in front of the Blue Room
Friday November 6	The White House announces that Susie Wiles has been fired from her position as White House Chief of Staff and will be replaced with long time Trump ally Stephen Miller. Miller has been described as far-right, anti-immigrant, and white nationalist.; President Trump spoke on 60 Minutes with correspondent Ross Douthat and spoke about the elections and his policies, such as his crack down on immigration.	
Saturday November 7	On social media, President Trump offers the position of White House Press Secretary to Ultimate Fighting Championship CEO Dana White. It is not clear if the offer is genuine.; While speaking on Fox News Republican Senator Ron Johnson echoed allegations made by former White House advisor Calley Means the day before, with both alleging the Trump administration of corruption with top aides and political strategists allegedly catering to special interests.	
Sunday November 8		
Monday November 9	Republican Representative Thomas Massie introduces an impeachment resolution against Defense Secretary Hegseth based on the handling of the Iran War and Hegseth's role in military actions in Yemen and Venezuela.; President Trump raises doubt over the legitimacy of the 2026 midterm elections on Truth Social with allegations against early voting numbers and overall reported numbers and polls. This is a pivot from his prior tone where he had conceded the win to Democrats and was "absolutely willing" to accept the results of the midterms days after the election.; Multiple US military aircraft were removed from the RAF Mildenhall base due to increased security measures connected with threats from Iran, with some planes taken to other bases in the United Kingdom and others to bases in Germany and Spain.	
Tuesday November 10	Defense Secretary Hegseth dismisses the articles of impeachment introduced against him by Representative Thomas Massie claiming that the articles are a "political spectacle" and driven by "ego and resentment."; The House voted 211 to 204 to refer the articles of impeachment against Defense Secretary Hegseth to committee, effectively killing the articles. Representative Massie stated he stood by the articles and would be willing to reintroduce them later on.; House Democrats raise demands that the Interior Department retain all paperwork and documentation related to President Trump's construction project around Washington D.C. following whistleblowers alleged that key paper work has been and continuously being destroyed before the Democratic majority takes over Congress in January 2027.; House Republicans elect Representative Jim Jordan for their leader, while Senate Republicans elected Senator John Thune as head of their leadership, with Senators John Barrasso and Tom Cotton rounding out the leadership team.; The Justice Department announces charges against the three Iranian and Iraqi nationals with plotting an attack at the RAF Fairford air base in the United Kingdom, following a thwarted attack in September 2026.; Donald Trump Jr raises allegations on his podcast states his support for Russell Brand following his arrest and sentencing for rape and sexual assault. Trump Jr alleges without support that Brand's conviction was due to Brands shift to conservatism and that Muslim immigrants in the United Kingdom had committed more serious offenses but received lighter sentences.	
Wednesday November 11	President Trump performs a wreath-laying ceremony at the Tomb of the Unknown Soldier at the Arlington National Cemetery and delivers the Veterans Day address at the Memorial Amphitheater.; A letter from White House counsel Will Scharf to incoming House Oversight Committee Chair Robert Garcia is publicly revealed and warns that the White House is “monitoring the abusive and capricious threats" from Democratic lawmakers, and allegations that the preposed oversight efforts are illegitimate investigations and could cross constitutional limits.	President Trump lays the wreath at the Tomb of the Unknown Soldier
Thursday November 12		
Friday November 13	The Federal Aviation Administration announces a nationwide ground stop cancelling all air traffic across the country. The move is blamed on a communications issue and is the third nationwide ground stop in US history.	
Saturday November 14	Judge Anna Reyes blocks the Trump administration's planned closing of the East Potomac golf course for a massive renovation.	
Sunday November 15	After a day and a half of silence, President Trump finally comments on Friday's nationwide ground stop, blaming the event on the Biden administration.	
Monday November 16	Following the nationwide ground stop, Vice President Vance acknowledges that a lot of systems need to be fixed and blames Congress for not reinvesting, while speaking with Fox News host Laura Ingraham. Vance also preemptively blames the newly elected Congress by stating that the elected Democrats are obsessed with transgendered athletes and not affordability or infrastructure.	
Tuesday November 17	The Pan American Health Organization announces that, due to a sharp resurgence of the disease, the United States has lost its measles elimination status.; The National Security Agency's highly classified internal communications network known as NSANet unexpectedly goes offline.; President Trump nominates General Chris LaNeve to be the US Army's top officer, LaNeve had been serving in the position in interim capacity following Defense Secretary Hegseth firing his predecessor in April 2026.; Defense Secretary Hegseth spiritual adviser pastor Doug Wilson preaches a sermon at the Pentagon. Wilson has been labeled as a radical Christina nationalist.; President Trump arrives in Manila, Philippines.; President Trump attends the 2026 ASEAN summit hosted by Filipino president Bongbong Marcos.; President Trump attends the QUAD leaders summit with Australian prime minister Anthony Albanese, Indian prime minister Narendra Modi, and Japanese prime minister Sanae Takaichi.; President Trump participates in a U.S.–Thai trade deal signing ceremony with Thai prime minister Anutin Charnvirakul.	President Trump arrives in the Philippines ASEAN leaders at the 2026 ASEAN summit President Trump with prime ministers Takaichi, Modi and Albanese President Trump participates in the trade deal signing ceremony with Thaland
Wednesday November 18	President Trump attends a state dinner hosted by Filipino president Bongbong Marcos.; President Trump arrives in Shenzhen, China and meets with Chinese leader Xi Jinping.; President Trump attends the 2026 APEC summit hosted by Chinese leader Xi Jinping.; A Colorado federal judge holds Immigration and Customs Enforcement officials in contempt of court for practices that violated judicial orders.; Vice President Vance abruptly cancels a scheduled appearance at The New York Times DealBook Summit and attends meetings on a recent wave of high-profile technology outages.; Defense Secretary Hegseth announces the reestablishment of military ties between the United States and Venezuela while visiting Caracas and the Venezuelan interim leadership.; Defense Secretary Hegseth participates in the transfer of a Lockheed C-130 Hercules in Bogotá to Colombia's Fuerza Pública in an effort to deepen the military ties between the United States and Columbia.; The Department of Education opened investigations into five school districts over how the districts handle students requests to use preferred names and pronouns at school and what is reported to parents.	President Trump participates in a welcome ceremony with Filipino president Bongbong Marcos President Trump participates in a bilateral meeting with Filipino president Bongbong Marcos President Trump participates in a bilateral lunch with Filipino president Bongbong Marcos President Trump arrives in China
Thursday November 19	President Trump holds a trilateral with Chinese leader Xi Jinping and Russian president Vladimir Putin.; President Trump announces the pardon of the deceased baseball player Pete Rose via Truth Social. Rose had been convicted of tax evasion in 1990.; A technical bulletin was issued by the Department of Agriculture detailing on going maintenance after multiple department applications were taken offline over a multi-day period in response to a cybersecurity incident.	APEC leaders at the 2026 APEC summit President Trump with Chinese leader Xi Jinping and Russian president Vladimir Putin
Friday November 20	President Trump holds news conference in Washington, DC after returning from trip to Asia where he met with Xi Jinping and Vladimir Putin; President Trump announces that US companies will either be barred from building data centers in other countries or face a "tremendous tax" penalty if they do so.; President Trump expresses his continued support and confidence in Commerce Secretary Howard Lutnick, following growing bipartisan pressure.; Federal Judge Leonie Brinkema issues a preliminary injunction to block construction of President Trump's triumphal arch, calling it a rush job and lacking proper analysis for the project.	
Saturday November 21		
Sunday November 22		
Monday November 23		
Tuesday November 24		
Wednesday November 25		
Thursday November 26		
Friday November 27		
Saturday November 28		
Sunday November 29		
Monday November 30		

=== December 2026 ===
Date	Events	Photos/videos
Tuesday December 1		
Wednesday December 2		
Thursday December 3		
Friday December 4		
Saturday December 5		
Sunday December 6		
Monday December 7		
Tuesday December 8		
Wednesday December 9		
Thursday December 10		
Friday December 11		
Saturday December 12		
Sunday December 13		
Monday December 14		
Tuesday December 15		
Wednesday December 16		
Thursday December 17		
Friday December 18		
Saturday December 19		
Sunday December 20		
Monday December 21		
Tuesday December 22		
Wednesday December 23		
Thursday December 24		
Friday December 25		
Saturday December 26		
Sunday December 27		
Monday December 28		
Tuesday December 29		
Wednesday December 30		
Thursday December 31		

== See also ==
- First 100 days of the second Trump presidency – Period from January to April 2025
- List of executive actions by Donald Trump
- Lists of presidential trips made by Donald Trump (international trips)
- Second presidential transition of Donald Trump – Transfer of presidential power from Joe Biden to Donald Trump
- Timeline of the 2024 United States presidential election

U.S. presidential administration timelines
Preceded by Second Trump presidency (2026 Q3)	Second Trump presidency (2026 Q4)	Succeeded by Second Trump presidency (2027 Q1)
