= 2026 alleged Iranian plot to assassinate Donald Trump =

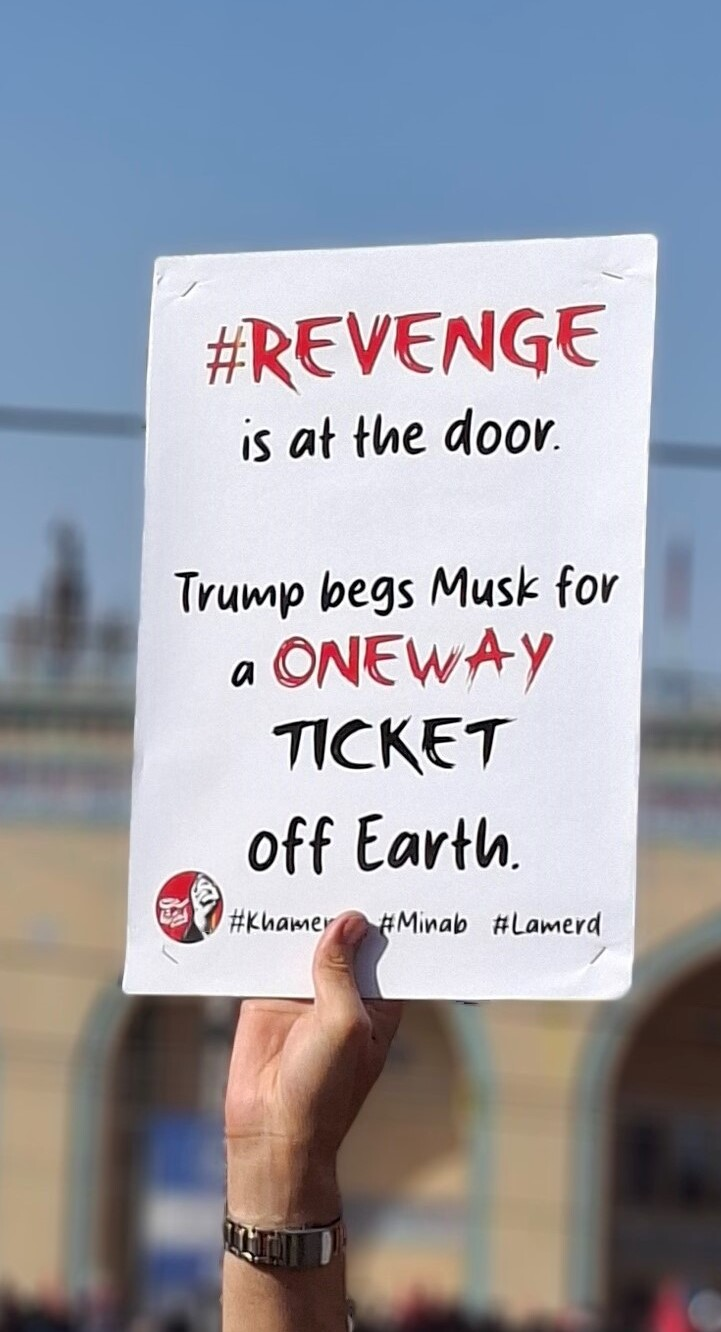
A mourner at the funeral of Iranian Supreme Leader Ali Khamenei holds a sign alluding to Trump's death.

On July 9, 2026, The Wall Street Journal published a report based on intelligence provided by Israel, which indicated that Iran planned to assassinate United States President Donald Trump in Ankara, Turkey. Trump stated that the plot was not a recent development and that Iran had included him on its assassination list for a long time. He asserted that Iran had been aiming at him since 2020, after the assassination of Qasem Soleimani.

"I’ve been on their target list for quite a while," Trump said to the New York Post on July 10, 2026. "That’s the situation we’re facing. The only difference is, I’ve issued the command — if anything occurs, we will strike them with bombings on a scale they have never experienced." A few days later, Mojtaba Khamenei declared that, in response to the people's demands, retribution for the assassination of Ali Khamenei was inevitable.

== Background ==
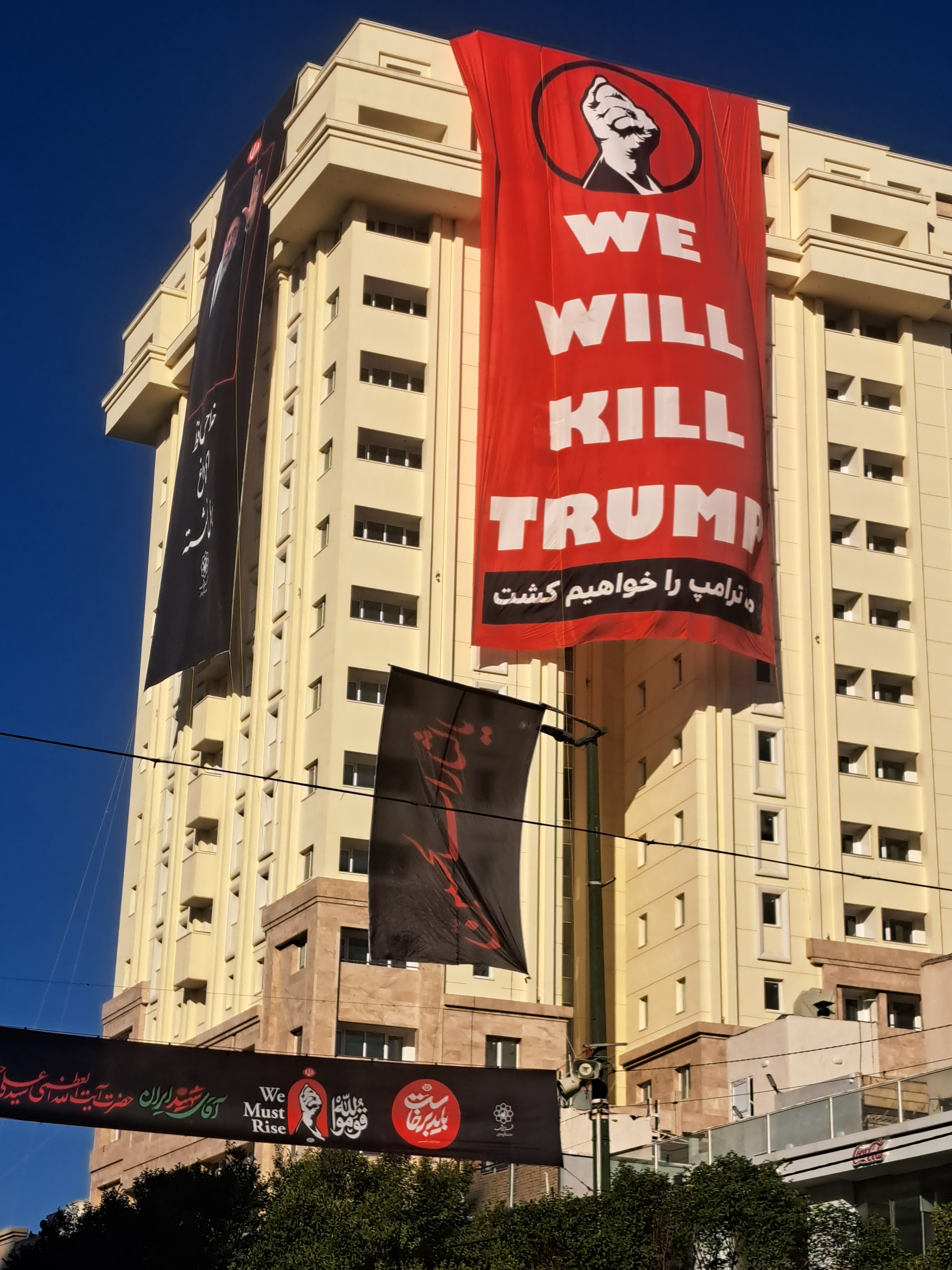
Banner reading "We Will Kill Trump" on a hotel in Mashhad, 10 July

Iran had already openly vowed to assassinate Trump after an American drone strike killed Qasem Soleimani, a top general in the Islamic Revolutionary Guard Corps, near the end of Trump's first term in 2020. In 2024, the Iranian government planned to assassinate Trump ahead of the presidential election via operative Farhad Shakeri, who was arrested and charged by Manhattan prosecutors with murder-for-hire and providing material support to a foreign terrorist organization. In the weekend prior to the WSJ's publication, mourners at Khamanei's funeral called for Trump's death and displayed a banner reading "We Will Kill Trump." A few days later, Ali Khamanei's son and predecessor Mojtaba Khamenei declared in a televised message that avenging his death was "the demand of the nation" and "must certainly" happen.

On July 9, 2026, The Wall Street Journal published a report stating that the Israeli government warned the U.S. of a new Iranian plot to assassinate Trump. Trump had alluded to assassination threats when speaking with reporters in Ankara the day prior, though he did not explicitly confirm the existence of a specific Iranian plot. He later said he was made aware of being ranked as Iran's top assassination target, though it is unclear if this was in reference to the warning from the Israeli government. Some U.S. officials suggested the Israeli report could have been intended to influence Trump's decision on whether to increase actions against Iran.

== Trump's reaction ==
On July 10, Trump reacted to the plot by stating that the U.S. military is prepared and that if the plan goes into effect, Iran will be annihilated. He asserted that "1,000 missiles are ready to be launched and targeted at the Islamic Republic of Iran, with thousands more set to be fired immediately."

=== Trump's plane change ===
In an interview in July 2026 at the NATO summit in Ankara, Turkey, Trump said he was at the top of Iran's assassination list, and reporting revealed that Israeli intelligence claimed Trump had specifically been targeted for assassination by Iran. Trump abruptly changed travel plans, returning home from Turkey reportedly on Air Force One instead of the donated Qatari jet he arrived in. The New York Times cited the new plane's poor security features as the reason for Trump's change of plane.

In August 2026, senior administration officials anonymously revealed that previous reporting was incorrect and Trump did not leave Turkey on Air Force One at all. Instead after boarding Air Force One, he was secretly transported out of the plane inside a catering container and ushered to a military jet. White House staff and journalists who remained on Air Force One were unaware of the switch and served as unwitting decoys to the threat. The military plane was flown to the United Kingdom, where Trump met up with Air Force One, disembarked in view of reporters and walked to the Qatari plane, which he then flew to Washington, D.C.

On August 12, Trump confirmed that he did switch out of Air Force One, claiming he followed Secret Service and military instructions to do so due to a possible Iranian threat, and mentioning that his replacement plane could be at greater risk. He stated, "Every major president faces many threats. I'm not concerned about anything."

According to the CBS News, U.S. intelligence identified the Iranian plot to attack the Air Force One with a surface-to-air missile.

People on board the decoy plane included Secretary of State Marco Rubio and Treasury Secretary Scott Bessent. People on board the secret plane together with the president included Defense Secretary Pete Hegseth and White House aides Natalie Harp, Walt Nauta and Dan Scavino.

==== Reactions ====
The decision to hide details of the swap from reporters flying on the "decoy" VC-25 aircraft was criticized by Democratic members of Congress, journalism advocacy groups and former government officials.

Senate Minority Leader Chuck Schumer issued a statement saying "It is unacceptable that Congress was kept in the dark and instead learned about this serious threat through press reports." Senator Chris Coons criticized the swap saying, "I understand putting a priority on the president's security, but frankly, this was just a despicable incident of disrespect for the press and for members of his own Cabinet." Former CIA director John Brennan said the White House had an "ethical requirement" to inform the reporters, noting that none of the presidents he worked for would have put the White House staff and press pool at risk in this way.

Colin P. Clark, executive director of the Soufan Center, asserted that implementing extraordinary protective measures for the president, potentially at the expense of others, signals Trump's vulnerability. He said that even measures such as ending the war cannot deter Iran from assassinating Trump.

== Advanced stages ==
After receiving intelligence that Iran is planning attacks on U.S. citizens, in October 2026 American officials warned their personnel in the Middle East, decreasing the number of staff at embassies and consulates. Secretary of State Marco Rubio was given a memo from the Director of National Intelligence highlighting an increased threat to U.S. personnel and noting that Iran's preparations for these attacks are well advanced. The assessment stated that the threat level was currently then the highest that it had been since the conflict began in February. The State Department said that it adjusts embassy staffing based on ongoing security evaluations. Current concerns, including threats from Houthi forces and Iranian plots against U.S. officials, have prompted the reduction in embassy staff. Travel advisories for 13 Middle Eastern countries have been updated, advising travelers to reconsider or cancel plans due to the risk of Houthi attacks and Iranian threats.

== See also ==
- Alleged Iranian attempts to assassinate Donald Trump
- Security incidents involving Donald Trump
