= The Great American Road Trip (2026 TV series) =

American reality TV travel series

- Genre: Reality television
- Presented by: Sean Duffy
- Country of origin: United States
- Original language: English
- No. of episodes: 6

Production
- Production companies: Great American Road Trip, Inc.

Great American Road Trip, Inc.
- Key people: Tori Barnes (executive director)
- Website: greatamericanroadtrip.org

The Great American Road Trip is an American reality television travel series, following U.S. secretary of Transportation Sean Duffy and his wife, Rachel Campos-Duffy, traveling the United States by car with their nine children.

The project drew criticism over conflicts of interest. Democratic senators questioned Duffy about the show at a Senate hearing on May 19, and six of them later asked the inspector general to open an investigation. The series itself received largely negative reviews and drew little viewership.

== Production ==
=== Development and filming ===
Secretary of Transportation Sean Duffy began traveling for The Great American Road Trip in October 2025. According to Duffy's wife, Rachel Campos-Duffy, they were prompted to film the series after President Donald Trump told members of his cabinet to "do something special" for the United States Semiquincentennial. The series was filmed in short bursts over a period of seven months.

=== Funding ===
The Great American Road Trip was funded by Great American Road Trip, Inc., a nonprofit organization funded by several companies, including: Google, the American Bus Association, the U.S. Travel Association, Chase Travel, Brand USA, CRH plc, the Electronic Payments Coalition, Boeing, Toyota, Shell, United Airlines, Comcast NBCUniversal, Royal Caribbean, Enterprise Rent-A-Car, Waymo, and Lyft. According to The Wall Street Journal, Boeing and Toyota donated US$1 million each. Several of the show's corporate sponsors are regulated by the United States Department of Transportation, which Duffy heads. Former transportation lobbyist Tori Barnes is the executive director of Great American Road Trip, Inc.

== Release ==
The Great American Road Trip was originally set to release on YouTube in June 2026, ahead of the United States Semiquincentennial. In July, a spokesperson for the Department of Transportation said the series would debut soon, but did not provide a date. In an August interview on NewsNation, Duffy said the show delayed by several weeks to further edit episodes into compliance with DoT ethics rules. In a trailer for the series, Duffy boards a Royal Caribbean cruise ship, one of the show's sponsors; the scene was not included in the show. The series debuted on YouTube on August 19, 2026.

== Summary ==
The series is six episodes long and follows U.S. secretary of Transportation Sean Duffy and his wife, Rachel Campos-Duffy, traveling the United States by car with their nine children and their son-in-law, a congressional candidate. Each episode runs between 20 to 35 minutes.

=== Episode 1 "Where America Began" ===
The first episode, "Where America Began", begins in Washington, D.C., where the Duffy family meets with president Donald Trump in the Oval Office. The family then travels to Philadelphia, visiting the Liberty Bell and meeting with secretary of the Interior Doug Burgum. They get cheesesteaks and visit Independence Hall and the National Constitution Center. The episode ends with the family sprinting up the Rocky Steps at the Philadelphia Museum of Art. Footage of the Duffy family praying before meals and before bed is interspersed between scenes.

=== Episode 2 "College Dreams and a Homecoming" ===
In episode two, "College Dreams and a Homecoming", the family visits Boston. They meet with former The Real World castmate Montana McGlynn at the Real World house, where Duffy lived when he was on the MTV reality show Road Rules: All Stars. Duffy and Campos-Duffy have a discussion with their daughter Paloma about her college plans. Paloma aims to attend Boston College or Harvard University, which Duffy and Campos-Duffy disapprove of, stating that attending a liberal school could undermine her conservative upbringing and that Harvard "professionalized how they can take good young girls like you and corrupt their minds". The family tours Boston College and Harvard University; at Harvard, they visit the Catholic Center and meet with a campus priest. The family then attend a football game between the Merchant Marine Academy and the Coast Guard at Fenway Park. Former secretary of Homeland Security Kristi Noem attended the game alongside the family, but footage was cut from the show.

=== Episode 3 "Winter in the Wild" ===
Episode three, "Winter in the Wild", takes place in Wyoming and Montana. The family visits Yellowstone National Park, where they witness a herd of bison and go snowmobiling; Yellowstone Vacations was a sponsor of the show. Valentina, who has Down syndrome and is the family's youngest daughter, takes a skiing lesson at an adaptive ski school. Youngest child Patrick is taken to an emergency room after contracting a stomach ache. Oldest daughter Evita, who was pregnant, and her husband Michael Alfonso, a congressional candidate in Wisconsin's 7th congressional district, learn the sex of their child.

=== Episode 4 "By Land, Sea and Sky" ===
In episode four, "By Land, Sea and Sky", the family visits Charleston. There, they visit a Boeing factory that produces the 787 Dreamliner; Boeing sponsors the show. They also visit an aquarium and a coffee shop that hires people with intellectual and developmental disabilities. Reality star Naomie Olindo meets with the family at a restaurant, where they discuss the benefits of credit card reward points.

=== Episode 5 "Big Roads, Bigger Adventures" ===
Episode five, "Big Roads, Bigger Adventures", takes place in Texas. Duffy visits Texas Materials, an asphalt and concrete company owned by CRH, a sponsor of the show. Campos-Duffy shops at a western clothing store in Fort Worth. The family visits a dude ranch, where Duffy vaccinates cows and other family members take archery lessons. They visit the Fort Worth Stockyards and Billy Bob's Texas, where they learn to line dance.

=== Episode 6 "Family, Memories and the Road Ahead" ===
Episode six, "Family, Memories and the Road Ahead", takes place in Arizona; the Arizona Office of Tourism sponsored the episode. It was filmed on Duffy and Campos-Duffy's 27th wedding anniversary. Campos-Duffy gives relationship advice, stating, "The key to a good, long-lasting marriage is to marry somebody very good-looking that you're attracted to". The family travels Route 66 and visits the Grand Canyon; a resort operator at the canyon was a sponsor. While driving on the road, Paloma learns that she's been accepted into the University of Chicago. The family has breakfast at Campos-Duffy's parents' home. They then take a bus, sponsored by the American Bus Association, to Phoenix, where they visit a hub for the autonomous driving company Waymo, another one of the show's sponsors. The family then visit a chapel on the Arizona State University campus where Duffy and Campos-Duffy married, and the couple renew their vows.

== Reception ==
=== Critical and audience response ===
Writing for The New York Times, Vanessa Friedman wrote that The Great American Road Trip was an instance of "celluloid self-branding" by individuals associated with Donald Trump. The Guardian called the series "startlingly self-involved." A Rolling Stone headline dubbed the series "peak MAGA cringe." Alex Krinsky of Consequence wrote that "almost nobody is watching" the show, noting that after one day, the most viewed episode of the show had drawn 2,900 views on YouTube.

Former Secretary of Transportation Pete Buttigieg wrote on social media that the series was "brutally out of touch".

In August 2026, John Oliver devoted a segment of Last Week Tonight with John Oliver to the series, saying it was "god awful" and "ethically dubious" because it was funded by companies that Duffy's portfolio oversees and regulates, examples include Boeing and Toyota, who each reportedly donated $1 million to the nonprofit that funded the show.

=== Ethical concerns ===
The Great American Road Trip presented ethical concerns for the United States Department of Transportation. In May 2026, Citizens for Responsibility and Ethics in Washington submitted a complaint to the Office of Inspector General for the Department of Transportation over the participation of Sean Duffy and his family, in addition to possible conflicts of interest over the funding of the show. Critics say the Duffy family was compensated in corporate-sponsored perks, such as flights, hotel rooms and a cruise. Duffy was questioned by Democratic senators at a congressional budget hearing in May 2026 over the show and Washington senator Patty Murray criticized the show as out of touch due to increased fuel prices as a result of the Iran war.

A pitch deck obtained by Politico showed that prospective sponsors were asked to contribute amounts of between $100,000 to $1 million, with at least one prospective sponsor declining over the ethical implications of seeming to buy access to Duffy, according to a person involved in the outreach.
