= Ana C. Reyes =

American judge (born 1974)

Ana Reyes
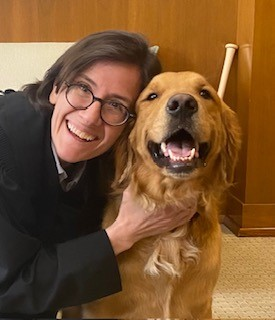
- Reyes and her dog, Scout

Judge of the United States District Court for the District of Columbia
- Incumbent
- Assumed office February 21, 2023
- Appointed by: Joe Biden
- Preceded by: Colleen Kollar-Kotelly

Personal details
- Born: Ana Cecilia Reyes; 1974 (age 51–52) Montevideo, Uruguay
- Education: Transylvania University (BA); Johns Hopkins University (MPP); Harvard University (JD)

Ana Cecilia Reyes (born 1974) is an Uruguayan-born American lawyer who has served as United States district judge of the United States District Court for the District of Columbia since 2023. She was nominated to the position by President Joe Biden, and is both the first Latina and the first openly LGBTQ person to serve as a district court judge in Washington, D.C.

== Early life and education ==
Reyes was born in 1974 in Montevideo, Uruguay. She moved to Spain and later immigrated to Louisville, Kentucky, as a child. After her arrival in the United States, her first-grade teacher helped her learn English. She received media attention in 2020 for reuniting with her first-grade teacher after over 40 years.

Reyes graduated from Transylvania University in 1996 with a Bachelor of Science, summa cum laude. From 1996 to 1997, Reyes worked for Feminist Majority Foundation on its unsuccessful drive to defeat the 1996 California Proposition 209, which sought to prohibit state governmental institutions from considering race, sex, or ethnicity, specifically in the areas of public employment, public contracting, and public education.

Reyes then attended Harvard Law School, where she was an editor of the Harvard Law Review and a semi-finalist in the Ames Moot Court Competition. She graduated in 2000 with a Juris Doctor, magna cum laude. Reyes later received a master's in international public policy from the Paul H. Nitze School of Advanced International Studies, with honors, in 2014.

== Career ==
After law school, Reyes served as a law clerk for Judge Amalya Kearse of the United States Court of Appeals for the Second Circuit from 2000 to 2001. She then entered private practice at the law firm Williams & Connolly, becoming a partner in 2009. Reyes focused on cross-border legal issues and international arbitration, while also taking on pro bono work to represent asylum seekers and refugee organizations. The Women's Bar Association of the District of Columbia named her "Woman Lawyer of the Year" in 2017. In September 2021, Chief Judge Beryl Howell asked Reyes to serve as the Chair of the Magistrate Judge Merit Selection Panel. Reyes is known to bring her pet Golden Retriever, Scout, to work.

=== Notable cases as lawyer ===
In 2008, on behalf of the Center for Gender and Refugee Studies, Reyes filed a brief in support of three Guinean women seeking asylum in the U.S. In 2018, Reyes was part of the legal team challenging the Trump administration's restrictions on refugees entering the United States through ports of entry. In 2021, Reyes represented Spain in a dispute over the country's decision to withdraw economic incentives for renewable projects. In 2021, Reyes represented pharmaceutical company Merck & Co. in a suit alleging that diabetes drugs manufactured by the company cause pancreatic cancer. In 2022, Reyes represented a Medtronic subsidiary in a court case by patients alleging they were injured by the company's hernia mesh products.

=== Federal judicial service ===
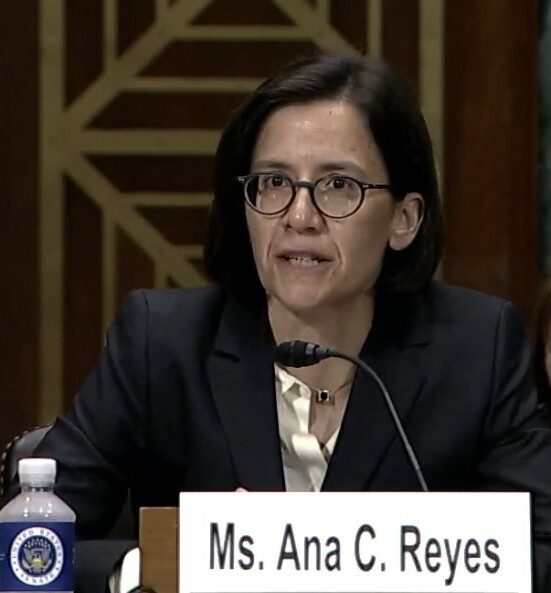
Reyes in 2022

On April 27, 2022, President Joe Biden announced his intent to nominate Reyes to serve as a United States district judge of the United States District Court for the District of Columbia. She had been recommended for the position by Delegate Eleanor Holmes Norton. On May 19, 2022, her nomination was sent to the Senate. President Biden nominated Reyes to the seat being vacated by Judge Colleen Kollar-Kotelly, who announced her intention to assume senior status upon confirmation of a successor. A hearing on her nomination was held before the Senate Judiciary Committee on June 22, 2022. On August 4, 2022, her nomination reported out of committee by a 11–9–2 vote.

On January 3, 2023, Reyes' nomination was returned to the President under Rule XXXI, Paragraph 6 of the United States Senate; she was renominated later the same day. On February 2, 2023, her nomination was reported out of committee by an 11–9 vote. On February 15, 2023, the Senate invoked cloture on her nomination by a 52–47 vote. Later that day, her nomination was confirmed by a 51–47 vote. She received her judicial commission on February 21, 2023. Reyes was sworn in on February 22, 2023. She became the first Hispanic woman and openly LGBTQ person to serve as a district court judge in Washington, D.C.

=== Notable rulings ===
==== Position on Hunter Biden investigation ====
Reyes criticized the United States Department of Justice (DOJ) in the House Select Committee on April 5, 2024, for refusing to allow attorneys involved in the Hunter Biden laptop controversy to comply with subpoenas issued by House Republicans. She accused the DOJ of hypocrisy in prosecuting Trump administration official Peter Navarro, noting that he had been imprisoned for not complying with House committee subpoenas.

==== Trump tax return whistleblower case ====
In January 2024, Reyes sentenced Charles E. Littlejohn, who leaked the tax returns of Donald Trump along with several other wealthy taxpayers to the media, to five years in prison. Reyes denounced Littlejohn's decision to leak Trump's tax returns as a "an attack on our constitutional democracy", stating: "When you target the sitting president of the United States, you're targeting the office and when you're targeting the office of the president of the United States, you're targeting democracy—you're targeting our constitutional system of government." Reyes added that Trump was under no legal obligation to release his tax returns, compared the whistleblower's actions to the January 6 United States Capitol attack. During the trial, Reyes told Littlejohn that "I have reacted so strongly to your case because it engenders the same fear that Jan. 6 does". Reyes' decision to sentence Littlejohn to five years in prison received attention for being over six to twelve times longer than the four-to ten-month sentence recommended by the United States Federal Sentencing Guidelines.

==== Assa Abloy antitrust case ====
In 2023, Reyes presided over an antitrust case brought by the DOJ against Assa Abloy's acquisition of Spectrum Brands' hardware and home improvement (HHI) division. Reyes reportedly favored the lawsuit ending in a settlement rather than a trial. During the trial, Reyes indicated interest in reinterpreting the burden of proof in "litigate-the fix" merger cases; while the burden is generally on merging companies to prove a deal would not harm competition, Reyes expressed interest for putting the burden of proof on DOJ lawyers.

==== Second Trump administration ====
Reyes heard Storch v. Hegseth about the 2025 dismissals of U.S. inspectors general.

In Trump v. Miot, Reyes blocked the second Trump administration from terminating Temporary protected status of Haitians in the United States.

Reyes heard DC Preservation League v. Department of Interior about the Trump administration and the East Potomac Park Golf Course.

Reyes heard Iranian American Legal Defense Fund v. Rubio about the Trump administration deporting Iranians to Iran.

===== Transgender military ban =====
In February 2025, Reyes presided over hearings for a preliminary injunction against President Trump's Executive Order 14183, which banned transgender people from serving in the military. During the hearings, Reyes described that order as an attempt to label "an entire category of people dishonest, dishonorable, undisciplined, immodest, who lack integrity – people who have taken an oath to defend this country, who have been under fire, people who have taken fire for this country", saying that it showed an "unadulterated animus" towards the transgender community, and that portions of it were "frankly ridiculous". On February 21, 2025, the DOJ filed a judicial misconduct complaint against Reyes signed by Chad Mizelle. The complaint, submitted to the DC Circuit, alleges that Reyes displayed "hostile and egregious misconduct" during the hearings. Specific claims include alleged inappropriate language such as questioning a DOJ attorney's religious beliefs. The complaint was dismissed by Chief Judge Sri Srinivasan of the U.S. Court of Appeals for the District of Columbia Circuit on September 29, 2025.

== Selected publications ==
- Reyes, Ana C. (2011). "Representing Torture Victims and Other Asylum Seekers". Litigation. 37 (4): 23–27. ISSN 0097-9813. JSTOR 23075539.

== See also ==
- List of Hispanic and Latino American jurists
- List of LGBT jurists in the United States

Legal offices
| Preceded by Colleen Kollar-Kotelly | Judge of the United States District Court for the District of Columbia; 2023–present | Incumbent |
