= Alleged Iranian attempts to assassinate Donald Trump =

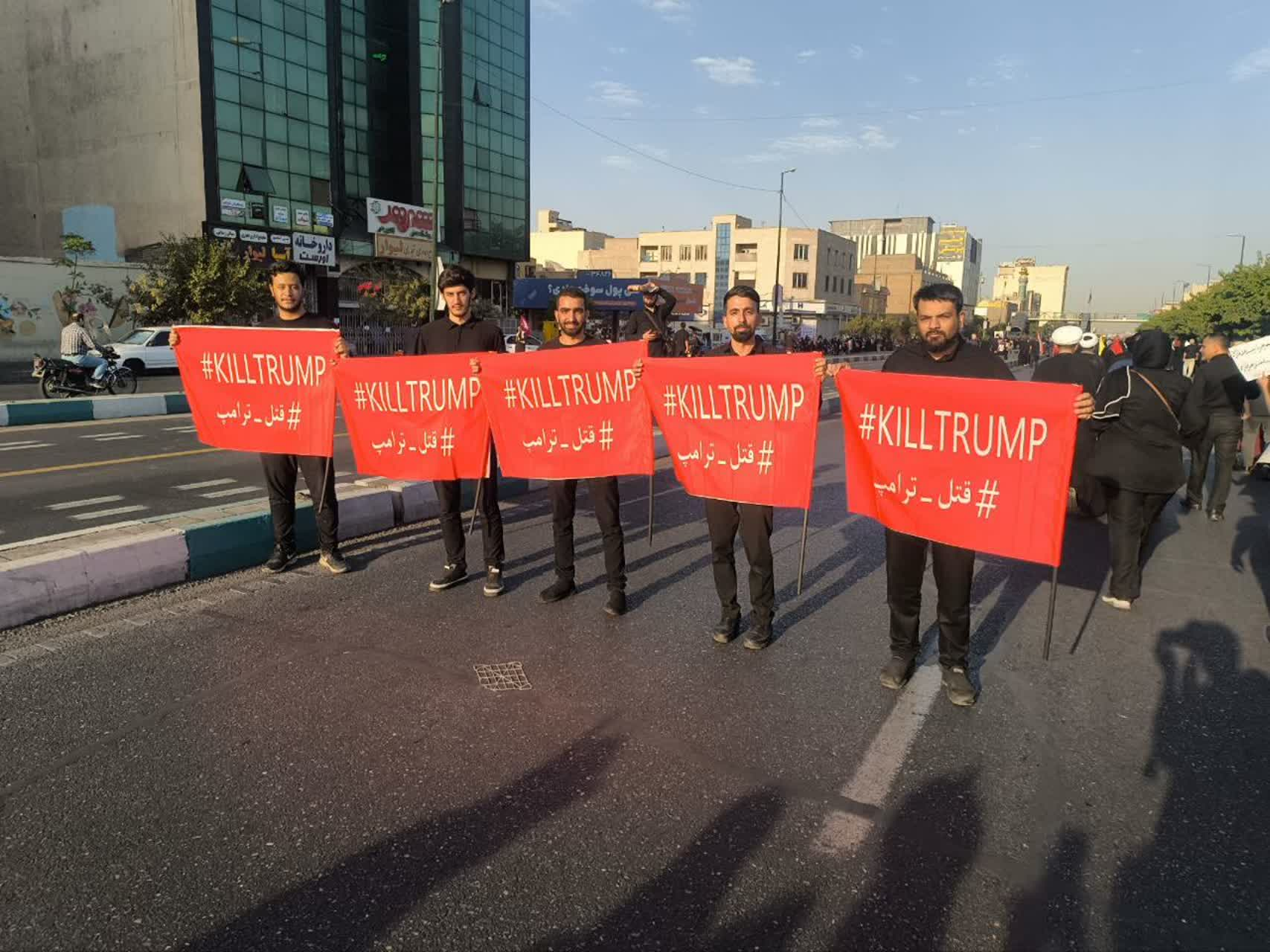
Participants holding "#KILLTRUMP" banners during the State funeral of Ali Khamenei procession in Tehran on July 7, 2026.

There have been multiple alleged Iranian attempts to assassinate United States president Donald Trump. U.S. law enforcement and intelligence agencies have tracked evidence for years of Iranian efforts to target President Donald Trump, beginning with the assassination of Qasem Soleimani in 2020, with signals only increasing since the start of the 2026 Iran war. Iran's new Supreme Leader Mojtaba Khamenei has said that revenge for his father's assassination "will most certainly be carried out." President Trump has issued a warning to Iran on July 10, 2026, stating that 1,000 missiles are "locked and loaded" should any attempt be made to assassinate the sitting U.S. president.

== Background ==
According to a report by the United States Institute of Peace, "Iran has assassinated its enemies across four continents — in Asia, Europe, North America and South America — over the four decades since the 1979 revolution." Iran is said to have begun plotting against Trump's life following the assassination of Qasem Soleimani in 2020. In October 2024, the Biden administration warned Iran that the US would consider any retaliatory assassination attempts by Iran on Trump's life an act of war.

== July 2024 arrest in Houston ==
On July 12, 2024, a Pakistani man with connections to Iran, Asif Merchant, was arrested in Houston and charged with recruiting people to help kill Trump, on behalf of Iran's Islamic Revolutionary Guard Corps (IRGC). One of the recruits turned into an informant for the FBI. On March 6, 2026, Merchant was convicted in New York City of murder for hire in the plot to kill Trump. Merchant testified that he participated unwillingly to protect his family in Tehran, whereas the Iranian government denied involvement.

== November 2024 plot ==
On November 8, 2024, the U.S. Department of Justice charged Farhad Shakeri, an Afghani citizen, along with Carlisle Rivera and Jonathan Loadholt (whom Shakeri had met in a U.S. prison) in connection with another murder-for-hire plot, as revenge for the killing of Soleimani. Shakeri allegedly told an undercover FBI agent that an IRGC official urged him to "set aside other efforts" to focus on Trump. Rivera and Loadholt were arrested in November 2024 and convicted on related charges in January 2026, whereas Shakeri remains at large.

== July 2026 plot ==
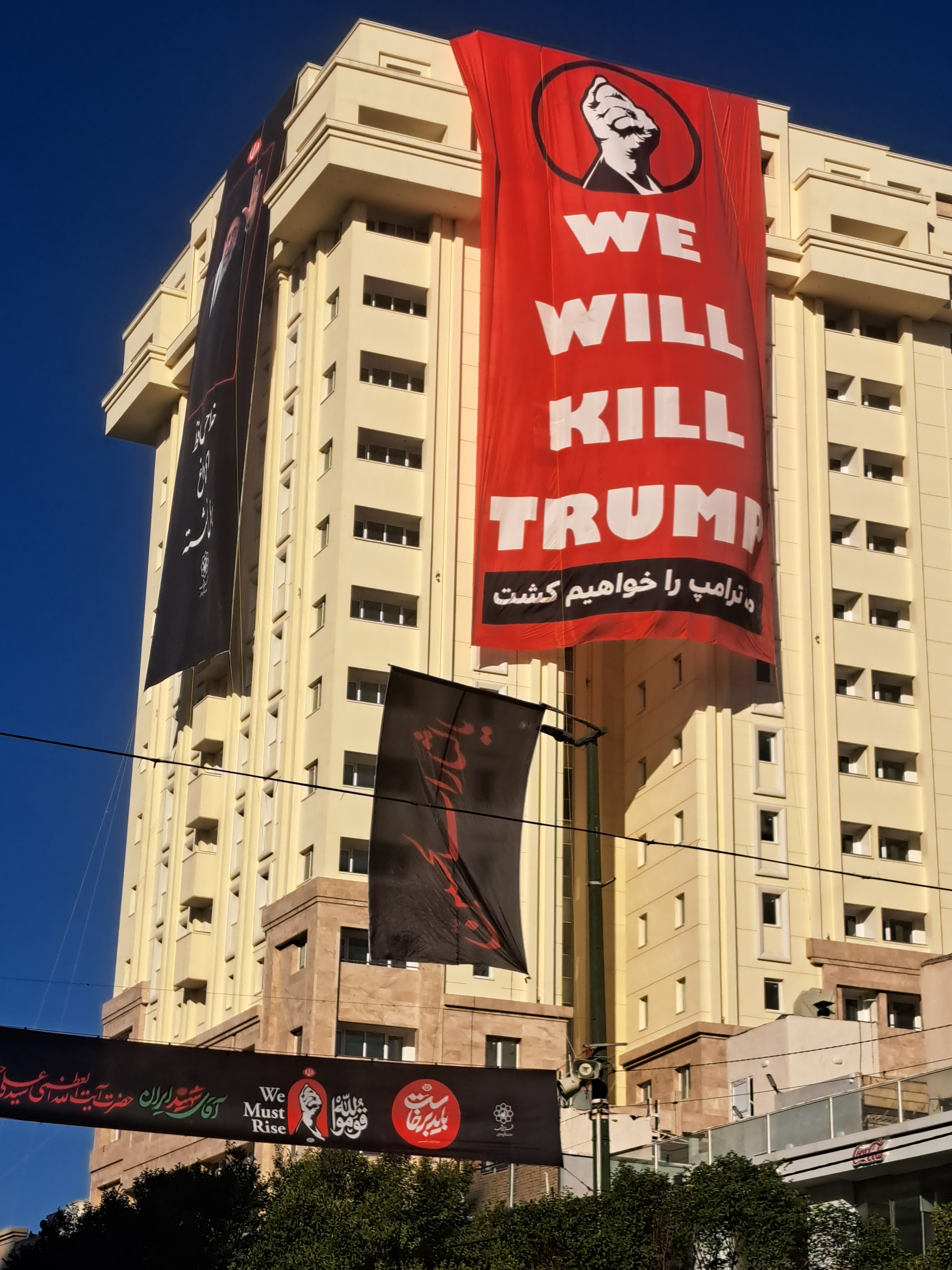
We Will Kill Trump banner on a building in Mashhad, 10 July 2026

In July 2026, Israel provided the United States with an intelligence report alleging that Iran had developed a new plot to assassinate Trump in Ankara, Turkey, where he was attending a NATO summit. The claims were first reported by The Wall Street Journal. Trump said that Iran put him on a hit list where he is listed as the top target. When Trump was asked about the plot by the media, he said, "They want to take out the US leader—me, I'm on whatever list. I saw this morning I'm on every single one of their lists".

== See also ==
- Security incidents involving Donald Trump
