= East Potomac Park Golf Course =

Golfing venue in East Potomac Park, Washington, D.C., United States

East Potomac Golf Links
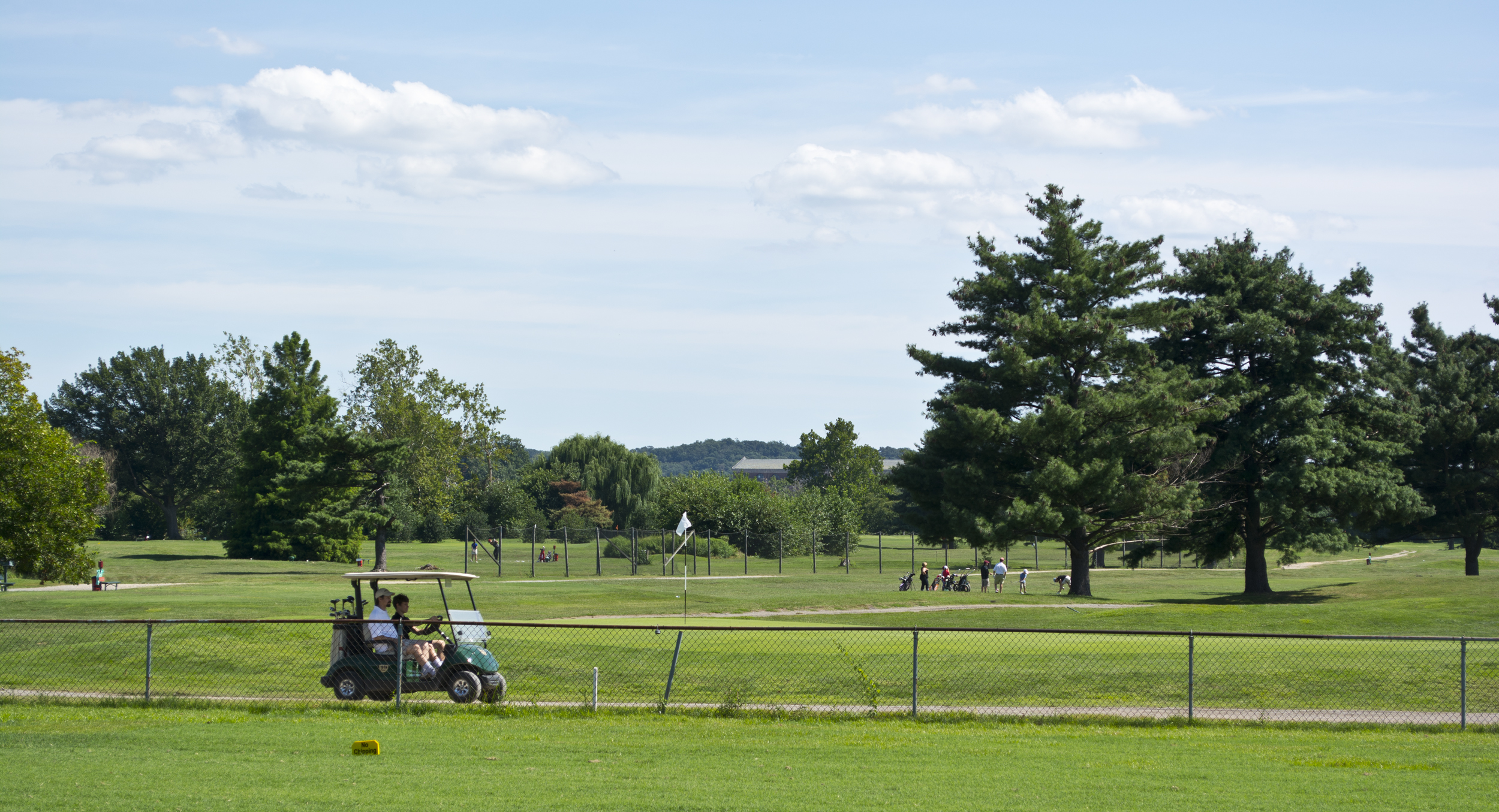
- Looking south along the Blue Course fairway at the Red Course fairway in 2013
- Interactive map of East Potomac Golf Links
- 38°52′13″N 77°01′35″W

Club information
- Location: East Potomac Park, Washington, D.C.
- Established: 1923
- Type: Public
- Operator: National Links Trust / Troon Golf
- Tournaments: 1923 U.S. Amateur Public Links
- Website: https://www.playdcgolf.com/

Red Course (9 holes)
- Designer: Robert White
- Par: 27
- Length: 1,142 yards (1,044 m)

Blue Course (18 holes)
- Designer: Walter Travis
- Par: 72
- Length: 6,599 yards (6,034 m)
- Course rating: 70.5

White Course (9 holes)
- Designer: Robert White
- Par: 31
- Length: 2,420 yards (2,210 m)

East Potomac Golf Links (also locally known as East Potomac Golf Course or formally as East Potomac Park Golf Center) is a golf course located in East Potomac Park in Washington, D.C., United States. The course includes an 18-hole course, two 9-hole courses, and a miniature golf course. It is the busiest of the city's three golf courses (all of which are publicly owned). The original nine-hole course opened in 1921, and the miniature golf course in 1930 (making it one of the oldest miniature golf courses in the nation). Additional holes opened in stages between 1921 and 1925, leaving the course with 36 holes in all.

Services at East Potomac Golf Links include a pro shop, snack bar, putting greens, three practice holes, and a two-tiered, 100-stall driving range (26 of which are heated). The course is generally flat and easy, although drainage can be poor. The views of the city's many monuments and memorials from the course at East Potomac are considered some of the best in the city.

== History ==
A municipal golf course in East Potomac Park was first proposed in February 1911, just as East Potomac Park itself was nearing completion. The Washington Chamber of Commerce made a formal request of the U.S. Army Corps of Engineers in March 1913 to build a course, and the Corps gave its approval a month later. These plans were put on hold due to World War I. Temporary barracks for soldiers were built on the land, and the remaining space used for victory gardens. With the end of the war in sight, the Corps revived plans to build a golf course. By March 1919, construction on a nine-hole course was well under way. The course opened on March 15, 1921. President Warren G. Harding was one of the first golfers to play the course.

Golfers participating in the U.S. Amateur Public Links Championship at the East Potomac Park Golf Course, June 23, 1923

Between 1921 and 1922, a five-hole course was opened, and in late 1922 four more holes were opened to bring the total to 18 holes. Another nine holes opened on May 30, 1925.

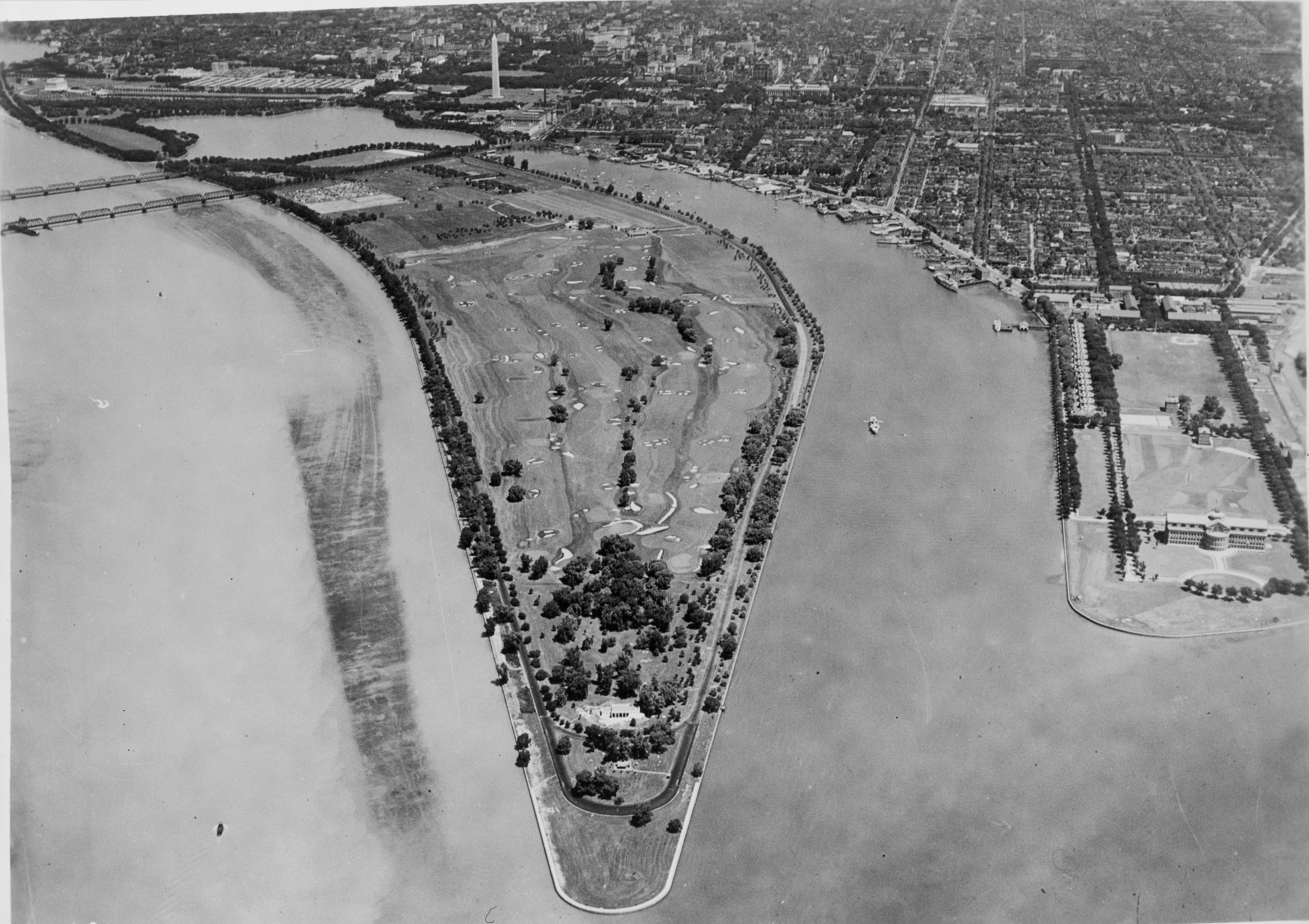
Aerial view of East Potomac Golf Links from the south end of Hains Point (1935).

Like all but one golf course in Washington, D.C., from 1900 to 1955, East Potomac Park Golf Course was racially segregated, and barred African Americans from using the course. In 1941, several black golfers attempted to play at East Potomac Park Golf Course, but were attacked by whites throwing stones and threatening them with more violence. African American golfers petitioned United States Secretary of the Interior Harold L. Ickes for permission to play at the course, which Ickes granted. In July, three black golfers (accompanied by six United States Marshals) played the course, but were jeered and threatened with assault. But with Ickes unable to provide such high levels of protection all the time, African American golfers rarely attempted to play there until the city's golf courses were desegregated in 1955.

Looking across White and Red Courses, East Potomac Park Golf Course, August 25, 2013

=== First Trump presidency ===
In 2020, the National Park Service signed an agreement with National Links Trust to operate the course along with the two other courses located in DC. They will also work to redesign and rebuild both the White and Red courses, redesign the driving range, construct an 18-hole putting course and restore the clubhouse.

=== Second Trump presidency ===
In 2025, East Potomac was the busiest course in the DC area, hosting 124,500 rounds of golf, according to National Trust Links. At the end of 2025, the Trump administration prematurely terminated the lease agreement for this course and for the other two courses managed by the National Links Trust. In May 2026, Donald Trump proposed expanding the public course at East Potomac into an 18-hole professional course. He then committed to federal contracts, estimated at $20–$49 million, without notifying Congress.

In September 2026, the administration awarded a contract to Vanasse Hangen Brustlin, Inc. to perform environmental and historic preservation compliance work. In mid October 2026, some 529 trees, including healthy mature oaks and maples were cut down. Notice had been filed on a Friday afternoon, and the tree cutting began the following morning. The National Park Service had previously stated in legal filings that the work would occur in phases to restore historic character and re-open views of nearby landmarks. Area residents expressed concern about the affordable public golf course's imminent closure and reconstruction for elite clients. Two days after the work, US District Judge Ana Reyes scolded the Trump administration legal team for lack of proper notice before beginning the tree removal, citing the ongoing law suit and stating that the government had lost all credibility in the case. In a court filing challenging the judge's handling of the case, the park service estimated the total number of trees to be removed was 729. On October 18, Trump posted detailed plans to create a new course from the three existing courses and said the courses would close on November 15 for 15 months. The next day he posted on Truth Social that the work would begin "immediately". After a November 13 court hearing, Reyes issued a temporary restraining order to delay any work or closure of East Potomac Park and the East Potomac Golf Course for two weeks.

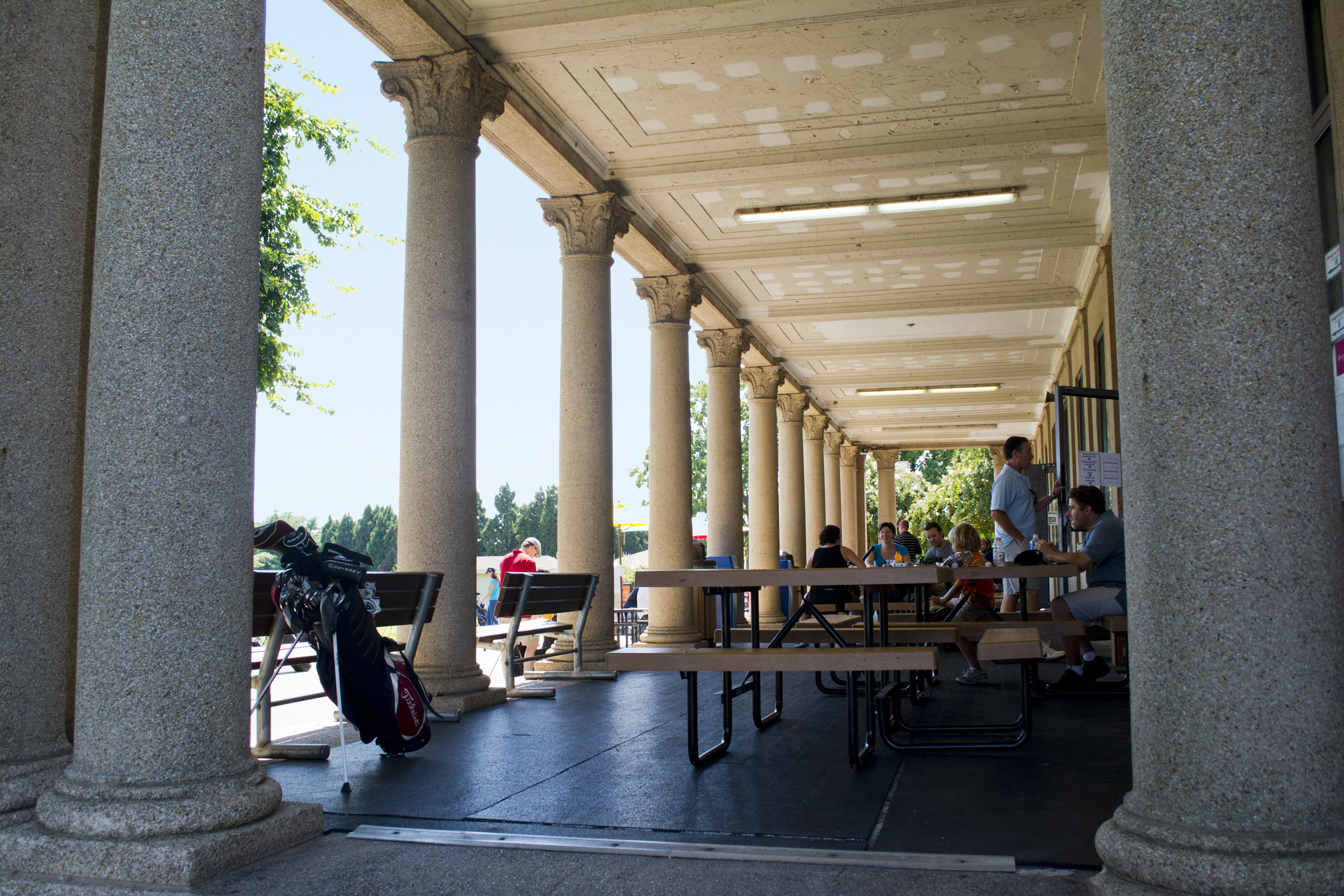
Clubhouse veranda of East Potomac Golf Links (2013).

== Facilities ==
Potomac Grille is a no-frills cafeteria at East Potomac Golf Course. It caters to members of the public as well as patrons of the golf course. In May 2017, The Washington Post's Going Out Guide wrote that the bacon cheeseburger at Potomac Grille was one of the city's best hamburgers under $10.

== Bibliography ==
- "Add 4 Holes to Park Course." The Washington Post. March 16, 1922.
- "Assures Golf Course." The Washington Post. April 15, 1913.
- Bednar, Michael J. L'Enfant's Legacy: Public Open Spaces in Washington, D.C. Baltimore, Md.: Johns Hopkins University Press, 2006.
- Butko, Brian and Butko, Sarah. Roadside Attractions: Cool Cafés, Souvenir Stands, Route 66 Relics, and Other Road Trip Fun. Mechanicsburg, PA: Stackpole Books, 2007.
- "Col. Harts Plans to Help Golfers." The Washington Post. March 25, 1917.
- Dawkins, Marvin P. and Kinloch, Graham Charles. African American Golfers During the Jim Crow Era. Westport, Conn.: Praeger, 2000.
- "District of Columbia." The Washington Post. May 4, 2007.
- "Favor Potomac Park." The Washington Post. March 24, 1913.
- Fitzpatrick, Sandra and Goodwin, Maria R. The Guide to Black Washington: Places and Events of Historical and Cultural Significance in the Nation's Capital. New York: Hippocrene Books, 2001.
- "Golfers Here Throng Public Links Opening." The Washington Post. March 15, 1925.
- Keller, John B. "Public Links to be Ready May 1." The Washington Post. March 5, 1919.
- Kirsch, George G. Golf in America. Urbana, Ill.: University of Illinois Press, 2009.
- "Potomac Park Golf Course Will Open." The Washington Post. March 13, 1921.
- "President Harding Paying Fee for Game Of Golf on Potomac Park Public Links." The Washington Post. April 6, 1921.
- "Public Golf Is Urged." The Washington Post. February 18, 1911.
- Wasserman, Paul and Hausrath, Don. Washington, D.C., from A to Z: The Traveler's Look-Up Source for the Nation's Capital. Sterling, Va.: Capital Books, 2003.
