= Timeline of the second Trump presidency (2026 Q2) =

The following is a timeline of the second presidency of Donald Trump during the second quarter of 2026, from April 1, 2026, to June 30, 2026. To navigate between quarters, see timeline of the Donald Trump presidencies. For the Q3 timeline see timeline of the second Trump presidency (2026 Q3).

== Timeline ==
=== April 2026 ===
Date	Events	Photos/videos
Wednesday April 1	President Trump attends the oral arguments at the Supreme Court, a first in the official records, in the case Trump vs. Barbara on birthright citizenship.; NASA launches Artemis II to fly by the Moon, the first crewed deep-space mission in 54 years.; President Trump delivers prime time speech regarding Iran conflict.; Democratic Party leaders filed a suit, in an attempt to block President Trump's attempted limiting of mail in voting ahead of mid-term elections.	President Trump compares himself as a king during a speech celebrating Easter. The video of the speech has since been privated. President Trump delivers an address to the nation.
Thursday April 2	President Trump fires Attorney General Pam Bondi after she leaks sensitive information regarding an investigation into Eric Swalwell in addition to her handling of Epstein files. She is temporarily replaced by Todd Blanche.; Defense Secretary Pete Hegseth requests that Army Chief of Staff Gen. Randy George step down and take immediate retirement. The heads of the Army's Transformation and Training Command and Chaplain Corps, Gen David Hodne and William Green Jr., were also removed.; The Trump administration imposed new tariffs on branded drugs from pharmaceutical companies that have not struck deals with the US to lower US drug prices.; Former FBI agent and Jan 6 rioter charged with incitement of violence Jared Wise resigns from the Department of Justice's Weaponization Working Group.	
Friday April 3	President Trump requested $1.15 trillion in base defense budget spending from Congress.; A US F-15E fighter jet from the 494th squadron was shot down over Iran in first incident since the start of the Iran conflict. The pilot was rescued shortly afterwards, with the other crew member reported as rescued early April 5.	
Saturday April 4		
Sunday April 5	President Trump posted a profanity-heavy post to Truth Social threatening Iran over the continued closure of the Strait of Hormuz and celebrated the rescue of a missing US airman.	
Monday April 6	President Trump and First Lady Melania Trump host the White House Easter Egg Roll.; During a conference, President Trump threatened to jail all journalists at an unnamed news outlet who first reported the status of the second missing airman from F-15E fighter jet. Trump framed it as the airman's status was a national security issue.; Democratic representative Yassamin Ansari announced her intent to introduce impeachment articles against Defense Secretary Pete Hegseth, citing the Iran war and repeated perceived violations of his oath of office and the Constitution.; The Department of Education announced the termination of agreements with certain school districts and colleges where Title IX had been interpreted to include protections for transgender and LGBTQ+ students.	President Trump and First Lady Melania Trump host the White House Easter Egg Roll.
Tuesday April 7	Referring to an 8 p.m. EDT deadline for a deal with Iran, Trump posted, "A whole civilization will die tonight, never to be brought back again." Legal experts say Trump's threatened attacks on critical infrastructure would be considered war crimes.; Following President Trump's post, Pope Leo XIV condemned the statement, stating it was "truly unacceptable" and the war was "unjust."; More than 50 Democratic members of Congress, raised calls for Trump's cabinet to invoke the 25th amendment to remove a president deemed unfit for office after his response to the Iran war. Gov. JB Pritzker, former Republican representative Marjorie Taylor Greene, Candace Owens and Alex Jones also joined the calls.; Vice President Vance visits Hungary to support Hungarian Prime Minister Viktor Orbán ahead of the upcoming parliamentary election.; Vice President Vance says that the Iran war will conclude soon.; President Trump announces on Truth Social that a two-week ceasefire with Iran has been reached, two hours before his deadline.; Democratic representative John Larson announced that he had filled articles of impeachment against President Trump for the Iran war.	
Wednesday April 8	Vice President Vance spoke out against allegations that the US is attempting to interfere in Hungary's elections as he had arrived in the country a week before the elections. Vance had spent the day speaking at a thinktank and education center linked to leader Viktor Orban.; Defense secretary Pete Hegseth held a briefing at the Pentagon about the Iran ceasefire claiming that the Iranian military was defeated and that the US military would remain in the area.; President Trump holds a bilateral meeting with NATO Secretary General Mark Rutte at the White House. Before and after the meeting Trump complained about NATO and perceived lack of response in the Iran war.; President Trump spoke with Israeli Prime Minister Benjamin Netanyahu via the phone to ask for the scaling back of Israeli strikes on Lebanon to ensure the success of the Iran ceasefire.	
Thursday April 9	First Lady Melania Trump issued a public statement that she "never had a relationship" with Jeffrey Epstein or Ghislaine Maxwell, and called on Congress to provide the Epstein survivors with a public hearing.; A federal judge blocks a second attempt to limit press access at the Pentagon. In his ruling, Judge Paul Friedman calls the new restrictions "rather transparent attempts to negate the impact of this court’s order."	First Lady Melania Trump issued a public statement that she "never had a relationship" with Jeffrey Epstein or Ghislaine Maxwell, and called on Congress to provide the Epstein survivors with a public hearing.
Friday April 10	Federal Judge Roopal Patel was fired from her position following her ruling that the Trump administration had no grounds to deport Rümeysa Öztürk.	
Saturday April 11	Iran and the United States hold ceasefire talks in Islamabad, Pakistan, making it the first highest-level engagement between the two countries since the Iranian Revolution in 1979. The U.S. delegation is led by Vice President Vance.; The U.S. Central Command says that the U.S. Navy Arleigh Burke-class destroyers USS Frank Peterson and USS Michael Murphy have crossed the Strait of Hormuz to ensure the strait is clear of sea mines.	
Sunday April 12	Vice President Vance returned home from Islamabad, having failed to reach a deal in ceasefire negotiations. In response, Trump and the U.S. military announced it would blockade all shipping maritime traffic entering and exiting Iranian ports.; After a lengthy post on Truth Social criticizing Pope Leo, President Trump posted an AI-generated image depicting himself as a Christ-like figure healing a sick man. He deleted the latter post the next day following backlash from his supporters, though he later claimed he thought the image was depicting himself as a medical doctor.	The AI-generated image President Trump posted on Truth Social seemingly depicting himself as Jesus Christ.
Monday April 13	Members of President Trump's Religious Liberty Commission criticized the idea of a necessary separation between church and state. With chairman Lt. Gov Dan Patrick calling it the "biggest lie" in America's history.; Federal Judge Darrin Gayles dismissed President Trump's $10 billion defamation lawsuit against Rupert Murdoch and the Wall Street Journal in connection with their reporting about Trump's relationship with Jeffrey Epstein.; After being questioned about his comments against Pope Leo, President Trump stated that he would not apologize for his comments and that the Pope was weak on crime.; While speaking with Fox News, Vice President Vance stated that the Vatican should "stick to matters of morality" and let the president "stick to dictating American public policy".; President Trump received a McDonald's DoorDash delivery by dasher Sharon Simmons at the Oval Office, as a promotional stunt highlighting his No Tax on Tips policy. Simmons, a resident of Arkansas, had previously lobbied Congress in July 2025 for the policy.; President Trump meets with King Willem-Alexander and Queen Máxima of the Netherlands at the White House.; A Florida judge throws out Trump's lawsuit against the Wall Street Journal alleging defamation after the Journal published details of a birthday message featuring a drawing of naked woman that Trump allegedly sent to Jeffrey Epstein.; Settling a lawsuit, the Trump administration agrees to fly the LGBTQ+ rainbow flag at Stonewall National Monument.	DoorDash driver Sharon Simmons delivering McDonald's to President Trump President and First Lady Trump with Dutch King Willem-Alexander and Queen Máxima at the White House
Tuesday April 14	The DC Circuit Court of Appeals ordered US District Judge James Boasberg to end his efforts to hold the administration accountable for flouting his orders about deportation flights.	
Wednesday April 15	House Democrat Yassamin Ansari filed six articles of impeachment against Secretary of Defense Pete Hegseth in relation to the Iran war, deadly strikes on suspected drug smuggling boats and sharing classified information on Signal.; During a prayer session, Defense Secretary Pete Hegseth apparently read a fake Bible quote from Pulp Fiction while speaking about the rescue of a downed pilot in Iran.; The White House highlighted President Trump's new tax policies on Tax Day, with Press Secretary Karoline Leavitt alleging that the average refund was more than $3,400. Leavitt was joined by Treasury Secretary Scott Bessent and Small Business Administration Administrator Kelly Loeffler.	
Thursday April 16	Defense Secretary Pete Hegseth and Chairman of the Joint Chiefs of Staff Gen Dan Caine held a joint news conference, to discuss the Iran War and the Strait of Hormuz crisis. Both men stated that if any ships do not comply with the blockade the US military would respond with force.; Health and Human Services Secretary Robert Kennedy Jr testifies before the House over the department's responses and budget.; Acting Immigration and Customs Enforcement director Todd Lyons submitted his resignation, stating he wished to spend more time with his family.; Big Bend residents and national environment group sued the Trump administration alleging that they illegally bypassed federal environmental laws for the border wall.; Via Truth Social President Trump announced the nomination of Dr. Erica Schwartz as the next director of the Centers for Disease Control and Prevention. He also nominated Sean Slovenski, as the CDC deputy director and chief operating officer, Jennifer Shuford as deputy director and chief medical officer, and Dr. Sara Brenner as senior counselor for public health to the health secretary.	
Friday April 17	The House voted unanimously to continue Section 702 of the Foreign Intelligence Surveillance Act (FISA) until April 30.	
Saturday April 18	The Trump administration removes the federal information websites for Covid.gov and Covidtests.gov and redirects the domains to a new page fully endorsing the highly controversial COVID-19 lab leak theory. The new page contains notable omissions and several scientific inaccuracies.; President Trump signs an executive order to allow for more research into the use of psychedelics as treatment for certain mental illnesses.	
Sunday April 19	The US Navy and Marines seizes the Iran linked merchant ship M/V Touska as it appeared to defy the US blockade of Iranian ports.	
Monday April 20	FBI Director Kash Patel filed a lawsuit seeking $250 million in damages from the Atlantic magazine over an article alleging that Patel was a chronic drinker and had frequent absences from work.; The US Customs and Border Protection debuted a portal to allow for companies to submit tariff refund claims, in response to the Supreme Court ruling months prior.; Labor Secretary Lori Chavez-DeRemer announced her resignation following misconduct probes into her and the department under her leadership.; Vice President Vance and his delegation traveled to Pakistan as part of another round of ceasefire talks with Iran in Islamabad.	
Tuesday April 21	President Trump announced an extension of a ceasefire with Iran, acting at the request of Pakistani mediators while waiting for a "unified proposal" from Iranian leaders regarding the ongoing conflict.	
Wednesday April 22	Navy Secretary John Phelan was removed from his position due to reported infighting with Defense Secretary Pete Hegseth and others, as well as internal disputes about shipbuilding.	
Thursday April 23	The US Justice Department charged a US special forces soldier who was a part of the raid to capture Venezuelan President Nicolas Maduro, with using classified information to win more than $400,000 on online betting platform Polymarket.; Chief Science and Technology Advisor Michael Kratsios vowed to crack down on foreign tech companies exploitation of US AI models.; The US Drug Enforcement Administration reclassified state-licensed medial marijuana and other products under the Controlled Substances Act.	President Trump participates in a health care affordability event.
Friday April 24	President Trump, in a statement released on Armenian Remembrance Day, used the term "Medz Yeghern" (great catastrophe) instead of genocide.; The US Justice Department dropped its criminal investigation of Federal Reserve Chair Jerome Powell.; Acting Attorney General Todd Blanche released a report suggested using firing squads, electrocution, and gas asphyxiation as methods of executing people, citing shortages of lethal injections.; The White House announced a 90-day extension of the Jones Act waiver, in an effort to lower fuel prices during the ongoing Iran war.; Members of the independent National Science Board that oversees the National Science Foundation were fired by the Presidential Personnel Office on behalf of President Trump.; New York Attorney General Letitia James and Gov Kathy Hochul sued the Trump administration over canceled highway funding, after the Department of Transportation stated they would withhold funding over a driver's license status change.; The District of Columbia Court of Appeals struck down the closing of US borders to asylum-seekers by the Trump administration, stating it violated the Immigration and Nationality Act.; Press Secretary Karoline Leavitt announced the start of her maternity leave, for her second child with husband Nicholas Riccio. There has been no official replacement announced for Leavitt at the time of her announcement.	
Saturday April 25	President Trump attends the 2026 White House Correspondents' Dinner and is evacuated after a reported shooting incident.	President Trump addresses the press two hours after the shooting.
Sunday April 26	President Trump is interviewed by Norah O'Donnell for a segment on 60 Minutes regarding the shooting at the White House Correspondents' Dinner. The segment aired on that night's edition of the program.	
Monday April 27	King Charles III of the United Kingdom, accompanied by Queen Camilla, begins a four-day state visit, the first during the second Trump presidency.; First Lady Melania Trump accused talk show host Jimmy Kimmel of "hateful and violent rhetoric" following Kimmel's joke on April 23 and the Correspondents' dinner shooting. Kimmel had described Trump as "an expectant widow".; Workers began renovation work on the Lincoln Memorial Reflecting pool, after draining it and appearing to paint the bottom with blue paint. President Trump stated that the work would be done by his best "pool builders" to fix its joints and resurface it with industrial grade material in American flag blue.; Katie Phang files a federal lawsuit against Todd Blanche accusing him of failing to comply with the Epstein Files Transparency Act by withholding documents and making improper redactions.	
Tuesday April 28	Multiple raids were conducted in Minnesota by federal law enforcement agencies on suspicion of alleged welfare fraud.; President Trump and First Lady Melania Trump host their first state dinner for his second presidency in honor of King Charles III and Queen Camilla.; The Federal Communications Commissions (FCC) announced the review of eight local broadcasting licenses used by ABC in a potential retaliatory action following a joke by Jimmy Kimmel.; US District Judge Susan Brnovich found that Title III of the Civil Rights Act of 1960 does not grant the Justice Department the power to demand Arizona turn over its voter registration lists.; Former FBI Director James Comey is indicted by a grand jury for allegedly making threats against the president. The threats are alleged to be in the form of an image Comey posted to Instagram that showed seashells arranged to form the numbers "86 47".	President Trump and First Lady Melania Trump with King Charles III and Queen Camilla
Wednesday April 29	The Supreme Court ruled that Louisiana's 2024 election map was an unconstitutional racial gerrymander narrowing Section 2 in the Voting Rights Act.; Defense Secretary Pete Hegseth and chairman of the Joint Chiefs of Staff Dan Caine testified in front of the House Armed Services Committee about the Pentagons budget, Iran war and other aspects.; President Trump hosted the Artemis II crew at the White House to celebrate their achievements, along with NASA Administrator Jared Isaacman. The meeting took place while the administration sought to cut make cuts to some of NASA's budget to increase space exploration missions.; The Department of Justice sued New Jersey over a state law that limits when law enforcement can hide their identities while interacting with the public, claiming the requirement of having officers identify themselves prior to detaining or arresting them improperly seeks to regulate the actions of federal officials.; Robert Cekada, was confirmed to lead the Bureau of Alcohol, Tobacco, Firearms and Explosives (ATF) the third leader in decades and the first without any Republican opposition.; During an oval office interview with ABC News reporter Terry Moran, Trump falsely insists that mistakenly deported legal resident Kilmar Abrego Garcia had the letters MS-13 tattooed on his knuckles, showing Moran an obviously altered photo with the alphanumeric letters MS-13 typed over tattoos of a leaf, a smiley face, a cross and a skull.	President Trump meets with the Artemis II crew in the Oval Office. Donald Trump posing with an altered photo of letters superimposed over Kilmar Garcia's knuckle tattoos.
Thursday April 30	The U.S. House of Representatives unanimously approves a Senate bill to fund the Department of Homeland Security,Secret Service, Coast Guard, FEMA, TSA, and Cybersecurity and Infrastructure Security Agency to end the 76-day government shutdown. President Trump signs the bill ending the shutdown.; The Department of Education released final regulations governing student loan repayment set to go into effect in July 2026.	

=== May 2026 ===
Date	Events	Photos/videos
Friday May 1	Spirit Airlines shuts down operations, citing high fuel costs stemming from the 2026 Iran War .; President Trump shared a series of AI images on Truth Social, including one showing himself, Vice President Vance, Interior Secretary Doug Burgum and State Secretary Marco Rubio shirtless and wearing bathing suits while lounging in the Lincoln Memorial Reflecting Pool.	The AI-generated image of President Trump, Vice President Vance, Interior Secretary Burgum and State Secretary Rubio lounging in the Lincoln Memorial Reflecting Pool.
Saturday May 2	President Trump visited his local dentist in Florida, prompting speculation about his health. The White House alleged the visit was scheduled and routine, however it was not listed on his public schedule.	
Sunday May 3		
Monday May 4	President Trump announced that the United States would "guide" stranded ships through the Strait of Hormuz, and declared it to be called "Project Freedom".; It was reported that Defense Secretary Pete Hegseth had begun bringing his wife, former Fox News producer Jennifer Rauchet to meetings with Pentagon staffers and had expressed fear and paranoia about being fired by President Trump.; A man carrying a gun was confronted by Secret Service agents near Independence Ave and 15St SW, near the Washington Monument after Vice President Vance's motorcade passed through the area. The suspect and a bystander were shot after the suspect allegedly opened fire.; The Department of Educations Office of Civil Rights announced a Title IX investigation into Smith College, a historically women's college for allegedly violating federal law by admitting transgender women.	President Trump participates in a small business summit.
Tuesday May 5	President Trump announces pause on "Project Freedom", that had begun the day before.; U.S. Secretary of State Marco Rubio announces that Operation Epic Fury has concluded, with the US shifting focus to a more defensive position and restoring commercial passage through the Strait of Hormuz.; While speaking with conservative radio talk show host Hugh Hewitt President Trump raised claims that Pope Leo would approve of Iran having a nuclear program and would endanger Catholics and other people.; Vice President Vance spoke at a manufacturing facility in Des Moines, Iowa to help campaign for Representative Zach Nunn where there were a series of gaffs by Vance on stage.	Vice President Vance delivers remarks in Des Moines, Iowa. Secretary of State Rubio briefs members of the media.
Wednesday May 6	Prices of oil plunged and markets surged after a report was issued that the US believed a ceasefire to end the Iran war and reopening of the Strait of Hormuz was imminent. Shortly before the announcement, the average retail US gas price was reported at $4.50 per gallon.; The FBI searched the office of Virginia State Senator L Louise Lucas, allegedly in connection with a bribery scheme connected to a marijuana dispensary business. Lucas was a key figure in the new Virginia congressional map that added four Democratic leaning seats.; The Justice Department sued Colorado in an attempt to strike down a 13-year state ban on large-capacity firearm ammunition magazines. The ban had been enacted following the Aurora movie theater shooting.; A gold statue depicting President Trump raising his fist was installed and dedicated at the Trump National Doral Miami golf course as "Don Colossus" with the ceremony presided over by Pastor Mark Burns, Trump's spiritual advisor.; In a closed door interview, the House Oversight Committee grilled commerce secretary Howard Lutnik for several hours over his ties to Jeffrey Epstein.	
Thursday May 7	Secretary of State Marco Rubio met with Pope Leo at the Vatican to discuss the situation in the Middle East and additional matters.; The Trump administration classified left-wing networks such as Antifa, among three major types of terror groups, claiming the groups are violent secular political groups with anti-American, radically pro-transgender and anarchist.; President Trump holds a bilateral meeting with with Brazilian President Luiz Inácio Lula da Silva at the White House to discuss economic and security concerns.; The construction operations and facilities manager in the White House Office of Administration spoke with the National Capital Planning Commission about President Trump's plan to paint the gray granite exterior of the Eisenhower Executive Office Building with white paint.; President Trump was driven across the new coating of the Lincoln Memorial Reflecting Pool before he exited his motorcade, made a statement and took questions from reporters in an unannounced trip.; The Trump administration sued in the federal court of New Mexico against the diocese of Las Cruces, New Mexico to seize 14 acres of land at Mount Cristo Rey, to install more boarder barriers.	President Trump and Brazilian Luíz Inácio Lula da Silva.
Friday May 8	Vice President Vance met with Qatari Prime Minister Sheikh Mohammed bin Abdulrahman bin Jassim Al-Thani to discuss a range of topics including the Iran war.; The Pentagon released a major spread of documents and files about UFO's in a sweep of declassifications, along with a website where users can review the released files.; The US military announced that its forces had disabled two Iranian tankers that had attempted to breach the US blockage of Iranian ports from the Strait of Hormuz. Despite the attacks, the US holds that the ceasefire is still in effect.; The CDC issued a Health Alert Network health advisory on hantavirus, alerting clinicians to be aware of potentially imported cases in connection from the MV Hondius cruise ship outbreak.; The average gas price in the United States was reported at $4.50, with prices jumping up by 50% following the start of the Iran war.; Transportation Secretary Sean Duffy announced the upcoming release of "The Great American Road Trip", a five-part reality series to celebrate the US 250th anniversary and highlight the nation. Joining Duffy was his wife, Rachel Campos-Duffy and their nine children, was sponsored by companies that intersect with the department's oversight raising ethics concerns.	
Saturday May 9		
Sunday May 10	The alleged drinking concerns about Supreme Court Justice Brett Kavanaugh, Defense Secretary Pete Hegseth, and FBI director Kash Patel, were highlighted in the cold open for Saturday Night Live.; Defense Secretary Pete Hegseth, announced that he would review whether Senator Mark Kelly potentially improperly disclosed classified information during a CSB Face the Nation morning show. Kelly discussed recent open-door Pentagon briefings to Congress in connection with the Iran war.	
Monday May 11	While speaking with reporters, President Trump announced his intention of suspending the Federal Gas Tax, which requires an act of Congress. Following his statement, Senator Josh Hawley announced his intent to introduce legislation suspending the tax.; Seventeen American passengers who were aboard the MV Hondius and exposed during the hantavirus outbreak on board, were repatriated back to the US and transported to the National Quarantine Unit in at the University of Nebraska Medical Center. At least two passengers were either showing symptoms or had tested positive.; Supreme Court Justice Samuel Alito extended an order to maintain full access to the abortion pill, mifepristone, as the court continues to review the case related to the drug's availability. The order is set to expire the evening of May 14.; Health Secretary Robert F Kennedy Jr fired two leaders; Dr John Wong and Dr Esa Davis, from the US Preventive Services Task Force.	
Tuesday May 12	Food and Drug Administration commissioner Marty Makary resigned and Kyle Diamantas was named as commissioner in acting capacity.; FBI director Kash Patel testified to a Senate hearing regarding excessive drinking and unexplained absences from his job.	President Trump gaggles with the press before departing the White House. FBI director Kash Patel testified to a Senate hearing regarding excessive drinking and unexplained absences from his job.
Wednesday May 13	Vice President Vance and Administrator Mehmet Oz hold a press conference on anti-fraud initiatives. During the conference Vance stated the administration was withholding $1.3 billion in Medicaid payment to California and threatened to withhold payments from other states alleging fraud and the need for prosecuting fraud by the states.	Vice President Vance and Administrator Oz hold a press conference on anti-fraud initiatives.
Thursday May 14	President Trump made a state visit to China and met with Xi Jinping, the General Secretary of the Chinese Communist Party.; The Supreme Court ruled that patients can continue to access the medical abortion pill mifepristone in Danco Laboratories LLC v Louisiana et al.; Vice President Vance spoke to supporters at Bangor International Airport in Maine where he discussed high cost of living and alleged fraud in Maine. Some were turned away at the door, alleging that they were denied entry over disagreeing with Vance's opinions.; Two financial disclosure forms for President Trump were released by the US Office of Government Ethics, showing at least $220 million in financial transactions over the first three months of 2026.; It was reported by AP news that FBI director Kash Patel and members of his group were given a "VIP snorkel tour" around the USS Arizona memorial at Pearl Harbor. The FBI did not disclose the session, and lead to criticisms about blurring professional responsibilities and leisure.; The Transportation Security Administration announced the release introduced TSA Gold+ a new public-private partnership to expand the current Screening Partnership Program.	President Trump visits the Temple of Heaven with Chinese leader Xi Jinping. President Trump participates in a state banquet with Chinese leader Xi Jinping. Vice President Vance delivers remarks in Bangor, Maine.
Friday May 15	Vice President Vance delivers remarks at the National Peace Officers' Memorial Service.; On the final day in China, Trump visited Zhongnanhai and then departed on Air Force One.	Vice President Vance delivers remarks at the National Peace Officers' Memorial Service. President Trump gaggles with the press before departing the White House.
Saturday May 16		
Sunday May 17		
Monday May 18	President Trump, sons Eric and Donald Jr, and the Trump organization announced the dismissal of their $10 billion lawsuit against the IRS. In response the Justice Department will create a $1.8 billion fund for those who allege to have suffered "lawfare". Democrats raised concerns about the fund being used as a slush fund for Trump and his supporters.; President Trump announces that he has called off planned military strikes against Iran for tomorrow at the request of Middle East allies including Qatar Emir Tamim bin Hamad Al Thani, Saudi Arabian Crown Prince Mohammed bin Salman, and UAE President Mohamed bin Zayed Al Nahyan, citing "serious negotiations" taking place.; The Justice Department announced the dismissal of criminal fraud charges against Indian billionaire Gautam Adani, as well as settle alleged Iran sanction violations regarding his companies. This happened after Adani's lawyer, who is also a personal attorney of Trump, announced his intent to invest $10 billion into the United States.; Minnesota county prosecutor announced charges against Christian Castro, an ICE agent accused of assault and falsely reporting a crime in connection with a nonfatal shooting of a Venezuelan man in January 2026.; Following a medal ceremony at Fort Campbell, Defense Secretary Pete Hegseth campaigned for candidate Ed Gallrein. Hegseth's actions were seen as unusual as the position normally avoids overt political posturing and could violate the Hatch Act.; The New York Times files a second lawsuit against the administration's Department of Defense, this time arguing that a new policy requiring journalists to always be accompanied by official escorts inside the Pentagon is unconstitutional.	President Trump participates in a healthcare affordability event.
Tuesday May 19	In terms added to the settlement of President Trump, his sons and the Trump organization against the IRS, the IRS cannot bring claims against Trump, his family or businesses for past tax issues.; President Trump spoke to reporters about the planned White House ballroom at its construction site, and defended the project while criticizing the debate about funding for the project.; President Trump and First Lady Melania Trump host the second Congressional Picnic on the White House South Lawn since his second presidency began.	Order barring the Internal Revenue Service from investigating President Trump and his family. President Trump visits ballroom construction. President Trump and First Lady Melania Trump at the 2026 Congressional Picnic
Wednesday May 20	Two police officers who defended the capitol during the January 6, 2021 attack; Harry Dunn and Daniel Hodges sued the Trump administration to attempt to block the creation of $1.8 billion fund that is to be created following dismissal of Trump's lawsuit against the IRS.; US Attorney General Todd Blanche announced the indictment of former Cuban president Raúl Castro in connection with the downing of two planes in 1996.; US District Judge John Bates, ordered aides to President Trump to continue to observe the requirements of the Presidential Records Act, nullifying the opinion issued by the Justice Department Office of Legal Counsel the month earlier. The office had claimed the law unconstitutionally intrudes on presidential power.; President Trump demanded the firing of Senate parliamentarian, Elizabeth MacDonough, after she ruled against funding for the White House ballroom.; Senate Majority Leader John Thune announced at a GOP lunch meeting that Senate Republicans would remove a $1 billion Secret Service funding request that was slated for President Trump's ballroom.	Vice President Vance briefs members of the media.
Thursday May 21	The US Commission of Fine Arts approved the design for the triumphal arch that President Trump had designed for the entrance of the capitol.	
Friday May 22	A federal judge dismissed all charges in the case of Kilmar Abrego Garcia for reasons of selective of vindictive prosecution. "The evidence before this court sadly reflects an abuse of prosecuting power," wrote Judge Waverly Crenshaw.; President Trump posted his congratulations of the wedding of his son Donald Jr and Bettina Anderson stating that he would not attend the ceremony due to governmental circumstances and his love for the country. It was later reported that Trump, First Lady Trump and Barron Trump all did not attend the Bahamas based wedding.; The University of Michigan Consumer Sentiment Index falls to an all-time record low of 44.8.; On May 22, 2026, immigrants detained in Delaney Hall, a Newark, New Jersey private prison run by GEO Group used for holding immigrants detained by Immigration and Customs Enforcement (ICE), held a month-long hunger and labor strike protesting conditions inside the facility. Protests supporting the strikers from outside the facility escalated, where over 90 arrests were made. Detainees have been given expired food with worms or mold, sleep on the floor in overcrowded rooms, have been denied medical care for serious conditions, and have reportedly been abused by guards.; Further information: 2026 Delaney Hall hunger strike and protests	Riot police outside Delaney Hall, shortly before making mass arrests against protesters and journalists. President Trump delivers remarks.
Saturday May 23	Tulsi Gabbard announces that she will resign as Director of National Intelligence, citing her husband's diagnosis with a rare form of bone cancer.; The White House was placed on lockdown following reports of shots fired near 17th St and Pennsylvania Avenue NW. Secret Service engaged with the suspect and evacuated gathered reporters from the North Lawn into the press briefing room. At least two people including the suspect were wounded.; Defense Secretary Pete Hegseth spoke at the West Point commencement ceremony and dedicated much of his speech to denouncing prior diversity, equity and inclusion efforts.	
Sunday May 24		
Monday May 25	President Trump performs a wreath-laying ceremony at the Tomb of the Unknown Soldier at the Arlington National Cemetery and delivers the Memorial Day address at the Memorial Amphitheater.; Construction reportedly began on the UFC Freedom 250 fight arena and stands for about 5,000 spectators on the White House south lawn.	President Trump, Vice President Vance and Secretary Hegseth at Arlington National Cemetery
Tuesday May 26	Vice President Vance, Federal Trade Commission Chair Andrew Ferguson, White House senior advisor Stephen Miller and state attorneys general held an anti-fraud initiative roundtable and spoke with the press.; President Trump had made an hours long visit to Walter Reed National Military Medical Center, his third visit within a year, sparking concerns about his health. Trump took, and passed, what he claims is his fourth Montreal Cognitive Assessment test, which screens for cognitive impairment and early-stage dementia.	
Wednesday May 27	US Secretary of State Marco Rubio stated during a cabinet meeting that the United States will not allow any cases of Ebola to enter the US. The US will instead create a facility in Kenya for Americans exposed to the Ebola virus.; President Trump and Freedom 250 announced an initial set of artists to perform at the Great American State Fair in Washington D.C. Shortly after the announcement many of the artists announced, publicly backed out of the concert, alleging misrepresentation of the event prior to the booking.	
Thursday May 28	The Justice Department opened a criminal investigation into whether E. Jean Carroll committed perjury in testimony during her lawsuits regarding sexual abuse allegations against President Trump. Carroll was awarded damages after a jury found Trump liable for sexual abuse and in a defamation case.; Vice President Vance spoke at the US Air Force Academy's 2026 commencement ceremony.	Treasury Secretary Bessent briefs members of the media.
Friday May 29	It was reported that a Pentagon memo was posted to Facebook, stating height and weight requirements for service members looking to attend the UFC Freedom 250 fight, with a cutoff waist-to-height ratio of less than 0.55.	
Saturday May 30		
Sunday May 31	After the majority of artists booked to perform at the Freedom 250 celebration cancelled, Trump announces the musical performances will be called off and replaced with a rally he will host.	

=== June 2026 ===
Date	Events	Photos/videos
Monday June 1	President Trump has a heated telephone conversation with Israeli prime minister Benjamin Netanyahu. In the call, Trump reportedly called Netanyahu "fucking crazy," and also reportedly said "You'd be in prison if it weren't for me. I'm saving your ass. Everybody hates you now. Everybody hates Israel because of this."	
Tuesday June 2	The Justice Department announced their intent to scrap the "anti-weaponization" fund that was to be created as a settlement provision for the Trump v IRS lawsuit. The provision protecting Trump and his family from tax audits would still stand according to US Attorney General Todd Blanche, which sparked condemnation across the aisle.; Seven states sued the Trump administration over the decision to cancel a major offshore windfarm lease off the coast of New York, resulting in a $1 billion payment to French energy firm TotalEnergies.; Journalist Aaron Rupar tweeted that Trump had made no public appearances since May 27 when he had attended a Cabinet meeting with a pre-recorded interview being released during that time. White House spokesperson Davis Ingle refuted concerns about Trump's health, stating the president had completed multiple engagements with open press slots for the end of the week, and labeled the concerns as "left-wing conspiracies".	
Wednesday June 3		
Thursday June 4	It was reported that the Pentagon has appointed a rioter convicted of a misdemeanor in relation to his participation in the January 6 attacks, to a position in the Department of Defense's special operations and low intensity conflict office. This appointment has caused concerns about his young age and participation in the riots, compared to his role in the DoD.; The Department of Interior announced the regilding of four gold-plated Arts of War and Arts of Peace equestrian statutes near the Lincoln Memorial. The statues had been gifted to the United States by Italy about 75 years ago.; The House passed bipartisan legislation, that would provide new aid to Ukraine and impose sanctions on Russia in response to the ongoing Ukrainian Russian war.	
Friday June 5	During a Meet the Press interview with Kristen Welker, President Trump defended his administration's "anti-weaponization fund" and did not rule out the government paying January 6 rioters. He raised unsubstantial comments that the recent Californian elections were rigged, prompting an argument between him and Welker, which resulted in Trump ending the interview abruptly.; President Trump announced that he would attend the Game 3 of the NBA Finals between the New York Knicks and San Antonio Spurs at Madison Square Garden in New York City. Knicks owner James Dolan, a personal friend of Trump, invited him to sit with him in his suite.	President Trump during a Meet the Press interview with Kristen Welker
Saturday June 6	British deputy Prime Minister David Lammy and Vice President Vance held a telephone call, where Lammy told Vance that he was incorrect in blaming immigration for the recent murder of Henry Nowak in Southampton.; Defense Secretary Pete Hegseth gave a speech at the Normandy American Cemetery for the 82nd Anniversary of D-Day. While commemorating the soldiers and military action of D-Day, Hegseth also criticized Europe over its immigration policies and that an immigration invasion was occurring. His comments were condemned by multiple individuals and field experts.; A lawsuit was filed by Public Integrity Project against the UFC 250 fight alleging the fight and use of White House grounds would financially benefit President Trump and UFC president Dana White. Additionally the suit claims the structure was not authorized by congress or environmental review.	
Sunday June 7		
Monday June 8	Crew members of an AH-34 Apache helicopter were rescued near the Strait of Hormuz, after the helicopter crashed into the sea. The US military Central Command opened up an investigation into the incident the next day.; While attending Game 3 of the NBA finals at Madison Square Garden, President Trump was loudly booed and jeered at when he was shown on the jumbotron during the national anthem. His motorcade was also protested and booed at, as it made its way to the stadium earlier. During the game Trump was recorded appearing to sleep through large portions of the game, causing critics to express outrage on social media.; While speaking on a Louisiana radio station House Speaker Mike Johnson blamed "autopilot spending" in the form of entitlement programs like Medicare, Medicaid and Social Security for ballooning entitlement spending, and suggested that they needed review and adjustments.; Vice President Vance announced that he was referring Minnesota Governor Tim Walz and state Attorney General Keith Ellison, to the Justice Department for a criminal fraud investigation involving social services programs.	
Tuesday June 9	The House of Representatives passes a $70 billion budget reconciliation package to fund Immigration and Customs Enforcement (ICE) and Border Patrol for the rest of Trump's presidency by a vote of 214-212.; The Trump Organization began selling "Freedom 250" themed silver and gold coins branded with President Trump's face and his signature, to promote the UFC Freedom 250 fight set to take place later in the week.	
Wednesday June 10	The United States struck multiple targets in Iran, following comments by President Trump who promised that the US would strike Iran "hard again today" while pressing Iran to sign a deal and end the war.; House Speaker Mike Johnson pushed back on reports that President Trump had responded with "I love the inflation" when questioned about the annual rate of inflation jumping to 4.2% in May. Johnson claimed Trump's comments had been taken out of context.; President Trump asked Congress to pass a "short term" extension of FISA to allow for the selection and confirmation of a permanent acting director of national intelligence, who would replace temporary acting Intelligence Director Bill Pulte.; President Trump signs the Secure America Act to fund Immigration and Customs Enforcement (ICE) and Border Patrol with $70 billion for the rest of his term.; Multiple plaintiffs sue the Department of Interior over the departments plan to cede 725 acres of land from the Lower Rio Grande National Wildlife Refuge to SpaceX in Boca Chica, Texas in exchange for 692 acres SpaceX owns in the Laguna Atascosa National Wildlife Refuge.	President Trump signs the Secure America Act in the Oval Office.
Thursday June 11		
Friday June 12		
Saturday June 13	Workers removed President Trump's name from the exterior of the Kennedy Center, hours past the court-ordered deadline that had been extended.; The U.S. House of Representatives passes the 21st Century ROAD to Housing Act in a effort to lower the cost-of-living of houses and support affordable housing in the country.	A crowd watching as workers build scaffolding to remove Donald Trump's name from the Kennedy Center.
Sunday June 14	President Trump announces he has reached a preliminary deal to end the 2026 Iran war.; President Trump celebrates his 80th birthday. He is the second President to reach 80 years of age while still in office, after his second-term predecessor Joe Biden in November 2022.; President Trump hosts the UFC Freedom 250 on the South Lawn of the White House.; Senator Mitch McConnell was hospitalized following emergency services being called to his home. Released EMS and dispatcher audio referenced "cardiac arrest" and "CPR" for an unidentified unconscious person.	
Monday June 15	President Trump attends the 52nd G7 summit with world leaders of G7 in Évian-les-Bains, France.; President Trump holds a bilateral meeting with French President Emmanuel Macron.	President Trump and French President Emmanuel Macron
Tuesday June 16	President Trump holds bilateral meetings with Emir Tamim bin Hamad Al Thani of Qatar and President Mohamed bin Zayed Al Nahyan of United Arab Emirates.; The Department of Education announced that the Department of Justice will take over civil rights enforcement in schools, and the Department of Health and Human Services will oversee special education.	President Trump and Emir Tamim bin Hamad Al Thani of Qatar President Trump and President Mohamed bin Zayed Al Nahyan of United Arab Emirates President Trump and other world leaders at the 52nd G7 summit
Wednesday June 17	President Trump holds bilateral meetings with Egyptian President Abdel Fattah el-Sisi and Indian Prime Minister Narendra Modi.; President Trump attends a dinner with French President Emmanuel Macron at the Palace of Versailles.; President Trump and Iranian President Masoud Pezeshkian sign the initial deal to end the Iran War.	President Trump and Egyptian President Abdel Fattah el-Sisi President Trump and Indian Prime Minister Narendra Modi President Trump and Iranian President Masoud Pezeshkian sign the initial deal to end the Iran War
Thursday June 18	Vice President Vance briefs members of the media.	Vice President Vance briefs members of the media.
Friday June 19	President Trump unveils the new interim Air Force One plane, Boeing VC-25B Bridge, at the Joint Base Andrews in Maryland, the plane had been gifted from the royal family of Qatar.	President Trump speaks in front of new Air Force One plane.
Saturday June 20	President Trump posted to Truth Social a photo of an unknown blonde woman and the caption of “Great daughter. My Honor!!! President DJT.” sparking widespread confusion.	
Sunday June 21	President Trump issues a threat to invade Iran, following Iran's claim of its closure due to Israeli strikes in Lebanon. Trump suggested a potential threat against Iranian negotiators in Switzerland.; President Trump claimed that the New York Times was treasonous in a late night post on Truth Social following an article where the paper was critical about the Iran war.	
Monday June 22	President Trump announced that he would release proof of vandals supposedly cutting a massive slit in the Lincoln Memorial Reflecting pool following a $14.7 million renovation project that is now peeling and covered in algae.; President Trump threatened a lawsuit against ABC News for reporting on the cost of repairing damage sustained to the Lincoln Memorial Reflecting Pool. Trump further claimed, with no evidence, that his predecessors, former presidents Obama and Biden, had spent over $100 million on repairs to the pool.	
Tuesday June 23	The Supreme Court ruled that a devout Rastafarian man could not seek damages under the Religious Land Use and Institutionalized Persons Act after his dreadlocks were shaved off in prison, despite his claim of religious freedoms being violated.; The Supreme Court sided with the Trump administration over the governments power over green card holders accused of crimes.; According to The Heritage Foundation, the Trump administration has implemented 53% of the policy proposals in its plan, Project 2025 – which Trump denied knowing anything about while running for office in 2024.	
Wednesday June 24	President Trump holds a bilateral meeting with NATO Secretary General Mark Rutte at the White House.; After a number of musical guest backed out President Trump opened the Great American State Fair with a speech on the National Mall.	President Trump and NATO Secretary General Mark Rutte
Thursday June 25	Vice President Vance visits the Richard Nixon Presidential Library and Museum to deliver remarks. Vance compared himself to former President Nixon, and minimized the Watergate scandal during his remarks.	Vice President Vance visits the Richard Nixon Presidential Library and Museum to deliver remarks.
Friday June 26		
Saturday June 27		
Sunday June 28		
Monday June 29	The Supreme Court rejected President Trump's attempt at firing Federal Reserve board member Lisa Cook. In a separate ruling the court overturned the 1935 ruling in Humphry's Executor v United States allowing him to remove Rebecca Kelly Slaughter from the Federal Trade Commission.; The Supreme Court rejected taking up an appeal from President Trump over the $5 million verdict and finding that he sexually abused and defamed E. Jean Carroll.; The Supreme Court ruled that election officials may count mail-in-ballots that arrive after Election Day if they were postmarked prior to Election Day, rejecting a RNC challenge.	
Tuesday June 30	The Supreme Court upheld state laws banning transgender athletes from participating in girls and women's sports, with the majority ruling that such laws do not violate either the Fourteenth Amendment or Title IX.; The Supreme Court upheld that the Fourteenth Amendment extended the promise of citizenship "to every free-born person in this land" upholding the broad concept of birthright citizenship.; The Supreme Court struck down campaign finance rules challenged by Vice President Vance that limited how much a national political party committee can spend on individual candidates. The court found that the restrictions violated free speech rights under the First Amendment.; President Trump released a personal financial disclosure which showed he made over $1 billion in cryptocurrency ventures, along with more than 21,000 stock trades executed on his behalf in 2025.; A federal judge rules for the New York Times, issuing a preliminary injunction blocking a new policy requiring journalists to be accompanied by an official escort while in the Pentagon.	

== See also ==
- First 100 days of the second Trump presidency – Period from January to April 2025
- List of executive actions by Donald Trump
- Lists of presidential trips made by Donald Trump (international trips)
- Second presidential transition of Donald Trump – Transfer of presidential power from Joe Biden to Donald Trump
- Timeline of the 2024 United States presidential election

U.S. presidential administration timelines
Preceded by Second Trump presidency (2026 Q1)	Second Trump presidency (2026 Q1)	Succeeded by Second Trump presidency (2026 Q3)
