= Mark Joseph Stern =

American journalist (born 1991)

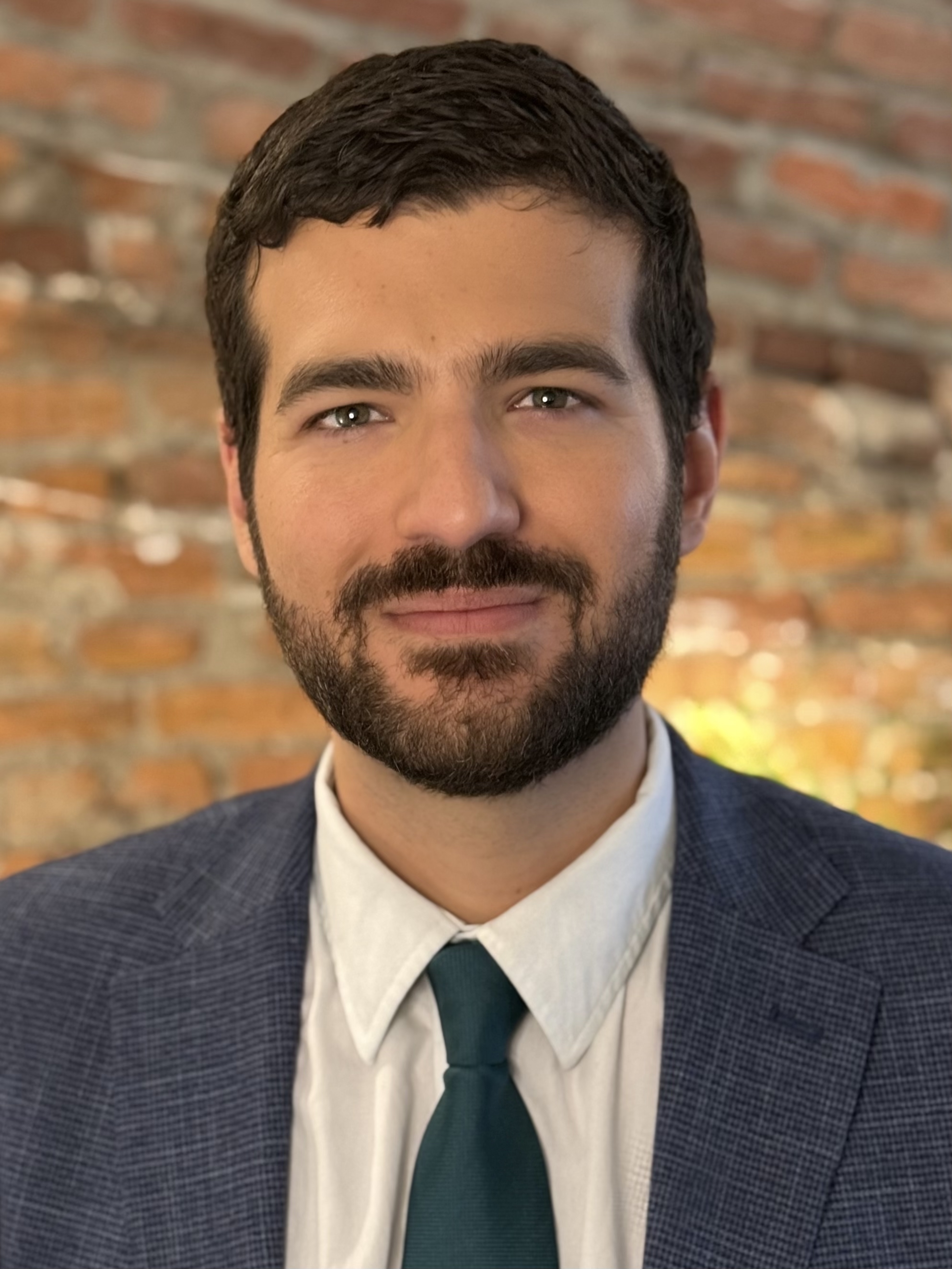
- Stern in 2025
- Born: 1991 (age 34–35); Tallahassee, Florida, U.S.
- Education: Georgetown University (BA, JD)
- Occupations: Author, political commentator, journalist
- Movement: Progressivism in the US
- Website: Personal website

Mark Joseph Stern (born 1991) is an American journalist and commentator. He is a senior writer covering courts and the law, especially the Supreme Court, for Slate.

He frequently appears on television, especially on MS NOW, and in podcasts, commenting on legal and social issues. In addition to the Supreme Court, his areas of expertise include LGBTQ+ equality, reproductive rights, U.S. territorial law and criminal justice.

He has co-authored law review articles about free speech, gay rights, and transgender equality.

== Education and career ==
Stern received a B.A. in history and art history from Georgetown University in 2013 and obtained a J.D. from Georgetown University Law Center in 2016. In 2016 he was admitted to the Maryland Bar.

He began working as an intern for Slate in August 2012 and continued there while attending law school at Georgetown. He became a full-time contributor and staff writer in 2016, and in February 2022, he was promoted to his current position as senior writer.

At Slate he covers the U.S. Supreme Court, federal appellate and district courts, and state and local courts. He has published articles in The Wall Street Journal, The Week, and The American Prospect.

Stern regularly speaks at universities, law schools, law firms, businesses, bar associations, and other non-profits. He has appeared on NPR and his frequent appearances on television include Alex Wagner Tonight, All In with Chris Hayes, The Katie Phang Show, The 11th Hour with Stephanie Ruhle, Katy Tur Reports, The Weekend with Jonathan Capeheart and Deadline: White House with Ali Velshi.

He co-hosts weekly bonus episodes of the podcast Amicus with Dahlia Lithwick for Slate Plus members. Other podcasts he has appeared on include The Bulwark Podcast with Tim Miller, The Majority Report with Sam Seder, The Michelangelo Signorile Show on Sirius XM , and How I Lawyer with Jonah Perlin.

== Personal life ==
Stern was born in Tallahassee, Florida in 1991. He is the son of former Florida State University College of Law professor Nat Stern with whom he sometimes co-authors. His grandfather was a Holocaust survivor.

Mark is Jewish and gay. He married his husband Tyler in 2018. They welcomed the birth of their first son in October 2023 and their second son in April 2026.

== Works ==
- American Justice 2019: The Roberts Courts Arrives. University of Pennsylvania Press, 2019. ISBN 9780812252132
