= Timeline of the second Trump presidency (2026 Q1) =

The following is a timeline of the second presidency of Donald Trump during the first quarter of 2026, from January 1, 2026, to March 31, 2026. To navigate between quarters, see timeline of the Donald Trump presidencies. For the Q2 timeline see timeline of the second Trump presidency (2026 Q2).

== Timeline ==
=== January 2026 ===
Date	Events	Photos/videos
Thursday January 1		
Friday January 2	President Trump signs an executive order saying that if Iran shoots and violently kills peaceful protesters, the United States of America will come to their rescue.	
Saturday January 3	President Trump orders airstrikes in Caracas, the capital of Venezuela, and the Venezuelan President Nicolás Maduro and the First Lady Cilia Flores are captured by American forces.	President Trump, State Secretary Marco Rubio, and CIA director John Ratcliffe during the attacks. President Trump addresses the airstrikes against Venezuela to the nation.
Sunday January 4	Trump reposts a false claim about the assassination of Minnesota Democratic state Rep. Melissa Hortman.; President Trump warns that Colombia President Gustavo Petro could face US action and appeared to make similar comments about Cuba.	
Monday January 5	A person is arrested on trespassing and vandalism charges, after attempting to damage Vice President Vance's home in Ohio.; The HHS (US Department of Health and Human Services) announces a reduction of vaccines recommended for every child in an overhaul of the childhood vaccine schedule, no longer recommending vaccines for RSV, hepatitis, rotavirus, dengue, covid-19, influenza, and meningococcal disease for all children.	
Tuesday January 6	President Trump ally Lindsey Halligan is ordered by a federal judge to explain her continued use of the title of the US Attorney General for the Eastern District of Virginia.; The Trump administration announces the pause in federal child care and family assistance funds to five Democratic states; California, Colorado, Illinois, Minnesota and New York.; Press Secretary Karoline Leavitt reaffirms President Trump's desire to acquire Greenland stating that it was a vital national security priority for the US.; The White House launches a website praising President Trump for his handling of the January 6 attack, blaming Democratic lawmakers for altering the narrative, and commending the pardoning of participants. The website's accounting of events contains "blatant falsehoods" according to the New York Times.	President Trump Delivers Remarks at the House GOP Member Retreat.
Wednesday January 7	The US military seizes an oil tanker, that had been sanctioned in 2024, off the coast of Iceland.; Minneapolis woman Renée Good is killed when an ICE agent shot her in the face.; Health Secretary Robert F. Kennedy Jr. and Agriculture Secretary Brooke Rollins announce new federal dietary guidelines.; President Trump announces that the United States 'shall withdraw' from the IPCC and 65 other international institutions.; President Trump requests reimbursement in more than $6 million in legal fees connected to the Georgia case about potentially interfering in 2020 presidential election.	
Thursday January 8	The US Senate advances a bipartisan resolution to block President Trump from using military force within or against Venezuela without prior approval from Congress.; When asked by the New York Times if any limits existed on his global powers, Trump replies "Yeah, there is one thing. My own morality. My own mind. It’s the only thing that can stop me."; Homeland Security secretary Kristi Noem orders new restrictions on congressional visits to immigration detention facilities, forcing them to seek a weeks advance of prior notice before conducting oversight visits.; Avelo Airlines cancels its contract with ICE, citing high costs and not enough benefits amid a political backlash.	
Friday January 9	Prosecutors in the DOJ’s civil rights division are told by leadership that they will not be investigating the killing of Reneé Good, even though it is customary for the division to take the lead in high-profile cases.; Secretary of Agriculture Brooke Rollins announces the suspension of federal benefit program funding to Minnesota over alleged fraud allegations.; A federal judge temporarily halts the Trump administration's plans to block federal child care and family assistance funds to five Democratic states.	
Saturday January 10	Representatives Ilhan Omar, Angie Craig and Kelly Morrision are denied entry to the Whipple federal building in Minneapolis, after updated restrictions by Homeland Security secretary Noem.	
Sunday January 11	The New York Times reports that in November of 2025, the U.S. attorney’s office in the DC opened a criminal investigation into Federal Reserve Chairman Jerome Powell.	
Monday January 12	Secretary of Defense Pete Hegseth announces the integration of Elon Musk's AI chatbot Grok into Pentagon networks.; Anthony Tata, the Pentagon's undersecretary for personnel and readiness issues a letter in response to queries from a coalition of lawmakers. The letter clarified that the military condemned any hazing or bullying, which appear to be counter to what DOD secretary Pete Hegseth had said earlier in September 2025.; Two aides in Labor Secretary Lori Chavez-DeRemer were placed on administrative leave after the Labor Department inspector general initiated an investigation over claims of inappropriate relationship between Chavez-DeRemer and a staffer and travel fraud by Chavez-DeRemer.	
Tuesday January 13	Six federal prosecutors in DOJ's Civil Rights Division resigned due to lack of action following the killing of Renée Good. Six more prosecutors resigned in Minnesota after instructions were given to investigate Good's widow instead of the shooter.; The Department of Health and Human Services announces large cuts to mental health and addiction programs. After widespread backlash the grant funding was restored the next day.; President Trump tours a Ford manufacturing plant in Dearborn, Michigan and spoke at Motorcity Casino in Detroit to promote US manufacturing and the US job market. While touring the factory President Trump was filmed cursing at and flipping off a worker who had referenced prior sexual assault allegations against Trump.; In a televised interview, President Trump threatens Iranian authorities with retaliatory action by the US military if they execute anti-government protestors.; DHS Secretary Kristi Noem announces the end of Temporary Protected Status for Somali nationals. Those with TPS will be ordered to leave the US by March 17 per DHS.; Senator Mark Kelly announces his lawsuit against DOD secretary Pete Hegseth, claiming that the Pentagon attempted to illegally demote him in retaliation of comments made by Kelly about the Trump administration.; Former secretary of state Hillary Clinton entered a sworn declaration to the House Oversight and Government Reform Committee denying any knowledge of the criminal activities of Jeffrey Epstein and Ghislaine Maxwell, and did not recall ever meeting Epstein.	
Wednesday January 14	A DHS spokesperson announces that ICE had shot and injured a man in Minneapolis, later identified as Julio Cesar Sosa-Celis.; Democratic Representative Robin Kelly fills articles of impeachment against DHS secretary Kristi Noem, following the killing of Renée Good.; The State Department announces the suspension of immigrant VISA processing for 75 countries including Afghanistan, Brazil, Egypt and Somalia.; The House Oversight Committee announces intent to hold former President Bill Clinton and former Secretary of State Hillary Clinton in contempt of Congress after their failure to appear for a scheduled deposition about Jeffrey Epstein.; Danish Foreign Minister Lars Lokke Rasmussen and Greenland's Minister of Foreign Affairs Vivian Motzfeldt attend a closed door meeting with Vice President JD Vance and Secretary of State Marco Rubio.	
Thursday January 15	President Trump threatens using the Insurrection Act on Truth Social in response to ongoing protest in Minneapolis after the killing of Renée Good by ICE.; Vice President Vance breaks a voting tie to block a Senate bill aiming to curb President Trump's military action in Venezuela.; The US Coast Guard seized a sixth sanctioned oil tanker in the Caribbean Sea, the tanker reportedly had ties to Venezuela.; Venezuelan opposition leader María Corina Machado presents her Nobel Peace Prize medal to President Trump during their private meeting at the White House. The Nobel committee clarifies that the honor the prize represents “cannot be revoked, shared, or transferred to others”.	President Trump is gifted the Nobel Peace Prize medal awarded to María Corina Machado at the White House Oval Office. President Trump announces a healthcare plan from the Oval Office.
Friday January 16	A security officer assigned to Labor Secretary Lori Chavez-DeRemer was placed on leave after allegations of the two engaging in a romantic relationship. Chavez-DeRemer is married.	
Saturday January 17	Trump threatens a 25% tariff on Denmark, Norway, Sweden, France, Germany, the United Kingdom, the Netherlands and Finland, unless he is allowed to purchase Greenland.; Hands off Greenland protests occurs in cities across Greenland and Denmark, in response to Trump's continued threats to annex Greenland.	Hands off Greenland protest in Copenhagen.
Sunday January 18	In a text exchange with the prime minister of Norway, Trump writes that because Norway "decided not to give me the Nobel Peace Prize", he now no longer feels "an obligation to think purely of Peace." Opposition leaders called the text exchange "unhinged and embarrassing" and questioned his fitness for office.	
Monday January 19	Following widespread criticism that the administration had not issued a proclamation recognizing the annual Martin Luther King Jr. holiday, the White House issues one late on Monday evening. The statement was not shared on either the White House or the president's social media and makes no mention of racial justice or African Americans.	
Tuesday January 20	US Immigration and Customs Enforcement (ICE) agents detained Liam Conejo Ramos, a 5-year-old child with an active immigration case in Columbia Heights in Minneapolis, causing widespread public and political outrage.	Liam Conejo Ramos (cropped)
Wednesday January 21	President Trump arrives in Davos, Switzerland to attend the 2026 Davos World Economic Forum (WEF). Trump spoke in favor of 'negotiations on the acquisition of Greenland' proposed by himself, but ruled out the use of military force. His speech was harsh in criticising NATO and Europe.; During his trip in Davos, Trump mistakenly refers to "Greenland" as "Iceland" nearly a half dozen times.; The Department of Education pulled back from its prior attempts to enforce a sweeping anti-DEI Dear Colleague letter that had been issued in early 2025. The letter had referenced the Supreme Court case of Students for Fair Admissions v Harvard.	
Thursday January 22	The United States officially withdraws from the World Health Organization. citing the organization's actions during the COVID-19 pandemic and saying the organization unfairly criticized Trump in the pandemic's early days.; In an interview from Davos, Trump falsely claims that NATO troops in the war of Afghanistan avoided frontline combat. His remarks draw widespread condemnation among NATO leaders.; The National Park Service dismantles exhibits about slavery at the President’s House Site in Independence National Historical Park, immediately provoking a lawsuit from the city of Philadelphia.; Vice President Vance delivers remarks in Toledo, Ohio, and Minneapolis, Minnesota.; An AI image is posted by Interior Secretary Doug Burgum to social media, showing himself and "Coalie" a lump of coal with mining garb and giant eyes to promote Trump's American Energy Dominance Agenda.	Papers found taped to the stripped down walls at the President's House explaining the National Park Service's removal of the slavery exhibits. Vice President Vance delivers remarks in Toledo, Ohio. Vice President Vance delivers remarks in Minneapolis, Minnesota. An AI-generated image of Coalie posted by Doug Burgum
Friday January 23	In Minneapolis-St. Paul, thousands of protesters demonstrate in sub-zero temperatures and hundreds of businesses close in a general strike in opposition of immigration enforcement operations in Minnesota.; President Trump withdraws 'Board of Peace' invitation for Canadian Prime Minister Mark Carney. Carney had previously given a highly acclaimed speech at the WEF in Davos.; Vice President Vance announces that the US would stop funding for any organization working on diversity and transgender issues abroad.; The Pentagon issues a National Defense Strategy that told US allies to take control of their own security and was the first updated document since 2022.	Downtown Minneapolis demonstration against ICE, January 23, 2026
Saturday January 24	Minneapolis man Alex Pretti is killed by United States Border Patrol agents amid widespread protests against a federal immigration crackdown. His is the third death during federal immigration efforts in Minneapolis in three weeks.; In the wake of Pretti's killing, Pam Bondi sends a letter to Minnesota Governor Tim Walz making demands which include giving the justice department federal access to the state's voter rolls. It is not clear what voter rolls have to do with immigration enforcement.; President Trump posts to Truth Social an AI-generated image of himself walking with a penguin through a snowy mountain landscape. The penguin was shown holding an American flag, with the Greenland flag planted in the landscape. The Department of Defense also posted a similar version of the image.; The White House holds a private screening of the Amazon film Melania as a private 70 person, VIP black tie event in the East Room of the White House.; A report was filed with the Washington Metropolitan Police Department alleging forced sexual contact by Labor Secretary Lori Chavez-DeRemer's husband; Dr. Shawn DeRemer, against staffers in the department from December 2025.	Alex Pretti VA Image (official portrait by United States Department of Veterans Affairs)
Sunday January 25	Statements made by Department of Homeland Security officials about the killing of Alex Pretti are contradicted by video evidence and witness testimony.; A federal funding package is declared to be up in the air, as Senate Democrats announced their refusal to vote in approval for it if the funding includes appropriates for the Department of Homeland Security which oversees ICE after the shooting of Alex Pretti.; Defense secretary Pete Hegseth posts a "How To" graphic on social media, with the graphic reading "1. Don’t be here illegally. 2. Don’t attack I.C.E. officers. 3. Obey federal and state laws".	
Monday January 26	President Trump announces that Border Czar Tom Homan would be dispatched to Minnesota. He later posted in a separate Truth Social post that he and Minnesota Governor Tim Walz had spoken over the phone.; President Trump and Homeland Security secretary Kristi Noem, and her aid Corey Lweandowski held a two-hour meeting at the White House at Noems request.; The Treasury Department cancels multiple contracts with Booz Allen Hamilton consulting firm, after a contractor with the firm leaked confidential IRS information.; A recording of Senator Ted Cruz appears to show Cruz criticizing Tucker Carlson, Vice President Vance and President Trump and their policies.; Chief US District Judge Patrick Schiltz orders acting ICE director Todd Lyons to appear in court in reference to the case of Juan Tobay Robles. Tobay Robles had been denied a bond hearing or otherwise released from detention within seven days of a prior order.; Customs & Border Protection commander-at-large Greg Bovino is slated to return to El Centro, California to resume duties as chief of that sector, after his temporary position ended.; A statement from ICE and from the president of the Lombardy region Attilio Fontana announces the inclusion of ICE agents in support roles for the Department of State's Diplomatic Security Service, and as body guards for Vice President Vance and Secretary of State Marco Rubio during the 2026 Winter Olympics. The announcement drew wide spread outrage and concern due to the brutal and violent immigration crackdowns by ICE agents recently.; FBI director Kash Patel announced an investigation into the Signal group texts Minnesota resident use to share information about immigration raids and ICE movements.	
Tuesday January 27	Representative Ilhan Omar is attacked during a town hall in Minneapolis, where a man charged at her and appeared to spray her with an unknown liquid. The man was arrested and booked on suspicion of third degree assault.; The United Kingdom, France, Ireland, Germany and Canada, issues travel advisories for their citizens who may be traveling to the United States. The alerts highlighted concerns about safety, extreme weather, and political unrest.; The Ecuadorian Ministry of Foreign Affairs states that an ICE agent had attempted to enter the Ecuadorian consulate in Minneapolis causing the activation of emergency protocols.	President Trump gaggles with the press before departing the White House. President Trump delivers remarks in Clive, Iowa. President Trump visits a restaurant in Urbandale, Iowa.
Wednesday January 28	President Trump urges Iran to make a deal on nuclear weapons on Truth Social, following up that if a deal is not reached the next attack on Iran would be worse.; Nicki Minaj, a legal permanent resident of the United States, posts an image of a physical Trump Gold Card to social media after pledging hundreds of thousands of dollars to the Trump accounts program.; Chief US District Judge Patrick Schiltz states that ICE had violated nearly 100 court orders stemming from Operation Metro Surge and the organization had violated multiple judicial directives in one month.; The FBI seizes original 2020 voting records, absentee ballots, tabulator tapes from voting machines, and 2020 voter rolls from Fulton County, Georgia. The seized material allegedly "constitutes evidence of the commission of a criminal offense" per the warrant.; President Trump posts a series of discredited conspiracy theories about the 2020 and 2016 presidential elections, including that Italian military satellites had been used to hack US voting machines to flip votes in the 2020 elections.	President Trump delivers remarks on Trump accounts.
Thursday January 29	President Trump, his sons Eric and Don Jr, and the Trump Organization sue the IRS and the US Treasury Department over alleged leaks of confidential tax information, seeking at least $10 billion in damages. The unprecedented lawsuit is widely considered a conflict of interest because that the President is suing federal agencies he oversees.	
Friday January 30	The Department of Justice releases additional documents related to Jeffrey Epstein, which included tens of thousands of material including photos, videos, court records, FBI & DOJ documents and others.; Amazon MGM Studios releases Melania Trump's film Melania in 2,000 theaters domestically and 5,000 worldwide. The film receives poor reviews and bombs at the box office, grossing $16.7 million on a budget of $40 million.; The Department of Justice arrested and charged Don Lemon, Georgia Fort and two others after Lemon livestreamed an anti-ICE protest inside Cities Church in Saint Paul, Minnesota.; President Trump signs an executive order launching the Freedom 250 Grand Prix an IndyCar street race through the capitol in August 2026.; US Border Patrol Commander at Large Gregory Bovino is asked to leave a Las Vegas bar over safety concerns for the bar’s patrons.	President Trump signs an executive order launching the Freedom 250 Grand Prix of Washington, D.C. First Lady Melania Trump delivers a speech at the premiere of her biography film Melania in Washington D.C.
Saturday January 31	A partial government shutdown occurs after the Senate passed a funding package, but still missing the approval of the House.; Country wide protests and strikes are held to oppose the deaths of Renee Good and Alex Pretti as well as the continued operations of ICE.; The newly released Epstein documents reveal previously unknown sexual allegations made against Trump from women who were allegedly minors at the time.	ICE protest in downtown Minneapolis, Minnesota

=== February 2026 ===
Date	Events	Photos/videos
Sunday February 1	Liam Conejo Ramos and his father are released by ICE from custody after US District Judge Fred Biery directed for the two to be released the day before.; House Speaker Mike Johnson states that the House would be able to vote and end the partial government shutdown by Tuesday February 3.; Airport travelers without a Real ID may be charged a $45 transaction fee per updated regulations from the Transportation Security Administration.; Update regulations for SNAP benefits begin, under President Trump's July 2025 mega bill with the upper age limit for work requirements being raised and exemptions for those with dependents were also changed.; President Trump announces plans to close the Kennedy Center for two years beginning July 4, 2026 for two years of renovations. The announcement drew criticism included from President Kennedy's grandson Jack Schlossberg.	
Monday February 2	The National Immigration Law Center and five other legal organizations files suit against Secretary of State Marco Rubio and the State Department against a VISA ban against about 75 countries.; It was reported that the Department of Homeland Security and ICE purchased a large warehouse in Berks County, Pennsylvania, reportedly to use along with more than 20 other locations to use an immigration detention centers.; President Trump states that Republicans should nationalize elections and take them over from the states, and continued to make comments about potential voter fraud.; The United States and India announce that they reached a trade deal and would immediately begin to lower tariffs on each other's goods.; President Trump formally launches “Project Vault,” a $12 billion U.S. strategic critical-minerals reserve to stockpile rare earths and battery metals, aiming to shield American industry from China-linked supply shocks.	
Tuesday February 3	President Trump holds a bilateral meeting with Colombian President Gustavo Petro at the White House.; Federal Reserve Governor Stephen Miran resigns his position as chair of the White House Council of Economic Advisors.; HHS Secretary Robert Kennedy Jr announces the launching of the Safety Through Recovery, Engagement and Evidence Based Treatment and Supports (STREETS) substance abuse initiative to support health care and treatment of addicts.	President Trump and Colombian President Gustavo Petro
Wednesday February 4	Border Czar Tom Homan states that the Trump administration would draw down 700 federal law enforcement officers from Minnesota, with around 2,000 federal agents remaining in the state.; Treasury Secretary Scott Bessent speaks at the House Financial Services Committee hearing with sharp exchanges seen over fiscal policy, business dealing of the Trump family, and other concerns.; President Trump speaks with NBC Nightly News anchor Tom Llamas about immigration, Joe Rogan, the economy and upcoming projects.; DSH Secretary Kristi Noem visits the border wall in Nogales, Arizona to present Border Patrol agents with awards in a ceremony.; A federal judge rules that President Trump waited "too long" after the Supreme Courts decision on presidential immunity to attempt to move his criminal hush money case from New York to federal court.	Vice President Vance and Secretary Rubio deliver remarks at the Critical Minerals Ministerial.
Thursday February 5	It is announced that Vice President Vance's top lawyer Sean Cooksey has left his position to enter into the private sector. Cooksey was instrumental in the TikTok deal and forming the Justice Departments Division for National Fraud Enforcement.; The US Census Bureau test survey for the 2030 census included a question about whether the respondent is a US citizen, something that is not supposed to be included and has not been asked in over 75 years.; President Trump posts a third party created video on Truth Social, raising conspiracy theories that he had won the 2020 election and included an image of former President and First Lady Obama as apes, drawing outrage.	
Friday February 6	Vice President Vance and Second Lady Vance attend the 2026 Winter Olympics opening ceremony where they were booed and jeered at when they appeared on the big screen. Viewers in the United States reportedly were shown the Vice President and Second lady without the boos while all other international broadcasters did.; Talks between representatives of the United States and Iran are held in Geneva to discuss the terms for Tehran's nuclear program to be updated to follow UN nuclear weapons standards.	President Trump gaggles with the press before departing the White House.
Saturday February 7	Federal Judge JP Boulee unseals court filings related to the FBI's seizure of hundred of thousands of ballots in Fulton County, Georgia relating to the 2020 presidential election. Boulee also issued an order that the Justice Department must file publicly the federal prosecutors arguments to have the search warrant issued originally.	
Sunday February 8	President Trump responds to US Olympic skier Hunter Hess on Truth Social, after Hess stated he had mixed emotions representing the United States due to "things going on back home." Trump called Hess a "loser" and suggested he should not have tried out for the team.; President Trump hosts a Super Bowl watch party for GOP lawmakers at Mar-a-Largo. During the game, Trump posted on Truth Social to criticize the halftime performance by Bad Bunny.; Secretary of Defense Pete Hegseth kicks off the Turning Points USA All-American Halftime Show by a video message referencing the support of his department for the show and the US's 250th anniversary.	
Monday February 9	Ghislaine Maxwell, refuses to answer questions at a closed-door congressional deposition after evoking the fifth amendment as Maxwell has a habeas petition pending attempting to over turn her conviction. Her attorney David Oscar Markus, issued a statement that Maxwell was prepared to speak if Trump granted her clemency, and that both Trump and Clinton were "innocent of any wrongdoing".; President Trump threatens to block the opening of the new Gordie Howe International bridge between Detroit and Windsor, Ontario via Truth Social over a range of issues.; The Trump administration proposes an updated regulation that would impact federal workers fired through a Reduction in Force, as it would strip power of an independent border that reviews challenges from fired workers.; The Congressional Budget Office (CBO) releases a report detailing the country's budget. The report showed in the first third of fiscal year 2026 the government was operating at a deficit and borrowed US$696 billion with total national debt more than US$38.5 trillion.	Vice President Vance delivers remarks with Prime Minister Nikol Pashinyan of Armenia.
Tuesday February 10	Vice President Vance's social media account posts and then deleted a post commemorating the massacres of Armenians as a "genocide" contradicting the stance of US ally Turkey. Vance was on a two-day trip to Armenia and visited the Tsitsernakaberd Armenian Genocide Memorial in Yerevan during the trip.; The National Park Service removes the rainbow flag from Stonewall National Monument, the nation's first LBGTQ+ federal monument.	Press secretary Karoline Leavitt briefs members of the media.
Wednesday February 11	Attorney General Pam Bondi testifies in front of the House Judiciary Committee about ongoing controversies such as, the Jeffrey Epstein file releases, investigation into President Trump's political rivals and foes, and the handling of the ICE shooting deaths of Renee Good and Alex Pretti.; Judges in Northern District of New York announce that they had appointed and sworn in Donald Kinsella after the former acting US Attorney General for the district had been found unlawfully serving. Shortly after the announcement Deputy Attorney General Todd Blanche appeared to fire Kinsella via social media.; The House passes the SAVE America Act, 218 to 213. The bill would have sweeping changes to voting regulations by requiring proof of citizenship at voter registration, a national photo ID requirement to vote and significantly curtail mail-in-voting.; Public opinion polling agency Gallup announces that they would discontinue tracking presidential approval ratings after more than eight decades of doing so.; President Trump threatens that "any Republican" who voted against tariff measures would "seriously suffer the consequences come Election time" on Truth Social, shortly after six Republicans voted against proposed tariffs against Canada.; Vice President Vance tells CNN reporters that Olympians should try to bring their countries together and to do that is "...not to show up in a foreign country and attack the president of the United States, but it's to play your sport and represent the country well."	
Thursday February 12	The Justice Department Antitrust chief Abigail Slater announces her departure from the position via social media, with her temporary replacement named as Omeed Assefi.; Speaker Mike Johnson states that he disapproved of the Justice Department surveilling all lawmakers who visit the agency to review the unredacted Epstein files.; President Trump pardons five former NFL players, Joe Klecko, Nate Newton, Jamal Lewis, Travis Henry and the late Billy Cannon of crimes. The men were found guilty of crimes such as perjury, drug trafficking, and counterfeiting.; DHS Secretary Kristi Noem visits the Otay Mesa detention facility and spoke in front of a display of boxes reportedly containing seized illicit drugs at the Otay Mesa Port of Entry. Noem was joined by US Border Patrol Chief Mike Banks, San Diego County Assistant Sheriff Ken Jones and CBP Acting Executive Assistant Commissioner Diane Sabatino.; A group of NYC officials including Manhattan borough president Brad Hoylman-Sigal and Representative Jerrold Nadler, hold a rally during which they replace the rainbow flag NPS had removed from Stonewall National Monument.; Denying an overwhelming scientific consensus, the Environmental Protection Agency repeals the official scientific determination that legally gives the government the authority to combat climate change.	A rainbow pride flag raising event at Christopher Park, following the National Park Service's removal.
Friday February 13	A report released by the Democratic chair of the Senate Foreign Relations Committee states that the Trump administration had currently spent more than $30 million to deport migrants from the US, with some costing $1 million a piece.; Two golfers sue President Trump and his administration in an attempt to stop the planned take over and redevelopment of the capitols public golf course. The Interior Department had terminated the lease for the course in December 2025, with Trump suggesting converting the course to host major championships and international competition in February 2026.; The Justice Department sues Harvard University for allegedly failing to comply with the departments investigation into admissions decisions, in a follow up investigation from the Supreme Court case of Students for Fair Admissions v Harvard.; The Department of Education announces the opening of a Title IX investigation into the Puyallup School District and its handling of a complaint made regarding a transgender student.; The Department of Education announces an investigation into the Louisiana Board of Regents and its efforts to have 60% of adults in the state holding a college degree or other credential. The department has raised claims that the objectives for Black and Hispanic students are discriminatory compared to other races.; It is reported that DHS Secretary Kristi Noem and top advisor Corey Lewandowski fired a US Coast Guard pilot after Noem's blanket went missing during a switch to a second plane. The pilot was rehired after it was discovered that no one else was qualified to fly the pair back.; A federal judge dismisses assault charges against Alfredo Alejandro Aljorna and Julio Cesar Sosa-Celis when video evidence reveals that the ICE officers who shot Sosa-Celis were not assaulted and lied about the event.	
Saturday February 14	A partial government shutdown begins after Congressional Democrats and President Trump's team failed to reach a deal that would continue funding for the DHS through September 2026.; Secretary of State Marco Rubio speaks at the Munich Security Conference stating that "the United States and Europe belong together", pivoting from Vice President Vance's more combative tone in 2025.	
Sunday February 15	President Trump's trade and manufacturing adviser Peter Navarro state that the White House may force data center builders to absorb their costs during Fox News' Sunday Morning Futures.	
Monday February 16	Federal judge Cynthia Rufe rules that the Trump administration must restore slavery-related exhibits at the national park site of former President George Washington's home in Philadelphia. The displays had been removed in January 2026, and included information about Washingtons slaves including Ona Judge who escaped from slavery.; Former US Secretary of State Hillary Clinton accuses President Trump and the Justice Department of orchestrating a "cover-up" of the Jeffrey Epstein files and that she and her husband, former President Bill Clinton had nothing to hide.; Democrats send a counter offer on immigration enforcement and funding for DHS in an attempt to end the ongoing partial government shutdown.	
Tuesday February 17	Tricia McLaughlin, the spokesperson for DHS Secretary Kristi Noem announces her intent to leave the position.; Secretary of Defense Pete Hegseth invites pastor Douglas Wilson, a radical Christian nationalist, to lead the audience in the Pentagon's auditorium in Christian prayer service.	
Wednesday February 18	The Trump administration pays the remaining portion of the Gateway rail tunnel project with additional funding to allow for construction to continue. This occurred after a federal judge ordered Transportation Secretary Sean Duffy and President Trump to do so.; A directive memo is included in federal court fillings and instructed ICE to detain refugees who entered the US lawfully but have not obtained a permanent resident card a year after their admission.; California and about a dozen other states sue the federal government to force the payout of grants previously approved by Congress for clean energy projects.; US District Judge Laura Provinzino orders Matthew Isihara a government attorney to be held in civil contempt of court for violating the order for the Justice Department to return identification documents to Rigoberto Soto Jimenez.	
Thursday February 19	President Trump announces at the inaugural Board of Peace meeting that nine members had pledged $7 billion towards a Gaza relief package and five countries; Indonesia, Morocco, Kazakhstan, Kosovo and Albania had pledged to deploy troops as part of internal stabilization.; President Trump announces that he would decide whether to launch military strikes against Iran within the next 10 days during the inaugural Board of Peace meeting.; In response to the US Women's Olympic Ice Hockey team winning gold in their match against Canada, the White House reposted a celebratory post from the official USA Hockey account with some added text.; It is reported that the husband of Secretary of Labor Lori Chavez-DeRemer was barred from the department's headquarters after alleged sexual misconduct and harassment against at least two female staffers in December 2025.	
Friday February 20	The Supreme Court rules that President Trump exceeded his authority in imposing tariffs on products entering the United States under the 1977 law; International Emergency Economic Powers Act. The ruling invalidates many, but not all of the enacted tariffs.; The Smithsonian Museum displays First Lady Melania Trump's ballgown from her husband's second inauguration.; Newly released government data shows the US GDP grew 1.4% in the last quarter of 2025, significantly less than the two previous quarters and half of 2024's 2.8% growth rate.	
Saturday February 21	President Trump announces that he would increase global tariffs to 15%, the day after the Supreme Court struck down his "reciprocal tariffs". The announcement came via Truth Social.; President Trump announces that he was sending a hospital ship to Greenland to supply the area with health care, via Truth Social.; President Trump and First Lady Trump attend the Governor Dinner held in the East room of the White House.; FBI Director Kash Patel meets with the Milan Joint Operations Center, an interagency and international endeavor to support the Winter Olympics and Paralympic Games.	
Sunday February 22	An armed man is shot and killed by Secret Service after driving into a secure perimeter of Mar-a-Largo in the early morning. President Trump was in residence at the White House at the time of the incident.; FBI Director Kash Patel posts on social media defending his presence in the US Men's Olympic Ice Hockey team locker room after their gold medal game and participating in celebrations.; Shortly after the US Men's Olympic Ice Hockey gold medal game, the White House posts a direct response of Prime Minister Trudeau post after the Canadian 2025 4 Nations win. The White House posted image showed an American bald eagle trampling a Canadian goose.; President Trump speaks with the US Men's Olympic hockey team via video call after their gold medal game and invited them to the 2026 State of the Union address. During the call Trump jokes that he would be have to invite the US Women's Olympic hockey team as well, because he would impeached if he did not. The moment draws outrage online.; Pivoting from a prior announcement DHS announces that TSA PreCheck would remain operational barring staffing concerns, and Global Entry would remain closed. Both programs had been announced as closed earlier in response to the partial government shutdown, causing outcry.	
Monday February 23	US stock futures fall and gold prices jump after President Trump announces new tariffs, appearing to show market uncertainty.; US District Judge Aileen Cannon permanently bars the Justice Department from releasing special counsel Jack Smiths report of Trump stockpiling classified documents at Mar-a-Largo.; Data reported by the White House and Congressional Republicans show that the average tax refund increased by only about $300 under the $1k originally reported by supporters of the One Big Beautiful Bill Act.; The US Women's Olympic Hockey team announces that it was declining President Trump's invitation to the State of the Union, after he had joked about inviting them to the men's team a day prior.; President Trump posts an AI video to Truth Social, depicting him in a suit playing as a member of the US Men's Olympic hockey team, before attacking a Canadian player and sitting in the penalty box set to "Eye of the Tiger".; A class action lawsuit is filed by the Protect Democracy nonprofit and several law firms, alleging federal agents are unconstitutionally retaliating against lawful observers and recording ICE operations by gathering personal information and labeling them as domestic terrorists.; A three-judge panel decline to block the new congressional map for Utah, stating that the Republican led challenge was unlikely to succeed and it was too close to the election.; It is announced that Democratic Senator Alex Padilla would give the Spanish language rebuttal to the State of the Union address. Padilla drew national attention after being handcuffed and forced to the ground after interrupting and attempting to question DHS secretary Kristi Noem in 2025 during a news conference.	
Tuesday February 24	President Trump delivers his first official State of the Union Address in the second term.; Nurul Amin Shah Alam, a missing immigrant left by Border Patrol agents in Buffalo, New York after being released from Erie County jail on February 19 is found deceased. Buffalo Mayor Sean Ryan called the Border Patrols actions unprofessional and inhumane with no known attempt to release him in a safe secure location or with family.; Senator Richard Dubin sends a letter to the Government Accountability Office and the Justice Department inspector general using whistleblower information claiming that the FBI elite evidence response team was delayed in responding to the Brown University shooting due to FBI director Kash Patel's usage of the jets.; FBI director Kash Patel's schedule during his trip to Italy leading up to the US Olympic Men's Ice Hockey game is released to the public leading to questions and concerns about Patel's use of government resources.; Defense Secretary Pete Hegseth meets with AI start-up Anthropic's CEO Dario Amodei to demand the US military is given unfettered access to its Claude AI by February 27 or have the government label the AI bot a risk to the supply chain. Hegseth also threatened to invoke the Defense Production Act from the Cold War, to compel Anthropic to work with the Defense Department.; A case files by 14 state attorney generals and the governor of Pennsylvania aims to reverse the stated number of childhood vaccinations after the updated guidances were announced in January 2026.	President Trump delivers his first official State of the Union Address in the second term. US Olympics Men's Hockey Team posing with President Trump during visit to the White House
Wednesday February 25	Cuban border patrol troops kills four people and wounded six others after a confrontation labeled by Cuba as an attempted terrorist attack, where a Florida registered speedboat approached Cuban territorial waters. The speedboats passengers were identified as Cuban nationals living in the United States, and taken by authorities for medical treatment.; US District Judge Brian Murphy rules that the DHS policy allowing for immigration authorities to deport migrants to "third world" countries that are not the migrants home countries without first giving notice or ability to object was unlawful.; The Defense Department shoots down a US Customs and Border Protection drone near Fort Hancock, Texas and the US-Mexico border.	
Thursday February 26	Former secretary of State Hillary Clinton speaks in front of the House Oversight and Government Reform Committee in regards to Jeffrey Epstein and his relationship with the Clintons. She claimed the hearing was "partisan political theater", citing lack of questions regarding Trump and Epstein's relationship or asking Florida or New York prosecutors about Epstein's sweetheart deal in 2008 to dodge federal sex trafficking charges. She also denied having any knowledge to assist the panel.; The deposition of former secretary of state Hillary Clinton is paused after right-wing political commentator Benny Johnson posted a picture Clinton testifying during the closed door meeting. Johnson claimed that he had been provided the image by Representative Lauren Boebert potentially violating House rules.; USA men's hockey team member Brady Tkachuk speaks out against the AI video President Trump posted using an AI image of Tkachuk and his voice stating “They booed our national anthem, so I had to come out and teach those maple syrup eating fuckers a lesson.”; A Columbia University student, reportedly from Azerbaijan, was arrested by DHS officers who reportedly misrepresented themselves as New York police officers looking for a missing child to gain entry into a residential building.; FBI director Kash Patel fires at least six agents tied to the 2022 search of Mar-a-Largo.; The Department of Justice files suit against five additional states; Utah, Oklahoma, Kentucky, New Jersey and West Virginia to access their voter records and election data.; US District Judge Richard Leon struck down the National Trust for Historic Preservation's request to block the construction of the White House ballroom, stating that the group would have better chances if they amended the lawsuit.; Vice President Vance delivers remarks at a Precision Manufacturing Facility in Plover, Wisconsin.	The photograph of Hillary Clinton testifying taken by Lauren Boebert that was leaked by Benny Johnson. Vice President Vance delivers remarks at a Precision Manufacturing Facility in Plover, Wisconsin.
Friday February 27	Former President Bill Clinton speaks in front of the House Oversight and Government Reform Committee in regards to Jeffrey Epstein and his relationship with the Clintons. In his opening statement Clinton claimed he did nothing wrong and saw nothing, and "it doesn't help you for me to play detective 24 years later."; Refugees and others file a lawsuit in Massachusetts federal court against DHS secretary Kristi Noem, acting director of ICE Todd Lyons and others over a new policy that would allow the agency to detain refugees without a warrant.	
Saturday February 28	The United States and Israeli militaries launch joint strikes on Iran, targeting key officials, and military facilities.; The United States strikes the Shajareh Tayyebeh Elementary School in Minab with several waves of Tomahawk missles killing 156 people, including 120 schoolchildren. It is the deadliest US attack on civilians in the 21st century, and a UN investigation would later call it a war crime.	President Trump addresses the joint strikes against Iran to the nation.

=== March 2026 ===
Date	Events	Photos/videos
Sunday March 1	Three US F-15E Strike Eagle fighter jets are shot down by Kuwaiti air defenses in an apparent friendly fire situation, all six crew members ejected safely.	President Trump announces the death of Iranian supreme leader Ali Khamenei
Monday March 2	Defense Secretary Pete Hegseth speaks about concerns that the US-Israeli strikes could cause long term regional conflict stating that it would not be similar to the Iraq conflict while speaking with Air Force General Dan Caine, the chairman of the Joint Chiefs of Staff.; The US Central Command (CENTCOM) announces the death of a fourth US service member after they had been wounded during the initial attacks on Iran on Saturday. The number was increased to six shortly after.; Global crude oil prices surge by 8% and stocks fell in the United States after the start of the Iran conflict by the United States and Israel, and the closure of the Strait of Hormuz.; US Court of Appeals for the Federal Circuit declines to delay implementation of the Supreme Court ruling that invalidated a majority of President Trump's tariffs.; Seven environmental groups, led by the Center for Biological Diversity challenge a series of amendments to the Bureau of Land Management resource management plans in Montana, California, Colorado, Idaho, Nevada, North Dakota, South Dakota, Utah and Wyoming. The groups asked a federal judge to enjoin and remand the plans.; Minnesota sues the Trump administration officials, including Dr. Oz, and Health Secretary Robert Kennedy Jr for a temporary restraining order against the withholding of Medicaid from the state by the administration.; The Supreme Court blocks California from enforcing state rules that restrict the school's ability to notify parents if their student comes out as transgender and enforcing the use of the student's preferred pronouns.; First Lady Melania Trump speaks at a UN Security Council meeting which focused on children in conflict, stating that the US stood with all children throughout the world.	
Tuesday March 3	Following drone attacks on the US Embassies in Riyadh and Kuwait, the US Embassies in Saudi Arabia, Kuwait and Lebanon are closed to the public. The US State Department ordered the evacuation of all non-emergency personnel and family from Kuwait, Bahrain, Iraq, Qatar, Jordan and the UAE.; Department of Labor's chief of staff Jihun Han and deputy chief of staff Rebecca Wright step down and submitted letters of resignation to secretary Lori Chavez-DeRemer amidst an internal watchdog's investigation of alleged misconduct at the department.; President Trump holds a bilateral meeting with German Chancellor Friedrich Merz at the White House.	President Trump and German Chancellor Friedrich Merz
Wednesday March 4	Melissa Robey, the director of advance for Labor Secretary Lori Chavez-DeRemer, is put on administrative leave amid the expanding internal investigation into alleged misconduct.; The USS Charlotte a US submarine sinks the IRIS Dena an Iranian warship in international waters near Sri Lanka.	
Thursday March 5	President Trump announces he is replacing DHS Secretary Kristi Noem and nominating Senator Markwayne Mullin to take her place. Trump says Noem will be "Special Envoy for The Shield of the Americas," a security initiative focusing on the Western Hemisphere.; The House votes on a measure to block or curb President Trump's ability from taking further military action against Iran without Congressional support.; The Senate fails to reach the 60-vote threshold to fund the Department of Homeland Security, continuing the ongoing partial government shutdown.; The National Capital Planning Commission holds a meeting to discuss President Trump's planned White House ballroom, with the final vote to be held on April 2. More than 100 people are registered to speak during the meeting.; The Department of Justice releases additional documents related to the Jeffrey Epstein case, including uncorroborated allegations against Epstein and President Trump. The documents were reportedly not released initially as they had been categorized as duplicates.; About two dozen states has filed suit against President Trump and his planned new global tariff policies that were enacted after the Supreme Court decision.; Defense Secretary Pete Hegseth meets with representatives of several Latin American countries to discuss security goals in a joint conference titled "Americas Counter Cartel Conference".	
Friday March 6	On Truth Social, President Trump posts about the Iran war stating that only after unconditional surrender by Iran and the choosing of an "acceptable leader" would the war end. Trump closed the post with "MAKE IRAN GREAT AGAIN (MIGA!)".; US crude oil prices break $90 per barrel, with the US Development Finance Corporation beginning the creation of a $20 billion reinsurance facility in an effort to move tankers through the Strait of Hormuz.; Following a Supreme Court decision the US Customs and Border Protection agency claims that they are unable to immediately start issuing tariff refunds due to unprecedented volume.; FDA Commissioner Marty Makary announces the departure of FDA Vaccine Chief Dr. Vinay Prasad in late April. Prasad will leave the FDA for a second time with this departure.; The US Department of Interior announces the proposal of a new rule to overturn restrictions that would then allow for state regulations to apply to national preserves, potentially expanding hunting, trapping and fishing in national preserves.; The Social Security Administrations inspector general notifies members of House and Senate committees that they are reviewing a complaint of potential misuse of SSA data by a former DOGE employee.; The Authors Guild files suit against the National Endowment for the Humanities, its acting chair, and several DOGE staffers in a class action lawsuit against the cancelation of multiple grants that were tagged as DEI.	
Saturday March 7	Staffers of the Office of the Architect of the Capitol install a plaque honoring the US Capitol Police and other law enforcement agencies that helped protect the capitol during the January 6, 2021 riot.; President Trump hosts Latin American leaders at Trump National Doral Miami for the Shield of the Americas summit, appearing briefly.; Two men are taken into custody after an improvised explosive device was thrown outside Gracie Mansion in New York City. The device was thrown during an anti-Islam demonstration led by conservative influencer Jake Lang, resulting in a counterprotest.; The Department of Health and Human Services confirms the cancelation of the first public meeting of the Interagency Autism Coordinating Committee.; President Trump, First Lady Melania Trump, Vice President Vance, Second Lady Usha Vance, Defense Secretary Pete Hegseth, Attorney General Pam Bondi and Middle East Special Envoy Steve Witkoff attended the dignified transfer of the remains of six soldiers killed in the Iran conflict at the Dover Air Force Base.	President Trump with state leaders of North and South America at the Shield of the Americas Summit President Trump at dignified transfer ceremony
Sunday March 8	While speaking on Fox News with Maria Bartiromo, White House press secretary Karoline Leavitt speaks about concerns that President Trump would institute a draft for the Iran conflict. Leavitt acknowledge the concerns about a draft but that Trump has not taken the option out of consideration.	
Monday March 9	The international standard for crude oil surges to nearly $120 a barrel, about 65% higher than prior to the Iran conflict, before dropping to below $100. President Trump on Truth Social claims that there is no oil shortage and prices would drop.; Anthropic sues the Trump administration for declaring the AI company a risk to the Defense Departments supply chain, claiming the government violated its First Amendment rights.; In an interview with CBS, President Trump alleges that the Iran conflict was almost over and that the country had basically nothing left to continue fighting. He also stated that the United States could take over the Strait of Hormuz and do a lot with it.; President Trump announces that he had donated $1 million to House Speaker Mike Johnson's fundraiser, while speaking at House GOP members Issues Conference.	
Tuesday March 10	President Trump appoints Erika Kirk to a 16-member advisory panel of the US Air Force Academy, along with four other appointees such as Senator Tommy Tuberville and Dina Powell.; Video of a deposition of DOGE staffer, Justin Fox is released and reported on as Fox was questioned on the processes of how DOGE identified grants and how they defined DEI.	
Wednesday March 11	The Trump administration announces new trade investigations into China, Mexico, the European Union and over a dozen other economies under Section 301 of the Trade Act of 1974.; Seventeen Democratic-led states sues the Trump administration over the "Admissions and Consumer Transparency Supplement" survey that requires universities to provide admission and student data broken down by race and other aspects.; It is reported that in preliminary findings as part of an ongoing military investigation, the US was determined responsible for the Tomahawk missile strike on the Shajarah Tayyebeh elementary school during the Iran conflict.; During a Trump rally in Hebron, Kentucky, President Trump brings Jake Paul onto the state where Trump claimed Paul would run for office and endorsed him. Paul has not made an announcement for running for office.; Responding to what they called "derogatory and dehumanizing" language aimed at migrants, refugees and asylum seekers, the United Nations Committee on the Elimination of Racial Discrimination issued a statement condemning "racist hate speech by political leaders, including the President".	
Thursday March 12	The Trump administration sues California air regulators over rules aimed at curbing pollution from vehicles, claiming that the state did not have the authority to enforce any of their vehicle emission regulations.	
Friday March 13	It is reported that the Trump administration is set to receive about $10 billion in fees from investors, such as Oracle, Silver Lake, and MGX, through the recently completed deal to control TikTok's US business from the Chinese parent company ByteDance.; In a Truth Social post, President Trump claims that the US military had "obliterated" every military target on Iran's Kharg Island through bombing raids. He claimed that for "decency" they did not wipe out oil infrastructure on the island.; President Trump signs an executive order giving the Department of Energy the ability to use the Defense Production Act from the Cold War. Energy Secretary Chris Wright shortly after ordered the Sable Offshore Corp to restore operations of the Santa Ynez Unit and the Gaviota Coast Pipeline System in Santa Barbara County.; Federal judge Edward Davila rules that the Trump administration unlawfully stated the it couldn't request more funding for the Consumer Financial Protection Bureau. Davila ordered the agencies acting director Russ Vought to continue requesting funds from the Federal Reserve.; Vice President Vance delivers remarks in Rocky Mount, North Carolina.; The Trump administration announced an 80% reduction in cost for those seeking to renounce their US citizenship via a Certificate of Loss of Nationality.	Vice President Vance delivers remarks in Rocky Mount, North Carolina.
Saturday March 14	President Trump called on US allies, China, France, Japan, South Korea, the United Kingdom and others to send warships to the Strait of Hormuz.	
Sunday March 15	While speaking with reporters on Air Force One President Trump suggested that the US's efforts to protect the Strait of Hormuz was unnecessary and that "maybe we shouldn’t even be there at all".; After the Academy Awards, during which presenter Jimmy Kimmel joked about Trump and the Melania documentary, White House Communications Director Steven Cheung posted on social media calling Kimmel a "classless hack".	
Monday March 16	President Trump announces that his Chief of Staff Susie Wiles has been diagnosed with early-stage breast cancer. She is expected to continue her job while undergoing treatment.; The Supreme Court agreed to review the Trump administration's power to curtail temporary protections for migrants from countries experiencing extraordinary conditions.; Federal Judge Brian Murphy ruled in favor of the American Academy of Pediatrics against the US Department of Health and Human Services and the appointment of vaccine advisors.	
Tuesday March 17	President Trump holds a meeting with Taoiseach Micheál Martin of Ireland at the White House.; In a statement posted on social media the director of the National Counterterroism Center, Joe Kent, announced his resignation claiming that Iran posed no imminent threat to the nation prior to the initial attack and claimed the war was started due to Israel and AIPAC.; House Oversight Chair James Comer issued a subpoena to Attorney General Pam Bondi, demanding that Bondi testify over her handling of the Epstein files.; Judge Royce C. Lamberth rules that the Trump administration's orders to defund the Voice of America were illegal, and orders nearly 1,000 journalists and staff to return to work and resume broadcasting by March 23.	President Trump and Taoiseach Micheál Martin
Wednesday March 18	The Senate Homeland Security and Governmental Affairs Committee held a confirmation hearing for Senator Markwayne Mullin after Mullin was nominated to be the director of the Department of Homeland Security by President Trump.; The Federal Transit Administration, issued an investigation into the Illinois Department of Transportation over safety concerns in the Chicago Transit Authority.; President Trump issued a 60-day waiver to the Jones Act, which prevented foreign-flagged ships carrying commodities through US waterways. The statement connected the move with attempts to mitigate the disruptions to the oil market from the Iran conflict.; Dylan Lopez Contreras, a Venezuelan Bronx high school student who came to the United States legally under an asylum program, is released after 10 months of detention in an ICE processing center in Pennsylvania.	
Thursday March 19	President Trump holds a bilateral meeting with Japanese Prime Minister Sanae Takaichi at the White House.	President Trump and Japanese Prime Minister Sanae Takaichi
Friday March 20	A federal judge sides with the New York Times and rules that the Pentagon's restrictive press policy is unconstitutional.; In an attempt to tame oil prices, the Treasury department announced they will temporarily lift sanctions for 30 days on Iranian oil that is currently at sea.	
Saturday March 21	Former FBI director Robert Mueller's death is announced, with President Trump posting shortly after on Truth Social stating "Good, I’m glad he’s dead. He can no longer hurt innocent people!”; President Trump posted on Truth Social stating that if the ongoing government shut down continued he would post ICE at airports in order to assist in TSA agents.	
Sunday March 22		
Monday March 23	The Department of Interior announced that it will pay $1 billion to French company TotalEnergies to walk away from two offshore wind farm leases off the coasts of North Carolina and New York. The payment was a refund of its prior lease payments.; Eight architecture and cultural organizations sued President Trump and the board of the Kennedy Center over the planned renovations of the complex slated to start later in the year. Groups included the American Institute of Architects, DC Preservation League, and American Society of Landscape Architects.; ICE agents were deployed to multiple airports across the country in response to the ongoing government shutdown, with agents reported in Houston, New York City, Newark, Chicago, Atlanta, and Phoenix airports.; President Trump toured Graceland during his visit to Memphis, Tennessee where he was scheduled to speak about crime reduction in the city.; Vice President Vance and Israel Prime Minister Benjamin Netanyahu held a phone call to discuss efforts to renew talks between the US and Iran about a possible ending of the conflict.	
Tuesday March 24	First Lady Melania Trump hosted the Foster the Future Together Global Coalition Summit, including representatives from more than 45 countries and 28 leading technology companies.; On her last day as Secretary of the Department of Homeland Security, Kristi Noem approves the purchase of three luxury jets worth hundreds of millions of dollars in a no-bid contract from one of her political donors.; President Trump attends the swearing in of Markwayne Mullin as Secretary of Homeland Security in the Oval Office by Attorney General Pam Bondi.	Mullin is sworn in as secretary of homeland security
Wednesday March 25	Defense secretary Pete Hegseth hosted his monthly Christian worship service at the Pentagon where he prayed for "every round find its mark....overwhelming violence of action against those who deserve no mercy." Hegseth claimed the prayer was given to him by a military chaplain attached to troops who captured then-President Nicolas Maduro of Venezuela.	
Thursday March 26	The Treasury Department announced that President Trump's signature will appear on US paper currency beginning in coming summer months as part of the country's 250th anniversary. This change will be the first time in 165 years that the bills will not bear the signature of the US Treasurer.; President Trump announced that he used a mail-in-ballot for a special election in Florida, because he felt he should be in the capitol working and couldn't attend the election. However, records showed that Trump mailed the ballot from Palm Beach, FL and has been constantly in the state.; An Epstein victim filed a class action lawsuit in the US District Court for the Northern District of California, against the Trump administration and Google for allegedly wrongfully disclosing and publishing personal information of her and other survivors.; The Department of Education announced that it will relocate its headquarters with the Department of Energy assuming the lease on the building.	
Friday March 27	The FBI confirms that director Kash Patel's personal emails were targeted by an Iranian-linked hacking group Handala after the group posted documents and images online claiming that they were Patels.; The Senate approves a funding package in the early morning for the Department of Homeland Security, but without any funding designated to ICE or Border Protection agencies.; The House Ethics Committee found Democratic Representative Sheila Cherfilus-McCormick guilty of violating several campaign finance laws and regulations.; US Secretary of State Marco Rubio met with other G7 representatives in France and jointly called for an immediate halt of attacks against civilians and urged for the re-opening of the Strait of Hormuz.; The Department of Education that student loan borrowers in the Saving on a Valuable Education (SAVE) Plan would need to switch out of it by July 1, 2026, or be placed automatically into two new repayment plans.; A class action lawsuit is filed by members of the rioters from the January 6, 2021 Capitol attack claiming the actions taken by the Capitol Police and Washington, D.C.’s Metropolitan Police Department caused them physical and emotional injuries.	
Saturday March 28	An estimated 8 million people take part in over 3,300 No Kings protests in the third round of No Kings demonstrations against Trump, his administration and policies. The estimates make it the largest single-day protest in American history.; An investigation was opened by the US Army after two AH-64 Apache attack helicopters flew over the "No Kings" protest in Nashville and then were recorded engaging in low-altitude maneuvers outside Kid Rock's Whites Creek home.; President Trump did not attend the Conservative Political Action Conference (CPAC) held in Dallas, Texas for the first time in 10 years.; Vice President Vance appeared on the Benny Show podcast where he discussed the Iran conflict, inflation, the ongoing government shutdown and files on unidentified anomalous phenomena (UAPs).	No Kings protest in Boise, Idaho March 28, 2026
Sunday March 29	During a Palm Sunday mass in St. Peter's Square, Pope Leo XIV stated that the conflict between Iran, Israel, and the US was "atrocious" and that Jesus could not be used to justify war. Many linked this as a response to Defense Secretary Pete Hegseth's prayer for violence a few days prior.; While speaking with reporters on Air Force One, President Trump confirmed that the new ballroom would become "a shed for what’s being built under." Reports had come out earlier alleging a massive military complex under the construction.	
Monday March 30	Second Lady Usha Vance launched a podcast called "Storytime with the Second Lady" and touched on her relationship with Vice President Vance and personal life.; The Selective Service System submitted a proposed rule for automatic registration into the system which was approved by Congress under the National Defense Authorization Act for fiscal year 2026.	
Tuesday March 31	Vice President Vance's second book "Communion: Finding My Way Back to Faith" was announced with a publishing date in June 2026, following his 2016 memoir "Hillbilly Elegy".; President Trump unveils renderings for his presidential library.; Judge Randolph Moss rules that Trump's executive order banning federal funding for NPR and PBS is voided on First Amendment grounds. Moss writes in his ruling "It is difficult to conceive of clearer evidence that a government action is targeted at viewpoints that the president does not like and seeks to squelch."; The Supreme Court ruled that Colorado's ban on conversion therapy aimed at youths struggling with their sexual orientation or gender identity violates the free speech of a conservative Christian therapist.; Amid the ongoing government shutdown, the tabloid giant TMZ has begun locating, photographing and reporting on both Republican and Democratic legislators while they are actively on vacation during the shutdown.; President Trump signed an executive order seeking to crack down on mail in voting, directing the Homeland Security Department and the Social Security Administration to create an approved list of absentee voters who would be allowed to mail in ballots.; It was reported initially by the Daily Mail that the husband of former former Homeland Security secretary Kristi Noem had posted photos of himself cross-dressing while messaging women on fetish sites while she served as secretary.	

== See also ==
- First 100 days of the second Trump presidency – Period from January to April 2025
- List of executive actions by Donald Trump
- Lists of presidential trips made by Donald Trump (international trips)
- Second presidential transition of Donald Trump – Transfer of presidential power from Joe Biden to Donald Trump
- Timeline of the 2024 United States presidential election

U.S. presidential administration timelines
Preceded by Second Trump presidency (2025 Q4)	Second Trump presidency (2026 Q1)	Succeeded by Second Trump presidency (2026 Q2)
