= Phang v. Blanche =

2026 court case

- Court: United States District Court for the District of Columbia
- Full case name: Katie Phang v. Todd Blanche, in his official capacity as Acting Attorney General of the United States
- Submitted: April 27, 2026; 5 months ago
- Docket nos.: 1:26-cv-01417

Court membership
- Judge sitting: Emmet G. Sullivan

Katie Phang v. Todd Blanche is a lawsuit brought by legal analyst and journalist Katie Phang against the United States Acting Attorney General Todd Blanche, alleging that Blanche had not complied with the Epstein Files Transparency Act. The lawsuit, which is currently pending in the D.C. District Court, seeks to release all files the administration has relating to the investigation and prosecution of Jeffrey Epstein, without redactions, or to provide explanations for all the redactions made.

== Background ==
In November 2025, the Epstein Files Transparency Act was overwhelmingly passed by the United States Congress, and, despite months spent trying to prevent the bill's passage, President Donald Trump signed it into law the following day. The law required the release of all Department of Justice files pertaining to the investigation and prosecution of the child sex offender Jeffrey Epstein (the "Epstein files") within 30 days. The law permitted exceptions to redact and withhold only the portions of records that either reveal personal information of victims, contain child sexual abuse material or would harm an ongoing investigation or national security.

The day of the deadline, Deputy Attorney General Todd Blanche announced that the administration would be releasing several hundred thousand documents, but not all the files in their possession. The partial release received widespread criticism from lawmakers from both parties for substantial redactions, and several instances of releasing identifying information of victims.

By March 2026, the DOJ had concluded its final release of Epstein related documents, with the final batch including FBI interviews with a woman who claimed she was assaulted by President Trump as a minor. The Justice Department announced it had released 3.5 million pages in total, stating that it was then in full compliance with the Transparency Act. However, Representative Ro Khanna disputed this, noting that the department had identified over 6 million pages related to Epstein, raising "questions as to why the rest are being withheld."

The DOJ also made unredacted versions of the released files available to members of Congress on computers at the DOJ offices. Some lawmakers who viewed the unredacted files accused the DOJ of improperly redacting names of Epstein's associates.

== Lawsuit ==
In April 2026, investigative journalist and legal analyst Katie Phang filed a lawsuit against Todd Blanche, who had become Acting Attorney General after the dismissal of Pam Bondi. The lawsuit accused Blanche of failing to comply with the law by missing legal deadlines for disclosure of the files, making improper redactions, failing to explain redactions, and withholding key documents. The filing specifically references withheld, retracted, or redacted documents referring to President Trump.

The lawsuit asked the court to declare Blanche in violation of the new law, order the release of all required documents without unlawful redactions, and provide an explanation for any remaining redactions. Phang also requested that the court appoint an independent special master to oversee compliance. The case was assigned to Judge Emmet G. Sullivan of the D.C. District Court.

=== Preliminary injunction ===
The following month, Phang asked the court to issue a preliminary injunction ordering the release of redacted names or other information related to emails Epstein exchanged regarding a "torture video" and sexual activity with minors, as well as the names of co-defendants in a draft indictment, and the identities of potential co-conspirators. The injunction also sought notes of FBI interviews with a woman who has alleged that at age 13, Epstein introduced her to Trump, who in turn sexually assaulted her. If those documents could not be released for reasons detailed in the Epstein Act, the injunction asked for Blanche to provide a more detailed explanation for their withholding.

On June 25, Judge Sullivan granted the injunction, giving the Department of Justice until July 1 to either turn over the documents without redactions or to explain why the redactions should not be removed. In his opinion, the judge wrote that by not responding to Phang's arguments, "The Attorney General has conceded that he is in violation of the Act."

Hours before the July 1 deadline passed, Associate Attorney General Stanley Woodward asked the court for a two month delay or to dissolve the order entirely. Woodward wrote that the redactions in question were made to protect victims and people’s privacy. Woodward also claimed the FBI notes in the injunction request were duplicative and that their handwritten nature makes redaction difficult. In response, Judge Sullivan gave the DOJ five days to produce the documents in question, so the claims could be verified with an in camera review.

After reviewing documents provided by the DOJ, Judge Sullivan ordered an August 13 public hearing where he continued asking for justifications for redacted names, and production of handwritten FBI interview notes. Saying "The public has a right to know what the hell is going on in this case", the judge brought up the possibility of contempt proceedings. "I just don’t want anyone to be blindsided if we have to go down that road," Sullivan said. "It’s not a threat. It’s a promise."
