= Esa Matius Davis =

American physician

- Education: Johns Hopkins Bloomberg School of Public Health; University of North Carolina at Chapel Hill; University of Medicine and Dentistry of New Jersey; Overlook Medical Center
- Scientific career
- Workplaces: University of Maryland, College Park; Robert Wood Johnson University Hospital

Esa Matius Davis is an American physician who is a professor and Associate Vice President for Community Health at the University of Maryland, College Park. She specializes in maternal health inequities and the perinatal determinants of obesity. She was elected to the National Academy of Medicine in 2025.

== Early life and education ==
Davis studied biology at University of North Carolina at Chapel Hill. She moved to the University of Medicine and Dentistry of New Jersey, where she completed her medical degree, with a residency at Overlook Medical Center. She was a postdoctoral scholar at Robert Wood Johnson University Hospital. She eventually completed a master's of public health at Johns Hopkins Bloomberg School of Public Health.

== Research and career ==
Davis moved to the University of Maryland School of Medicine in 2023. Davis investigates the perinatal determinants of obesity and develops new strategies to improve women's health. She developed screening strategies to identify gestational diabetes, and has developed epidemiological approaches to understand maternal health disparities. She has demonstrated that one-step glucose tolerance screenings are not as effective to two-step screenings. At the University of Pittsburgh, Davis worked on the Tobacco Treatment Program.

Davis works to reduce health inequities. She investigated the diabetes risk of people living in urban and rural environments, and found people living in rural settings had a 10% greater risk of heart attack.

In 2021, Davis was appointed to the United States Preventive Services Task Force in recognition of her expertise in clinical prevention and health promotion. She was made Vice Chair in March 2025. On the Task Force she expanded guidelines to ensure pregnant women were screened for hypertensive disorders. Black women are much more likely to die from hypertension during and after pregnancy (pre-eclampsia and eclampsia) than white women.

Davis was elected as one of 25 Black Marylanders to watch by The Baltimore Sun in 2024. In 2025, she was elected to the National Academy of Medicine.

== Selected publications ==
- Tiffani J Johnson; Matthew D Weaver; Sonya Borrero; Esa M Davis; Larissa Myaskovsky; Noel S Zuckerbraun; Kevin L Kraemer (23 September 2013). "Association of race and ethnicity with management of abdominal pain in the emergency department". Pediatrics. 132 (4): e851-8. doi:10.1542/peds.2012-3127. ISSN 0031-4005. PMC 4074647. PMID 24062370. Wikidata Q33819681.
- Irene E. Headen; Esa M. Davis; Mahasin S Mujahid; Barbara Abrams (5 January 2012). "Racial-ethnic differences in pregnancy-related weight" (PDF). Advances in Nutrition. 3 (1): 83–94. doi:10.3945/an.111.000984. ISSN 2161-8313. PMC 3262620. PMID 22332106. Wikidata Q35684634.
- Esa M Davis; Stephen J Zyzanski; Christine M Olson; Kurt C Stange; Ralph I Horwitz (4 December 2008). "Racial, ethnic, and socioeconomic differences in the incidence of obesity related to childbirth". American Journal of Public Health. 99 (2): 294–299. doi:10.2105/ajph.2007.132373. ISSN 1541-0048. PMC 2622775. PMID 19059856. Wikidata Q82854051.
