= Katie Phang =

American attorney and television host (born 1975)

- Born: August 1, 1975 (age 51); Miami, Florida, United States
- Education: Yale University (BA); University of Miami (JD)
- Occupations: Lawyer; political commentator; podcaster; television host
- Employer: MeidasTouch
- Known for: The Katie Phang Show on MSNBC, Katie Phang News Channel YouTube
- Spouse: Jonathan Feldman
- Children: 1

Kathleen Suzanne Phang (born August 1, 1975) is an American lawyer, political commentator, podcaster, and former television host. She previously hosted The Katie Phang Show on MSNBC until 2025.

== Early life ==
Phang was born in Miami, Florida. Her father emigrated to the United States from South Korea at the age of 19. Phang graduated from Miami Palmetto Senior High School in Pinecrest, Florida. She earned a Bachelor of Arts in political science from Yale University and a Juris Doctor from the University of Miami School of Law, graduating in 2000. She then worked for the state attorney's office in Miami-Dade County.

== Career ==
In 2005, Phang joined WFOR-TV as a legal consultant to discuss the trial of Michael Jackson. The chief assistant to the state attorney, Katherine Fernandez Rundle, informed her that she needed to quit the role, because Rundle "does not want her assistants providing public legal analysis or commentary regarding criminal trials". Phang instead quit her job with the state attorney's office, keeping the unpaid legal consultant role and joining a private law firm. She also covered the trial of Robert Blake and the Terri Schiavo case for WFOR. She became a legal analyst for Fox News, and was a frequent guest of Greta Van Susteren.

Phang became a legal analyst for the NBCUniversal News Group in 2017. In 2021, Phang appeared with Kevin O'Leary and Ada Pozo on CNBC's Money Court, where they adjudicated financial disputes. In April 2022, she premiered a new Saturday show—The Katie Phang Show—on MSNBC and Peacock; the show was produced from Telemundo's Miami studios. Later in 2022, Phang hosted 'Class Action', a 12-part documentary podcast that followed competitive mock trial teams. Phang was also a fill-in host on MSNBC's All In with Chris Hayes, The Beat with Ari Melber and The Last Word with Lawrence O'Donnell.

In February 2025, Phang's show was canceled, effective in late April, because of MSNBC's plans to consolidate their production in New York and Washington D.C. as part of their spinoff from NBCUniversal. Phang was to remain with the network as a legal correspondent, but later announced during her show's final airing that she would only appear as a guest.

In May 2025, Phang started a YouTube channel in partnership with the MeidasTouch Network. In an October 2025 discussion with attorney Michael Popok on his Legal AF podcast at that channel, Phang expressed her certainty that she was fired from MSNBC because of her politics and what she called her "tone." (Note: Her full comments: "... [O]bviously my departure from MSNBC, mainstream media, traditional legacy media... clearly, it wasn't linked to the Charlie Kirk stuff, because I left MS as of May 1st. But it was linked to this idea of having corporate oligarchs and corporate overlords that were overly concerned about your tone and about your content. And it really was a direct result of, after Trump taking office, the FCC Chair, Brendan Carr, as y'all will remember, he was sending threatening letters to NBC, ABC, CBS, the parent companies, Comcast, Paramount, et cetera, Disney, um, saying, 'Look, I need to know all of the details about your DEI policies. I need to know everything about your woke policies and programs.' I mean, he made it very clear that he was going to do stuff like he just did in that CBS-Paramount settlement where, not only was it, you know, the $15-16 million dollars, but if you'll recall, for that merger between Skydance and Paramount, now there's a 'ombudsman,' a monitor, that looks at the programming to make sure that it's, quote, fair, and we all know what that means, right? ... So, for me to be able to be in independent media, like we are here ... we have to be able to speak unabashedly and frame things in the truth. And part of that is saying the hard things out loud. Talking about these executive orders, and saying that it is in the pursuit of cleansing this country of minorities. I could not have gotten away with saying that if I was on mainstream media, Mike. I would have gotten in a lot of trouble. I was already getting into trouble with some of the things I was saying about convicted felon Donald Trump." Popok said, "I'll say it, since you're not going to: Everybody that got canned from MSNBC was a person of color... Why is it only the Asian and Black people that end up being shown the door?" Phang said, "I think it's more about tone, about attitude, about forcefulness, urgency, exigency of messaging...and again that was the coincidence of who we were, our backgrounds, our races, et cetera.")

On April 27, 2026, Phang filed a lawsuit in the United States District Court for the District of Columbia against Todd Blanche, accusing him of violating the Epstein Files Transparency Act by not releasing the entirety of the Epstein files. In June, Judge Emmet Sullivan ruled that the Trump administration likely violated the law and to unredact more documents from the Epstein files or explain why they should not be unredacted by July 2.

== Personal life ==
Phang and her husband, Jonathan Feldman, live in Miami Shores, Florida. They have a daughter.
